= Deception Pass (disambiguation) =

Deception Pass is a strait in Washington, United States.

Deception Pass may also refer to:

- Deception Pass (Alberta), a mountain pass in Canada
- Deception Pass (King County, Washington), a mountain pass in the United States
- Deception Pass Bridge, two bridges in Washington, United States
- Deception Pass State Park, a state park in Washington, United States
- Deception Pass ferry, a former ferry route in Washington, United States
