= Deception Pass State Park =

State park in Washington, U.S.

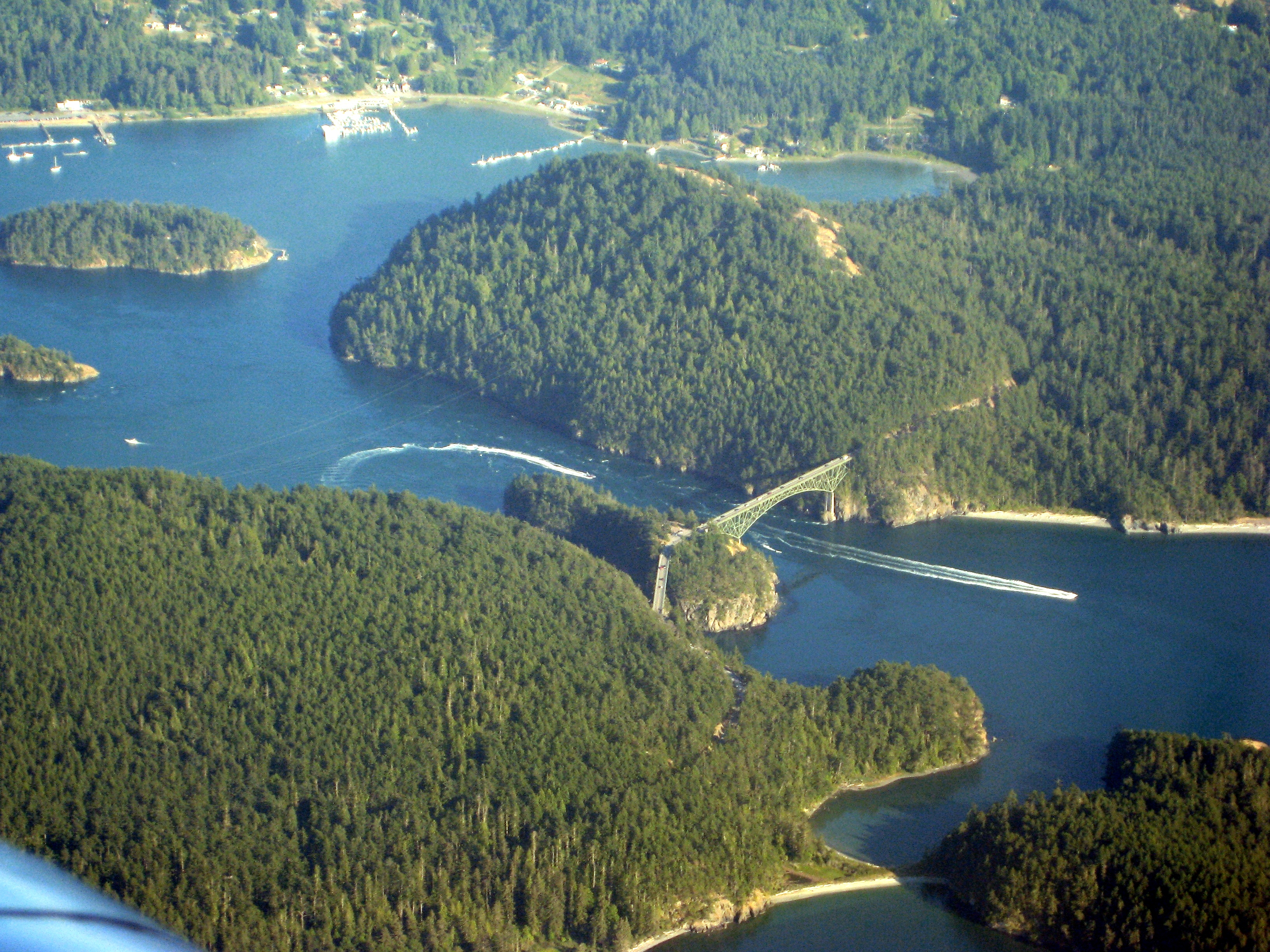
- Aerial view of Deception Pass looking southeast

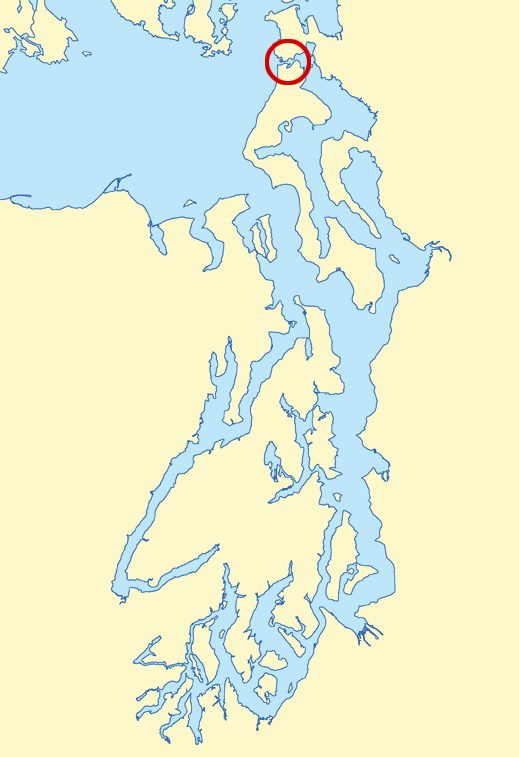
- Located in the northern Puget Sound region, Deception Pass (circled in red) connects the Strait of Juan de Fuca (to the west) to Skagit Bay (to the east). Fidalgo Island is to the north and Whidbey Island is to the south.
- Type: State park
- Location: Anacortes and Oak Harbor, Washington, United States
- Coordinates: 48°24′27″N 122°38′42″W
- Area: 3,854 acres (1,560 ha)
- Created: April 17, 1922
- Operator: Washington State Parks
- Visitors: 3,000,000+ annually
- Open: Year-round
- Website: Official website

Deception Pass State Park is a 3,854-acre (1,560 ha) state park in Washington state. It is located on nine islands—principally Whidbey and Fidalgo islands—on either side of Deception Pass, the waterway connecting the Strait of Juan de Fuca with Skagit Bay. It includes numerous bays, inlets and other waterways that provide home for a variety of marine life and coastal Pacific Northwest flora, and the park's undersea natural resources are protected as part of the National System of Marine Protected Areas. The park's two sections, like its two main islands, are connected by the two spans of the Deception Pass Bridge, completed in 1934.

The park originally covered 1,800 acres (730 ha) of land that formed a military reserve prior to its sale to the state in 1922. The park was first developed in the 1930s by crews of the Civilian Conservation Corps, who constructed a number of buildings, installations and landscape features in the National Park Service rustic style. Many of these facilities are recognized on the National Register of Historic Places. Since its establishment, with its proximity to the Greater Seattle and Greater Vancouver areas, the park has consistently ranked as the most-visited park in the Washington State Parks system. With more than 3 million visitors annually, it rivals some of the most popular U.S. national parks in visitors.

== Geography ==
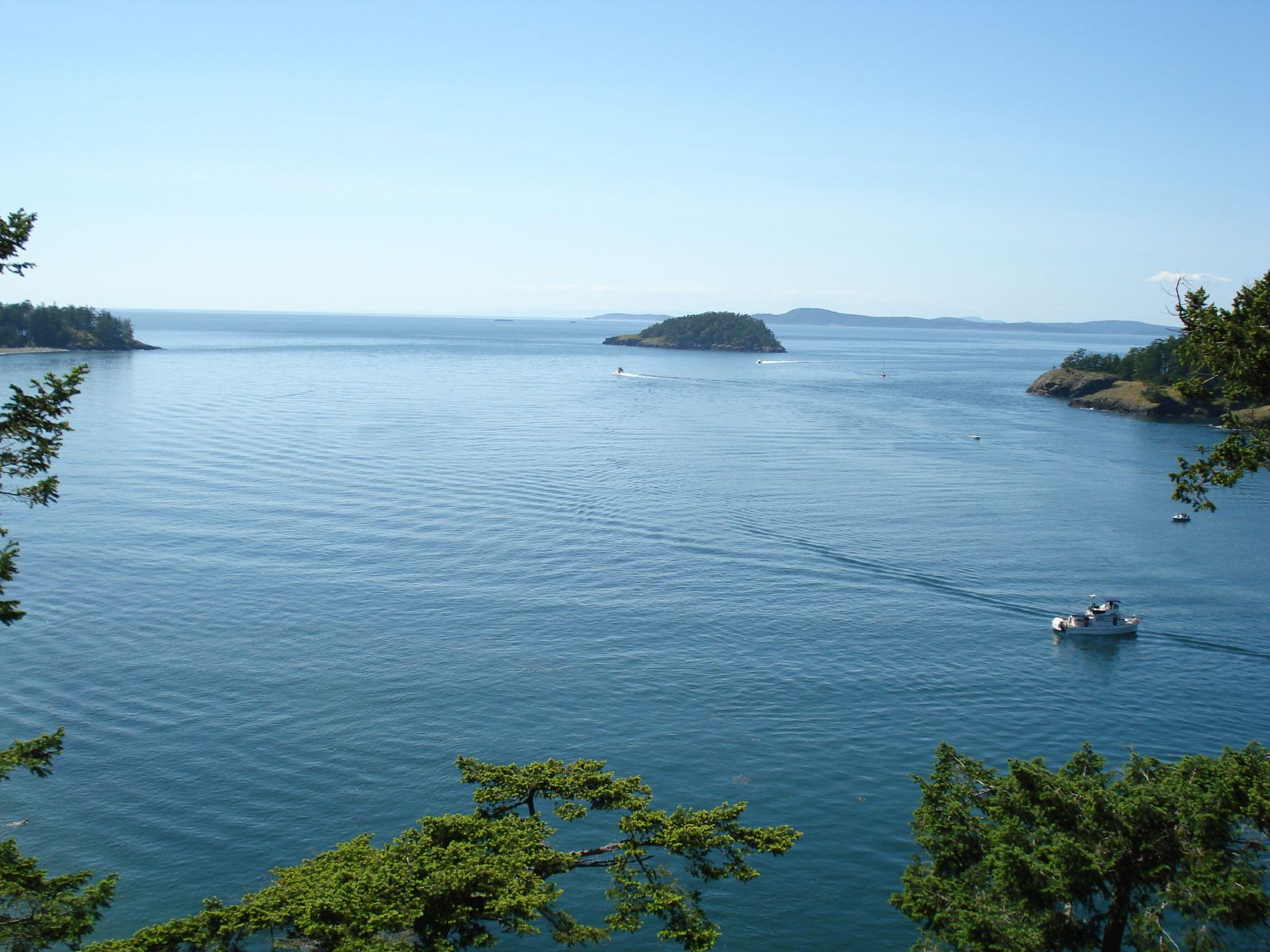
A view west to the Strait of Juan de Fuca and Deception Island from Deception Pass Bridge

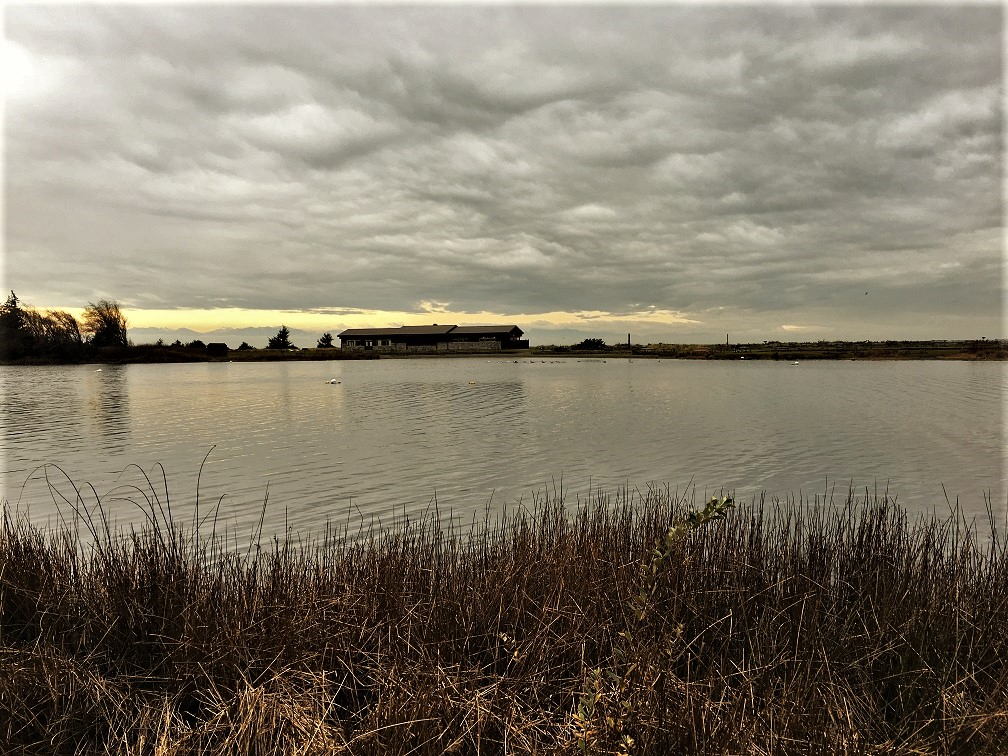
Cranberry Lake

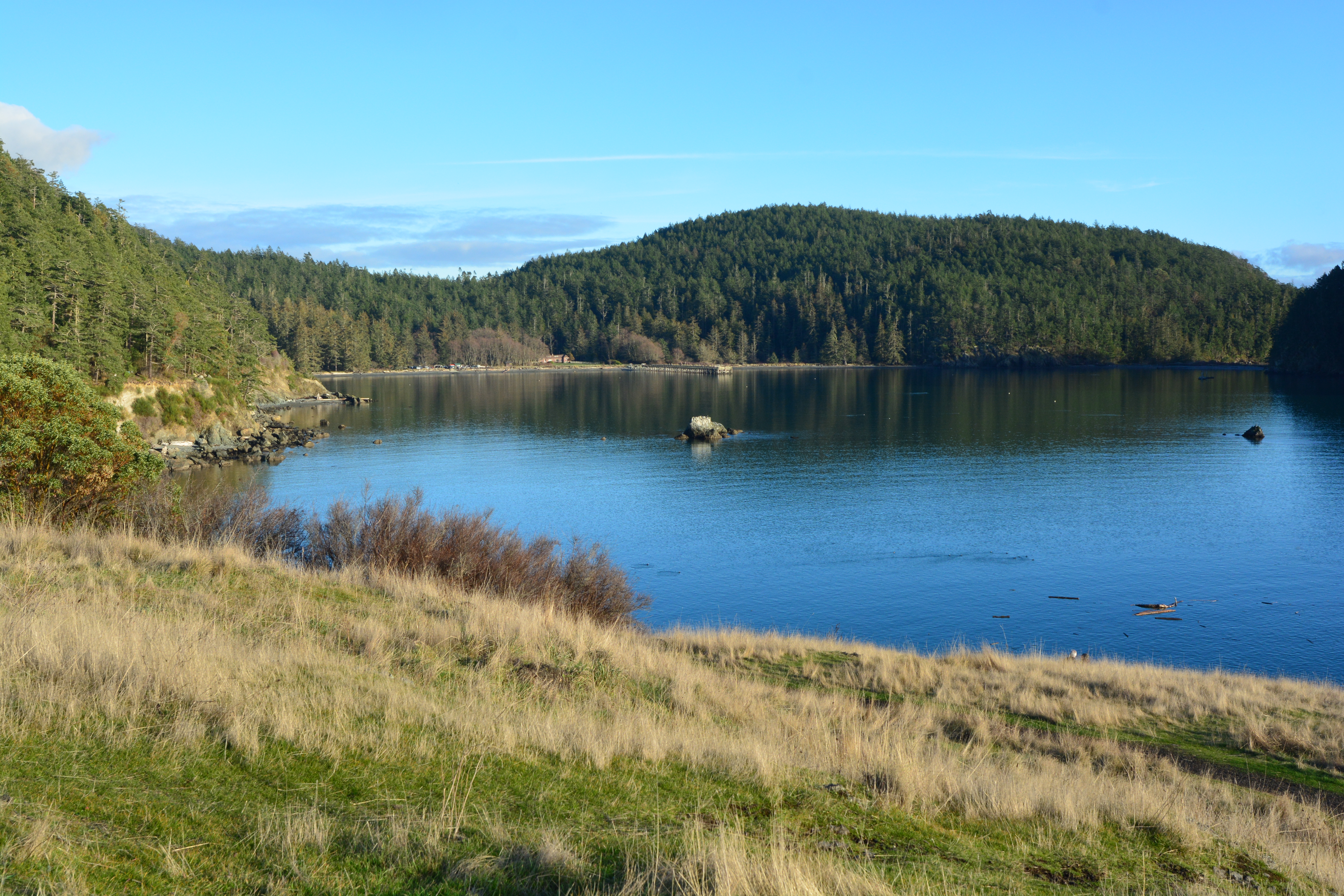
Bowman Bay

The park encompasses 3,824 acres (1,548 ha) on nine islands. In addition to the sections on Whidbey and Fidalgo, Northwest Island, Deception Island, Pass Island, Strawberry Island are included in the park. Eight acres of 10-acre (4.0 ha) Ben Ure Island are also part of the park, with the remaining portion being privately owned. The park management also administers state parkland on Hope Island and Skagit Island in Skagit Bay and a portion of Kiket Island, which it manages jointly with the Swinomish Indian Tribal Community.

Four freshwater lakes are included in the park boundaries: Cranberry Lake on Whidbey and Pass, Campbell and Heart lakes on Fidalgo. Heart Lake is located in a discontiguous 310 acres (130 ha) section of the park in Anacortes that includes old-growth forest in a state-designated natural forest area.

The park's 15 miles (24 km) of shoreline include rocky beaches, sand spits, bluffs and headlands characteristic of the Puget Sound coastline. The park's diverse landscape also includes wetlands around Cranberry Lake. Lush forested shorelines extend between beaches and rocky outcroppings. The hill north of Bowman Bay, points on the west side of Whidbey and on the south side of islands feature drier upland forests. West Beach also includes the only sand dunes of significance on Puget Sound. Within the park boundaries lies Goose Hill, which at 484 feet (148 m) is the highest point on Whidbey Island. The park is in close proximity to the major urban areas of Seattle and Vancouver.

== History ==
Prior to World War I, the U.S. military used much of the land surrounding Deception Pass as part of the coastal defenses of Puget Sound. Some land was used for recreational purposes; Rosario Beach was a destination for steamship day trips from Seattle, and Ben Ure ran a saloon and smuggling den on his namesake island during Prohibition. From 1909 to 1914, the state ran a quarry with convict labor on Fidalgo Island just east of the pass.

With the advent of aerial warfare, fewer coastal defenses were needed, and the military sold land around the pass to Washington state in 1922. The park was established on April 17, 1922, making it one of Washington's oldest state parks. At the time, there was no bridge across the pass; road traffic was handled by a small ferry whose operator—the first female ship captain in the state—strenuously opposed the construction of a bridge. The park's initial 1,800 acres (730 ha) were dedicated in a ceremony on Whidbey Island on July 20, 1922.

While the park welcomed more than 20,000 visitors in 1924, development of the park did not begin until the Great Depression. In the 1930s, Civilian Conservation Corps (CCC) crews were set to work on recreational facilities, buildings and roads, including the approaches to the planned Deception Pass Bridge. CCC members initially worked on the park installations on Fidalgo Island; once the bridge was completed in 1934, they finished structures and development on the Whidbey Island side. During this time, the National Park Service briefly considered bringing the park into its system.

By 1964, the park spanned 1,764 acres (714 ha). It expanded with the addition of Hoypus Hill on Whidbey Island east of Cornet Bay in 1991. The 569-acre (230 ha) tract was transferred from the state Department of Natural Resources and included old-growth forest.

In 1983, the park erected a two-sided wooden "story pole" at Rosario Beach that recounts the Samish legend of Ko-kwal-alwoot, the so-called "Maiden of Deception Pass". The statue was erected on the site of Coast Salish longhouses and potlatches.

In the early 1990s, the park notched more than five million visitors each year. By the 2020s, the park received more than three million visitors each year, counting 3.8 million in 2021 (more than the 3.29 million who visited Yosemite National Park that year) and 3.4 million in 2023. Washington residents account for three-fourths of the visitors, but the remainder come from the rest of the United States and foreign locations. Prior to the COVID-19 pandemic, up to 40% of campers at the park were from Canada.

== Recreation ==
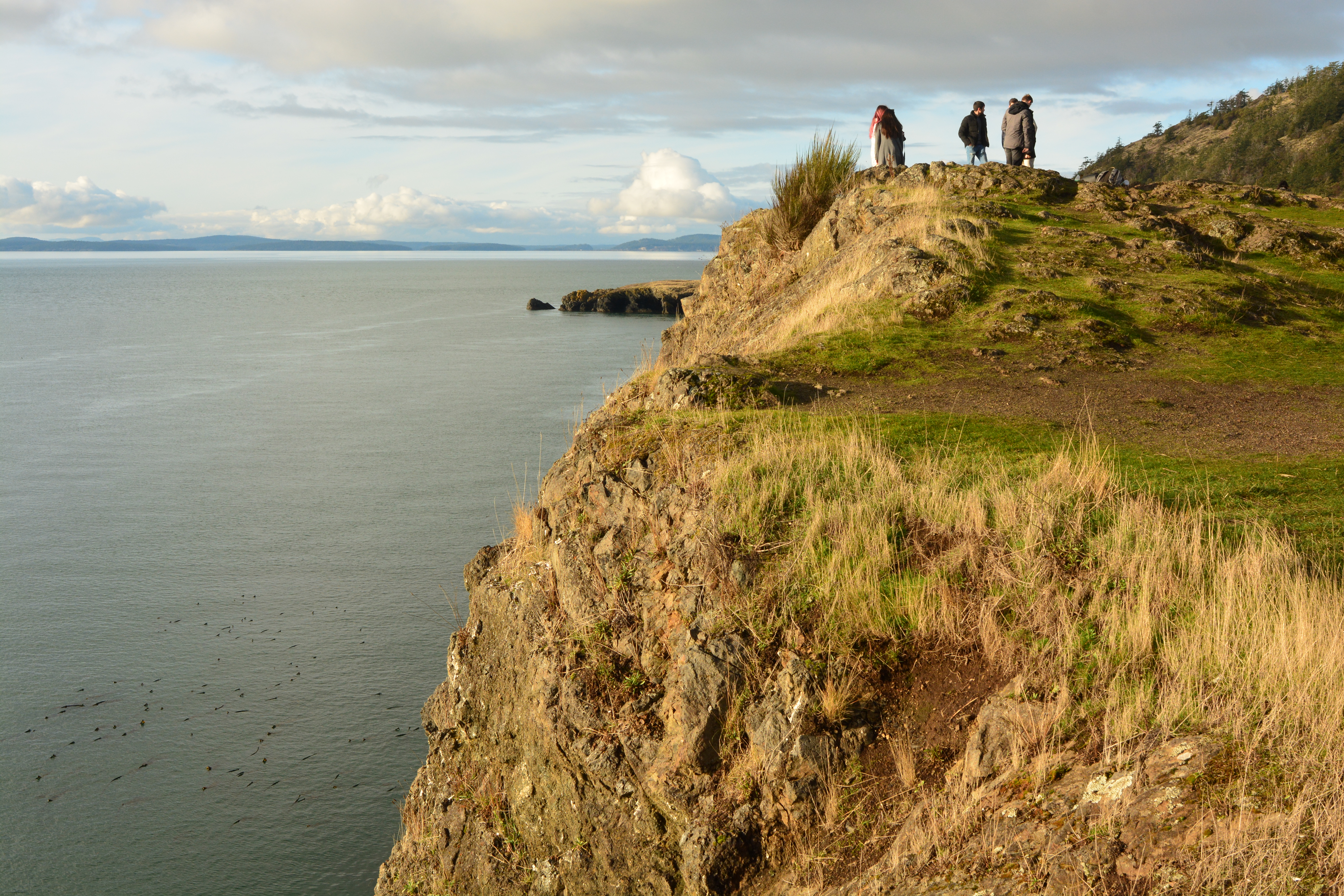
Hikers on Rosario Head

The park includes 40 miles (64 km) of trails. Trails cover a wide range of landscapes, including mountains, cliffs, beaches, wetlands and forests. Biking and horseback riding are available. Camping at 317 campsites is offered at Cranberry Lake, Cornet Bay and Bowman Bay. A retreat center at Cornet Bay accommodates 190.

Paddling is available in freshwater lakes and in protected bays, while the turbulent waters of Deception Pass provide the most challenging saltwater paddling in Washington state. Cranberry Lake offers swimming and boat rentals. Pass Lake provides fishing, while Campbell Lake provides access to motorized watercraft.

As of 2022, the park had 14 full-time staff, a number that doubled during the summer peak. Paid staff are complemented by numerous volunteers through the Deception Pass Park Foundation to protect tide pools, provide interpretive programs for visitors, clean campgrounds and assist with maintenance. After state budget cuts, the foundation fundraised to underwrite a full-time interpretive specialist position.

The park holds weekly summer American roots music concerts at its amphitheater and hosts artists in residence in a cabin on Ben Ure Island.

== Flora and fauna ==
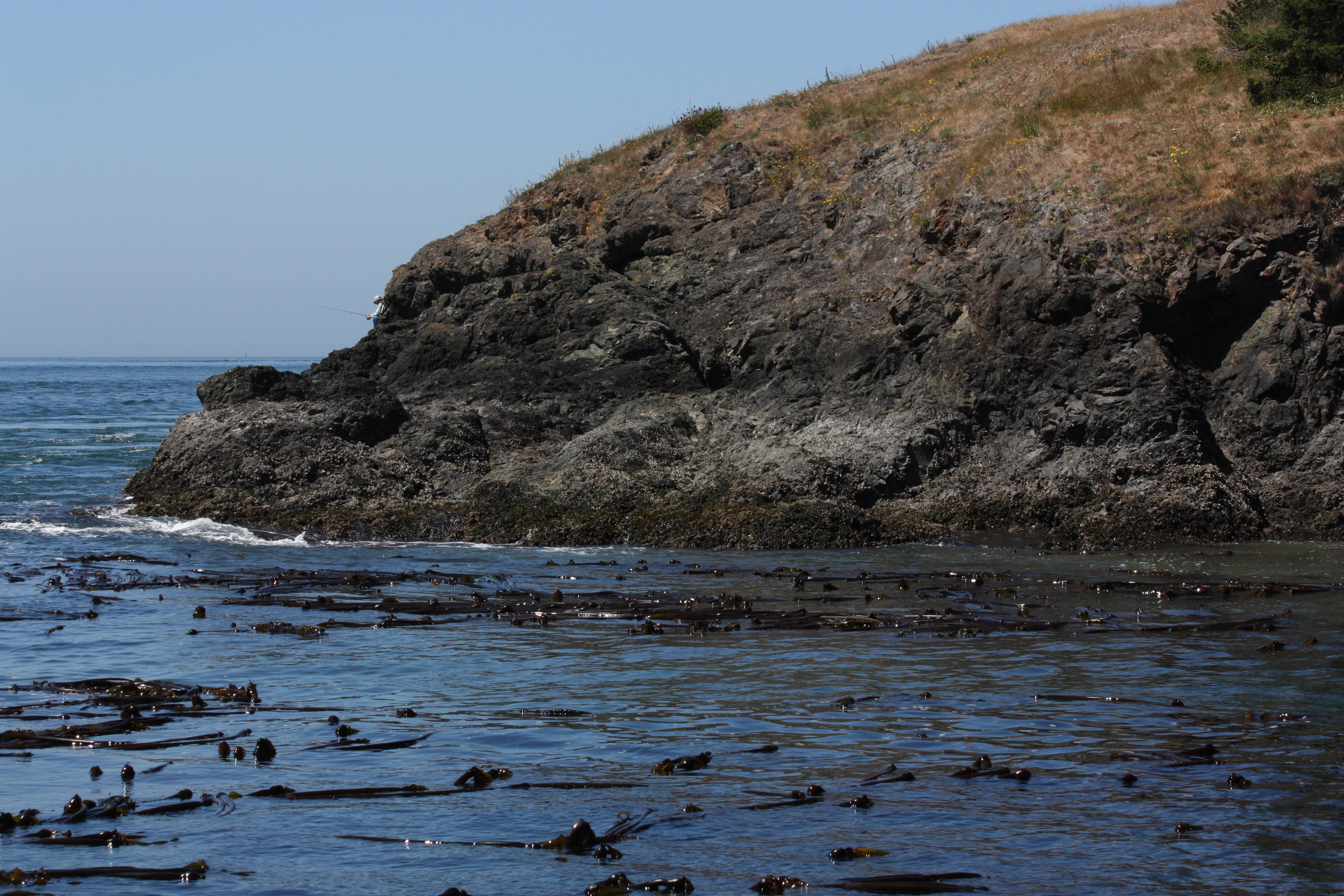
Bull kelp on the beach by Reservation Head

Flora in the park includes several old-growth stands of coastal Washington's prominent trees: Douglas firs, Western redcedar and Western hemlock. The oldest trees are older than 450 years old, with another batch more than 250 years old. One gnarled tree is estimated to be over 900 years old. Skagit Island was as of 1998 the location of the largest Rocky Mountain juniper in Washington, standing 60 feet (18 m) tall and 4.5 feet (1.4 m) wide.

In addition to Douglas fir, cedar and hemlock, trees found in shoreline forests at Deception Pass State Park include alder, big-leaf maple, grand fir and spruce. With rockier, drier soil, the hilltop areas feature grassy and brushy areas with abundant wildflowers in spring. Trees in the upland areas include madrone and smaller Douglas fir specimens, while shrubs include snowberry, salal, Oregon grape, thimbleberry and Nootka rose. The wetlands are home to Nootka rose, salmonberry, red elderberry, Pacific willow, sword fern and skunk cabbage. Large kelp beds grow off of Rosario Head.

Fauna in the park include whales, bald eagles, loons and alligator lizards. Elephant seals frequent Bowman Bay, and Rosario Beach's tide pools provide habitats for sea cucumbers, crabs, snails and chitons.

== Conservation ==
In the 1970s, several of the CCC-built structures were painted dark green and brown to make them uniform with other park facilities in the state. Decades later, volunteers stripped the paint to restore the buildings to their original rustic appearance. The park was nominated for the National Register of Historic Places in 2012 (the Deception Pass Bridge having been listed in 1982). In 2019, several sections and facilities in the park were listed on the National Register of Historic Places. Several former CCC corps members helped the park create an interpretive center for the CCC heritage at Bowman Bay in 1988.

Since 2009, undersea resources have been protected as Deception Pass Underwater Park as part of the National Oceanic and Atmospheric Administration's National System of Marine Protected Areas. Wildlife in Rosario Beach's tide pools, which are underwater at different times of day, have suffered from visitors walking through the area at low tide. To preserve and restore the tide pool habitat, park personnel have created designated walkways using ropes.

In 2012 and 2015, respectively, the park removed creosote-coated wood and sea walls—originally built for long-defunct fish hatcheries—from Cornet Bay and Bowman Bay. Riprap was also removed from Bowman Bay beach. These artificial features had been hindering intertidal sea life.

== Historic sites ==
National Register of Historic Places historic districts or individually listed properties were listed in 2019 as part of the Historic Park Landscapes in National and State Parks Multiple Property Submission.

=== Cornet Bay Fire Circle ===
- Cornet Bay Fire Circle
- U.S. National Register of Historic Places
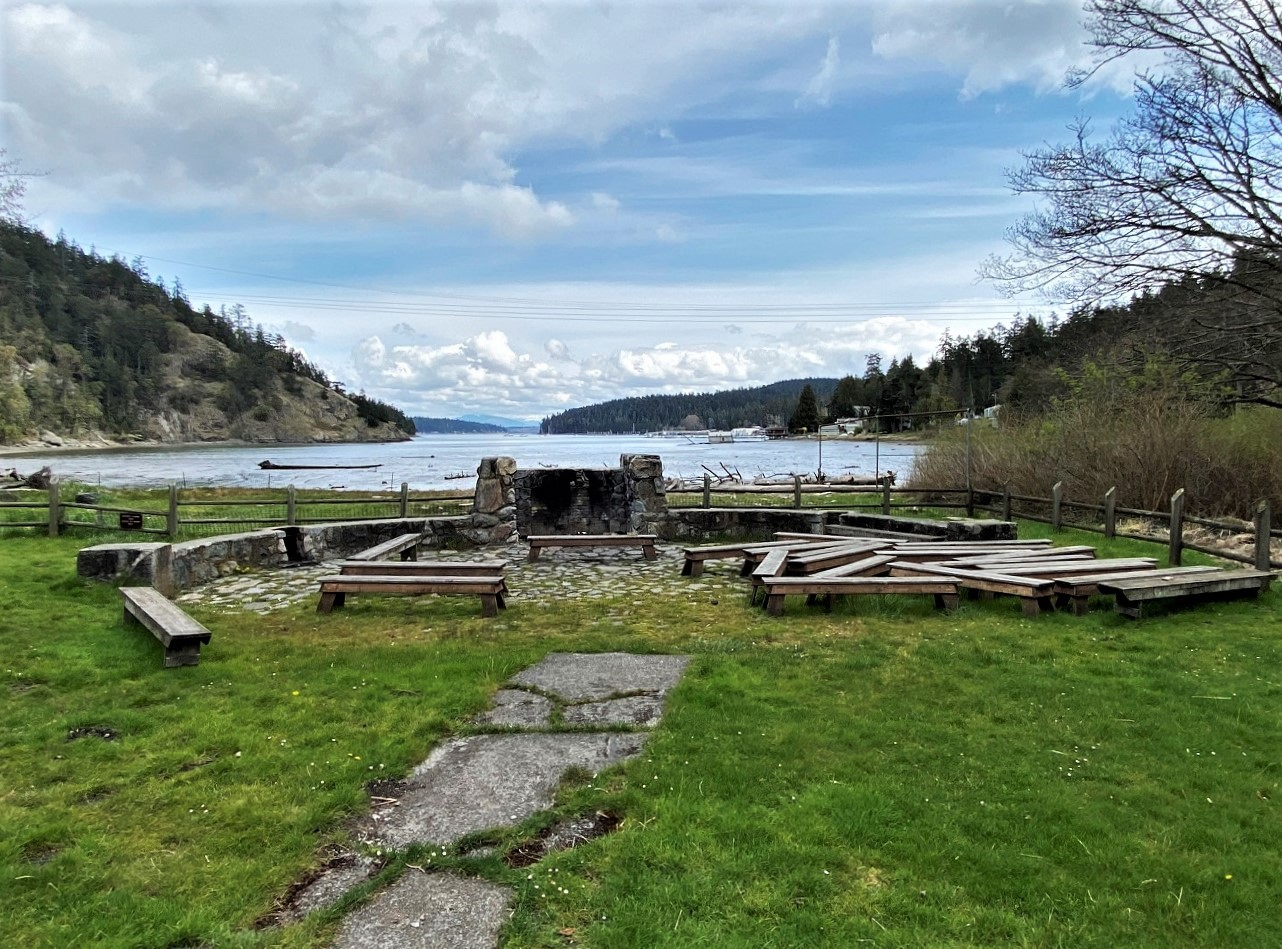
- Cornet Bay Fire Circle
- Location: Cornet Bay Road, Cornet, Washington
- Built: 1934–1935
- MPS: Historic Park Landscapes in National and State Parks MPS
- NRHP reference No.: 100004769
- Added to NRHP: December 6, 2019

The Cornet Bay Fire Circle was built on Whidbey Island at CCC Camp SP-3 in 1934–1935. It is a semi-circular enclosure with 2-foot (0.61 m)-tall, 18-inch-thick (46 cm) walls extending out from a 5-foot-high (1.5 m), 8-foot-wide (2.4 m) stone and brick reflector. Altogether the fire circle spans 14 feet (4.3 m) feet and is paved with flagstones.

The fire circle is one of only a few installations in the park that were built expressly for the CCC worker camps. The camp area was converted and redeveloped for group camping and environmental learning in the 1950s and 1960s. The fire circle remained a focal point of the camping area. While the NRHP nomination form noted that the redevelopment has compromised the fire circle's setting, it said the circle retained sufficient integrity to be included in the multiple property listing for Deception Pass State Park sites.

=== Cornet Bay Incinerator ===
- Cornet Bay Incinerator
- U.S. National Register of Historic Places
- Location: Cornet Bay Road, Cornet, Washington
- Built: 1936
- MPS: Historic Park Landscapes in National and State Parks MPS
- NRHP reference No.: 100004771
- Added to NRHP: December 6, 2019

Located at the northeast end of the clearing where Camp SP-3 was sited, the incinerator was one of two built in the park for disposal of garbage. It was built of granite with a fire brick lining and cast iron doors and stands 5.5 feet (1.7 m) tall, 7 feet (2.1 m) deep and 8 feet (2.4 m) wide, a design typical of CCC-constructed incinerators in Washington. The incinerator has been minimally altered. It is surrounded by a log fence for the protection of youth at the nearby campground.

=== Cranberry Lake Bathing and Picnic Area ===
- Cranberry Lake Bathing and Picnic Area Historic District
- U.S. National Register of Historic Places
- U.S. Historic district
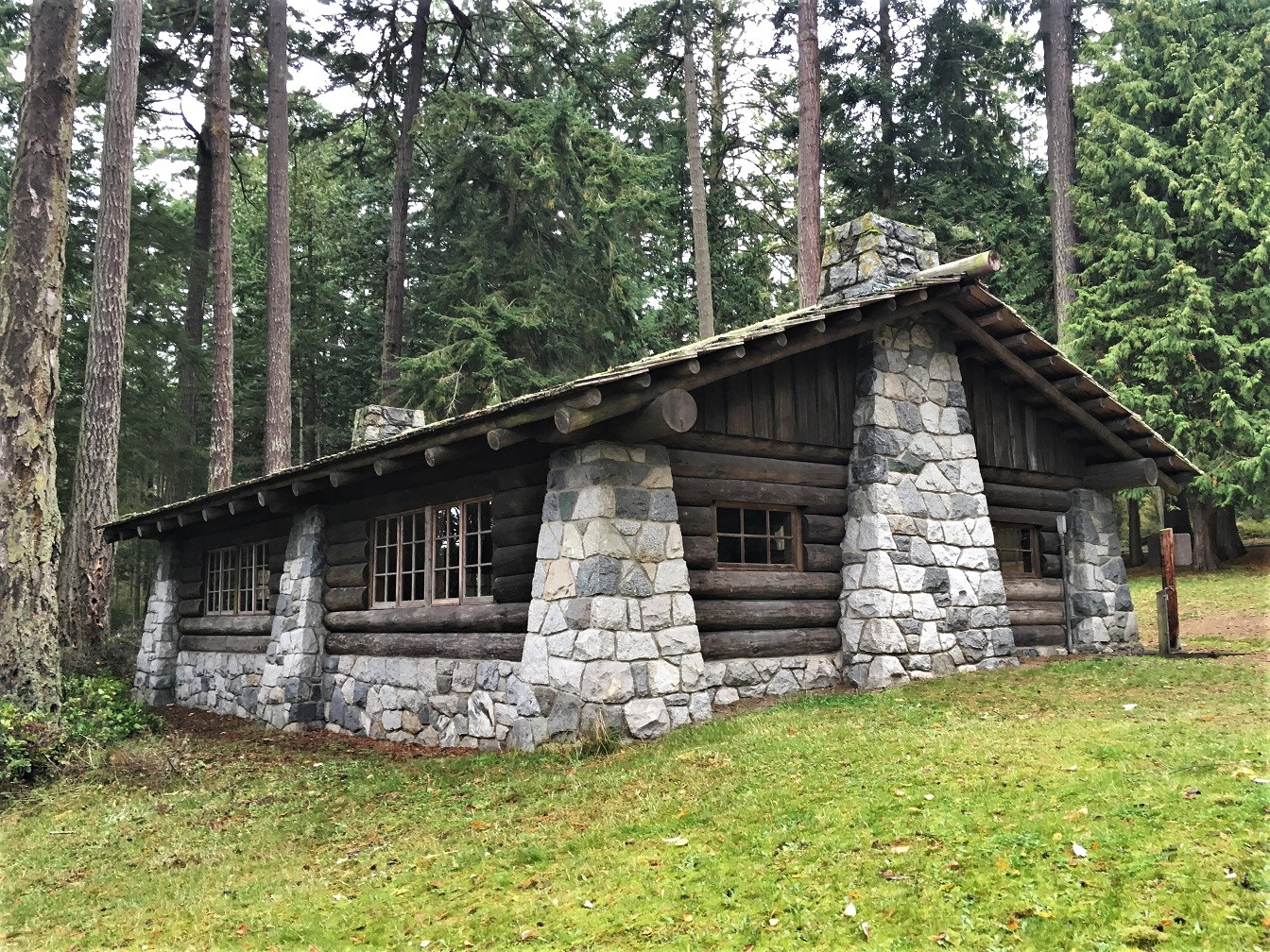
- Combination building at Cranberry Lake
- Location: State Highway 20, Oak Harbor, Washington
- Built: 1933–1938
- Architectural style: National Park Service rustic
- MPS: Historic Park Landscapes in National and State Parks MPS
- NRHP reference No.: 100004772
- Added to NRHP: December 4, 2019

Cranberry Lake is located at the northwest end of Whidbey Island and was the historically the primary point of access to fresh water in the park. The historic district, located at the east end of the lake, contains six CCC-constructed buildings: three kitchens, two comfort stations and a pump house. CCC workers from Company 266, based at Camp SP-3, graded and cleared the area to create an open grassy zone in front of the lake with mature evergreens studding the landscape. One CCC-era building (a bath house) has been removed, and the dock has been replaced, but the rest of the area retains its CCC-era character. Of the trees marked in the master plan for the parking area, 90 percent remained as of 2019 when the district was listed on the National Register.

Contributing structures in the district include a combination building used for cooking with a triple stove and a large fireplace; a shelter kitchen overlooking Cranberry Lake; a campstove shelter (one of four similar ones in the park); a pump house; a comfort station since transformed to house a transformer and generator; and a latrine. Sheltered campstoves were considered necessary in the rainy Pacific Northwest. Other contributing features of the historic district are the parking area, which has only been altered by paving and the removal of log guardrails; a stone seawall that defined the swimming area in the lake; a drinking fountain and the general landscaping of the lakefront beach and picnic area. The architect for the structures in this area is unknown.

=== Cranberry Lake Caretaker's Area Historic District ===
- Cranberry Lake Caretaker's Area Historic District
- U.S. National Register of Historic Places
- U.S. Historic district
- Location: State Highway 20, Oak Harbor, Washington
- Built: 1933–1938
- Architect: Ellsworth Storey (house)
- Architectural style: National Park Service rustic
- MPS: Historic Park Landscapes in National and State Parks MPS
- NRHP reference No.: 100004647
- Added to NRHP: November 20, 2019

Located just north of the Cranberry Lake bathing and picnic area historic district, the caretaker's area historic district includes several structures built for the park's administrative purposes. The caretaker's residence was designed by Ellsworth Storey to a template he used in many similar park applications. Saddle-notched log walls are placed on a concrete foundation; the roof has intersecting gables. The house is oriented toward a covered porch on the north. An original roof of shakes has been replaced by cedar shingles. The house includes a large masonry chimney. A plan for an identical house to this one, albeit designed for Lewis and Clark State Park, was featured in Park and Recreation Structures magazine. A caretaker's shop and garage and a maintenance shop designed by an unknown architect are also contributing properties to the district, as is a park entrance sign.

=== North Beach Picnic Area Historic District ===
- North Beach Picnic Area Historic District
- U.S. National Register of Historic Places
- U.S. Historic district
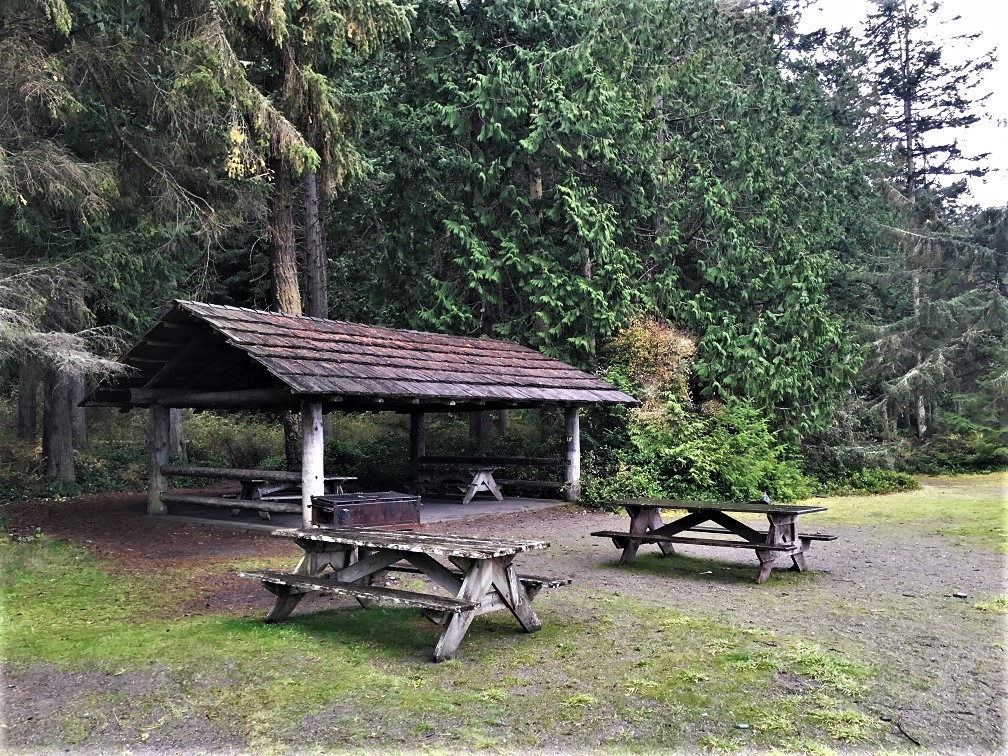
- Shelter at North Beach
- Location: State Highway 20, Oak Harbor, Washington
- Built: 1933–1938
- Architect: Robert "Jack" Patterson, Grant D. Ross
- Architectural style: National Park Service rustic
- MPS: Historic Park Landscapes in National and State Parks MPS
- NRHP reference No.: 100004772
- Added to NRHP: November 22, 2019

North Beach is located on Whidbey Island on the south shore of Deception Pass, west of the bridge. Four buildings and a structure are situated on a flat bench behind a long, rocky beach. Kitchens front the beach, while a latrine is located closer to the parking area. CCC corps workers based at Camp SP-3 at Cornet Bay built the recreational structures at North Beach, which were designed by Robert "Jack" Patterson and Grant D. Ross. It was one of the primary areas of the park developed by the corps.

Prominent within the historic district is a large community kitchen. This building has large side gables with log columns supporting them at the corners. Other contributing properties include a shelter kitchen, campstove shelter, latrine and drinking fountain. The kitchens and campstove shelter were featured in Park and Recreation Structures. The structures were designed in NPS rustic style with use of stone and brick masonry, peeled logs and split cedar shingles. The landscape, geography, climate, design and land use within the historic district are little altered from the era in which they were built.

=== Rosario and Bowman Bathing, Picnic and Caretaker's Areas Historic District ===
- Rosario and Bowman Bathing, Picnic and Caretaker's Areas Historic District
- U.S. National Register of Historic Places
- U.S. Historic district
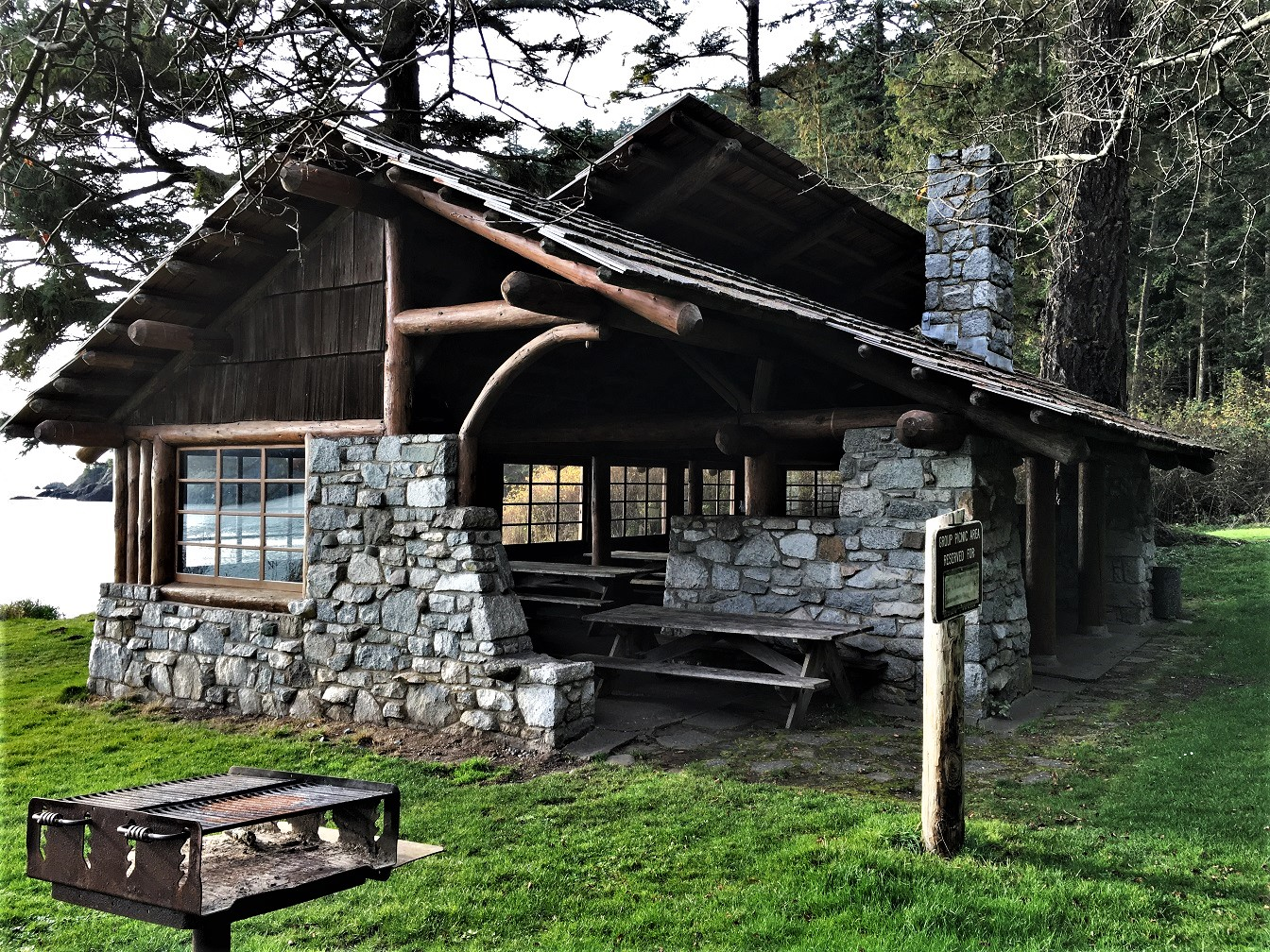
- Cooking shelter at Bowman Bay
- Location: Bowman Bay Road, Dewey, Washington
- Built: 1933–1938
- Architect: Ellsworth Storey, Robert "Jack" Patterson, Roland Koepf
- Architectural style: National Park Service rustic
- MPS: Historic Park Landscapes in National and State Parks MPS
- NRHP reference No.: 100004772
- Added to NRHP: December 4, 2019

This historic district, which encompasses historic elements in the northwest section of the park on Fidalgo Island, includes 17 contributing properties that were erected by CCC corps members between 1933 and 1938. The contributing properties include: a community kitchen, pump house and latrine at Rosario Beach; the entry piers and parking loop at Rosario; a trail between Rosario Beach and Bowman Bay; a bath house, community kitchen, multipurpose building, cooking shelter, drinking fountain, campground and comfort station at Bowman Bay; and several operational structures at Bowman Bay (entry piers, parking loop and park boundary markers; a caretaker's residence, shop and garage; a water storage reservoir; and a barn). The bath house and caretaker's house at Bowman Bay were identical to those at Cranberry Lake.

The structures in the district were designed in the NPS rustic style by Ellsworth Storey, Robert "Jack" Patterson and Roland Koepf. The structures in this district were built by CCC Company 948, based at Camp SP-4 near Rosario Beach. The company used locally sourced materials for construction, including stone quarried on site, peeled logs and split cedar shingles. In addition to developing the areas around Rosario Beach and Bowman Bay, the company assisted with clearing and grading the northern approaches for the spans of Deception Pass Bridge.

== In popular culture ==
Several movies and commercials have been filmed in the park, including The Ring and Captain Fantastic. The park is also the setting for Earl Emerson's 1997 mystery novel Deception Pass.
