= Snee Oosh, Washington =

Unincorporated community in Washington, United States

Snee Oosh, Washington sdiʔus
- Unincorporated community
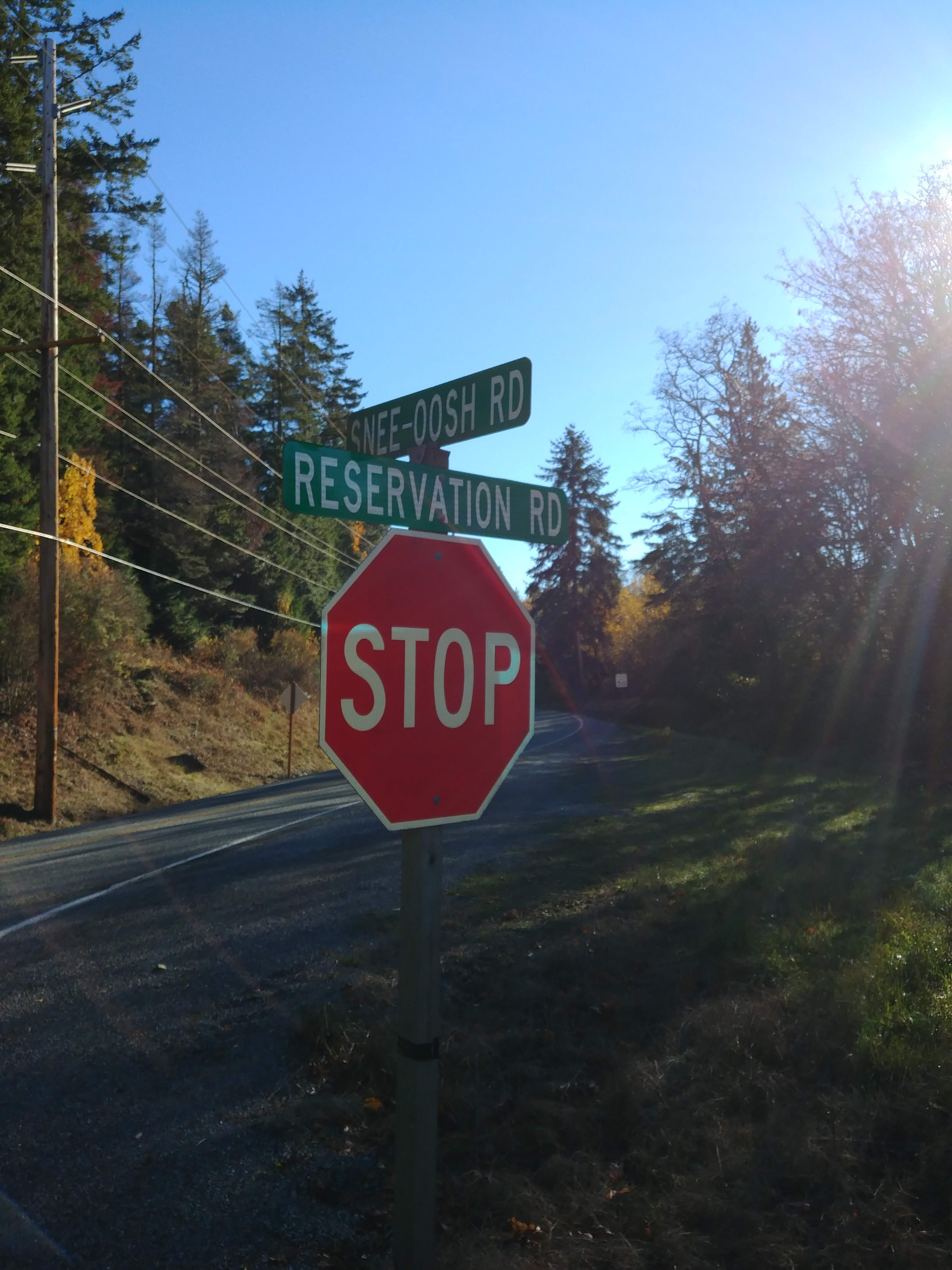
- Intersection of Snee-Oosh Road and Reservation Road

- Location within Washington (state)
- Coordinates: 48°25′20″N 122°33′16″W
- Country: United States
- State: Washington
- County: Skagit
- Named for: "look the other way"
- Elevation: 82 ft (25 m)

Population
  - Total: 302
- Time zone: UTC-8 (Pacific (PST))
  - Summer (DST): UTC-7 (PDT)
- Area code(s): 360, 564
- GNIS feature ID: 1867634

Snee Oosh (also spelled Snee-Oosh or Snee-oosh; Lushootseed: sdiʔus) is a populated place on Fidalgo Island in the U.S. state of Washington, on the Swinomish Indian Reservation. The population was reported as 302 in 1999.

There is also a Snee Oosh Point at 48°24′01″N 122°32′51″W, and Snee Oosh Beach at 48°24′07″N 122°32′38″W.

== History ==
Snee Oosh is the site of one of the main Swinomish villages occupied in historic times. The name "Snee Oosh" is derived from the Lushootseed name, sdiʔus, which means "look the other way."

== Kukutali Preserve ==
The Kukutali Preserve, an extension of Deception Pass State Park jointly administered by the Swinomish and Washington State Parks in a unique arrangement, is adjacent to Snee Oosh, and occupies the entirety of Flagstaff Island and Kiket Island. It is the first state–tribal co-managed park in the United States. Kiket Island was once the planned site of a nuclear power plant.

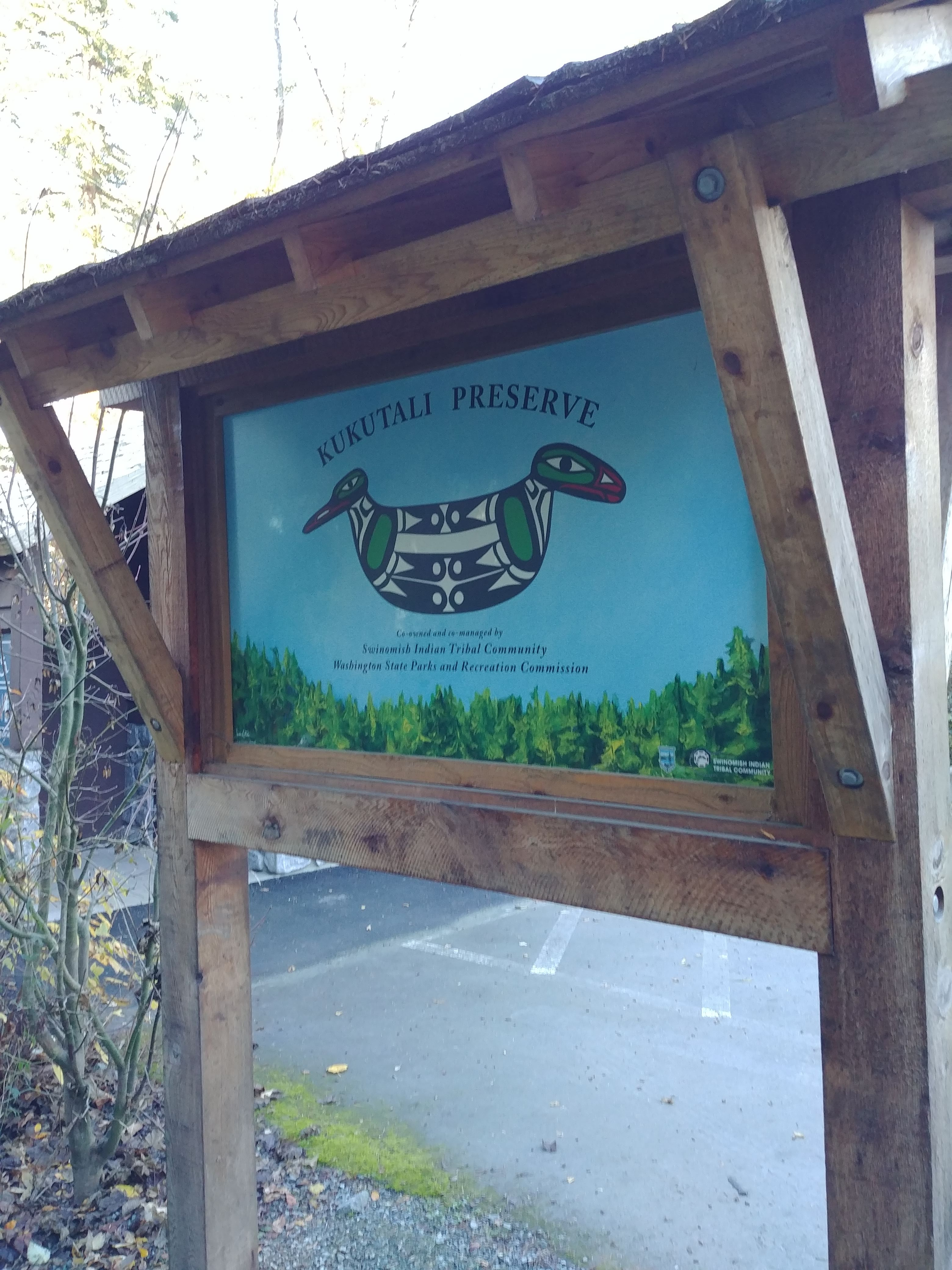
Kukutali Preserve in Snee Oosh
