= Kiket Island =

Washingtonian islet

Coordinates: 48°25′09″N 122°34′02″W

kʷuʔkʷuʔtali
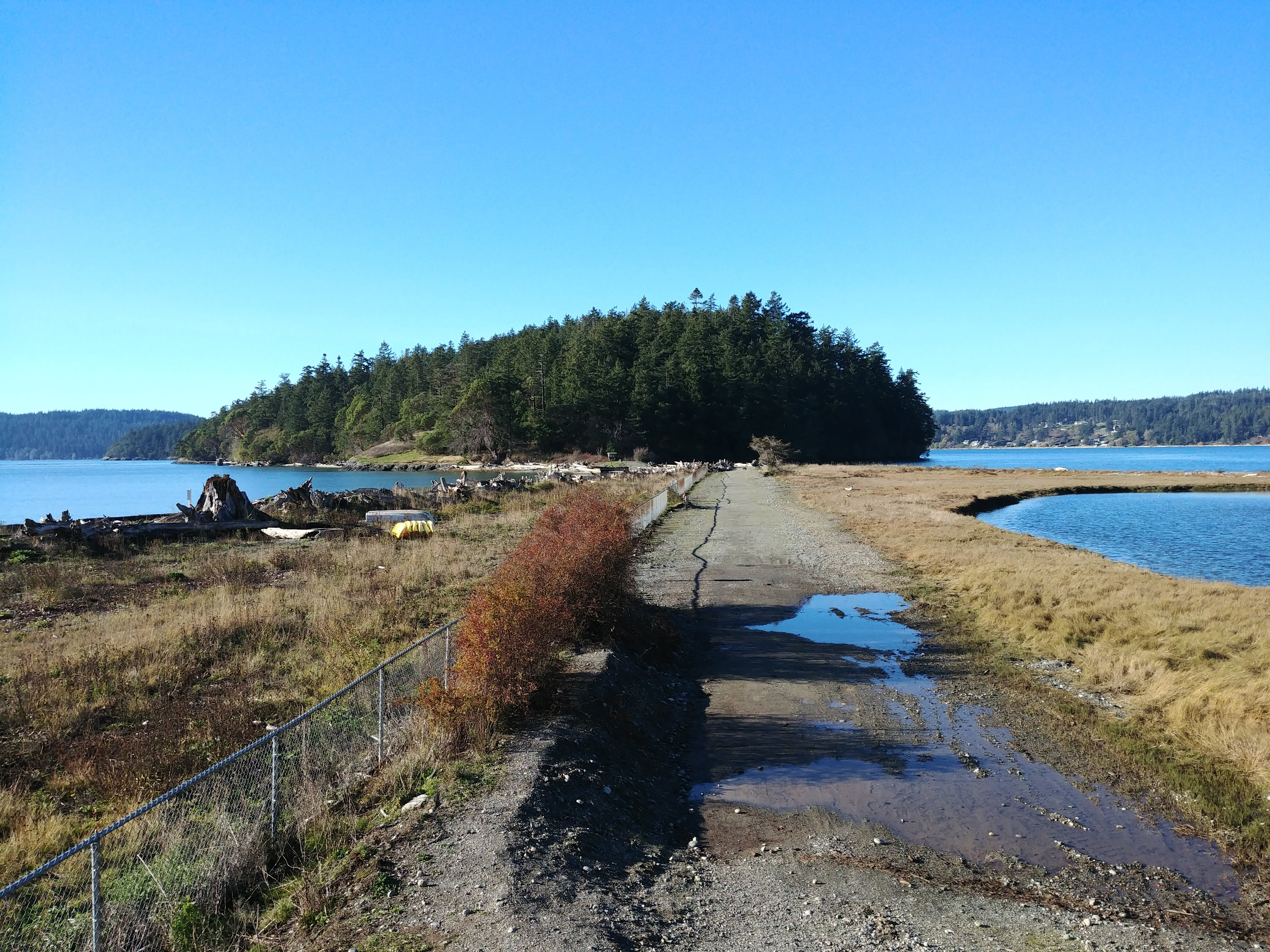
- Kiket Island, as seen from Fidalgo Island across the tombolo, sdᶻalgʷiɬ.
- Interactive map of Kiket Island
- Etymology: Place of cattail mat

Geography
- Location: Puget Sound

Administration
- Swinomish Indian Tribal Community and Washington State

Kiket Island (Lushootseed: kʷuʔkʷuʔtali) is a small tied island in Washington, co-managed by the Washington State Parks and Recreation Commission and the Swinomish Indian Tribal Community. Located at Snee Oosh, less than four miles (6.4 km) northwest of the town of La Conner in Skagit County, Washington, Kiket is connected to Fidalgo Island by a tombolo called sdᶻalgʷiɬ, over which runs an access road. The name "Kiket" is derived from the Lushootseed-language name of the island, kʷuʔkʷuʔtali. The name means "place of cattail mat." The small spit connecting the two is called sdᶻalgʷiɬ, 'changing canoes'.

== Geography ==
Hope Island lies to the south of Kiket; Skagit Island only a few hundred feet to the southwest. These islands can be said to divide Skagit Bay from Similk Bay. The shoreline of Kiket Island and vicinity has been called one of the best-studied areas of coastal Washington. Ecological studies were made in the last decades of the twentieth century, when the site was considered for a nuclear power plant.

== History ==
In 1969, Seattle City Light and Snohomish County PUD considered building a $250 million 1,100 MW nuclear power plant on the island. By 1972, the plan for the nuclear plant was dropped due to environmental concerns. Seattle City Light and Snohomish County PUD sold the property in 1980.

On June 23, 2010, a joint ownership agreement was signed by the state Parks and Recreation Commission and the Swinomish Indian Tribal Community. Both Kiket and tiny Flagstaff Island (connected to Kiket by another tombolo) are included in the agreement, and are part of Deception Pass State Park. The partners and The Trust for Public Land gathered grants and donations from a range of sources to purchase the $14 million property. As part of the acquisition process, wildlife surveys were conducted in the winter of 2008–2009.

The park is open to the public with restrooms at the parking lot accessed via Snee-Oosh Road and on the west end of the island.
