= Skagit Island =

Islet in Washington, United States

Coordinates: 48°24′49″N 122°34′45″W

Skagit Island is a 21-acre islet located in the north Puget Sound of Washington state. Found south of Fidalgo island in the Skagit bay, the islet is home to Skagit Island Marine State Park with a basic trail system surrounding it.
