= Ika Island =

Island in Washington, United States

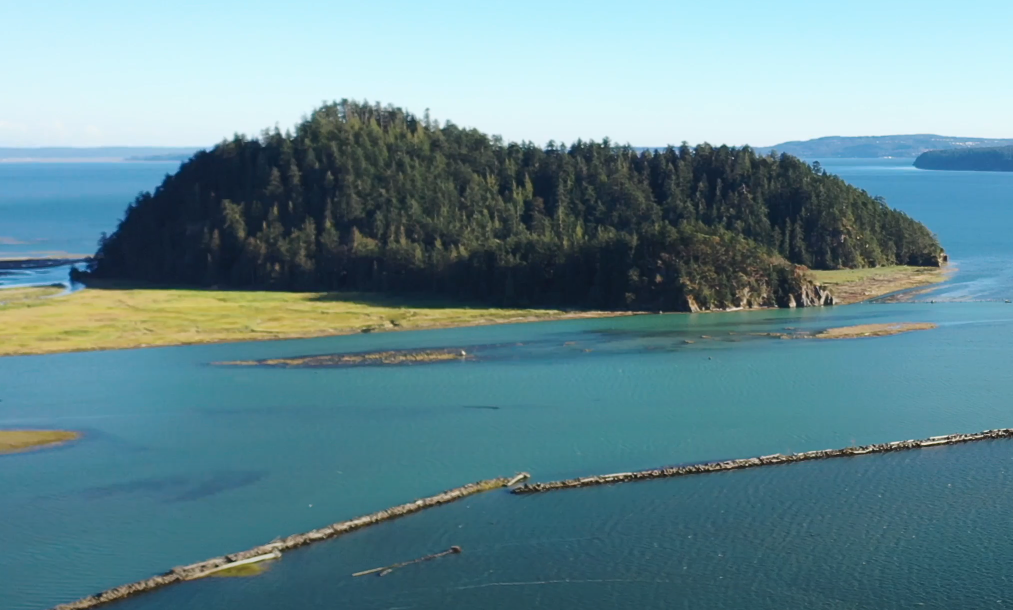
- Ika Island, in Skagit Bay, taken from the west, with jetty in the foreground.

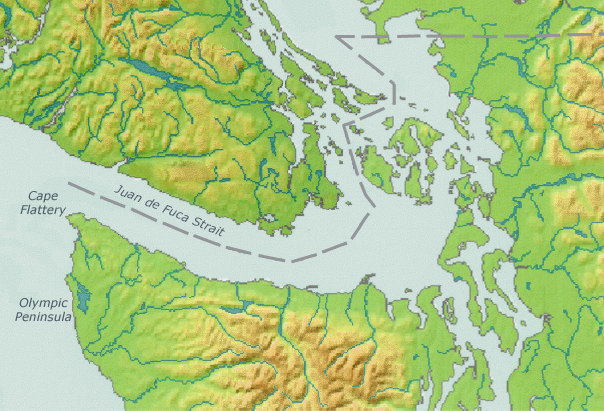
- Location within Strait of Juan de Fuca Location within Washington (state)

Geography
- Location: Skagit Bay, Washington, United States
- Coordinates: 48°21′41″N 122°30′09″W
- Area: 1.5 km^{2} (0.58 sq mi)
- Length: 1.2 km (0.75 mi)
- Width: 0.8 km (0.5 mi)
- Highest elevation: 135 m (443 ft)

Administration
- United States
- State: Washington
- County: Skagit County

Demographics
- Population: Uninhabited (2021)
- Pop. density: 0/km^{2} (0/sq mi)

Ika Island is an uninhabited island, under private ownership, located in Skagit Bay, in the United States state of Washington. The island is approximately 1.5 square kilometers (0.58 square miles) in size, measuring 1.2 kilometers (0.75 miles) long and 0.8 kilometers (0.5 miles) wide. Ika Island is part of Skagit County and is situated to the west of the mainland.

== Geography ==
Ika Island features a mostly forested landscape with a mixture of coniferous and deciduous trees. The island's highest point is approximately 135 meters above sea level. The coastline is characterized by rocky shores and small beaches, providing a variety of habitats for wildlife.

== Ecology ==
The island is home to numerous species of flora and fauna, some of which are unique to the region. Bird species commonly found on the island include bald eagles, great blue herons, and osprey. The island's diverse ecosystems also support a variety of marine life, such as harbor seals, Dungeness crabs, and salmon.

== See also ==
- List of islands of Washington
