= Deception Pass =

Strait between Whidbey and Fidalgo Islands on Puget Sound

- sčudᶻ (Lushootseed); Xwchsónges (Straits Salish)
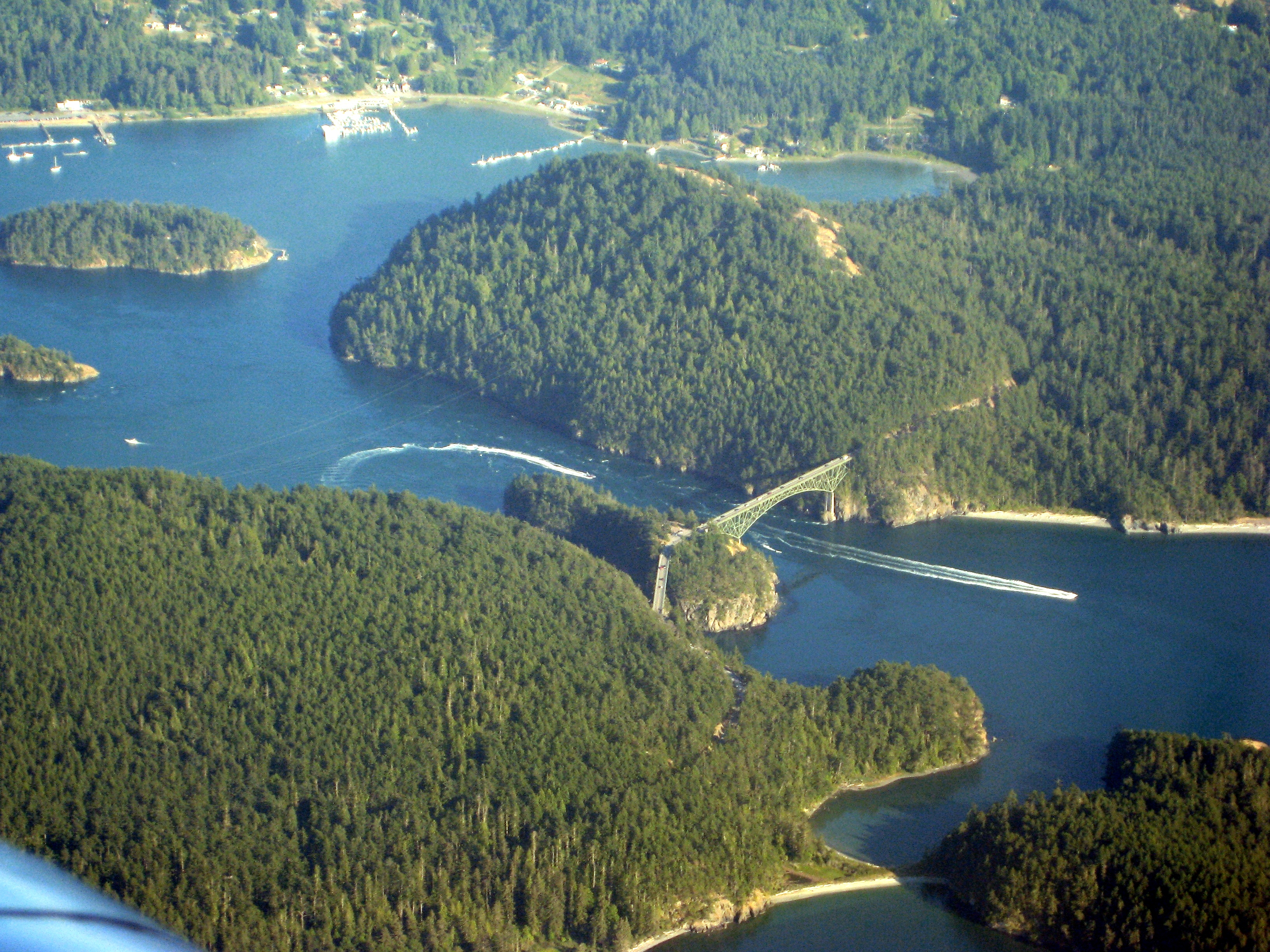
- Aerial view of Deception Pass looking southeast
- Interactive map of Deception Pass
- Location: Between Fidalgo and Whidbey Islands, Washington, United States
- Coordinates: 48°24′23″N 122°38′40″W
- Type: Strait
- Etymology: Named by George Vancouver (1792)
- Part of: Salish Sea
- Primary inflows: Skagit Bay
- Primary outflows: Strait of Juan de Fuca

Deception Pass (Lushootseed: sčudᶻ; Samish: Xwchsónges) is a strait separating Whidbey Island from Fidalgo Island, in the northwest part of the U.S. state of Washington. It connects Skagit Bay, part of Puget Sound, with the Strait of Juan de Fuca. A pair of bridges known collectively as Deception Pass Bridge cross Deception Pass. The bridges were added to the National Register of Historic Places in 1982.

== History ==
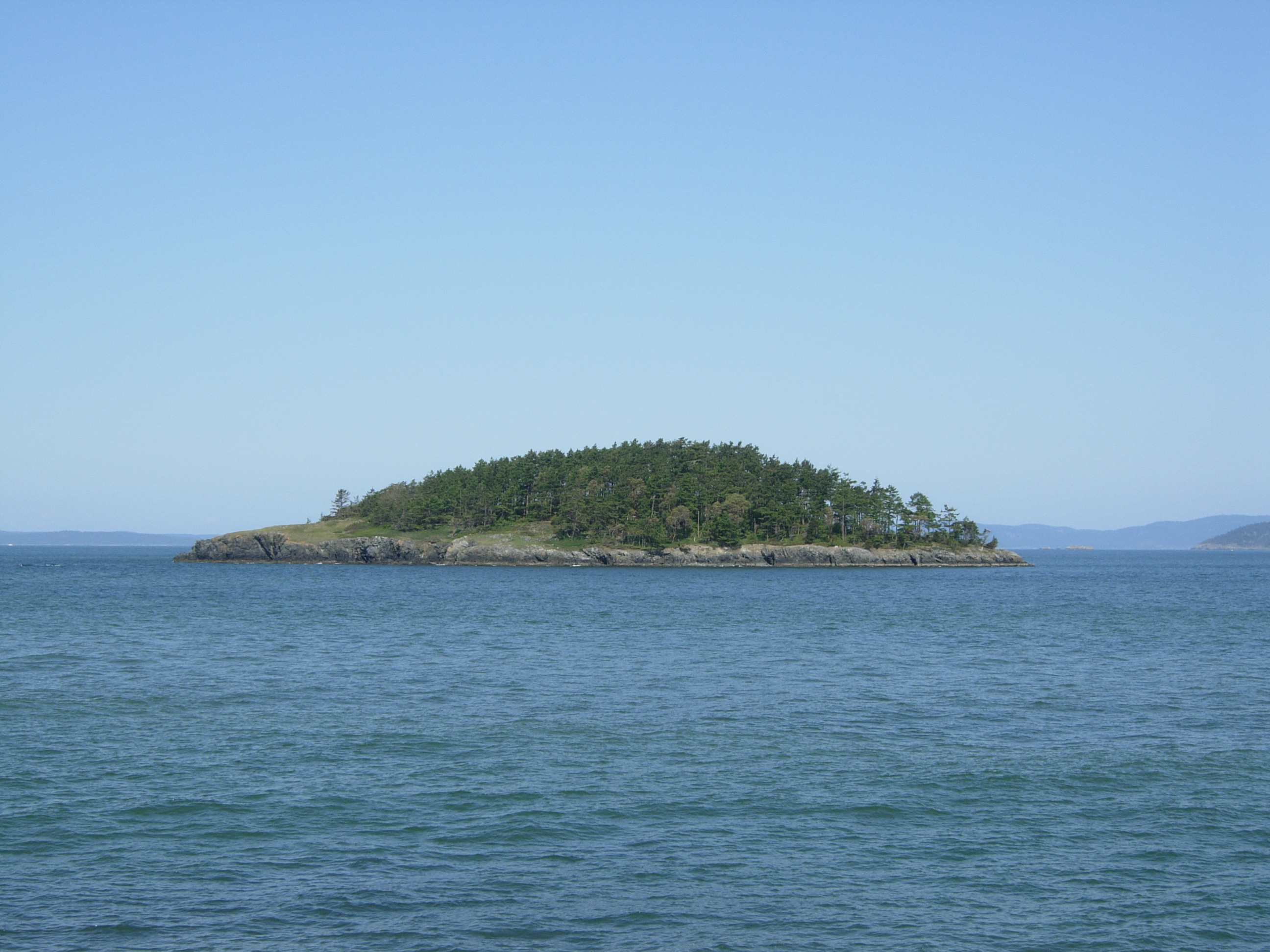
Deception Island

The Deception Pass area has been home to various Coast Salish tribes for thousands of years. The first Europeans to see Deception Pass were members of the 1790 expedition of Manuel Quimper on the Princesa Real. The Spanish gave it the name Boca de Flon.

A group of sailors led by Joseph Whidbey, part of the Vancouver Expedition, found and mapped Deception Pass on June 7, 1792. George Vancouver gave it the name "Deception" because it had misled him into thinking Whidbey Island was a peninsula. The "deception" was heightened due to Whidbey's failure to find the strait at first. In May 1792, Vancouver was anchored near the southern end of Whidbey Island. He sent Joseph Whidbey to explore the waters east of Whidbey Island, now known as Saratoga Passage, using small boats. Whidbey reached the northern end of Saratoga Passage and explored eastward into Skagit Bay, which is shallow and difficult to navigate. He returned south to rejoin Vancouver without having found Deception Pass. It appeared that Skagit Bay was a dead-end and that Whidbey Island and Fidalgo Island were a long peninsula attached to the mainland. In June, the expedition sailed north along the west coast of Whidbey Island. Vancouver sent Joseph Whidbey to explore inlets leading to the east. The first inlet turned out to be a "very narrow and intricate channel, which...abounded with rocks above and beneath the surface of the water". This channel led to Skagit Bay, thus separating Whidbey Island from the mainland. Vancouver apparently felt he and Joseph Whidbey had been deceived by the tricky strait. Vancouver wrote of Whidbey's efforts: "This determined [the shore they had been exploring] to be an island, which, in consequence of Mr. Whidbey’s circumnavigation, I distinguished by the name of Whidbey’s Island: and this northern pass, leading into [Skagit Bay], Deception Passage".

In the waters of Deception Pass, just east of the present-day Deception Pass Bridge, is a small island known as Ben Ure Island. The island became infamous for its activity of human smuggling of migrant Chinese people for local labor. Ben Ure and his partner Lawrence "Pirate" Kelly were quite profitable at their human smuggling business and played hide-and-seek with the United States Customs Department for years. Ure's own operation at Deception Pass in the late 1880s consisted of Ure and his Native-American wife. Local tradition has it that his wife would camp on the nearby Strawberry Island (which was visible from the open sea) and signal him with a fire on the island's summit to alert him to whether or not it was safe to attempt to bring the human cargo he illegally transported ashore. For transport, Ure would tie the people up in burlap bags so that if customs agents approached he could toss the bagged people overboard. The tidal currents carried the entrapped drowned migrants' bodies to San Juan Island to the north and west of the pass; many ended up in Dead Man's Bay.

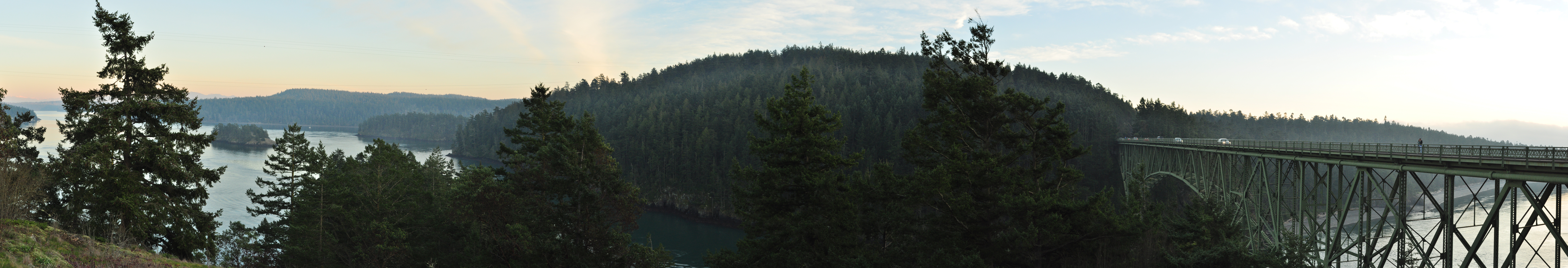
View looking south from Pass Island. From left to right, are visible Strawberry Island, part of Ben Ure Island, the bulk of Whidbey Island and the south span of the Deception Pass Bridge.

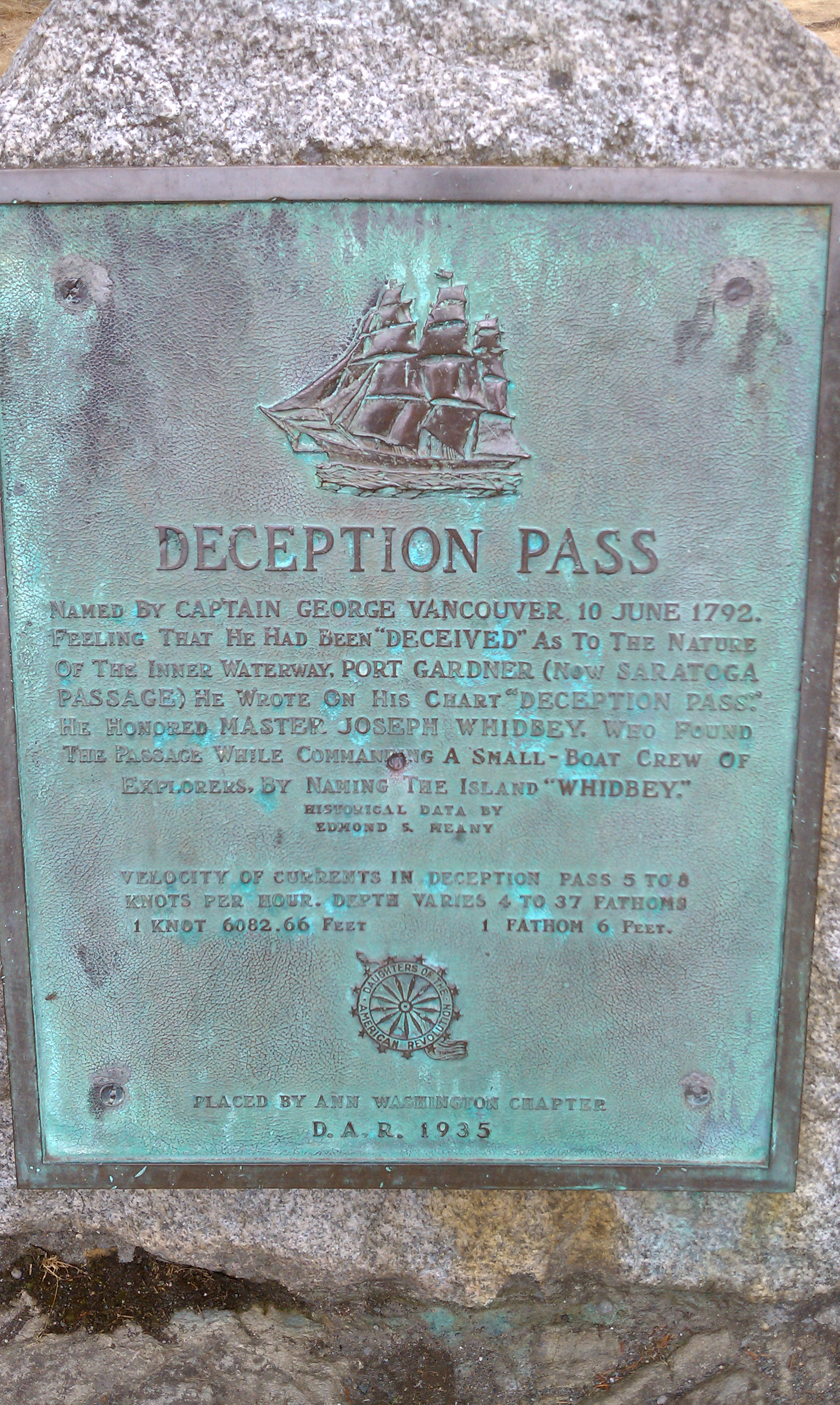
Plaque explaining the history of Deception Pass: "Deception Pass - Named By Captain George Vancouver 10 June 1792. Feeling That He Had Been 'Deceived' As To The Nature Of The Inner Waterway, Port Gardner (Now Saratoga Passage) he Wrote On His Chart 'Deception Pass.'"

Between 1910 and 1914, a prison rock quarry was operated on the Fidalgo Island side of the pass. Nearby barracks housed some 40 prisoners (at least 25 in 1909, 48 in 1911, only 6 by 1913), members of an honors program out of Walla Walla State Penitentiary and the prison population was made up of several types of prisoners, including those convicted of murder. Guards stood watch at the quarry as prisoners cut the rock into gravel and loaded it onto barges at the base of the cliff atop the pass's waters. The quarried rock was then barged to the Seattle waterfront. The camp was dismantled in 1924 and although abandoned as a quarry, the remains of the camp can still be seen. The location is hazardous; over the years there have been several fatal accidents when visitors have ventured onto the steep cliffs. In 2006, the tunnel was sealed off due to these fatalities.

A ferry was established by 1916 to connect Whidbey and Fidalgo Islands. It was discontinued after July 31, 1935, when the 976-foot (297 m) Deception Pass Bridge opened, connecting Whidbey Island to the tiny Pass Island, and Pass Island to Fidalgo.

== Currents ==
Deception Pass is a dramatic seascape where the tidal flow and whirlpools beneath the twin bridges connecting Fidalgo Island to Whidbey Island move quickly. During ebb and flood tide current speed reaches about 8 knots (9.2 mph), flowing in opposite directions between ebb and flood. This swift current can lead to standing waves, large whirlpools, and roiling eddies visible from the twin bridges' pedestrian walkways or from the trail leading below the larger south bridge from the parking lot on the Whidbey Island side. Boats can be seen waiting on either side of the pass for the current to stop or change direction before going through. Thrill-seeking kayakers go there during large tide changes to surf the standing waves and brave the class 2 and 3 rapid conditions.

== Scuba diving ==
Diving Deception Pass is dangerous and only for competent and prepared divers. There are a few times each year that the tides are right for a drift dive from the cove, under the bridge, and back to the cove as the tide changes. These must be planned well in advance by divers who know how to read currents and are aware of the dangerous conditions. Because of the large tidal exchange, Deception Pass hosts a variety of colors and life in the Pacific Northwest. The walls and bottom are covered in colorful invertebrates, lingcod, greenlings, and barnacles.

== State park ==
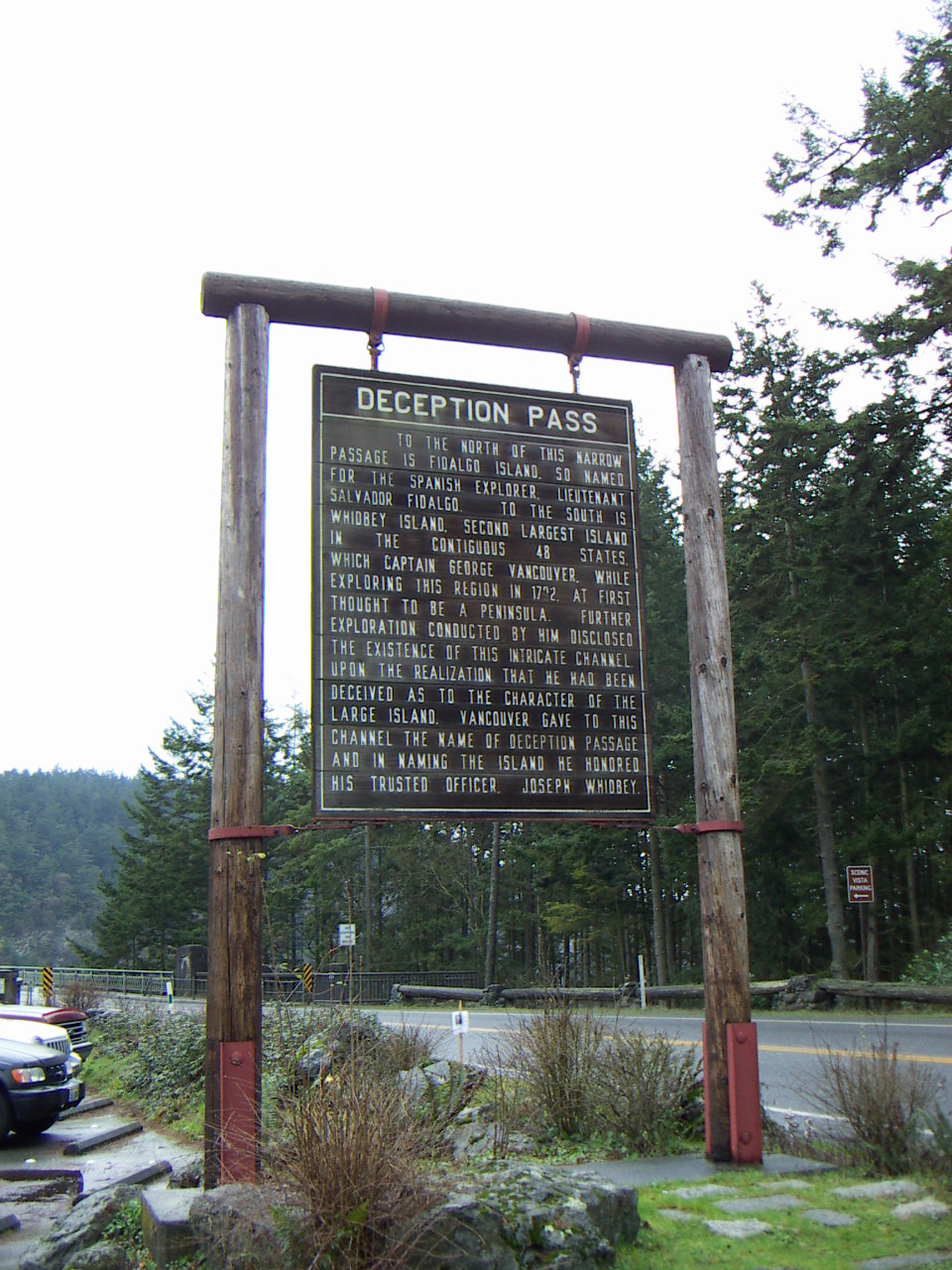
Tourist sign at Deception Pass State Park

Deception Pass is surrounded by 3,854-acre (1,560 ha) Deception Pass State Park, one of the most visited Washington state parks with over two million annual visitors.

=== History ===
The park was established in 1923, when the original 1,600 acres (650 ha) of a military reserve was transferred to Washington State Parks. The park's facilities were improved in the 1930s by the Civilian Conservation Corps (CCC), which built roads, trails, and buildings. The road to West Beach was created in 1950, opening the beach to vehicles. The former fish hatchery at Bowman Bay became a part of the park in the early 1970s. The old entrance to the park was closed in 1997 when a new entrance was created at the intersection of Highway 20 and Cornet Bay road, improving access into and out of the park.

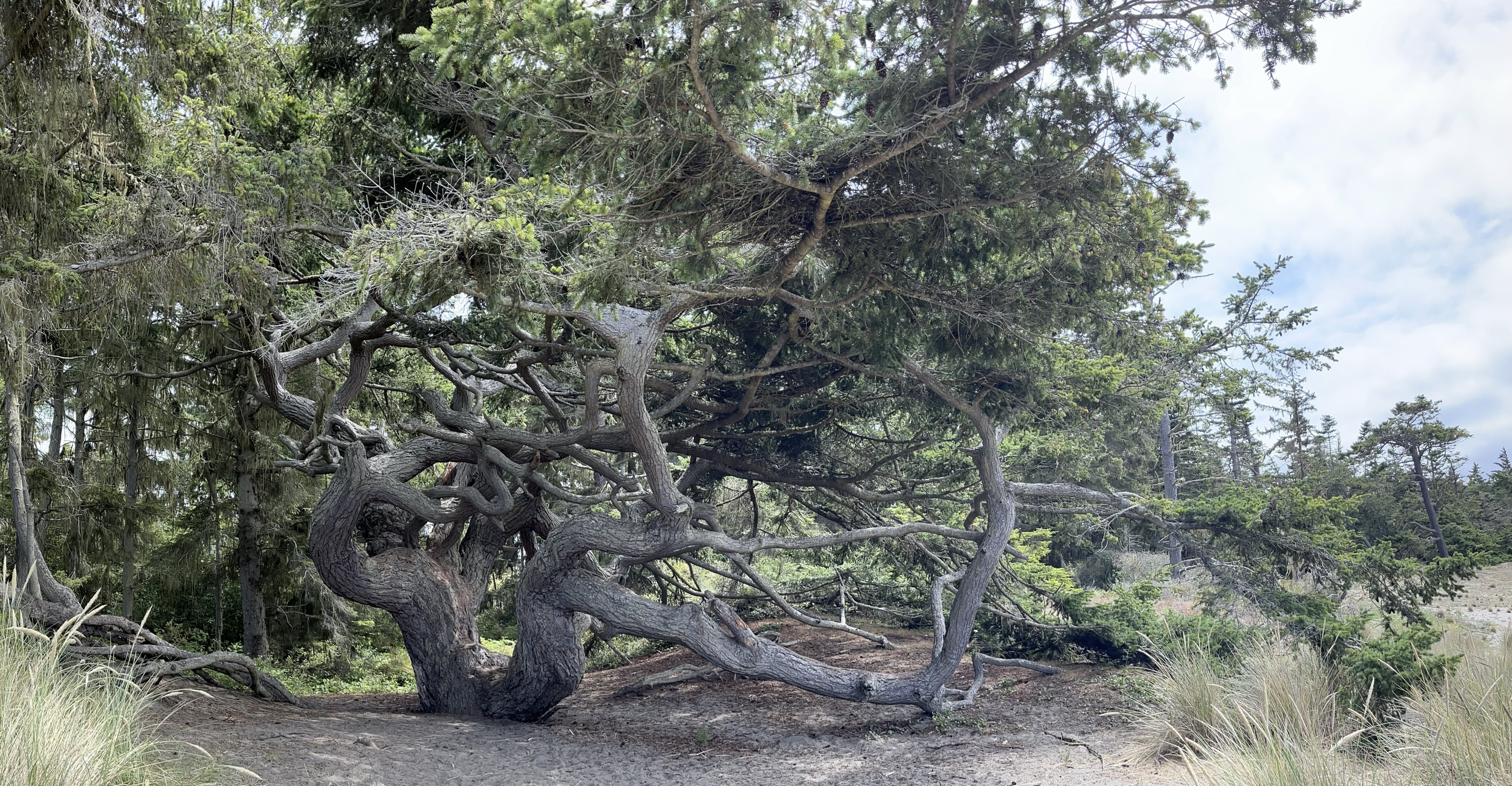
Douglas fir tree estimated to be 850 years old at Deception Pass State Park

=== Activities and amenities ===
The park's recreational facilities include campgrounds, hiking trails, beaches, and tidepools. Several miles of the Pacific Northwest Trail are within the park, including the section that crosses Deception Pass on the Highway 20 bridge. The Cornet Bay Retreat Center provides cabins and dining and recreation facilities. Cornet Bay offers boat launches and fishing, while Bowman Bay has an interpretive center that explains the story of the Civilian Conservation Corps throughout Washington state. Near the center is a CCC honor statue, which can be found in 30 U.S. states. Fishing is popular in Pass Lake, on the north side of the bridge. Boat rentals and guided tours of the park are also offered.

=== Islands ===
The park includes land on ten islands: Northwest Island, Deception Island, Pass Island, Strawberry, Ben Ure, Kiket, Skagit, Hope, and Big and Little Deadman Islands. Ben Ure Island is partially privately owned. The island is not open to the public except for a small rentable cabin available via the state park, which is only accessible by rowboat.

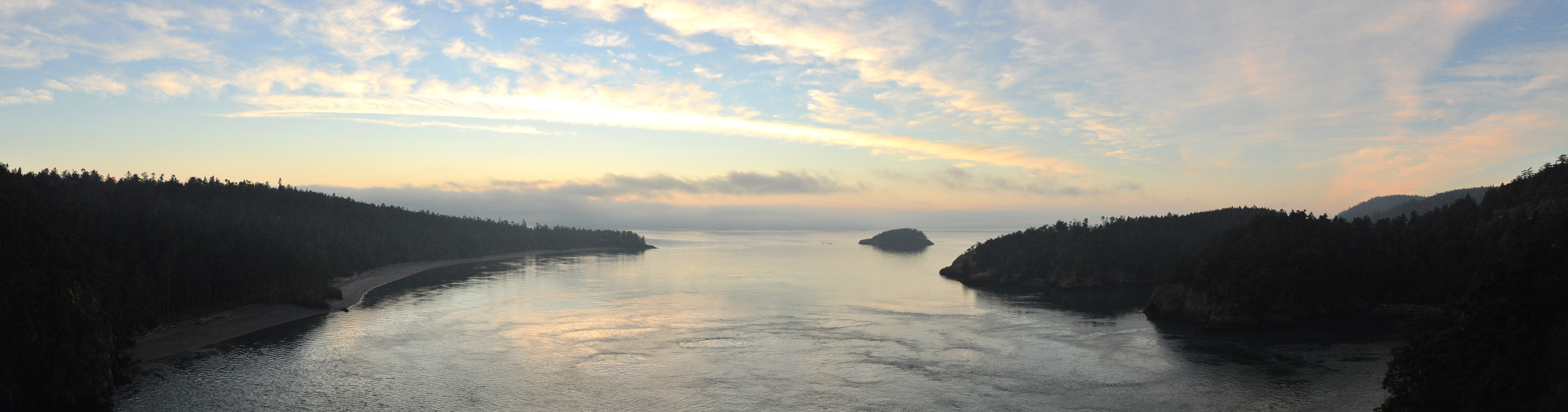
Looking roughly west from near the south span of the Deception Pass Bridge. Whidbey Island at left, Fidalgo Island at right, with the small Deception Island visible at center.

== In popular culture ==
Jonathan Raban's 1999 travel memoir Passage to Juneau describes the history of the pass and Raban's passage through it in a 30 ft yacht. The 2002 horror movie The Ring was in part filmed near the pass. The bridge is fictionalized as a toll bridge named "Desolation Bridge" in season one of The Killing. The bridge was also used as inspiration for the large bridge in the "Highway 17" chapter of Half-Life 2. Seattle shoegaze act The Sight Below filmed the 2008 video for their track "Further Away" at Deception Pass, with Deception Island's scenic imagery prominently featured. Seattle grunge band Mudhoney named a song on their 1993 EP Five Dollar Bob's Mock Cooter Stew "Deception Pass." Seattle progressive rock band Queensrÿche filmed scenes of their video "Anybody Listening" near Deception Pass and Deception Island.

== See also ==
- Juan Carrasco (explorer)
- Deception Pass State Park
- Deception Pass ferry
