= Skagit Island Marine State Park =

State park in the U.S. state of Washington

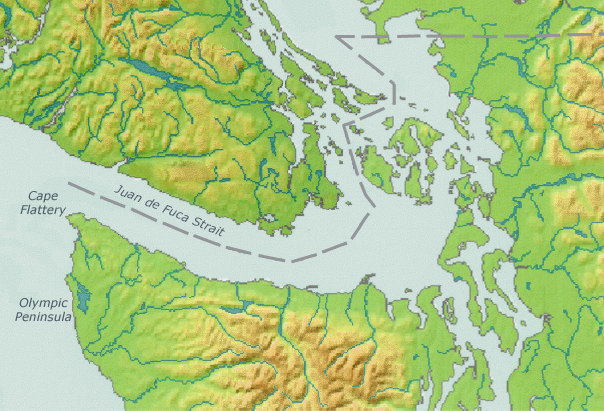
- Location within Strait of Juan de Fuca Location within Washington (state) Location within the United States
- Location: Skagit County, Washington, United States
- Coordinates: 48°24′49″N 122°34′45″W
- Area: 25 acres (10 ha)
- Elevation: 89 ft (27 m)
- Administrator: Washington State Parks and Recreation Commission
- Website: Official website

Skagit Island Marine State Park is a public recreation area comprising 25-acre (10 ha) Skagit Island in Skagit County, Washington. It is located in Skagit Bay, one mile (1.6 km) east of Hoypus Point and 1.5 miles (2.4 km) east of Cornet Bay in Deception Pass State Park and is accessible only by boat. The island is wooded with occasional meadows, rock outcrops, beach, and a land trail.
