= Hope Island State Park =

Hope Island State Park may refer to:

- Hope Island State Park (Mason County, Washington)
- Hope Island State Park (Skagit County, Washington)
