= Bowman Bay =

Bowman Bay may refer to:

- Bowman Bay, Nunavut, Canada
- Bowman Bay, Washington, United States
