= Cranberry Lake (Washington) =

Lake in Island County, Washington

Coordinates: 48°23′40″N 122°39′16″W

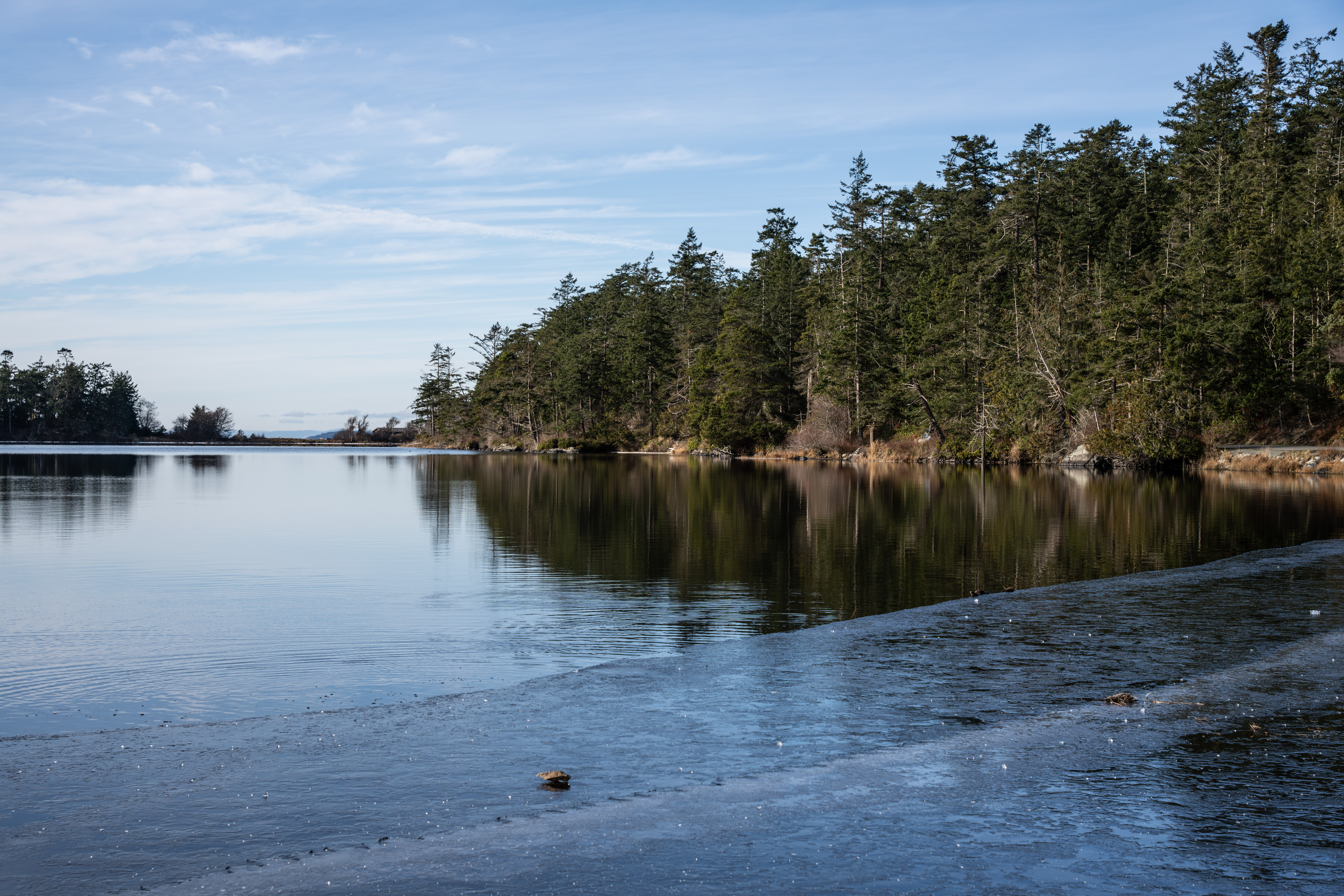
Cranberry Lake

Cranberry Lake is a lake inside Deception Pass State Park on Whidbey Island in Island County, Washington. It is often stocked with trout, making it popular among recreational anglers.
