= Strawberry Island (Deception Pass, Washington) =

Island in Washington, United States

Coordinates: 48°24′25.6″N 122°37′53.6″W

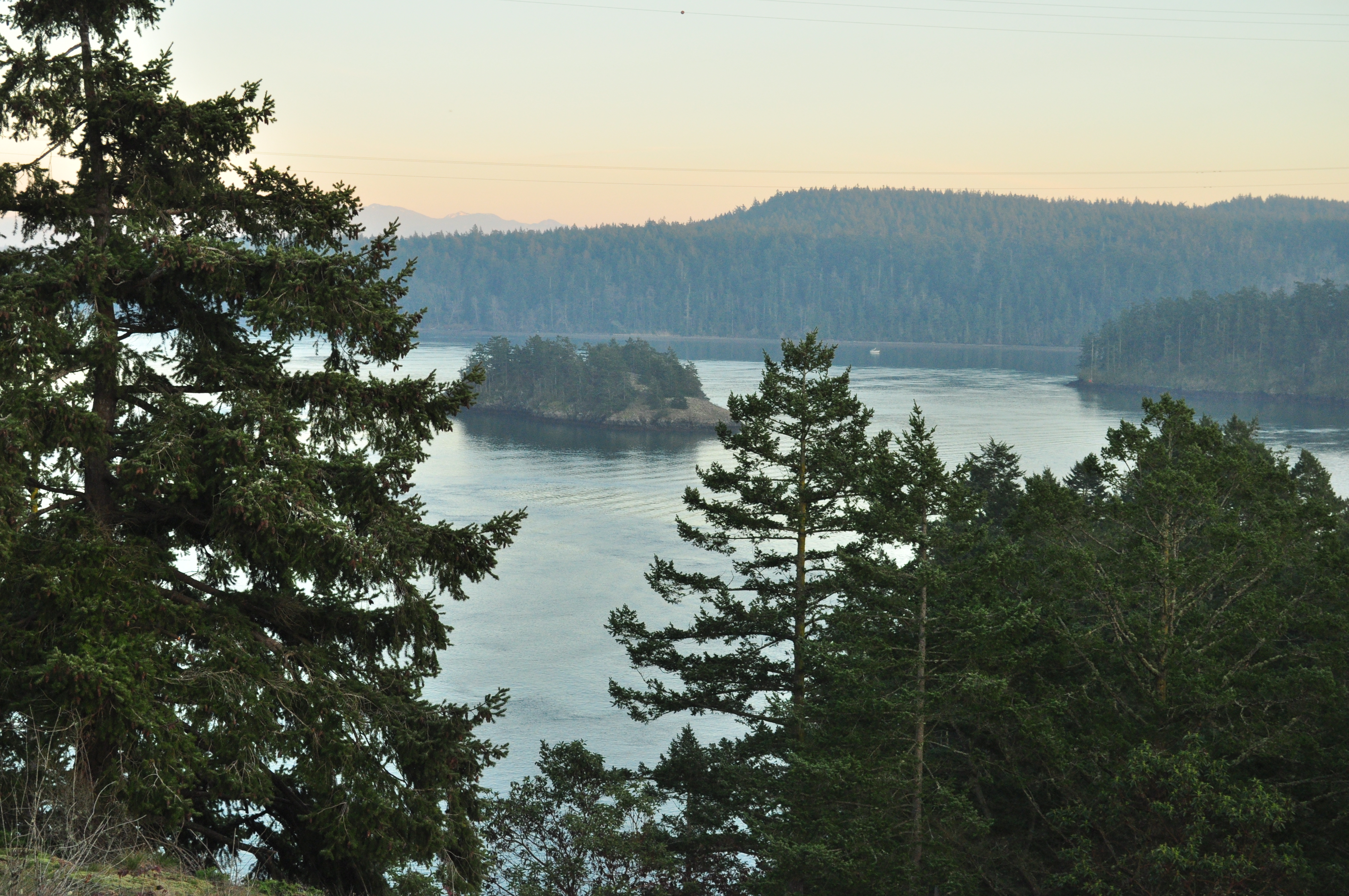
Strawberry Island

Strawberry Island is a small island in Island County, Washington, United States. It is located just east of Deception Pass, which separates Fidalgo Island (N) from Whidbey Island (S).

Charles Wilkes, during the Wilkes Expedition of 1838–1842, found wild strawberries on the island and gave it the name Hautboy, after the variety of strawberry. In time, the more common name Strawberry became official.

Another Strawberry Island is located several miles north, near Cypress Island.
