= Cornet Bay =

Bay in Washington, U.S.

Coordinates: 48.3973087°N 122.6356619°W

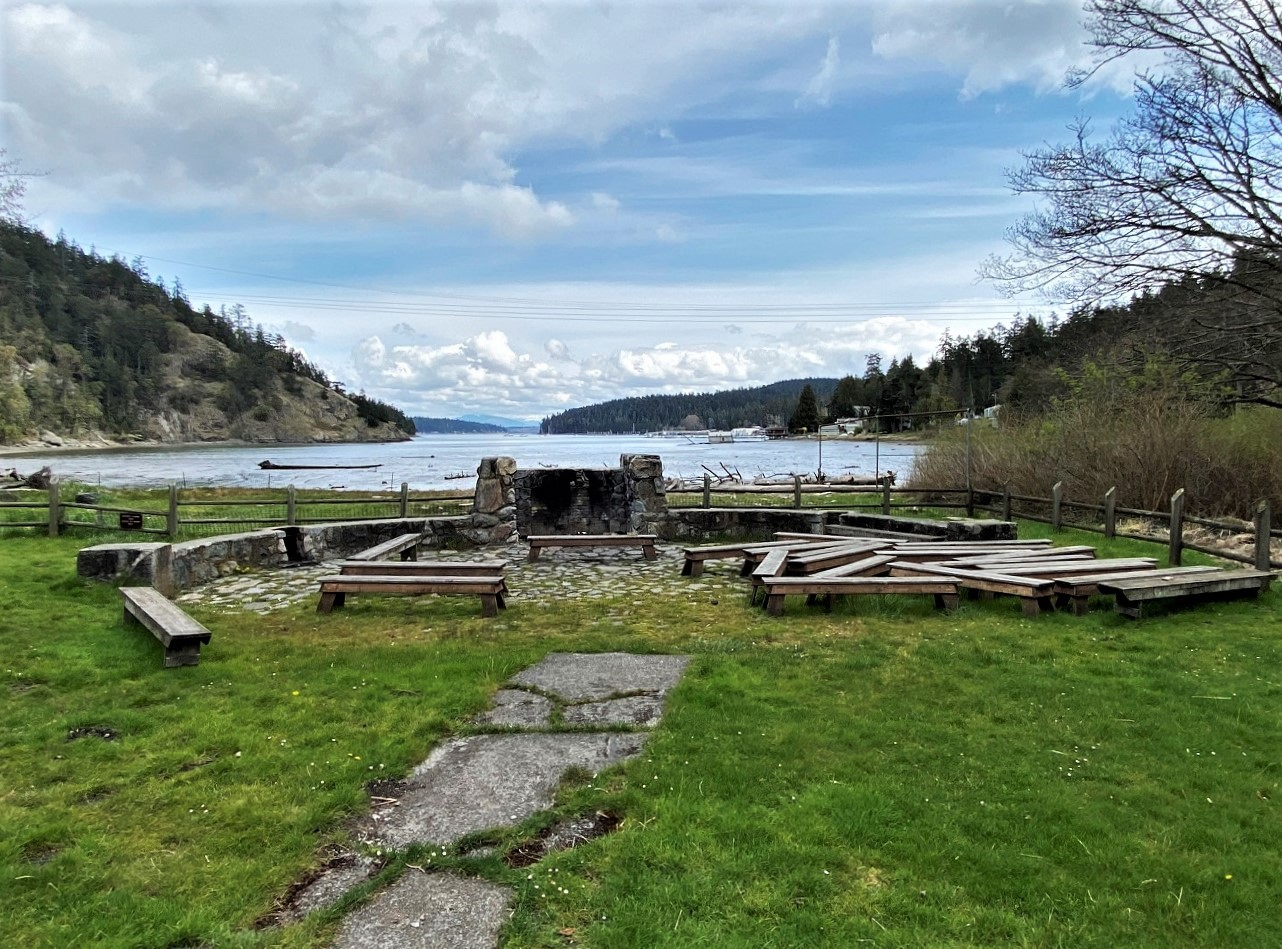
Cornet Bay pictured from the fire circle in Deception Pass State Park

Cornet Bay is a bay of Whidbey Island in Island County, Washington, United States. Cornet Bay was named after John Cornet, a pioneer settler.

== See also ==
- Deception Pass State Park#Cornet Bay Fire Circle
- Deception Pass State Park#Cornet Bay Incinerator
