= Bowman Bay (Washington) =

Coordinates: 48°24′56″N 122°39′16″W

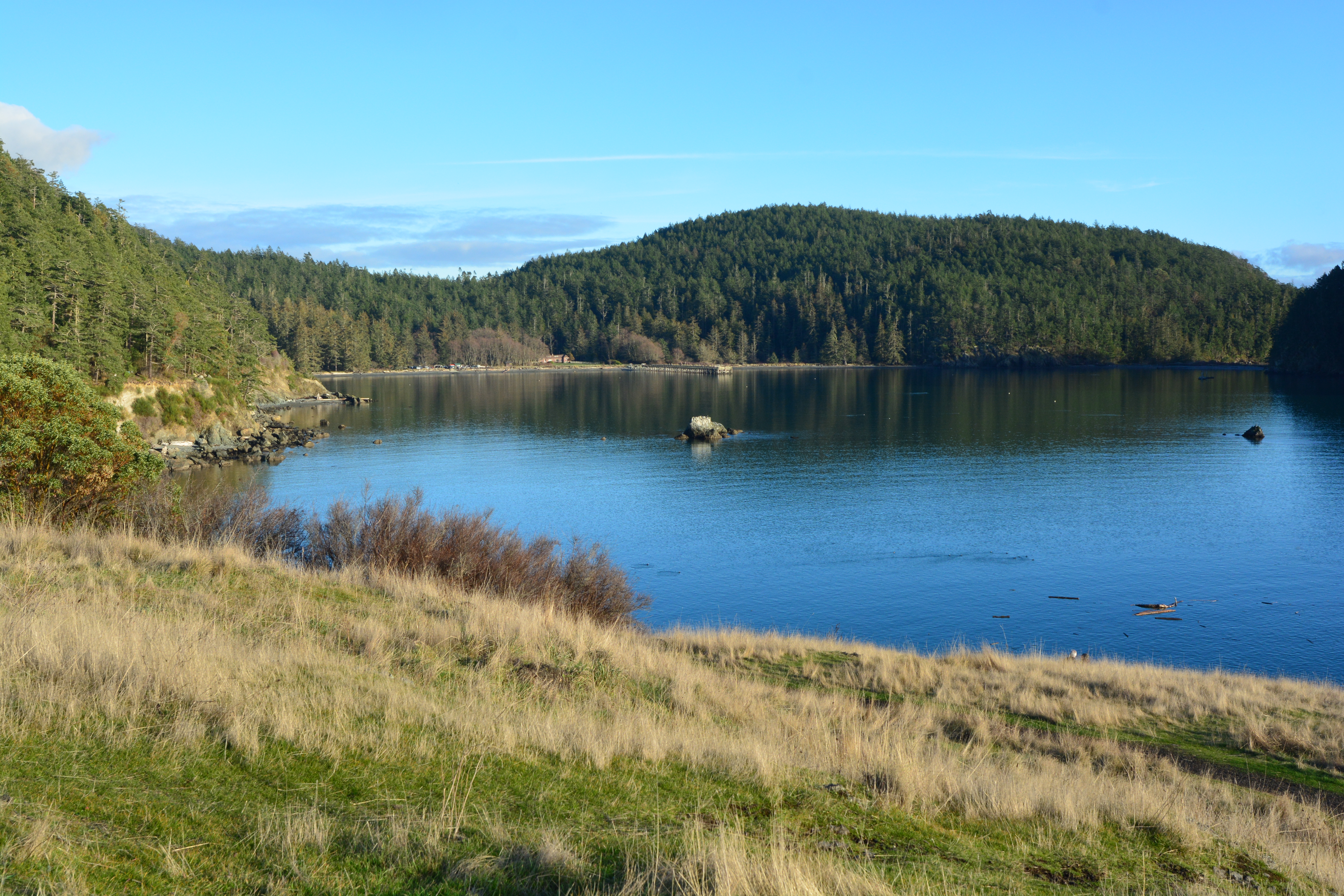
Bowman Bay from Rosario Head

Bowman Bay is a bay in the state of Washington, United States. It was formerly called Reservation Bay, having been part of a military reservation. In 1977 it was given its current name in honor of Amos Bowman, an American settler of nearby Fidalgo Island. The name of Anacortes on Fidalgo Island is derived from the name of Bowman's wife, Anna Curtis.

The bay is now part of Deception Pass State Park.
