= Deception Pass (King County, Washington) =

Cascade Range pass in Washington, United States

- Interactive map of Deception Pass
- Elevation: 4,475 feet (1,364 m)
- Traversed by: Pacific Crest Trail, United States Forest Service trails

Third Approach
- Location: King and Kittitas counties, Washington, USA
- Range: Cascade Range
- Coordinates: 47°35′39″N 121°8′26″W

Deception Pass is a 4,475 feet (1,364 m) mountain pass in Washington state's central Cascade Range. It is located along the Cascade crest on the boundary line between King County to the west and Kittitas County to the east. It separates the Snohomish River watershed via Deception Creek on its west side and the Yakima River watershed via Hyas Lake and the Cle Elum River on its east side. Due to its location, it is also on the boundary between the Mount Baker–Snoqualmie and the Okanogan–Wenatchee national forests and is included in the latter's Alpine Lakes Wilderness area. The pass is located between Stevens Pass to the north and Snoqualmie Pass to the south. Deception Pass is accessed via the Pacific Crest Trail, as well as foot trails from Deception Creek and Tucquala Meadows.
