= Bull kelp =

Species of kelp

Bull kelp is a common name for the brown alga Nereocystis luetkeana which is a true kelp in the family Laminariaceae. It grows in coastal waters. It ranges from Unimak Island, Alaska to California, but there is more of it north of San Francisco.

Species in the genus Durvillaea are also sometimes called "bull kelp". Durvillaea is a genus in the order Fucales and, though superficially similar in appearance, is not a true kelp (all of which are in the order Laminariales).

== Gallery ==
Bull kelp and southern bull kelps
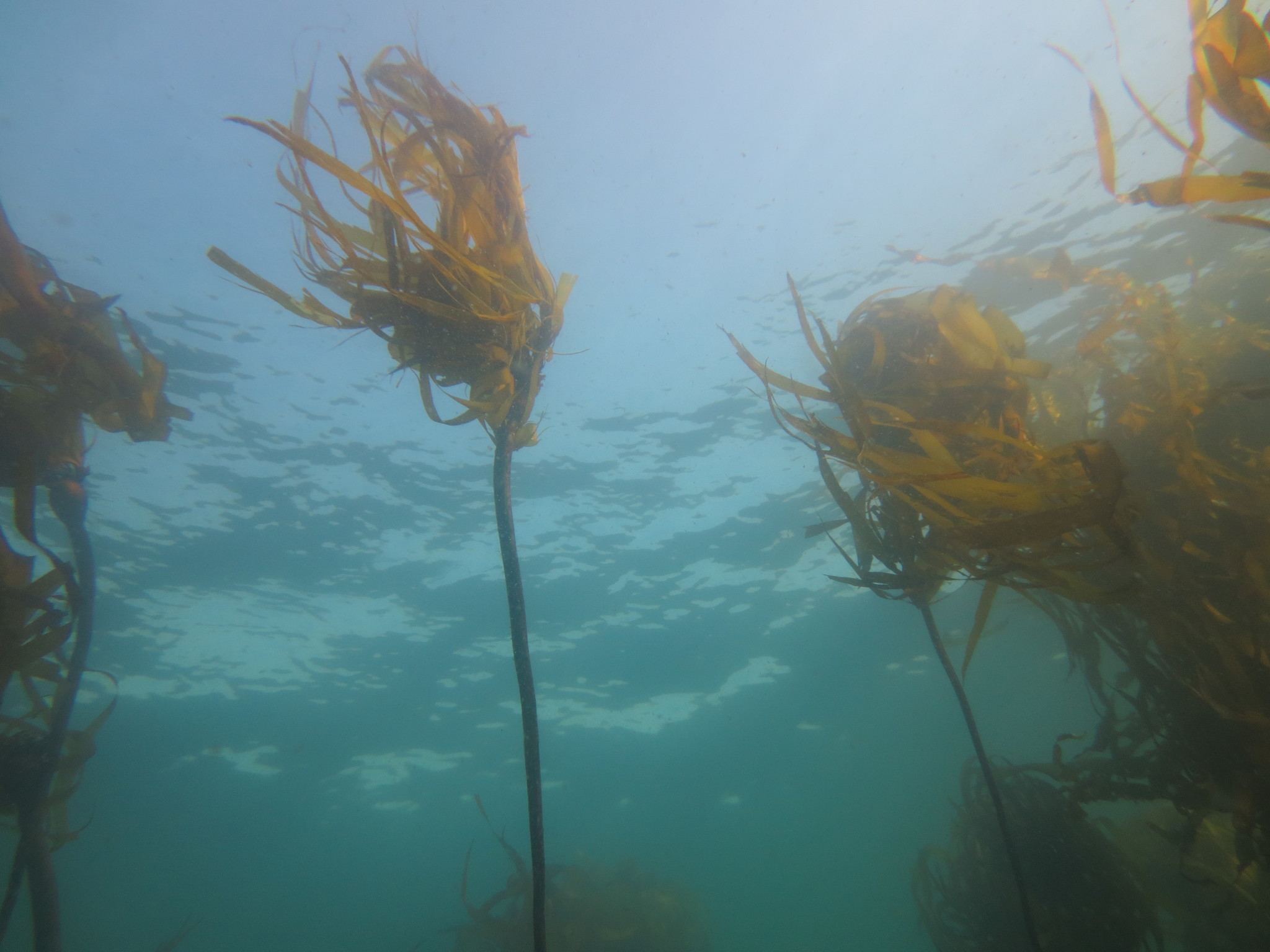
Bull kelp (Nereocystis luetkeana) at Caspar Point, California

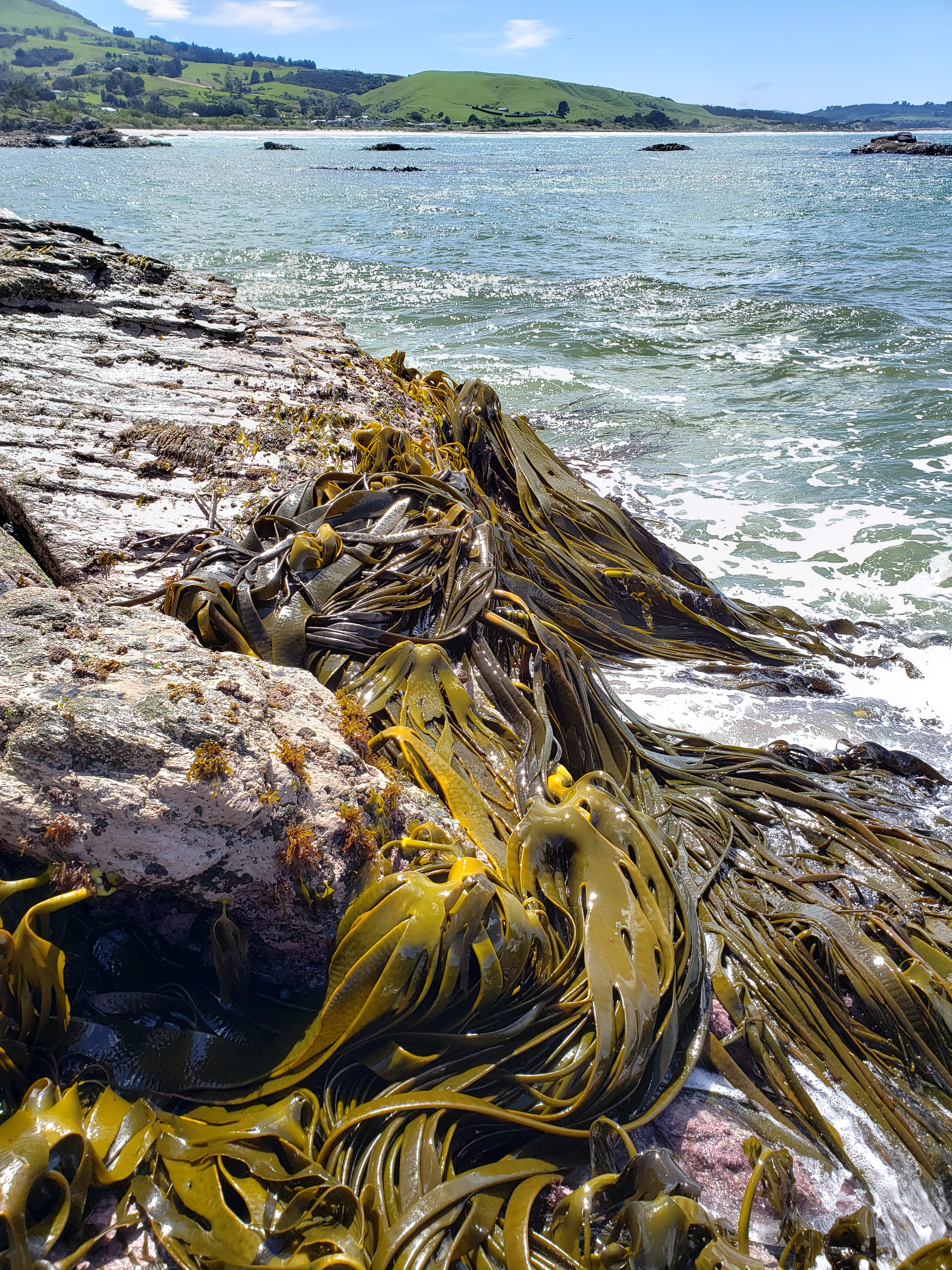
Southern bull kelps (Durvillaea) in Otago, New Zealand
