= Deception Pass ferry =

Defunct ferry route in Washington state

Deception Pass Ferry
- Motor ferry Deception Pass.
- Waterway: Deception Pass
- Ended operation: 1935
- Successor: Deception Pass Bridge
- Travel time: 5 minutes
- Frequency: hourly, 7:30 am to 7:30 pm.

The Deception Pass ferry was a ferry route in Washington State that ran between Fidalgo Island and Whidbey Island across Deception Pass.

== History ==
A ferry across Deception Pass was first proposed by Island and Skagit county commissioners in 1912, and service was inaugurated in the late spring of 1913. From 1924 to 1935, the route was run by Berte H. Olson (1882–1959), and her husband, O.A. Olson, who held a state highway contract. Berte Olson was the first woman to hold a ferry captain's license in Washington state.

The Olsons had a ferry built specifically for the route. This was the Deception Pass, 68.8 ft (20.97 m) long by 24 ft (7.32 m) beam, constructed by the Ballard Marine Yard in June 1924. The fee for car and driver was 50 cents, with 10 cents additional for every extra passenger, with "extra large" cars paying 75 cents. Service was hourly, and the transit time was only five minutes. Patrons were cautioned that the schedule was "subject to storms, breakdowns, and conditions beyond our control."

== Discontinuation ==
The route was discontinued when the Deception Pass Bridge was completed in 1935. For years, Berte Olson fought a political struggle against the bridge, even persuading Governor Roland Hartley to veto a funding bill that had been unanimously passed by the Washington State Legislature in 1929. A bill authorizing funding for the bridge was ultimately passed in 1933.
