= Skagit Bay =

Bay and strait within Puget Sound, Washington, United States

Coordinates: 48°18′0″N 122°26′50″W

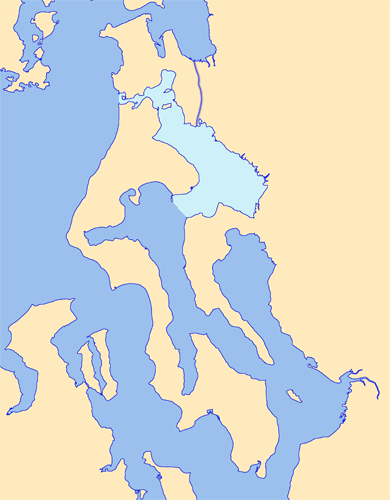
Location of Skagit Bay

Skagit Bay is a bay and strait located in the U.S. state of Washington. It is part of the Whidbey Island Basin of Puget Sound. The Skagit River empties into Skagit Bay. To the south, Skagit Bay connects with the rest of Puget Sound via Saratoga Passage and Possession Sound. The boundary between Saratoga Passage and Skagit Bay is between Polnell Point on Whidbey Island and Rocky Point on Camano Island. To the northwest, Skagit Bay connects to the Strait of Juan de Fuca via the narrow strait of Deception Pass. A third waterway, the Swinomish Channel, connects Skagit Bay with Padilla Bay to the north.

Skagit Bay is bounded by Whidbey Island to the west, Fidalgo Island to the north, Camano Island to the south, and the mainland to the east. The mainland coast consists almost entirely of the Skagit River delta, including Fir Island, between the North Fork and South Fork distributaries of the Skagit River.

The northern end of Skagit Bay is called Similk Bay. Two islands at the northern end, Hope and Skagit islands, have been designated as marine state parks. The Swinomish Indian Reservation is located on Fidalgo Island at the north end of Skagit Bay, between Similk Bay and the Swinomish Channel.

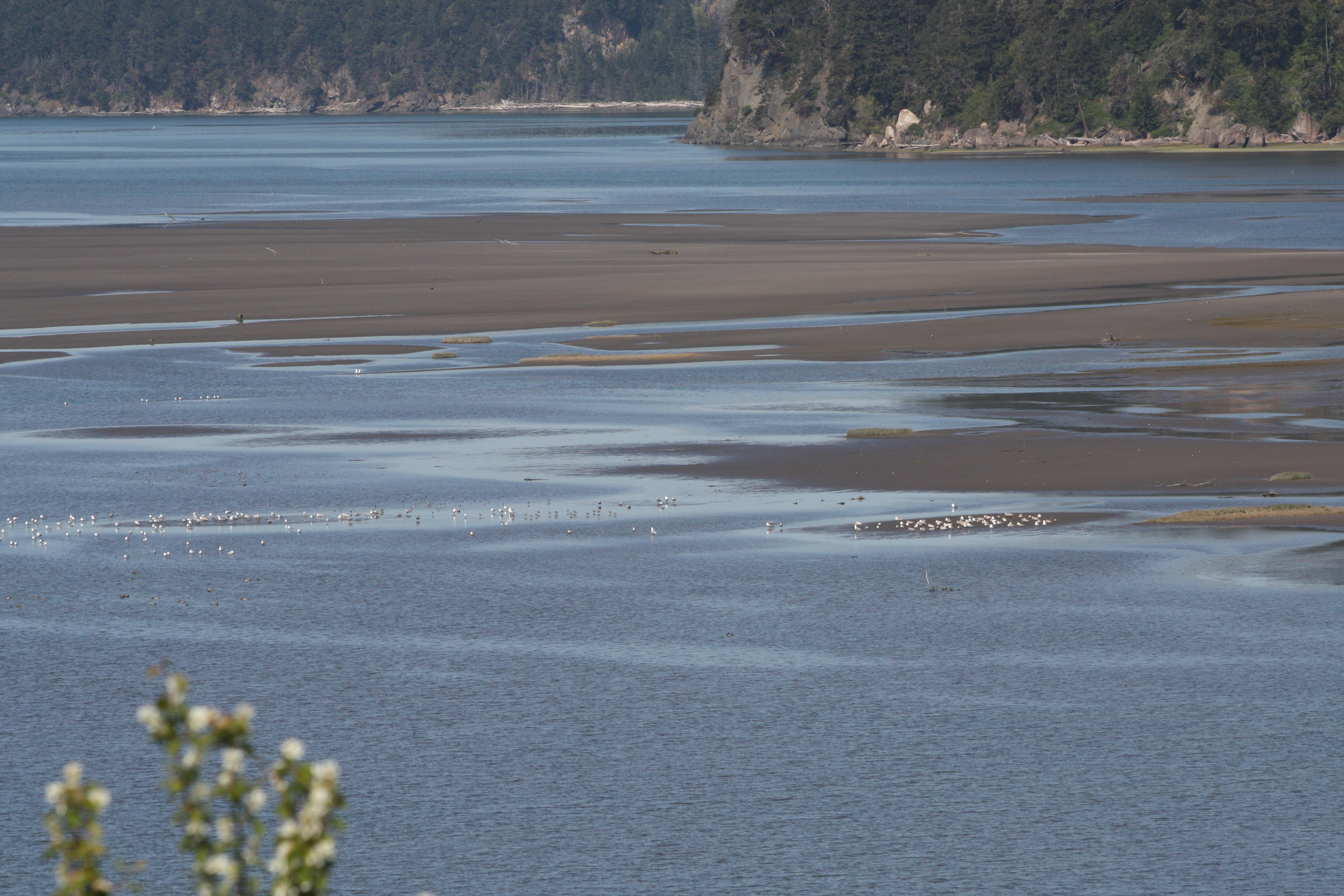
Skagit Bay mudflats with Goat and Ika Islands

== History ==
The bay is in an area occupied for thousands of years by various cultures of indigenous peoples. They made use of the bay to gather fish and shellfish, integral to their diets.

Members of the 1792 Vancouver Expedition were the first non-indigenous people recorded as having come upon and explored Skagit Bay. On May 30, 1792, Joseph Whidbey led a boat survey team up Saratoga Passage and into Skagit Bay. They spent a day surveying but did not see Deception Pass, and concluded that Skagit Bay was closed.

The next day George Vancouver noted the swampy waterway connecting Port Susan to Skagit Bay at the north end of Camano Island. Later, on June 7, Vancouver's ships passed by Deception Pass from the west. Peter Puget and Joseph Whidbey took boats to investigate the opening and found it connected to Skagit Bay, thus they realized the land (to be known as Whidbey Island) comprised an island rather than a peninsula.
