= Hope Island State Park (Skagit County, Washington) =

Washington marine state park

Hope Island Marine State Park - Skagit County
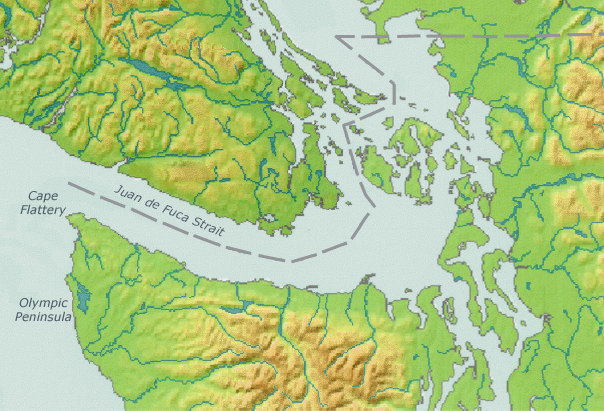
- Location within Strait of Juan de Fuca Location within Washington (state) Location within the United States
- Location: Skagit County, Washington, United States
- Coordinates: 48°24′00″N 122°34′03″W
- Area: 200 acres (81 ha)
- Elevation: 157 ft (48 m)
- Administrator: Washington State Parks and Recreation Commission
- Website: Official website

Hope Island State Park - Skagit County is a 200-acre (81 ha) marine state park located on Hope Island at the northern end of Skagit Bay in Skagit County, Washington. The island has primitive campsites, beaches and forest with occasional meadows and rock outcroppings. Five mooring buoys are found on the island's northern flank. Herons nest on the southwestern end of the island. Most of the island is a Natural Area Preserve and closed to recreational use, including hiking and camping.
