= Fidalgo Island =

Island in the Salish Sea, northwest Washington, United States

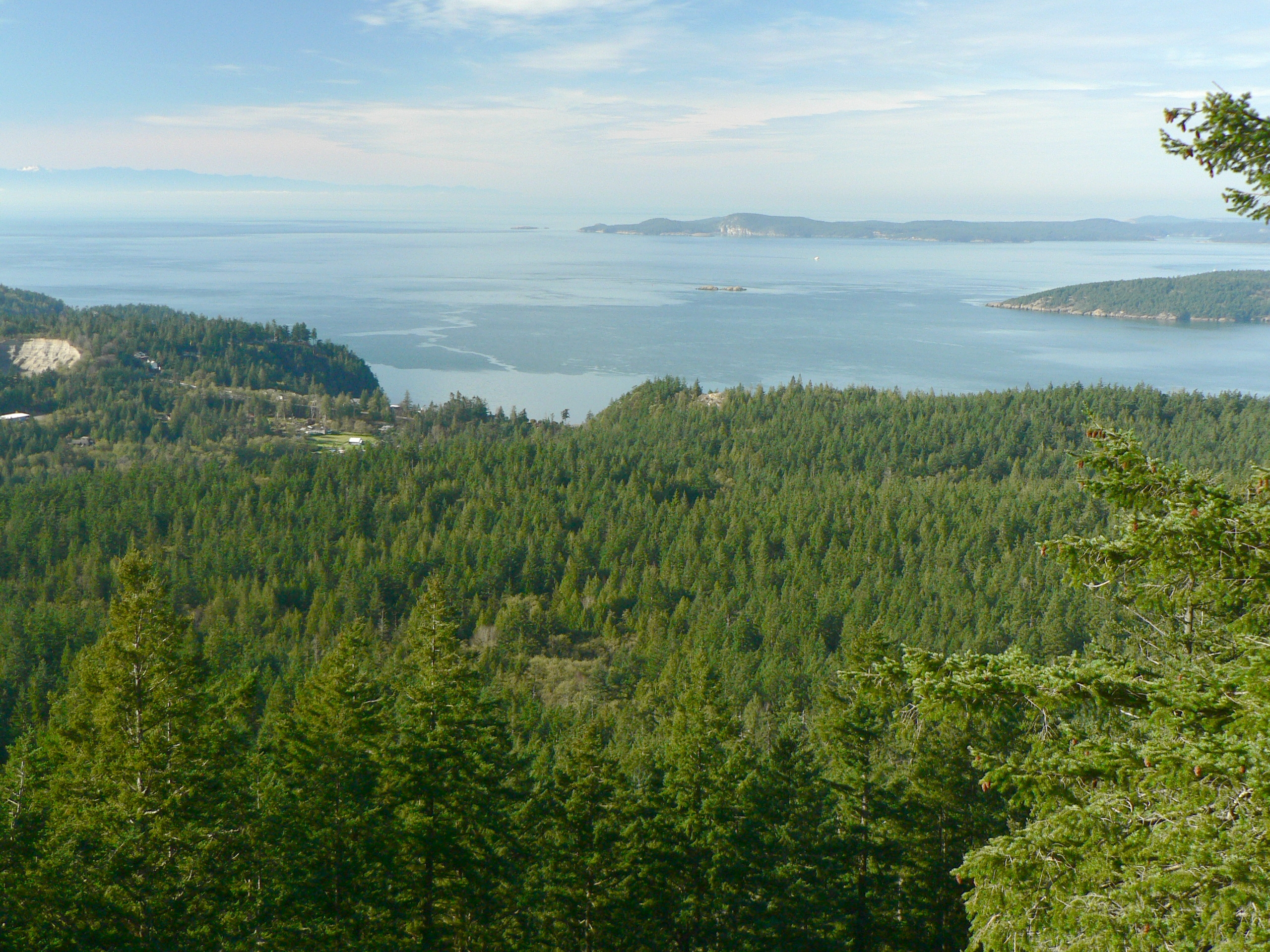
- The forested western slopes of Fidalgo Island overlook the Strait of Juan de Fuca.

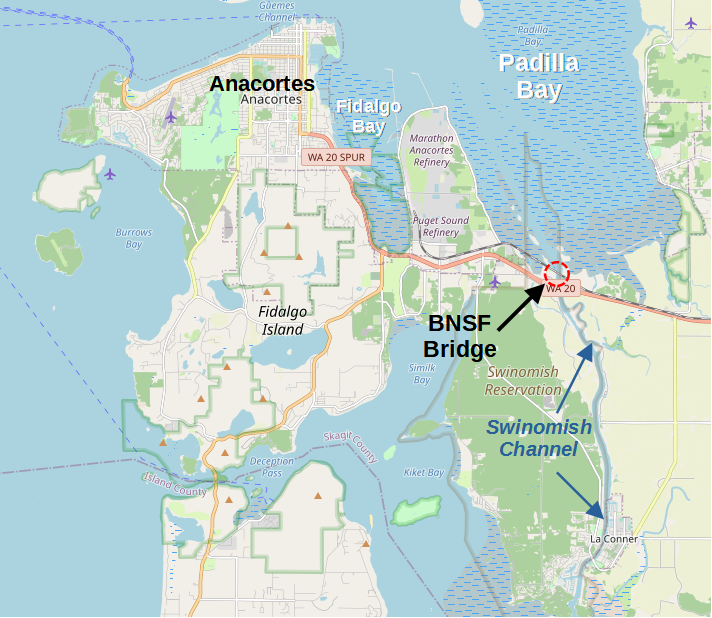
- Map of Fidalgo Island

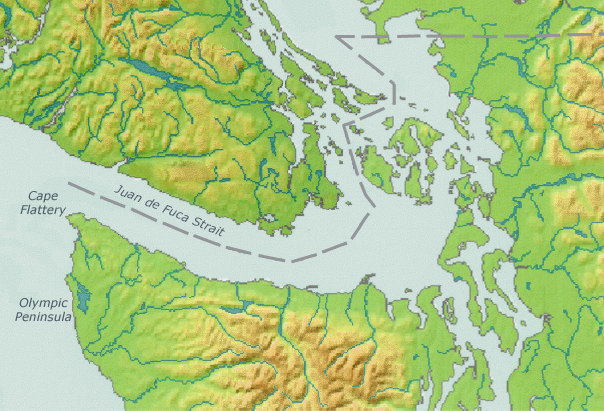
- Location within Strait of Juan de Fuca Location within Washington (state)
- Etymology: Salvador Fidalgo

Geography
- Location: Pacific Northwest
- Coordinates: 48°27′44″N 122°37′43″W

Administration
- United States
- State: Washington
- County: Skagit
- Largest settlement: Anacortes (pop. 17,637)

Fidalgo Island is an island in Skagit County, Washington, located about 60 mi (97 km) north of Seattle. To the east, it is separated from the mainland by the Swinomish Channel, and from Whidbey Island to the south by Deception Pass. The island is named after the Spanish explorer and cartographer Salvador Fidalgo, who explored the area in 1790.

Its largest and only city is Anacortes with a population of 17,637 at the time of the 2020 census. Anacortes has ferries with daily service to the San Juan Islands and Guemes Island.

== Geography ==
Fidalgo Island has a land area of 106.684 km² (41.19 sq mi). There are at least eight major lakes on Fidalgo Island which are named Campbell, Erie, Heart, Little Cranberry, Mud, Pass, Trafton/Crater, and Whistle.

== History ==
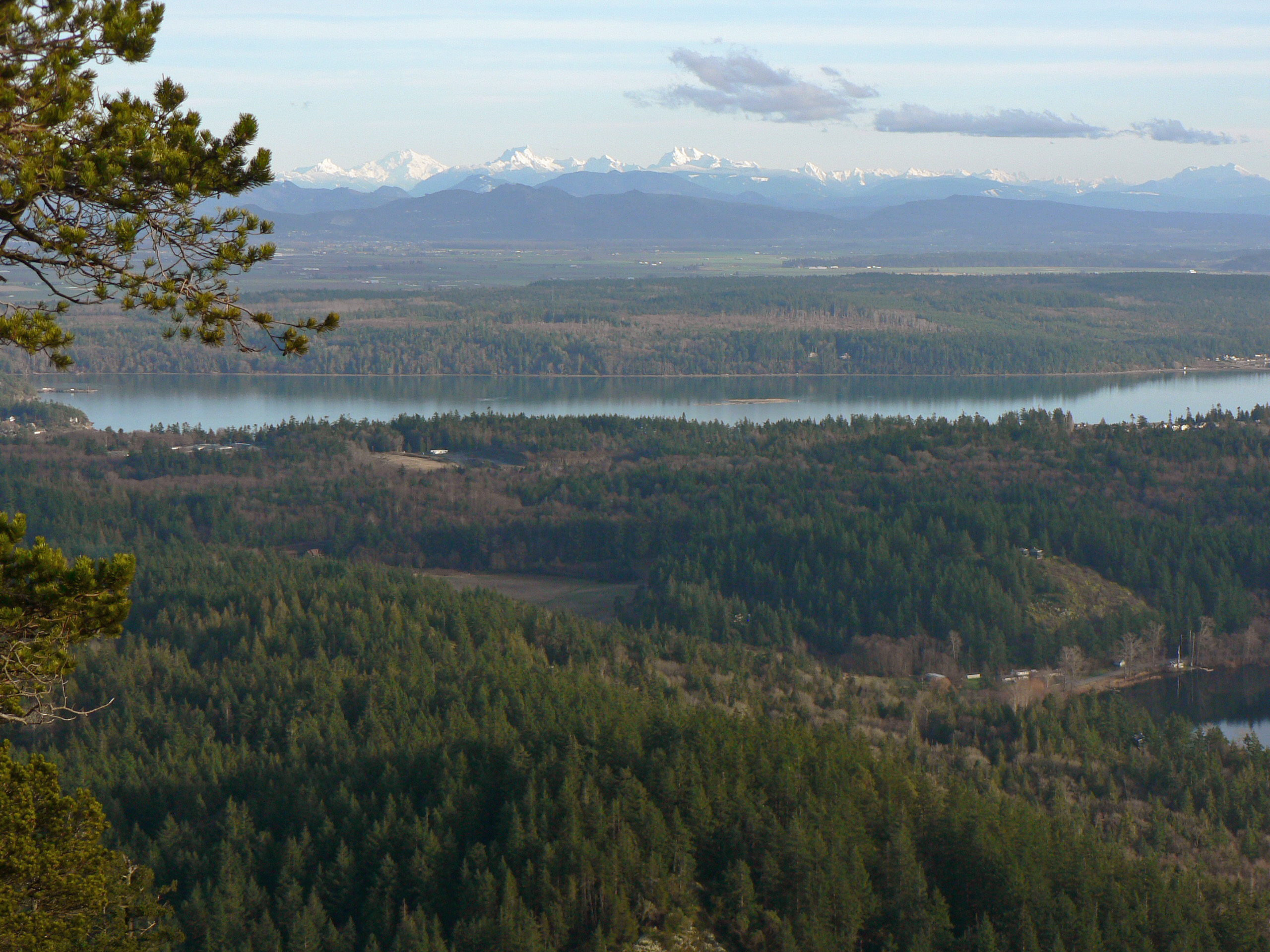
Southeastern Fidalgo Island with Lake Campbell (lower right) and Swinomish Indian Reservation just beyond Similk Bay (middle)

At the time of European contact, Fidalgo Island was inhabited by the Samish and Swinomish peoples. The Samish Indian Nation maintains a presence in the area, with an administrative office in Anacortes.

Fidalgo Island is named for the Spanish explorer and cartographer Salvador Fidalgo who explored the area in 1790 with the fleet of Francisco de Eliza. Charles Wilkes discovered that it was an island rather than part of the mainland. He named it Perry Island in honor of Oliver Hazard Perry, the American commander who won the Battle of Lake Erie during the War of 1812. Following this theme, Wilkes named the island's highest point Mount Erie. When Henry Kellett reorganized the official British Admiralty charts in 1847, he removed Wilkes' name Perry and bestowed the name Fidalgo to honor the Spanish explorer. The highest point retained the name Erie.

Settlement peaked in the 1850s due to the Fraser River Gold Rush and in 1890 due to speculation that the area would become a terminus of the Northern Pacific Railroad. Later the island became an important fishing and lumber center.

== Transportation ==
From 1924 to 1935, Fidalgo Island was linked to Whidbey Island by the Deception Pass ferry, which was superseded in 1935 by the completion of the Deception Pass Bridge. Today, Fidalgo Island is the site of the ferry terminal that links Anacortes to Vancouver Island and the San Juan Islands to the rest of the state. Seasonal ferry service from Anacortes to Sidney, British Columbia was canceled in 2020 due to the COVID-19 pandemic; it was later announced that ferry service to Sidney would not return until 2030 at the earliest.

== Notable residents ==
- Morris Graves, painter
- Phil Elverum, musician
- Burl Ives, actor, singer, voice personality
- Jake Anderson, fisherman and reality TV star

== See also ==
- List of islands of Washington (state)
