= Lummi =

Lummi most commonly refers to:

== Lummi people ==
- Lummi people, a Coast Salish people located in western Washington state
  - Lummi Nation, a federally-recognized tribe primarily composed of Lummis
  - Lummi dialect, the dialect of North Straits Salish spoken by the Lummi

== Geography ==
- Lummi Island, an island in the U.S. state of Washington
- Lummi River, a channel at the mouth of the Nooksack River in the U.S. state of Washington

== Music ==
- Lummi stick
