= Coal pier =

Facility for transferring coal between rail and ship

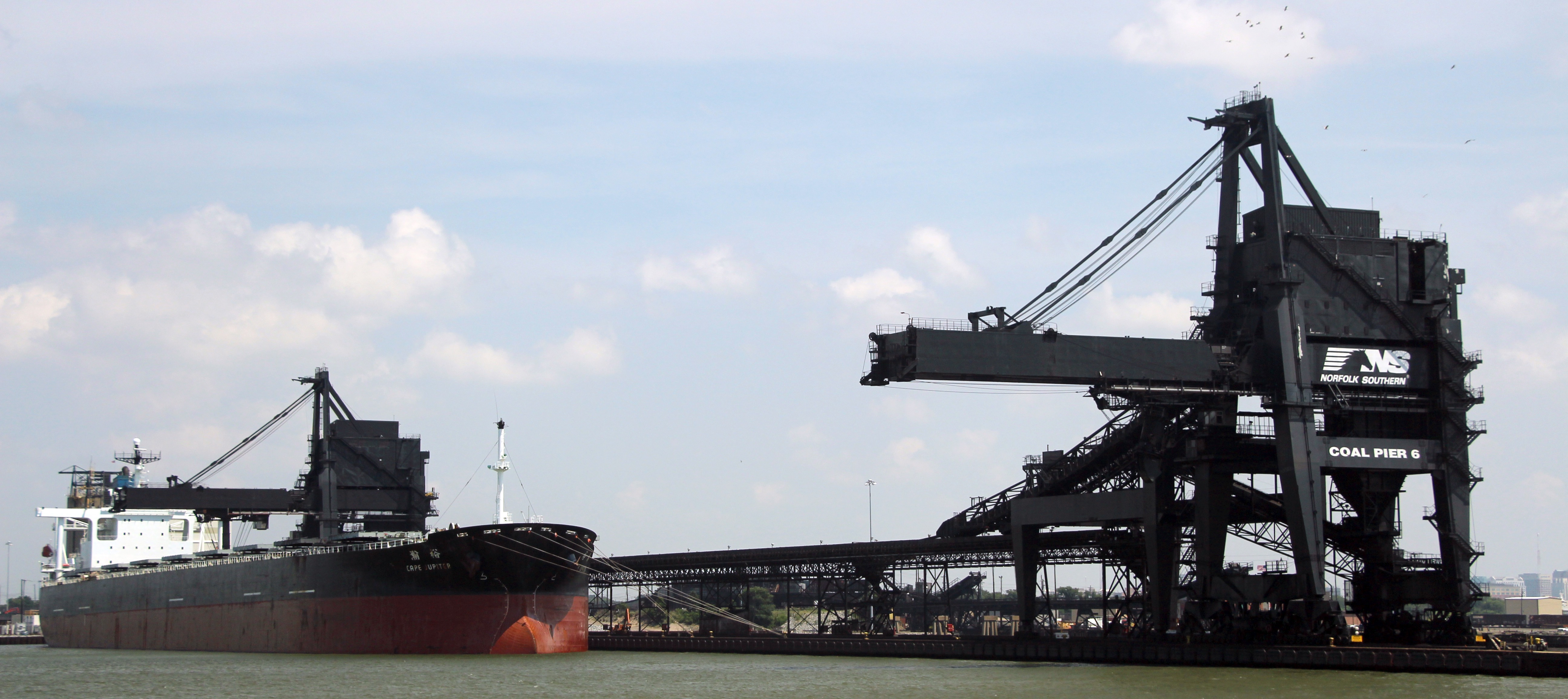
Lambert's Point pier

A coal pier is a transloading facility designed for the transfer of coal between rail and ship.

The typical facility for loading ships consists of a holding area and a system of conveyors for transferring the coal to dockside and loading it into the ship's cargo holds. Originally the holding area consisted of a rail yard in which the loaded cars were sorted by grade and held until needed for loading. Modern facilities are more likely to unload the cars immediately (for example, with rotary car dumpers) and store the coal in piles until the ship is loaded. This frees up the cars for immediate reuse and obviates rail yard maintenance.

Dedicated coal piers began to be constructed in the 1880s at ports on the Atlantic Coast and Great Lakes in the United States, and many of these survive (though highly modified) to the present. In Virginia, beginning in 1881, coal piers, operated by the Chesapeake and Ohio Railway (C&O) on the Virginia Peninsula at Newport News and in South Hampton Roads by the Norfolk and Western (N&W) and Virginian Railway (VGN) at Norfolk, made the port of Hampton Roads the largest shipping point of coal in the world by 1930. The Curtis Bay coal terminal in Baltimore, Maryland, built by the Baltimore and Ohio Railroad (B&O) in the 1880s, was for a time the largest such facility in the world. C&O and B&O also had facilities on Lake Erie.

In modern times, CSX Transportation continues to serve coal piers at Newport News and Curtis Bay, and Norfolk Southern operates a large complex at Lambert's Point in Norfolk.

== Pacific Northwest ==
In the Pacific Northwest of the United States, a number of coal terminals such as the Gateway Pacific Terminal in Bellingham, Washington, were proposed for export of coal from the Powder River Basin to China. As of May 2013, three projects remained under consideration.

Lighthouse Resources (formerly Ambre Energy) of Salt Lake City dropped their Morrow Pacific project proposed for Boardman, Oregon, in May, 2016.

The US Army Corps of Engineers sided with the Lummi nation in denying a permit for the Gateway Pacific Terminal in May, 2016. The developers withdrew their application in 2017.

Millennium Bulk Terminals proposed for Longview, Washington, lost a permit appeal in March 2020. As of October, 2020, the state of Montana is suing the state of Washington over the denial.
