= Lummi Nation =

Federally-recognized tribe in Washington (state)

Lummi Tribe of the Lummi Reservation Xwlemi
- Federally recognized tribe, Indian reservation
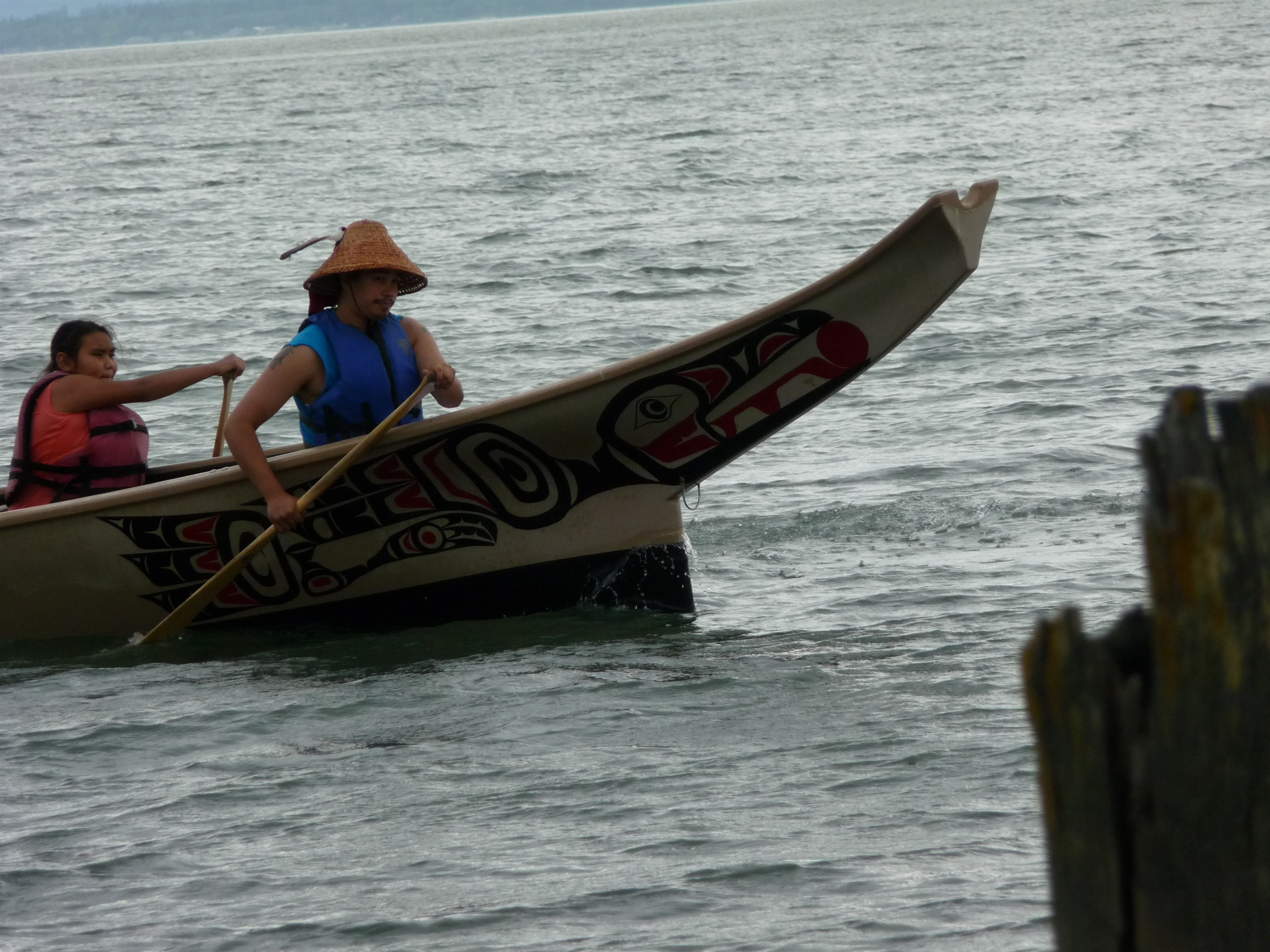
- Tribal citizen operating canoe in Lummi territorial waters in 2008

- Seal
- Nickname: Lummi Nation
- Location in Whatcom County and the state of Washington
- Country: United States
- Reservation established: 1855
- Constitution written: 1970

Government
  - Chairman: Anthony Hillaire
  - Vice Chairman: Terrance Adams
  - Treasurer: Rosalee Revey-Jacobs
  - Secretary: Cheryl Sanders

Population (2010)
  - Total: 4,483
- Demonym(s): Lhaq'temish, Xwlemi
- Time zone: UTC–8 (Pacific (PST))
  - Summer (DST): UTC–7 (PDT)
- Area codes: 360, 564
- Website: lummi-nsn.gov

The Lummi Nation (/ˈlʌmi/ LUH-mee; Lummi: Xwlemi [xʷləˈmi] or Lhaq'temish; officially the Lummi Tribe of the Lummi Reservation) is a federally recognized tribe of primarily Lummi people located in western Washington. The Lummi Nation also includes some Nooksack, Samish, and other local tribes, which were removed to the reservation in Whatcom County.

== History ==
=== Precontact era ===
The Lummi originally inhabited many settlements on the San Juan Islands. However, due to high amounts of raiding from northern peoples and disease, they migrated to the mainland, settling around the lower Nooksack River. They displaced or assimilated the people living there at the time, the Skalakhan and Hulwhaluq. The villages that they occupied on the mainland were fortified with large stockades, which they used to defend themselves from the northern raiders.

Lummi territory and villages c. 1850

=== 19th-century: Treaty of Point Elliott ===
In 1855, the predecessor tribes of the Lummi Nation (including the Lummi people) were signatory to the Treaty of Point Elliott, which was signed at modern-day Mukilteo. Chowitsoot, one of the Lummi leaders at the time, signed the treaty for the Lummi "and other tribes". 13 additional people signed the treaty for the Lummi. The treaty demanded that the Lummi cede the title to their lands, and in return, the 12,562.94 acre Lummi Reservation was established near the mouth of the Nooksack River, on the Lummi Peninsula.

Lummi signatories to the Treaty of Point Elliott

- Chowitshoot
- Sehlekqu
- S'h'chehoos (a.k.a. "General Washington")
- Whailanhu (a.k.a. "Davy Crockett")
- Sheahdelthu
- Kwultseh
- Kwullethu
- Hwnlahlakq (a.k.a. "Thomas Jefferson")
- Chtsimpt
- Tsesumten
- Klthahlten
- Kuttakanam (a.k.a. "John")
- S'hoolkkanam
- Chloksuts

On November 22, 1873, the Lummi Reservation was enlarged to 13,600 acres.

=== 20th century ===
In 1897, the case United States v. Alaska Packers' Association disallowed the Lummi on the reservation from removing non-Native fishermen in their fisheries. Following this, much of the recent history of the Lummi Nation has been marked by a struggle to regain their fishing rights. Following steady increases in the number of individuals and firms fishing in areas traditionally fished by the Lummi, the nation fought for and gained limited protection under the law for the right to fish in their traditional manner. The Lummi Nation was part of the broader fight for fishing and treaty rights, which came to a head in 1974 with United States v. Washington (commonly known as the Boldt Decision).

In 1970, the Lummi Nation adopted a new constitution which gave the Business Council broader powers.

=== 21st century ===
Since the late 20th century, the Lummi Nation has worked to revive elements of its traditional culture. From July 30 to August 4, 2007, the Lummi Nation hosted its first potlatch since the 1930s as part of the Tribal Canoe Journeys Paddle to Lummi. During the event, 68 families paddled handmade canoes to the Lummi Reservation from parts of Washington and British Columbia.

In 2017, the Lummi Nation declared a state of emergency in the aftermath of the 2017 Cypress Island Atlantic salmon pen break. They recaptured most of the recovered non-native, farmed Atlantic salmon. The Lummi and other parties interested in the fisheries of the Northwest were very worried about Atlantic salmon interfering with those of the Pacific waters and rivers.

In 2024, a nonprofit led by a Lummi Nation elder acquired over 2 acres of land just north of Madrona Point on Orcas Island. The organization intends to restore the land to the Lummi Nation. The newly acquired land, situated next to Madrona Point, adds to the Lummi Nation's existing holdings of over 24 acres. Madrona Point is a sacred area held in trust by the United States. It, along with the recent acquisition, is part of the ancestral village of Ts’elxwisen’, which historically covered what is now Eastsound.

==== Gateway Pacific Terminal ====
The Gateway Pacific Terminal was a proposed coal export terminal at Xwe’chi’eXen (Cherry Point) in Whatcom County, along the Salish Sea shoreline. The Lummi opposed the project because of potential adverse environmental impact on their treaty fishing rights and their sacred sites. It did not win approval.

== Lummi Reservation ==
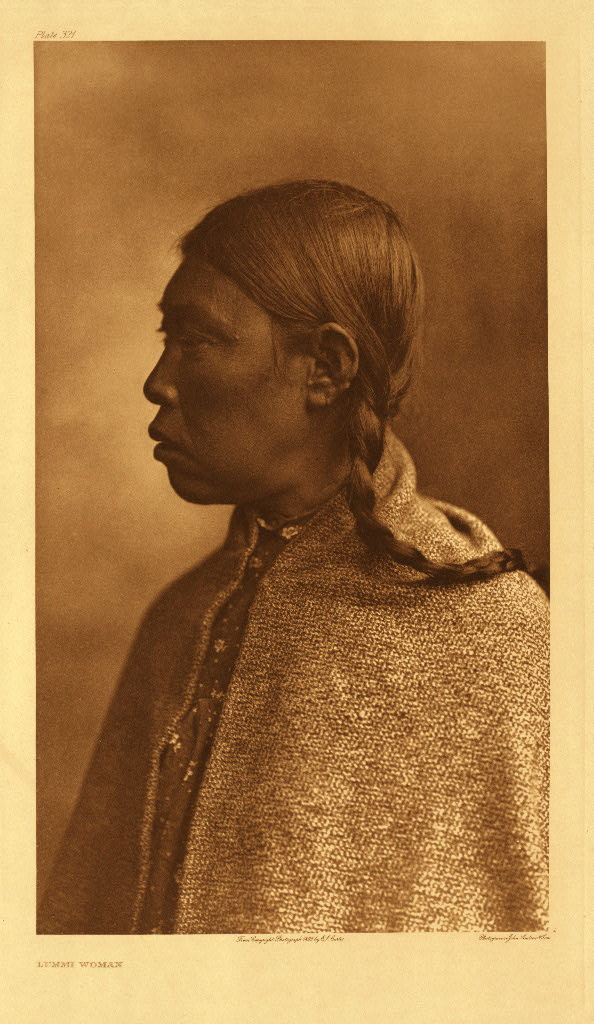
Lummi woman, c. 1907–1930, photograph by Edward S. Curtis

The Lummi Reservation is the Indian reservation of the Lummi Nation. Established in 1855, it was intended to serve as the reservation for the Lummi, Nooksack, and Samish peoples, as well as several other local peoples. Originally, the reservation was 12,562.94 acres, however it was enlarged to 13,600 acres in 1877.

An estimated 6,590 people live on the Lummi Reservation. Roughly 2,564 are enrolled Lummi citizens, and 665 are either related to or live with an enrolled tribal member. Some 3,361 are neither tribal members nor affiliated with any member of the Lummi Nation. The 2000 United States Census recorded 4,193 persons residing on the reservation, of whom 1,828 (43.6 percent) identified as White, and 2,114 (50.4 percent) identified as being of only Native American ancestry.

There are approximately 1,864 homes located on the reservation. Approximately 697 of these have an enrolled Lummi living in the home; thus, roughly 1,167 homes on the reservation do not house a tribal member.

== Demographics ==
As of April 2010 there are 4,483 enrolled tribal members. 49.6% are female and 50.4% are male. The median age of tribal members is 29. Nearly one-third of the members, some 31.8%, are 18 years or younger. 11.6% are 55 or older. According to studies conducted by the Lummi Nation either on or near the reservation boundaries, enrolled Lummi tribal members have an average household size of approximately 4.5 people.

== Economy ==
=== Fishing and aquaculture ===
The Lummi Nation owns a large oyster farm, which is the third largest on the west coast of the United States. They also have large aquaculture facilities on their reservation.

In 1970, the Lummi Business Council created the Aquacultural Project to harvest food from their waters. By the 1980s, they operated the largest salmon fleet on Puget Sound, with approximately 600 gillnet boats and 40 seiners.

Throughout the 1990s, salmon runs were highly diminished, and in 2001, the fishing season was a "complete failure". Later that year, the Lummi Business Council declared the Lummi Nation an "Economic Fisheries Disaster Area" and created programs to try to retrain idle fishermen. By 2003, their fishing industry had collapsed, and the Lummi fleet was reduced to between 150 and 200 gillnet boats and 3 or 4 seiners.

=== Tribal gambling ===
They were among the first tribes to open an Indian casino in Washington after the U.S. Congress passed the Indian Gaming Regulatory Act of 1988. The tribe opened the Lummi Casino in 1992 and was the second largest employer in Whatcom County, with 450 employees. However, it closed in 1997 after traffic from Canada had declined.

A new casino, the Silver Reef Casino Resort, opened in 2002, close to Interstate 5. It was the target of an $11-million expansion in 2003, which built a steakhouse, terrace, cocktail bar, and a 400-seat pavilion for events.

=== Employment ===
A recent collaborative study conducted by the Lummi Nation and Northern Economics Inc. found the following about the Lummi Nation workforce. 28% of the adult population (ages 18–64) is employed. The labor workforce participation rate is 25%. The Lummi unemployment rate of about 75% is estimated to be three times the local average. The median monthly income for employed Lummi tribal members is approximately $1,200.

== Government and politics ==
The Lummi Tribe of the Lummi Reservation ratified a constitution and bylaws in 1970, which they amended in 2006. The tribe is governed by the Lummi Indian Business Council, an elected 11-member council, on which members serve three-year terms. The council selects executive officers for their duties, including chair, vice-chair, treasurer, and secretary, and establishes committees for administration of the tribe. As of May 2025, Business Council is as follows:

- Chairman: Anthony Hillaire
- Vice Chairman: Terrance Adams
- Treasurer: Rosalee Revey-Jacobs
- Secretary: Cheryl Sanders
- Council Member: Maureen Kinley
- Council Member: G.I. James
- Council Member: Vendean (Jim) Washington
- Council Member: Karley Kinley
- Council Member: Cliff Cultee
- Council Member: Lisa Wilson
- Council Member: Dana Wilson

== Culture ==
For the past century, the Lummi Nation has been attempting to preserve and revitalize their traditional culture. The first Lummi potlatch since 1937 was hosted in 2007.

For the Lummi nation, canoes are a large part of their culture. Each year in June, the Lummi Nation hosts the Lummi Stommish Water Carnival, which features large canoe race, as well as having dancing and traditional gambling games. Tribes from Washington and British Columbia compete in war canoes measuring up to fifty feet. The event was established by Lummi veterans of World War I, who wished to honor tribal citizens in World War II. Today, the carnival is put on in honor of Lummi veterans of all wars.

=== Languages ===
The Lummi language (Xwlemi Chosen, IPA: [xʷləmi tʃɔsən]) is a dialect of the North Straits Salish language, part of the larger Salishan language family.

== Infrastructure ==
The Lummi Nation operates the Portage Bay Construction company, which builds homes in the Ferndale and Bellingham Areas, and they have been operating a home-improvement program since 1969.

=== Healthcare ===
The Lummi Nation operates a healthcare facility in Bellingham where they offer both medical and dental care, as well as substance abuse counseling.

== Education ==
The Lummi Nation has been working to increase the education levels among their youth. Among enrolled Lummis aged 25–64: 15.1% do not have a high school diploma or a GED; 33.8% have either a high school or GED degree; 27.1% have some college experience; 14.9% have a two-year (AA or AS) degree; 7.5% have a bachelor's degree; and 1.6% have a graduate or professional degree.

The tribe operates several schools and education programmes. They have Head Start and daycare centers for children. While most education for Lummi children is provided by the Ferndale School District, the Lummi Nation also operates the Lummi Nation School (LNS), a K–12 school that opened in 2004. Four years later, they added the Lummi Youth Academy, a boarding school available for grades 9 through 12. The academy is focused on strengthening Lummi culture, and offers social programs to at-risk teenagers.

The tribe founded the Lummi Indian School of Aquaculture in 1973 as a means of training tribal members in fishing and shellfish hatcheries. Later, the school was refounded into Northwest Indian College, the only accredited tribal college in Washington, Oregon, and Idaho.

== See also ==
- Lummi stick, percussion instrument whose name is borrowed from the tribal name.
- Northwest Indian College
