= Gateway Pacific Terminal =

Coordinates: 48°51′48″N 122°44′26″W

Proposed location of the Gateway Pacific Terminal

The Gateway Pacific Terminal was a proposed export terminal at Cherry Point (Lummi: Xwe’chi’eXen) in Whatcom County, Washington, along the Salish Sea shoreline. It was announced in 2011 and would have exported coal, but was opposed by local residents and the Lummi Nation, who had an ancestral village site at Cherry Point. The terminal project was rejected by the U.S. Army Corps of Engineers in 2016, ruling that it would infringe on the fishing rights of the Lummi Nation.

== Review process and jurisdiction ==
On February 28, 2011, the environmental review process for the Gateway Pacific Terminal commenced when SSA Marine applied for state and federal permits to build the $500 million project. On the federal level, the Army Corps of Engineers is in charge of the environmental review process, and ultimately, the fate of the project.

== Proposal ==
The proposed terminal would have primarily exported coal, and if constructed would be the largest coal export terminal in North America. The Gateway Pacific Terminal would include a 2,980-foot dock and allow up to 487 ships per year to berth.

== Opposition ==
The scale of the project resulted in protests by the Lummi Nation and other concerned parties in opposition to the construction of the terminal. The Lummi Nation argues that the construction of the Gateway Pacific Terminal violates their treaty rights under the 1855 Treaty of Point Elliot, which under Article 5 grants signatory nations "The right of taking fish at usual and accustomed grounds and stations is further secured to said Indians in common with all citizens of the Territory." Further, they argue the presence of the terminal could "irrevocably damage religious and sacred sites, such as Cherry Point, if the coal should spill." Previous requests for permits in the area, including for a proposed salmon fishery, have been rejected on similar grounds.

On June 1, 2011, more than 300 persons turned out for a hearing regarding the Gateway Pacific Terminal hosted by Mayor Dan Pike of nearby Bellingham, Washington. Many of the speakers opposed the terminal, citing varied concerns, including "health effects from coal dust and ship and locomotive emissions, climate change from the burning of exported coal in China, and reduced property values from railroad dirt and noise." Supporters of the project also spoke, with primarily members of local labor unions speaking in support because of potential employment opportunities. David Warren, a former president of the Whatcom County Labor Council, stated, "We've lost 3,500 to 4,000 jobs in the last several years in this area ... you can't say you're for jobs if you are against the industries that provide them."

On June 3, 2011, in the aftermath of the June 1 meeting, Mayor Pike announced his opposition to the Gateway Pacific Terminal project, stating "At this point, I don't think this community wants to see any coal, and I'm kind of with them on that," and critiqued the concerns over employment opportunities, stating "We cannot turn our backs on people who are struggling in this community, but that doesn't mean we take jobs at any cost."

In May, 2012, the Seattle City Council unanimously passed a resolution in opposition to the development of coal export ports in the region. This followed the passage of resolutions in opposition by smaller municipalities regionally, including Hood River, Oregon, and Camas, Washougal, and Marysville, in Washington.

In October 2012, a group of Native and non-Native fishermen gathered a fleet of boats in the waters around Xwe’chi’eXen to stand with the Lummi Nation in opposition. This action was supported by the leadership of the Lummi Nation, with Lummi Nation Chairman Cliff Cultee stating "We have to say ‘no’ to the coal terminal project ... it is our Xw’ xalh Xechnging (sacred duty) to preserve and protect all of Xwe’chi’eXen." Again, in October 2012, tribal leaders burned a mock million dollar to signify that they could not be bought out.

A December 2014 study by the Washington State Department of Ecology stated that the construction of the Gateway Pacific Terminal would cause an increase in potential oil spills, leading to environmental damage and disruption of traditional fishing grounds. The median amount of oil spills in the nearby Puget Sound is projected by the study to increase 26 percent, or an increase from approximately 10 to approximately 13 individual spills a year by 2019. The quantity of oil spilled in the area would increase 28 percent, from 656 gallons to 857 gallons.

On January 5, 2015, the Lummi Indian Business Council and the Lummi Nation sent a formal letter to the Army Corps of Engineer requesting a denial of the permit. The letter, signed by members of the Council and Chair Tim Ballew II, states "The proposed project will directly result in the substantial impairment of the treaty rights of the Lummi Nation throughout the Nations’ "usual and accustomed" fishing areas... The Lummi have harvested at this location since time immemorial and plan to continue into the future. The proposed project will impact this significant treaty harvesting location and will significantly limit the ability of tribal members to exercise their treaty rights... The devastating environmental impacts associated with this project, as well as the trust responsibility of federal agencies to ensure the protection of the treaty rights of the Lummi Nation, mandate the denial of any and all permits under the Corp's jurisdiction."

On August 27, 2015, the Lummi Indian Business Council and the Lummi Nation sent a letter to the Army Corps of Engineers requesting an expedited decision on the status of the Gateway Pacific Terminal, stating "We remain committed to assisting the Corps in evaluating our request for a permit denial. However, we are not interested in engaging in a lengthy dialogue with the project proponent and do not anticipate the necessity of responding further." Additionally, the Lummi Nation announced on the same date that they were hiring Dentons, the world's largest law firm, to represent them in future lawsuits, indicating the Lummi are preparing for a fight in the courts over the Gateway Pacific Terminal.

These protests by the Lummi and others regarding the Gateway Pacific Terminal connect to regional struggles against fossil coal extraction and export by environmental groups and Native American organizations in the Pacific Northwest. In September 2012, the Affiliated Tribes of Northwest Indians, a congress of more than 50 tribes in seven states, passed a resolution demanding a broad environmental impact statement for all terminal projects regionally. Another regional protest against coal development in the Pacific Northwest by Native American groups was the Totem Pole Journey, the journey of a 22-foot totem pole through the region from Vancouver, British Columbia to Lame Deer, Montana. On August 21, 2015, the pole made a stop in Bellingham, Washington, for a blessing by the Lummi Nation at the Tribal Administration Center.

== Proposal rejected ==
On May 9, 2016, the Army Corps of Engineers denied a permit to the project, citing the Lummi Nation's treaty-protected fishing rights.

In July 2021, Whatcom County passed a zoning ordinance to prohibit new refineries, fossil fuel shipment facilities, coal plants, piers, and wharfs, in an attempt to put a permanent end to such proposals.
