= List of casinos in Washington =

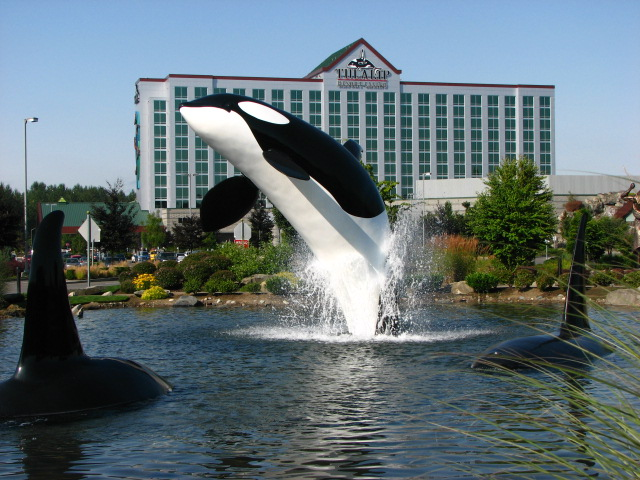
Tulalip Resort Casino

This is a list of casinos in Washington.

Quil Ceda Creek Casino

Angel of the Winds

== List of casinos ==
List of casinos in the U.S. state of Washington
Casino	City	County	State	District	Type	Comments
12 Tribes Coulee Dam Casino	Coulee Dam	Okanogan	Washington		Native American	Owned by the Confederated Tribes of the Colville Reservation
12 Tribes Lake Chelan Casino	Manson	Chelan	Washington		Native American	Owned by the Confederated Tribes of the Colville Reservation
12 Tribes Omak Casino Hotel	Omak	Okanogan	Washington		Native American	Owned by the Confederated Tribes of the Colville Reservation
7 Cedars Casino	Sequim	Clallam	Washington		Native American	Owned by the Jamestown S'Klallam Tribe
Angel of the Winds Casino Resort	Arlington	Snohomish	Washington		Native American	Owned by the Stillaguamish Tribe of Indians
BJ's Bingo & Gaming	Fife	Pierce	Washington		Native American	Owned by the Puyallup Tribe of Indians; no table games
Mistequa Casino Hotel	Chewelah	Stevens	Washington		Native American	Owned by the Spokane Tribe of Indians
Elwha River Casino	Port Angeles	Clallam	Washington		Native American	Owned by the Lower Elwha Klallam Tribe
Emerald Queen Hotel & Casino Fife	Fife	Pierce	Washington		Native American	Owned by the Puyallup Tribe of Indians
Emerald Queen Hotel & Casino Tacoma	Tacoma	Pierce	Washington		Native American	Owned by the Puyallup Tribe of Indians
Ilani Casino Resort	La Center	Clark	Washington		Native American	Owned by the Cowlitz Indian Tribe
Legends Casino Hotel	Toppenish	Yakima	Washington		Native American	Owned by the Yakama Indian Reservation
Little Creek Casino and Resort	Shelton	Mason	Washington		Native American	Owned by the Squaxin Island Tribe
Lucky Dog Casino	Potlatch	Mason	Washington		Native American	Owned by the Skokomish Indian Tribe
Lucky Eagle Casino & Hotel	Rochester	Thurston	Washington		Native American	Owned by the Confederated Tribes of the Chehalis Reservation
Muckleshoot Indian Casino	Auburn	King	Washington		Native American	Owned by the Muckleshoot Indian Tribe
Nisqually Red Wind Casino	Yelm	Thurston	Washington		Native American	Owned by the Nisqually Indian Tribe
Nooksack Northwood Casino	Lynden	Whatcom	Washington		Native American	Owned by the Nooksack Indian Tribe
Northern Quest Casino	Airway Heights	Spokane	Washington		Native American	Owned by the Kalispel Tribe of Indians
Quinault Beach Resort and Casino	Ocean Shores	Grays Harbor	Washington		Native American	Owned by the Quinault Indian Nation
Shoalwater Bay Casino	Tokeland	Pacific	Washington		Native American	Owned by the Shoalwater Bay Tribe
Silver Reef Casino Resort	Ferndale	Whatcom	Washington		Native American	Owned by the Lummi Nation
Skagit Casino Resort	Bow	Skagit	Washington		Native American	Owned by the Upper Skagit Indian Tribe; formally Harrah's Skagit Casino
Snoqualmie Casino	Snoqualmie	King	Washington		Native American	Owned by the Snoqualmie Indian Tribe
Spokane Tribe Resort & Casino	Airway Heights	Spokane	Washington		Native American	Owned by the Spokane Tribe of Indians
Suquamish Clearwater Casino Resort	Suqamish	Kitsap	Washington		Native American	Owned by the Suquamish Tribe
Swinomish Northern Lights Casino	Anacortes	Skagit	Washington		Native American	Owned by the Swinomish Indian Tribal Community
The Point Casino	Kingston	Kitsap	Washington		Native American	Owned by the Port Gamble S'Klallam Tribe
Tulalip Resort Casino at Quil Ceda	Marysville	Snohomish	Washington		Native American	Owned by the Tulalip Tribes of Washington
Tulalip Resort Casino	Tulalip	Snohomish	Washington		Native American	Owned by the Tulalip Tribes of Washington

== List of card rooms ==
Permitted by the state, card rooms are establishments that offers card games for play.

List of card rooms in the U.S. state of Washington
Casino	City	County	State	District	Type	Comments
Buzz Inn Casino and Steakhouse	East Wenatchee	Douglas	Washington		Card room
Clearwater Poker Room	Wenatchee	Chelan	Washington		Card room
Club Hollywood Casino	Shoreline	King	Washington		Card room (Nevada Gold)
Coyote Bob's Casino	Kennewick	Benton	Washington		Card room (Nevada Gold)
Crazy Moose Casino - Mountlake Terrace	Mountlake Terrace	Snohomish	Washington		Card room (Nevada Gold)
Crazy Moose Casino - Pasco	Pasco	Franklin	Washington		Card room (Nevada Gold)
Joker's Casino	Richland	Benton	Washington		Card room
Lancer Casino	Clarkston	Asotin	Washington		Card room
Lucky Dragonz Casino	Seattle	King	Washington		Card room
Mr. Z's Casino	Pullman	Whitman	Washington		Card room
New Phoenix Casino	La Center	Clark	Washington		Card room
Nob Hill Casino	Yakima	Yakima	Washington		Card room
Red Dragon Casino	Mountlake Terrace	Snohomish	Washington		Card room (Nevada Gold)
Roxy's Casino	Seattle	King	Washington		Card room
Royal Casino	Everett	Snohomish	Washington		Card room (Nevada Gold)
Silver Dollar Casino - Mill Creek	Mill Creek	Snohomish	Washington		Card room (Nevada Gold)
Silver Dollar Casino - Renton	Renton	King	Washington		Card room (Nevada Gold)
Silver Dollar Casino - SeaTac	SeaTac	King	Washington		Card room (Nevada Gold)
Wild Goose Casino	Ellensburg	Kittitas	Washington		Card room
Wizards Casino	Burien	King	Washington		Card room
Caribbean Casino and Cardroom	Kirkland	King	Washington		Card room
Fortune Poker	Renton	King	Washington		Card room
Macau Casino	Lakewood	Pierce	Washington		Card room

== Gallery ==
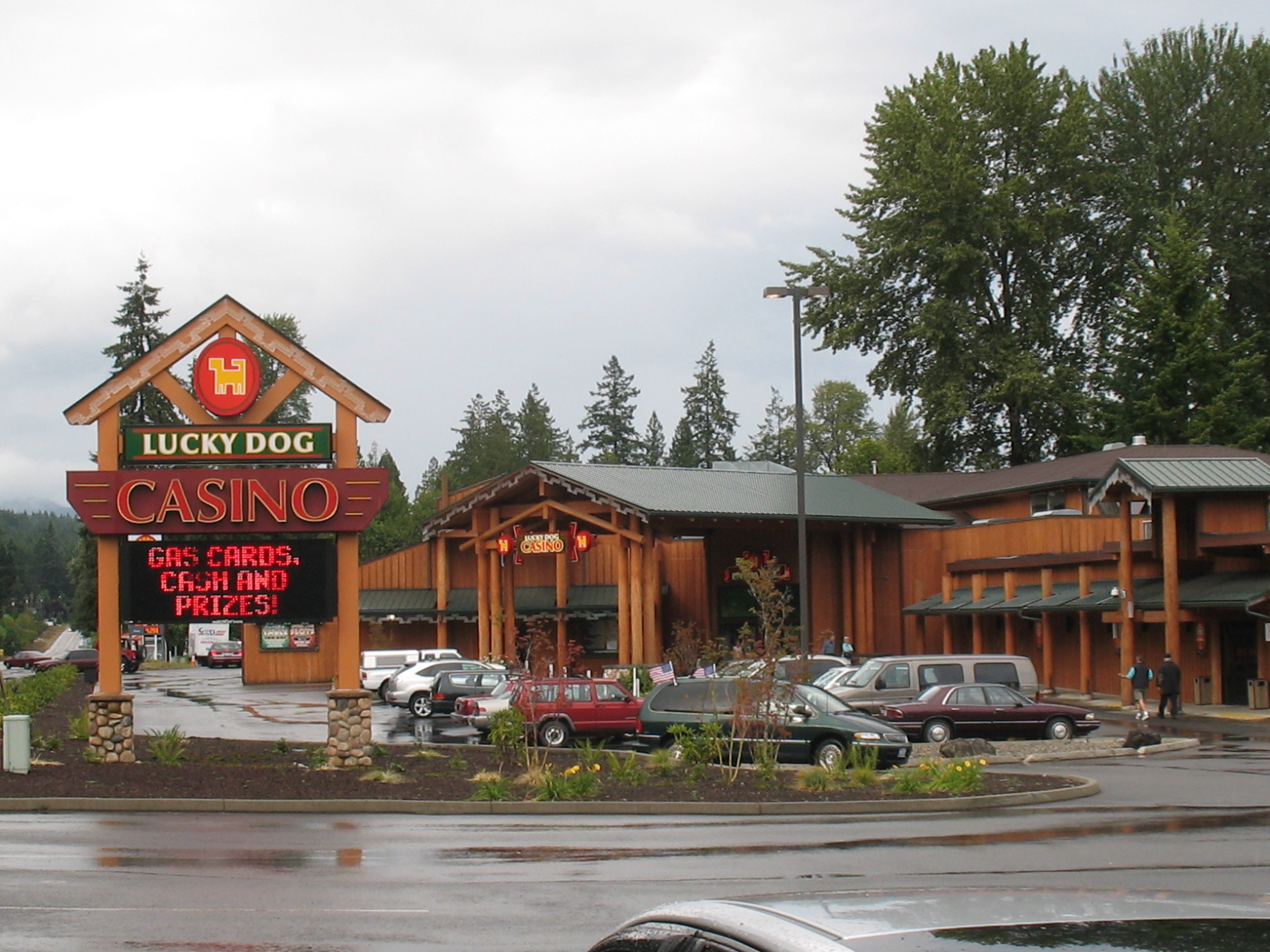

== See also ==
- List of casinos in the United States
- List of casino hotels
