= Treaty of Point Elliott =

1855 treaty between the US and Native Americans

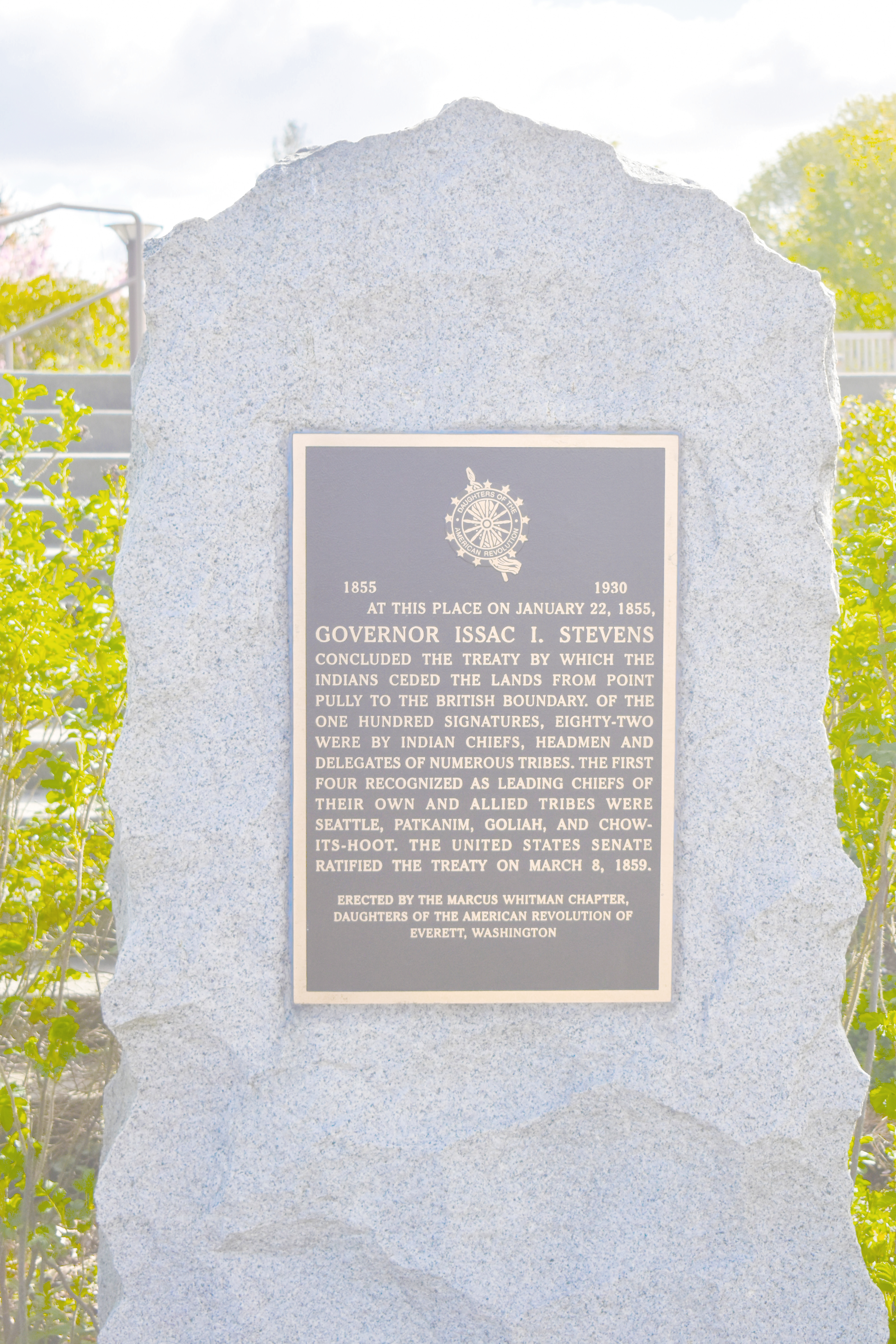
Plaque near the location of the signing of the Treaty of Point Elliott, Mukilteo, Washington.

The Treaty of Point Elliott of 1855, or the Point Elliott Treaty,—also known as the Treaty of Point Elliot / Point Elliot Treaty—is the lands settlement treaty between the United States government and the Native American tribes of the greater Puget Sound region in the recently formed Washington Territory (March 1853), one of about thirteen treaties between the U.S. and Native Nations in what is now Washington. The treaty was signed on January 22, 1855, at Muckl-te-oh or Point Elliott, now Mukilteo, Washington, and ratified 8 March and 11 April 1859. Between the signing of the treaty and the ratification, fighting continued throughout the region. Lands were being occupied by European-Americans since settlement in what became Washington Territory began in earnest from about 1845.

Signatories to the Treaty of Point Elliott included Chief Seattle (si'áb Si'ahl) and Territorial Governor Isaac Stevens. Representatives from the Duwamish, Suquamish, Snoqualmie, Snohomish, Lummi, Upper and Lower Skagit, Swinomish, (in order of signing) and other tribes also signed.

The treaty established the Suquamish Port Madison, Tulalip, Swin-a-mish (Swinomish), and Lummi reservations. The Native American signers included Suquamish and Dwamish (Duwamish) Chief Seattle, Snoqualmoo (Snoqualmie) and Sno-ho-mish Chief Patkanim as Pat-ka-nam, Lummi Chief Chow-its-hoot, and Skagit Chief Goliah. The Duwamish signatories to the Point Elliott Treaty of January 22, 1855 were si'áb Si'ahl as Chief Seattle, and Duwamish si'áb Ts'huahntl, si'áb Now-a-chais, and si'áb Ha-seh-doo-an. The treaty guaranteed both fishing rights and reservations. Reservations were not designated for the Duwamish, Skagit, Snohomish, and Snoqualmie peoples.

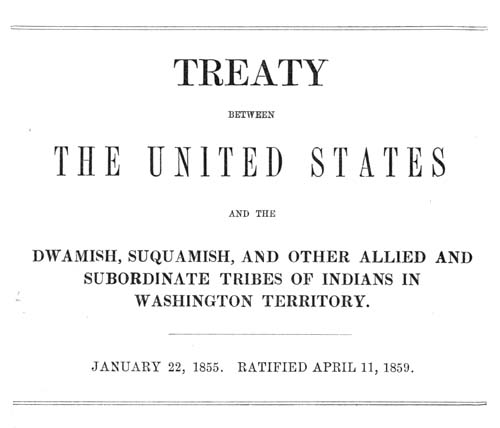

== Context ==
The Nonintercourse Act of 1834 specifically prohibited White American intrusion into Indian territories. The Oregon Donation Land Claim Act of 1850 opened Oregon Territory to European-American settlement; Washington Territory had a similar law. The law sunset 1 December 1855; settlers had to file their land claims by that date, so White leaders had incentive to get treaties signed with Native Americans as speedily as possible to enable development by whites.

Under the laws encouraging settlement, each male settler could homestead and receive 320 acres (1.3 km^{2}) free for himself and 640 acres with his wife (women could not individually hold property). Settlers arriving before 1850 could receive 640 acres (2.6 km^{2}), or 1 Regular Section, one square mile. Claims were made by unilateral occupation, implicitly backed by militia if not military. Native Americans were disconcerted by the encroachment of the settlers on their territory, and sometimes reacted by making raids or forming uprisings against them.

By and large, Native leaders were willing to sell their land (although they had utterly different conceptions of land use and no cultural comprehension of European-American property rights concepts). They rejected proposals for their relocation from Puget Sound country.

The courts have said that the power of Congress in Indian affairs is plenary (full and complete)—great but under present law not absolute. The federal government and tribes are co-equal sovereign entities; the tribal governments predated the existence of the United States. One of the basic principles underlying Indian nations is that they "retain all the inherent powers of any sovereign nation", retaining all original sovereign rights and powers "which have not been given up or taken away by due process" of law. Courts have ruled that the "intent of Congress to limit the sovereign powers of Indian governments by legislation must be clearly expressed in the law in order to be effective" (in legal terminology, per Saito, Georgia State University College of Law). [Emphasis added.]

The U.S. Constitution, Article 6, states:

This Constitution, and the laws of the United States which shall be made in persuance thereof; and all treaties made, or which shall be made, under the authority of the United States, shall be the supreme law of the land; and the judges in every state shall be bound thereby, anything in the Constitution or laws of any State to the contrary notwithstanding. [Emphasis added.]

Particularly since the rise of Native American activism in the late twentieth century, there have been new legal challenges to numerous treaties, land settlements, and terms of treaties. The Supreme Court has ruled that there are "canons of construction" for interpreting treaties; of the two principal canons, one is that they are to be interpreted as they would have been understood by the signatories. The Supreme Court has ruled that "Treaties are to be construed as a grant of rights from the Indians, not to them—and a reservation of those not granted." (This principle has guided, for instance, the retention of Native Americans of traditional rights to fish and hunt on land ceded to the government, unless those rights were specifically restricted.

A treaty broken is not rescinded. Only a following treaty or agreement can relieve signatories of the original treaty. "Treaties are as old and as venerable as the Constitution of the United States. Age does not impair their validity or legality." [Deloria, 1994]

Indian tribes, for the most part, were not parties to and rarely agreed with the diminution in their sovereign powers by the alien tradition of European law. They have often claimed, in cases since the late twentieth century, to retain greater sovereign powers than federal Indian law is prepared to concede. The resulting political dynamic has resulted in tensions and disputes among tribal, federal, and state governments about sovereign powers and jurisdiction denied to tribes by the colonial justifications underlying federal law, which tribes and members point out they never voluntarily surrendered. Diminution of sovereignty is usually absent from accession of lands.

== Governor Stevens and the U.S. government ==
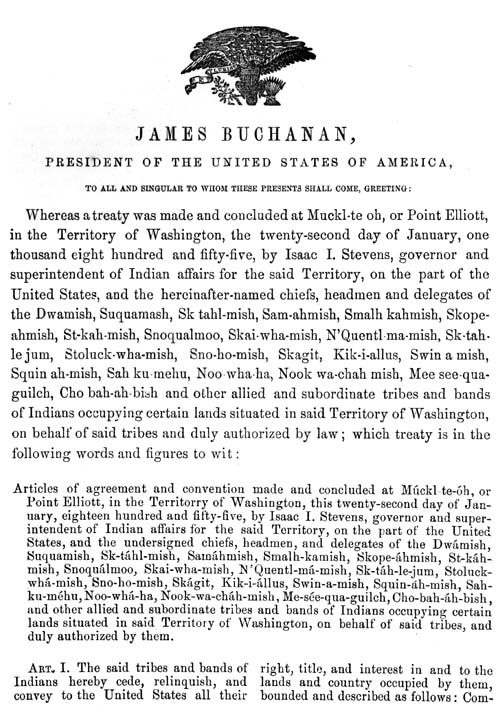

Washington Territory Governor Isaac Stevens frequently made oral promises to tribal representatives that were not matched by what his office put in writing. As oral cultures, the Native tribes took him at his word. Stevens approved treaties which Judge James Wickerson would characterize forty years later as "unfair, unjust, ungenerous, and illegal".

The local natives had a 30-year history of dealing with the "King George's men" of Hudson's Bay Company (HBC), who had developed a reputation for driving a hard bargain, but sticking honestly to what they agreed to, and for treating Whites and Indians impartially. This continued through the dealings of the local Bureau of Indian Affairs (BIA) Superintendent General, Joel Palmer. Together with Indian Agent Mike Simmons (David 'Doc' Maynard's brother-in-law), he was described as among the few even-handed men in the BIA. They were not prepared for the less straightforward approach of Stevens and his staff.

The Washington Territory treaties, such as the Treaty of Medicine Creek (1854) and this Treaty of Point Elliott of 1855 (January 22) were followed by the Treaty of Walla Walla of 1855. Governor Stevens ignored federal government instructions to stick to sorting out the areas where natives and settlers were immediately adjacent to one another or where settlers moved in on Native places, and tried to settle Native issues for the territory. Natives were angered by his pushing in other areas. Their concept of war had more to do with resources and complex concepts of prestige than with conquest or annihilation, which were not even considered.

Historian Morgan suggested that Stevens appointed certain chiefs of tribes in order to facilitate goals of his administration.

"The salient features of the policy outlined [by Governor Stevens to his advisers] were as follows:

1. To concentrate the Indians upon a few reservations, and encourage them to cultivate the soil and adopt settled and civilized habits.
2. To pay for their lands not in money, but in annuities of blankets, clothing, and useful articles during a long term of years.
3. To furnish them with schools, teachers, farmers and farming implements, blacksmiths, and carpenter, with shops of those trades.
4. To prohibit wars and disputes among them.
5. To abolish slavery.
6. To stop as far as possible the use of liquor.
7. As the change from savage to civilized habits must necessarily be gradual, we were to retain the right of fishing at our accustomed fishing-places, and of hunting, gathering berries and roots, and pasturing stock on unoccupied land as long as it remained vacant.
8. At some future time, when it should have become fitted for it, the lands of the reservations were to be allotted to them in severalty."

Indian tribes believed the treaties became effective when they were signed by the officials they had dealt with. But United States law required Congress to approve all treaties after they were negotiated by representatives. European Americans began to settle about 1845 but Congress did not approve the treaty until April 1859, which made such settlement legal. The U.S. government never implemented the provisions of the Treaty for the Duwamish, and several other tribes.

== Negotiations ==
=== Staff for the U.S. government ===
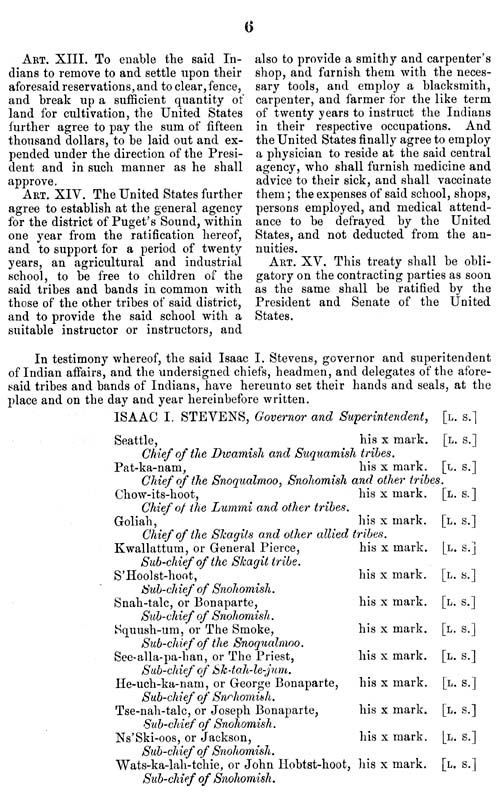

Initial Treaty Advisers, Washington Territory

- James Doty, Secretary
- George Gibbs, Surveyor [witness at treaty signing. Gibbs also kept extensive records and made expansive reports through his career; became a prominent historical primary source.]
- H. A. Goldsborough, Commissary
- B. F. Shaw, Interpreter
- Colonel M. T. Simmons

Point Elliott Treaty, advisers to Washington Territory

- M. T. Simmons, Special Indian Agent, [witness at treaty signing]
- H. A. Goldsborough, Commissary, [remaining member of the initial staff, witness at treaty signing]
- B. F. Shaw, Interpreter, [remaining member of the initial staff, witness at treaty signing]
- James Tilton, Surveyor-General, Washington Territory
- F. Kennedy
- J. Y. Miller
- H. D. Cock, [witness at treaty signing]

== Native Americans ==
Chiefs, as such, were appointed by Governor Stevens, though the treaty states "on behalf of said tribes, and duly authorized by them".

=== Signatory tribes ===
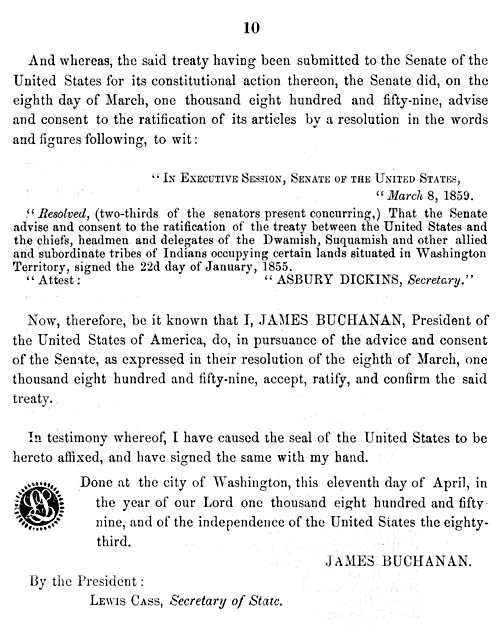

Dwamish (Duwamish), two peoples, the "People of the Inside (the environs of Elliott Bay)" and the "People of the Large Lake (Lake Washington)" (together known as the Duwamish)
Suquamish
Sk-kahl-mish (Skokomish), "River People" (one of nine historic Twana tribes)
Sam-ahmish (Sammamish)
Smalh-kamish (Smulkamish / Smalhkamish), "People of White River"
Skope-ahmish (Skopamish), "The People of the variable stream" or "Green ('fluctuating') River People"
St-kah-mish (Stkamish / Skekomish), "People of the village named log jam"
Snoqualmoo (Snoqualmie), "Strong People of Status"
Skai-wha-mish (Skykomish), "Upriver People" (originally considered a subdivision of the Snoqualmie)
N'Quentl-ma-mish (Kwehtlamamishes) (a Snohomish band)
Sk-tah-le-jum (perhaps a Snohomish band)
Stoluck-wha-mish (Stillaguamish)
Sno-ho-mish (Snohomish), "The Lowland People"
Lummi, "Facing one another"
Skagit, "The Hiding place" up river where people hid from northern attackers (who came by canoe), a place name for the Skagit River″
Kik-i-allus (Kikia'los) (a Swinomish band, but sometimes considered a Lower Skagit band)
Swin-a-mish (Swinomish) (sometimes considered a Lower Skagit band)
Squin-ah-mish
Sah-ku-mehu (Sauk-Suiattle) (misidentified as a Skagit band)
Noo-wha-ha (beside Upper Skagit, Lower Skagit and Kikiallus a fourth major regional Skagit group)
Nook-wa-chah-mish (perhaps the Nookachamps band of the Skagit tribes)
Mee-see-qua-guilch
Cho-bah-ah-bish (perhaps the Tcubaa'bish band of the Upper Skagit tribe)

=== Non-signatory tribes ===
For various reasons, the Nooksack, Semiahmoo, Lower Puyallup and Quileute tribes did not take part in the treaty councils, though the rights of the Nooksack were signed over by the Lummi chief Chow-its-hoot, without their presence. Samish attendance was documented by ethnologist George Gibbs and officially reported by Governor Issac Stevens. Although the Samish were listed next to the Lummi in the first draft of the treaty, it appears that line was inadvertently omitted during transcription of the final draft. Several tribes, such as the Duwamish and Snohomish, continue working toward official federal recognition. See also, for example, Duwamish (tribe).

=== Selected articles ===
The treaty includes the following provisions:

- ARTICLE 5.

The right of taking fish at usual and accustomed grounds and stations is further secured to said Indians in common with all citizens of the Territory,

Following a challenge by Native Americans in the late twentieth-century to federal policy excluding them from certain properties for fishing, they filed a suit. Judge George Boldt in the Boldt Decision (1974, upheld 1979) upheld their traditional right of access for fishing and hunting, as it was not restricted by the treaty.

- ARTICLE 7.

The President may hereafter, when in his opinion the interests of the Territory shall require and the welfare of the said Indians be promoted, remove them from either or all of the special reservations herein before make to the said general reservation, or such other suitable place within said Territory as he may deem fit, on remunerating them for their improvements and the expenses of such removal, or may consolidate them with other friendly tribes or bands; and he may further at his discretion cause the whole or any portion of the lands hereby reserved, or of such other land as may be selected in lieu thereof, to be surveyed into lots, and assign the same to suc[h] individuals or families as are willing to avail themselves of the privilege, and will locate on the same as a permanent home on the same terms and subject to the same regulations as are provided in the sixth article of the treaty with the Omahas, so far as the same may be applicable.

An attorney in the employ of the Natives during negotiations was concerned on their behalf with this language.

- ARTICLE 12.

The said tribes and bands further agree not to trade at Vancouver's Island or elsewhere out of the dominions of the United States, nor shall foreign Indians be permitted to reside in their reservations without consent of the superintendent or agent.

The complete treaty, unabridged can be found on Wikisource.

== After the treaty ==
The Pacific Northwest tribes had traditionally depended on harvests of salmon and other fish as a major part of their diets. Citing the treaties and their restrictions to reservations, the state and federal government increasingly restricted their fishing after 1890. There was a rise in both commercial and sports fisheries, dominated by European Americans. State repression increased through the 1950s.

In a period of increased activism, in the 1960s several Native American tribes in the Northwest began protest fish-ins. They peacefully and successfully outmaneuvered police, garnering wide media attention. The Boldt Decision in 1974, which interpreted the Native Americans as having traditional rights to fish because they were not explicitly restricted by this and other treaties, was followed by state efforts to restrict them and resistance to their fishing by non-Indians. The case was appealed and in 1979, the US Supreme Court upheld Boldt's ruling in the lower court.

Today regional fisheries councils, in which Native Americans, sports and commercial fishermen participate together with federal scientists and attorneys, annually review the status of particular fisheries to see how many fish are available for harvest, to review protection plans or their need, and to develop how they will share the harvests.

In the same period, Native Americans outside reservations and without federal recognition, such as the Nooksack tribe, Upper Skagit, Sauks-Suiattle, and Stillaguamish peoples, won federal recognition in the 1970s, in order to secure certain financial benefits, including aid to education for their children. The BIA made the decisions based on their operating as cohesive political communities during the long treaty-rights struggles. Federal courts denied recognition to the Snohomish, Steilacoom, and Duwamish, because they were not recognized as polities (civil governments).

== Point Elliott Treaty Monument ==
In 1930, the Point Elliott Treaty Monument was erected by the Marcus Whitman Chapter of the Daughters of the American Revolution at the northeast corner of Lincoln Avenue and 3rd Street in Mukilteo. The monument, a 6.5 by 3 feet (1.98 m × 0.91 m) slab of granite, is 15 inches (380 mm) thick. A bronze plaque mounted on the west face is inscribed with text written by Edmond S. Meany. The monument commemorates the signing of the treaty, however the precise location of the signing is unknown. The Point Elliott Treaty Monument was added to the National Register of Historic Places on April 14, 2004.

As of 2024, the plaque at the monument reads:

1885 1930

At this place on January 22, 1855,

Governor Issac I. Stevens concluded the treaty by which the Indians ceded the lands from Point Pully to the British boundary. Of the one hundred signatures, eighty-two were signed by Indian chiefs, headmen and delegates of numerous tribes. The first four recognized as leading chiefs of their own and allied tribes were Seattle, Patkanim, Goliah, and Chow-its-hoot. The United States Senate ratified the treaty on March 8, 1859.

Erected by Marcus Whitman Chapter, Daughters of the American Revolution of Everett, Washington

== See also ==
- Duwamish (tribe) # History
- History of Seattle before 1900 # Relations with Native Americans
- Histories of other Puget Sound Native American tribes
- Quinault Treaty

== Bibliography ==
- Black, Henry Campbell; Garner, Bryan A. (1999). Law dictionary. St. Paul, MN: West Group. ISBN 0-314-24130-2.
- Clinton, Robert N. (1994). "Sovereignty". In Davis, Mary B. (ed.). Native America in the twentieth century: an encyclopedia. Vol. Garland reference library of social science, v. 452. New York: Garland. p. 611.
- Deloria, Vine Jr. (1994). "Treaty". In Davis, Mary B. (ed.). Native America in the twentieth century: an encyclopedia. New York: Garland. pp. 645–9. ISBN 0-8240-4846-6.
- Fraley, Kevin, Washington Archives Manager (2000). "Washington Indian Treaties". US GenWeb Archives. Archived from the original on 2006-02-21.
- Furtwangler, Albert (1997). Answering Chief Seattle. Seattle and London: University of Washington Press. ISBN 0-295-97633-0.
- Harmon, Alexandra (1996). "Puget Sound Tribes". In Hoxie, Frederick E. (ed.). Encyclopedia of North American Indians. Boston: Houghton Mifflin. pp. 522–4. ISBN 0-395-66921-9.
- Holm, Tom (Cherokee, Creek) (1996). "Warriors and warfare". In Hoxie, Frederick E. (ed.). Encyclopedia of North American Indians. Boston: Houghton Mifflin. pp. 666–8. ISBN 0-395-66921-9.
- "January 22, 1855: Treaty of Point Elliott". The Treaty Trail: U.S. – Indian Treaty Councils in the Northwest. Washington State History Museum. 2004. Archived from the original on September 27, 2007.
- Lange, Greg (2003-02-19). "U.S. President Millard Fillmore establishes Washington Territory on March 2, 1853". HistoryLink.org Essay 5244.
  Lange referenced Thomas W. Prosch, "A Chronological History of Seattle From 1850 to 1897" Typescript dated 1900–1901, Northwest Collection, University of Washington Library, Seattle, 36–37;
  Edmond S Meany, "The Cowlitz Convention: Inception of Washington Territory" The Washington Historical Quarterly, Vol. 13, No. 1 (January 1922), 3–19.
- Long, Priscilla (2001-01-20). "Duwamish Tribe wins federal recognition on January 19, 2001, but loses it again two days later". HistoryLink.org Essay 2951.
  Long referenced Hector Castro and Mike Barber, "After Decades, Duwamish Tribe Wins Federal Recognition", Seattle Post-Intelligencer January 20, 2001, (www.seattlep-i.com);
  Bernard McGhee, "Duwamish Tribe Wins Recognition", The Seattle Times, January 20, 2001, (www.seattletimes.com);
  Bureau of Indian Affairs, "BIA Issues Final Determination on the Recognition of the Duwamish Tribal Organization", News Release, January 19, 2001 (http://www.doi.gov/bia);
  Sara Jeanne Greene, "Chief Seattle's Tribe Clings to its Identity", The Seattle Times, June 18, 2001 (www.seattletimes.com);
  Susan Gilmore, "Duwamish Denied Tribal Status", Ibid., September 29, 2001 ().
  Note: This file was revised on 3 August 2001 and again on 20 January 2001.
- Morgan, Murray (1982) [1951]. Skid Road: an Informal Portrait of Seattle. revised and updated, first illustrated edition. Seattle and London: University of Washington Press. ISBN 0-295-95846-4.
- "Page 10". Treaty between the United States and the Duwamish, Suquamish, and other allied and subordinate tribes of Indians in Washington Territory: January 22, 1855, ratified April 11, 1859. University of Washington Libraries: Digital Collections. 1999-05-21.
- Saito, Natsu Taylor (2006). "Introduction to American Indian Sovereignty: Indian Rights to Sovereignty". Georgia State University College of Law. Archived from the original on 2006-08-23.
- Speidel, William C. ("Bill") (1978). Doc Maynard: the man who invented Seattle. Seattle: Nettle Creek Publishing Company. pp. 196–197, 200. ISBN 0-914890-02-6.
  Speidel provides a substantial bibliography with extensive primary sources.
- Speidel, William C. ("Bill") (1967). Sons of the profits; or, There's no business like grow business: the Seattle story, 1851-1901. Seattle: Nettle Creek Publishing Company. pp. 196–197, 200. ISBN 0-914890-00-X.
  Speidel provides a substantial bibliography with extensive primary sources.
- "Treaties and Councils: Introduction". The Treaty Trail: U.S. – Indian Treaty Councils in the Northwest. Washington State History Museum. 2004.
- "Treaties and Councils: Stevens' Entourage". The Treaty Trail: U.S. – Indian Treaty Councils in the Northwest. Washington State History Museum. 2004. Archived from the original on 2006-08-12.
- "Treaty of Point Elliott, 1855". Governors Office of Indian Affairs, State of Washington.
