= Suquamish Clearwater Casino Resort =

Casino and hotel in Washington state, U.S.

- Interactive map of Suquamish Clearwater Casino Resort
- Location: 15347 Suquamish Way NE Suquamish, WA 98392; 47.71229°N 122.57099°W
- Opened: 1995
- No. of rooms: 183
- Gaming space: 1200 Slots
- Owner: Suquamish tribe
- Website: www.clearwatercasino.com

The Suquamish Clearwater Casino Resort (also known as the Clearwater Casino) is a casino and hotel located in Kitsap County, Washington, and owned by Port Madison Enterprises, the economic development authority of the Suquamish tribe.

== History ==
The land on which the Clearwater Casino is sited was purchased by the Suquamish in 1988 and, early on, hosted a tribal smoke shop. In 1992 the Suquamish tribe opened a bingo hall on the site. This was followed by a fabric tent housing a small casino in 1995. A permanent casino building was constructed in 2003, followed by an 85-room hotel in 2006. In 2015, a further expansion increased convention and meeting space and grew hotel capacity by an additional 98 rooms.

Initially the land on which the casino was located was tribal-owned, but not part of the designated tribal trust lands. As such, property taxes were paid by the Suquamish to Kitsap County. A 1991 attempt by the tribe to re-designate the site as tribal territory failed due to the presence of liens on the property. The tribe began another attempt to have the casino property re-designated trust land in 2003, a process that finally saw fruition in 2009. Prior to the transfer, local government officials estimated the re-designation would cost the county approximately $458,000 per year in lost tax revenue.

== Features ==
=== Gaming ===
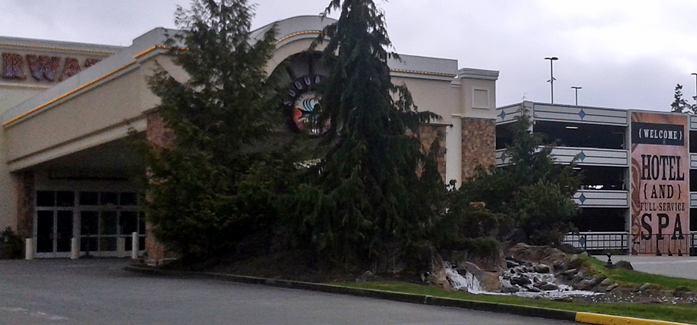
The Clearwater Casino pictured in early 2015

According to the casino, it operates more than 1200 slot machines, as well as keno and table games such a roulette and craps. The casino also has a poker room.

== Economic impact ==
In 2007, trade magazine Indian Gaming reported the tribe's several businesses, of which the casino is the largest, created a local economic impact of more than $138 million.

== See also ==
- List of casinos in Washington
- List of casinos in the United States
- List of casino hotels
