= Silver Reef Casino Resort =

Casino and resort in Ferndale, Washington

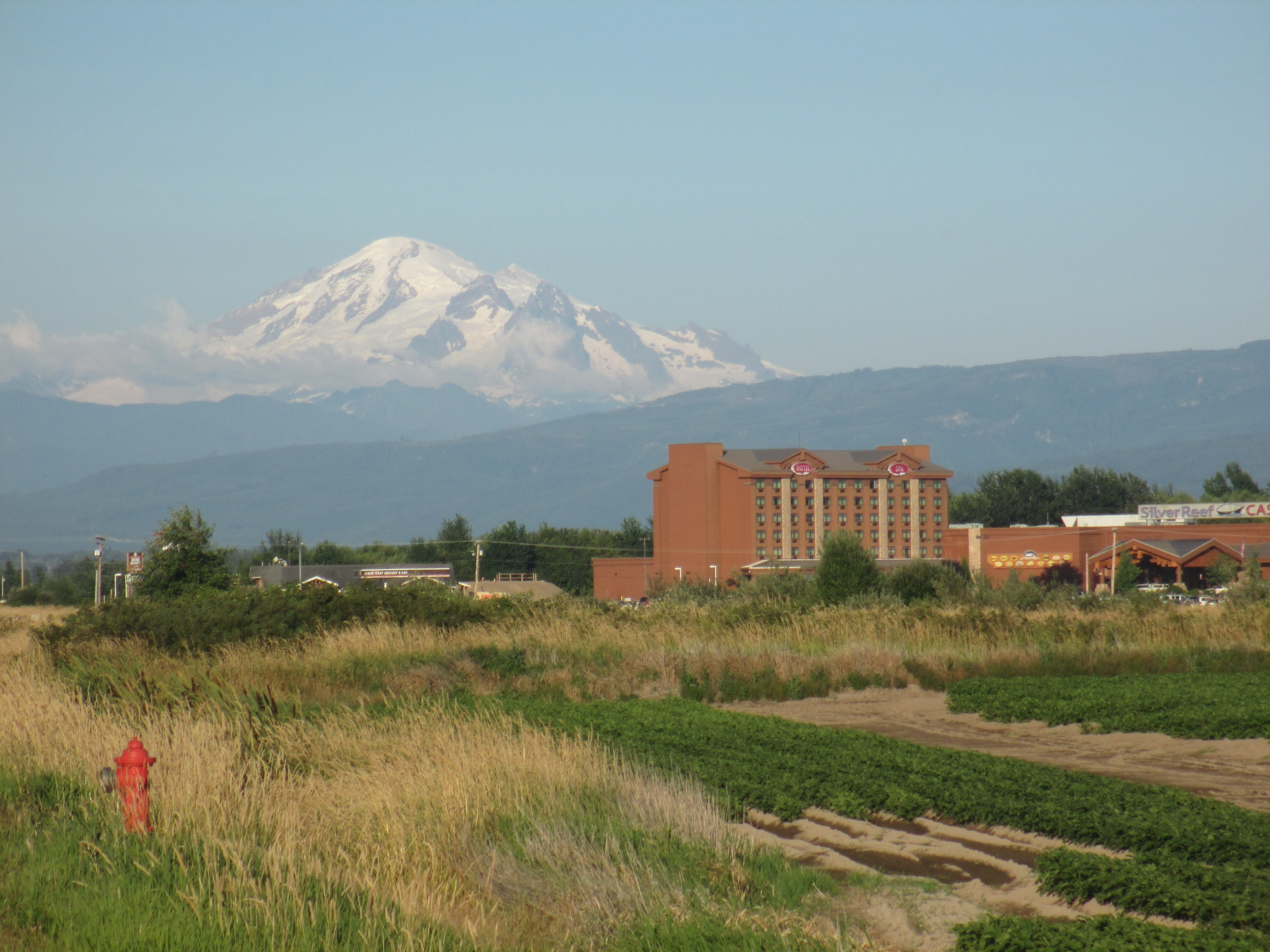
- Interactive map of Silver Reef Casino Resort
- Location: Ferndale, Washington, U.S.; 4876 Haxton Way; 48°49′04″N 122°37′36″W
- Opened: 2002
- Gaming space: 80,000 sq ft (7,400 m^{2})
- Casino type: Indian
- Owner: Lummi Nation
- Previous names: Silver Reef Casino
- Renovated in: 2013 (225 slot machines and new event center)
- Website: silverreefcasino.com

Silver Reef Casino Resort is an Indian casino and resort in Ferndale, Washington, United States. It is owned and operated by the Lummi Nation.

== History ==
It opened in 2002 and is the largest Casino resort within the Bellingham Metropolitan Area. It features 80,000 sq ft (7,400 m^{2}) of gaming space, 8 restaurants, 206 rooms and suites, A full-service spa, expansive meeting and event center spanning over 30,000 square feet, eight unique bars and restaurants, more than 1,000 slot machines, and 13 table games.

Silver Reef is the tribe's second casino, as their first one, The Lummi Casino, closed in 1997. Former Tribal Chairman Darrell Hillaire stated in 2002 that the tribe's initial objective was to utilize the casino's earnings for various tribal social, health, education, and economic development initiatives.

== See also ==
- List of casinos in Washington
- List of casino hotels
