= Joe Hillaire =

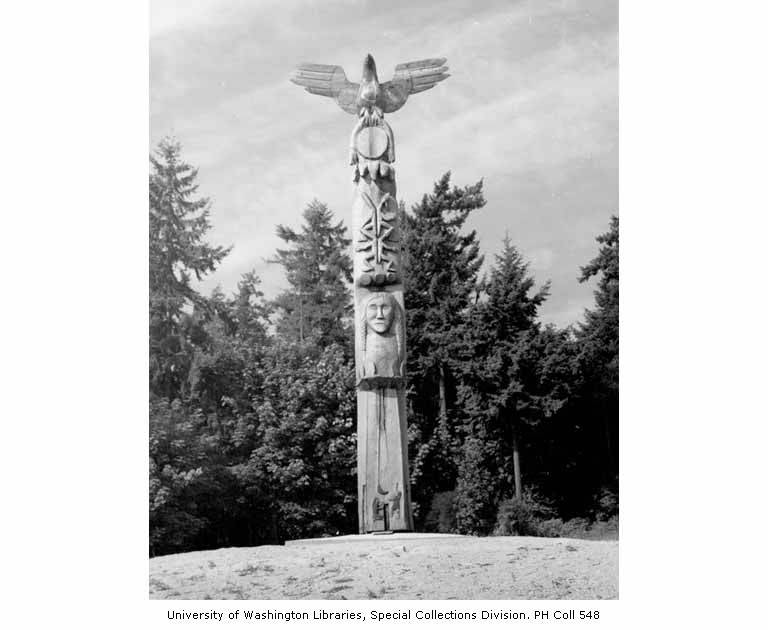
Lands-in-the-sky totem pole, Suquamish. Carved by Joe Hillaire for the 1962 Seattle World's Fair

Joseph Raymond Hillaire or Kwul-kwul’tw (1894–1967) was an American Indian sculptor of the Lummi (Lhaq’temish) tribe, known for his carved totem poles in the style of the Coast Salish peoples. In 1961 he carved the Kobe-Seattle Sister City Friendship Pole. Hillaire was the father of Pauline Hillaire Scälla (b. 1929), a well-known art historian and conservator specializing in the art of Northwest Coast peoples.

Joseph Hillaire was an active member of the Bahá’í Faith, serving as a member of his local Spiritual Assembly.
