= Northern Quest Resort & Casino =

Casino in Washington State, U.S.

- Interactive map of Northern Quest Resort & Casino
- Location: Airway Heights, Washington, United States; 100 N. Hayford Road; 47.6586°N 117.5609°W
- Opened: December 28, 2000; 25 years ago
- No. of rooms: 442
- Gaming space: 60,000 square feet (5,600 m^{2})
- Permanent shows: Pepsi Outdoor Concerts at BECU Live; Pend Oreille Pavilion
- Signature attractions: La Rive Spa; Legends of Fire; Turf Club Sports Book; Windfall; Highball; Northern Quest RV Resort; Kids Quest; Cyber Quest
- Notable restaurants: Masselow's Steakhouse; EPIC Sports Bar; East Pan Asian Cuisine; Neon Pizza; Marketplace; Fatburger; Qdoba Mexican Eats; Ben & Jerry's; Thomas Hammer
- Casino type: Indian
- Owner: Kalispel Tribe
- Architect: ALSC Architects
- Renovated in: 2008-2009 (hotel added); 2023 (second hotel tower added)
- Website: northernquest.com

Northern Quest Resort & Casino is a Native American casino in Airway Heights, Washington, near Spokane, owned and operated by the Kalispel Tribe of Indians. It features two hotel towers, a spa, an upscale cigar bar, more than a dozen restaurants and lounges, and two concert venues. The casino has nearly 60,000 square feet (5,600 m^{2}) of gaming space, with more than 1,500 slot machines, 39 table games, 9 poker tables, off-track betting, and a sportsbook.

In 2020, Business Insider Magazine named Northern Quest the 9th best casino in the country.

== Entertainment ==
=== Pend Oreille Pavilion ===
Pend Oreille Pavilion, the casino's 1,200-seat indoor concert venue, opened in 2004, bringing musical performances, comedy acts, and sporting events to Airway Heights.

The Pavilion also holds occasional amateur cage fighting and has been featured several times on Friday Night Fights on ESPN2 for boxing events. In 2012, Northern Quest hosted the inaugural U.S. Olympic Team Trials for Women's Boxing inside Pend Oreille Pavilion.

=== Pepsi Outdoor Concerts at BECU Live ===
In 2011, Northern Quest launched its outdoor concert venue, BECU Live, featuring seating for more than 5,000 guests. Each summer, the casino hosts big-name musicians and comedians during the Pepsi Outdoor Concerts.

Northern Quest was nominated for “Casino of the Year” in 2012 and 2022 by the Academy of Country Music Awards for the high caliber of the Pepsi Outdoor Concerts. The 2024 outdoor concert season was the casino’s largest to date, with 27 shows occurring between July and September.

Northern Quest has hosted many star-studded shows including Steve Miller Band, Journey, Toby Keith, Willie Nelson, Darius Rucker, Ringo Starr, Foreigner, Dierks Bentley, Sammy Hagar, Dolly Parton, Brad Paisley, Kelly Clarkson, Train, Pitbull, ZZ Top, Heart, and Snoop Dogg, as well as comedians: Gabriel Iglesias, Steve Martin & Martin Short, and Jeff Dunham.

== Opening and expansion ==
On December 28, 2000, the Kalispel Tribe opened Northern Quest Casino, consisting of 55,540 square feet of gaming, restaurants, and back-of-house operations. In 2002, 35,000 square feet of additional gaming space opened to the public.

In 2009, the Tribe opened a 250-room hotel, and the casino was renamed Northern Quest Resort & Casino. Completed along with the new resort were La Rive Spa, Masselow’s Steakhouse, The Lounge at Masselow’s, and Marketplace. This new expansion increased the size of Northern Quest to more than a half-million square feet and allowed the Tribe to employ more than 2,000 people.

In 2018, the casino opened Windfall, a 13,000-square-foot retail space featuring outdoor brands, apparel, and home goods.

In 2019, Northern Quest RV Resort opened near Northern Quest, offering additional overnight options with 67 RV sites and 18 one- and two-bedroom cottages.

In December 2021, with sports betting recently legalized in Washington State for tribal casinos, Northern Quest opened Turf Club Sports Book. The state-of-the-art sportsbook allows guests to place legal wagers on sporting events of all kinds.

In 2023, the Kalispel Tribe opened the River Tower, a second hotel tower featuring 192 rooms and suites, bringing the total number of rooms at Northern Quest to 442, and earning Northern Quest the new title of largest casino resort in Washington State.

== See also ==
- List of casinos in Washington
- List of casinos in the United States
- List of casino hotels
