= Lummi Nation School =

Tribal school in Whatcom County, Washington, USA

Coordinates: 48.7287°N 122.6543°W

Lummi Nation School (LNS) is a K-12 tribal school for the Lummi people, in unincorporated Whatcom County, Washington, with a Bellingham postal address. It is affiliated with the Bureau of Indian Education (BIE).

It has a compact with the state of Washington and receives a grant from the Bureau of Indian Education (BIE).

According to Kira M. Cox of the Seattle Times, circa 2003-2008 the school had significant staff and principal turnover, low test scores, and low student discipline. Five superintendents and three principals were in place during that period.

According to Cox, after 2008, when Heather Leighton became principal, conditions improved. In 2008 there were 350 students.

A related boarding facility for the tribal school, Lummi Youth Academy, opened in 2008. It cost $2.1 million to build and was to hold up to 40 boarders in grades 8–12, with a staff of 21 employees. The Gates Foundation and other charitable entities planned to help cover the $1.4 million yearly cost of operations. An equal number of male and female students may be accommodated. Students may live at school year round, or they may visit family on weekends.
