= Cypress Island Atlantic salmon pen break =

2017 ecological disaster in Washington, US

Coordinates: 48°33′32″N 122°40′45″W

On August 19, 2017, a net pen at a salmon farm near Cypress Island, Washington, broke, accidentally releasing hundreds of thousands of non-native Atlantic salmon into the Pacific Ocean. The fish farm was run by Cooke Aquaculture Pacific, LLC. According to the Washington State Department of Natural Resources, inadequate cleaning was likely the primary cause for the pen break; the nets were supporting more than six times their own weight in biofouling. Coastal tribes were hired to fish the escaped salmon. Atlantic salmon farming was later banned in Washington state in reaction to the incident.

== Background ==
Prior to the incident, Washington was the only US state on the Pacific coast where Atlantic salmon was farmed. Atlantic salmon are favored by salmon farmers, because their domestication process is much farther along; farmed Atlantic salmon have been selected for faster growth, higher tolerance to disease, and greater docility.

The net pen was managed by Cooke Aquaculture, a Canadian company based in New Brunswick and one of the largest aquaculture companies in the world. It took over the Cypress Island aquafarms in 2016. The pen that was breached was a 10-cage salmon pen that contained 305,000 fish, and had been placed in 2001. It was anchored in Deepwater Bay, southeast of Cypress Island and to the west of Bellingham Channel (which separates Cypress Island from Guemes Island). The pen was submerged from 65 to 100 ft (20 to 30 m), and was approximately 182 ft (55 m) wide by 436 ft (133 m) long. The August 2017 pen break was preceded by an incident a month earlier with the same pen; on July 24 and 25 its mooring failed, was restored, failed again, and was restored a second time. This incident occurred during the strongest tidal currents of the summer of 2017.

The salmon pens had been stocked with 369,312 smolts in May 2016, and had been scheduled to be harvested starting September 2017. At the time of the incident, the biomass held by the salmon pen was estimated to be around 2,844,000 pounds (1,290 t).

== Incident ==
The pen break was reported by a boater on August 19, 2017. The Washington State Department of Natural Resources estimated that 243,000 to 263,000 salmon escaped the pen, a number that was much higher than Cooke Aquaculture Pacific's estimates of 4,000 to 5,000 salmon. The company later estimated that around 160,000 fish had escaped.

According to Cooke Aquaculture Pacific, the pen break was due to unusually strong tidal currents during that week's solar eclipse. However, Washington State Department of Natural Resources investigators found that the tidal currents were well within the range that the same pen had survived in previous years, and the solar eclipse did not affect the tidal currents significantly. The investigators determined that insufficient maintenance, especially lack of cleaning, was the primary cause of the break. They found that the pen—about 18 short tons (16 metric tons) of net material—was supporting around 110 short tons (100 metric tons) of biofouling, more than six times its own weight.

== Aftermath ==
In the immediate aftermath of the incident, the Washington State Department of Fish and Wildlife authorized the unlimited catching of escaped Atlantic salmon from the farm, and around 57,000 were recaptured, leaving two thirds or more of the fish unaccounted for. Coastal tribes such as the Swinomish, Samish, and Lummi were involved in recapturing them. The Lummi declared a state of emergency and caught around 44,000, approximately 393,000 pounds (178 t).

The salmon were sold back to Cooke Aquaculture Pacific, which paid $30 per fish. Cooke offered to raise the price to $42 per fish if the Lummi were willing to abandon their pursuit of a prohibition of salmon aquaculture, but they refused. In November and December 2017, some of the salmon were captured from the Skagit River by members of the Upper Skagit Indian Tribe, who were still finding them in April 2018, up to eight months after the incident.

The Washington State Senate passed a bill in March 2018 banning the farming of Atlantic salmon in the state, the ban to be complete by 2025. In April 2018, the Thurston County Superior Court upheld the termination of Cooke Aquaculture Pacific's farming license by the Washington State Department of Natural Resources; this effectively prevented the company from restocking its Atlantic salmon fishing pens again before the ban took effect.

In November 2022, the Department of Natural Resources announced they would no longer be approving permits for aquatic land leases for net pens and would be moving to prohibit commercial finfish net pen aquaculture on state-owned aquatic lands. By July 2023, the last seven net pen sites were placed on inactive status, and no fish or net pen structures were left in the water.

== Documentary ==
Annie Crawley's documentary short film Frankenfish concerning the event was selected for the 2018 Seattle International Film Festival. The film was also shown at the National Oceanographic and Atmospheric Administration–University of Washington Sea Grant Program's River and Ocean Film Festival the same year.
