= Tribal Canoe Journeys =

Annual event

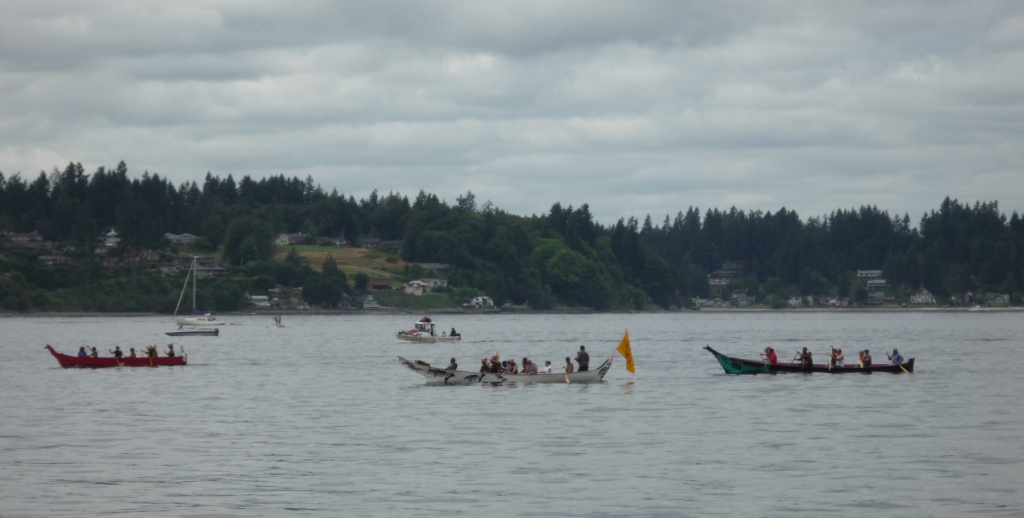
Participants in the Paddle to Squaxin, 2012

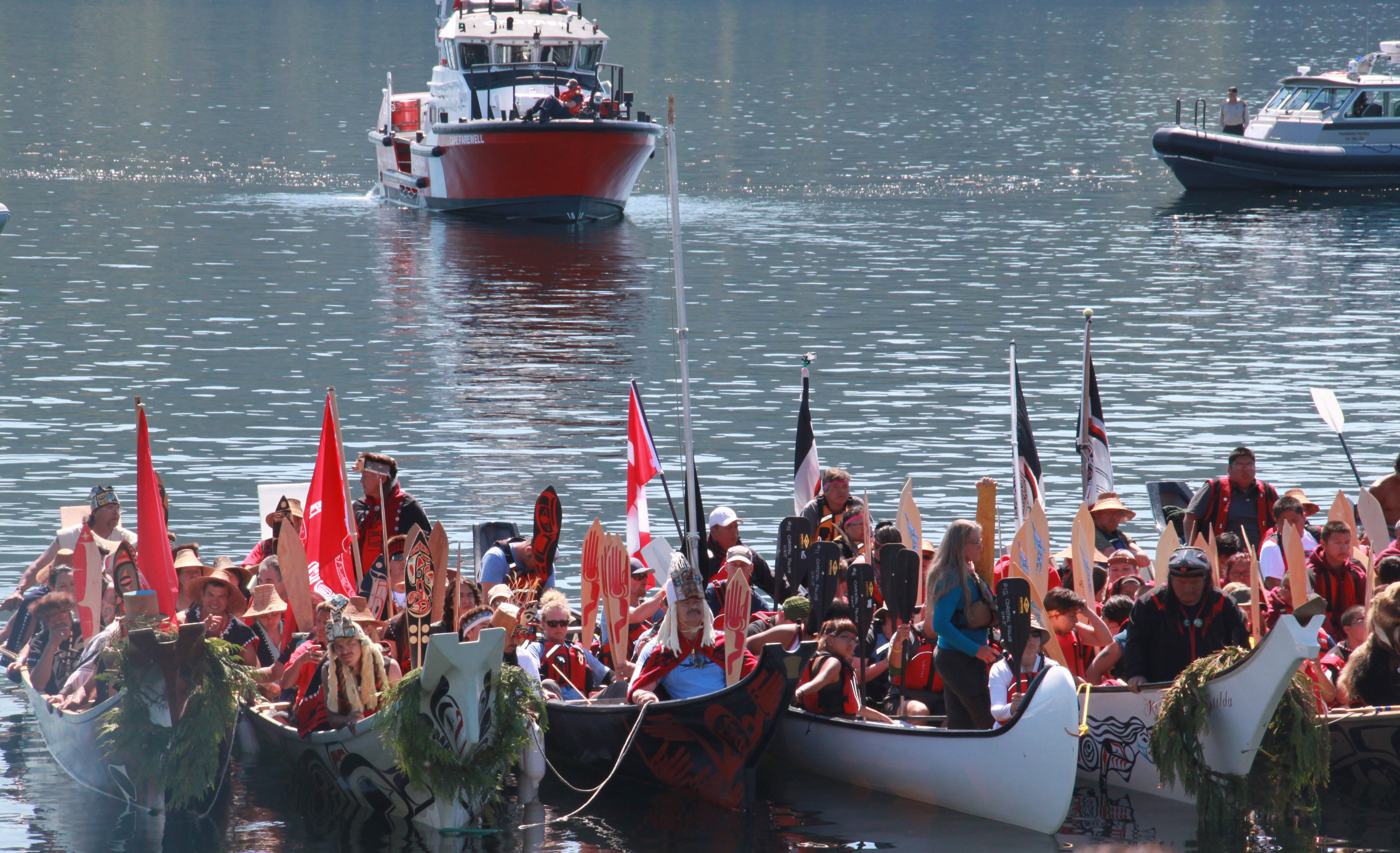
Canoes during the 2014 Qatuwas Festival

The Intertribal Canoe Journey is a celebrated event of the Indigenous peoples of the Pacific Northwest Coast. Organizers call it the Canoe Journey or Intertribal Canoe Journey, and colloquially Tribal Journeys. It is also referred to by its destination, i.e. Paddle to Muckleshoot.

The annual Canoe Journey is a gathering of canoe cultures from Indigenous Nations from the coasts of Alaska, British Columbia, Oregon and Washington. It first took place in 1989 as part of Washington's Centennial celebration, and has since attracted participants from other Pacific Rim Indigenous canoe cultures, such as Ainu, Hawai'ian and Maori. The Canoe Journey emerged after years of government oppression of Indigenous cultures and sparked a renewal of traditional travel upon ancestral waters, canoe carving, sharing cultural protocols, and passing on cultural teachings to young people. The Canoe Journeys for 2020 and 2021 were canceled because of the COVID-19 pandemic.

Many families and teams travel in canoes featuring art and names reflective of their place of origin, and they wear traditional regalia for celebrations which feature the sharing of songs, dances and gifting. Some canoes are made of cedar; others are made using more modern techniques and materials. Canoe families visit Native Nations en route to the final host destination, which changes each year.

Hosting the Canoe Journey is a logistical feat for any host nation, as the host feeds all guests breakfast and dinner; provides shuttles and venues for camping, dining and protocol; and provides gifts to guests as well as the next year's host. Hosting the Canoe Journey can cost at least $1 million.

At the conclusion of its hosting in 2007, the Lummi Nation gifted a story pole topped by a canoe to the following year's host, the Quw'utsun First Nation. The Quinault Nation gifted several hand-carved cedar canoes to select honored guests when it hosted in 2013. The Swinomish Tribe built a waterfront park, featuring three covered pavilions that resemble woven cedar hats, in time for its hosting in 2011.

Gov. Christine Gregoire was a puller in Swinomish Chairman Brian Cladoosby's canoe in 2011. State House Speaker Pro Tem Jeff Morris, who is Tsimshian but had a Samish grandfather, was a puller in the Samish Nation's canoe in the 2012 Paddle to Squaxin.

== History ==
"These majestic vessels, crafted from a single log often hundreds of years old, all but disappeared early in this century. It is hard to explain why so little has been written about them, as they are probably the single most important aspect of Northwest Coast culture.... the canoe was as important as the automobile is now to North America." — David Neel, "The Great Canoes: Reviving a Northwest Coast Tradition."

The Canoe Journey is a significant cultural experience for all participants. The first modern Canoe Journey was organized in 1989 by Quinault educator Emmett Oliver, a member of the state's centennial planning committee who wanted to ensure the Indigenous peoples of the state were represented in the celebration. This event became known as the "Paddle to Seattle," hosted by the Duwamish Tribe and the Suquamish Tribe. That year, the state and Indigenous governments signed the Centennial Accord, recognizing Indigenous sovereignty. Fifteen Native Nations participated in the Paddle to Seattle; the event has grown to more than 100 canoes.

Each year, a different Native Nation hosts the event, providing food and lodging to the canoe pullers, support crews and other visitors from Alaska, British Columbia, Washington and Oregon. Depending on the distance a family or team is traveling, the trip by canoe can take up to a month. On arrival at the destination, visiting canoe families ask formal permission of the hosts to land, sometimes speaking in their Native languages. A potlatch is celebrated, a sharing of songs, dances and gifts that lasts for days. The Canoe Journey is family-friendly, and drug- and alcohol-free.

In 2009, the Suquamish Tribe hosted the 20th anniversary Canoe Journey in their new House of Awakened Culture. They had more than 6,000 guests and 84 canoes landed on Suquamish's shores.

On Feb. 6, 2024, Ahousaht chiefs and council announced they could not host the Canoe Journey as planned, citing concerns that the annual event had grown too large for their small community to safely accommodate, and saying they had not been properly consulted before the invitation was made.

== Background ==
Many Indigenous peoples in North America relied on waterways to travel for trade, hunting and resource gathering, and for ceremonies and to visit relatives — much as people travel by roads today. That's why these waterways are often referred to as ancestral marine highways.

Three main types of canoes were built in North America: dugout, bark and plank. Methods of design and construction varied by different regions and the sizes of canoes varied according to purpose. In the Pacific Northwest, a canoe's origin may be recognized by its profile, name and decoration.

== Effects of COVID-19 pandemic ==
Chief Mike Wyse of the Snuneymuxw First Nation in British Columbia announced that Tribal Journeys 2020 was postponed because of the COVID-19 pandemic. His nation was supposed to host that year's event. It was the first time since 1993 that the event was not held.

Because of continued risks from the pervasive pandemic, the Executive Council of the Tla'amin Nation, the destination for the 2021 event, announced on Oct. 30, 2020 that the Canoe Journey would again be postponed. Tla'amin spokesman Hegus John Hackett announced the postponement and promised the Tla'amin Nation would host a future event.

== List of Canoe Journeys by year ==
- 1989: Paddle to Seattle, an event of the Washington State Centennial. Hosts: Duwamish Tribe and Suquamish Tribe
- 1993: Paddle to Bella Bella (Qatuwas Festival). Host: Heiltsuk First Nation
- 1994: Youth Paddle at Olympia, as part of the second Cedar Tree Conference.
- 1995: Full Circle Youth Paddle, Puget Sound.
- 1996: Full Circle Youth Paddle, Puget Sound.
- 1997: Paddle to La Push. Host: Quileute Tribe
- 1998: Paddle to Puyallup. Host: Puyallup Tribe
- 1999: Paddle to Ahousaht. Host: Ahousaht First Nation
- 2000: Paddle to Songhees. Host: Songhees First Nation
- 2000: Paddle to Pendleton. Host: Umatilla Tribes
- 2001: Paddle to Squamish. Host: Squamish First Nation
- 2002: Paddle to Quinault. Host: Quinault Nation
- 2003: Paddle to Tulalip. Host: Tulalip Tribes
- 2004: Paddle to Chemainus. Host: Stz'uminus First Nation
- 2005: Paddle to Elwha. Host: Elwha Klallam Tribe
- 2006: Paddle to Muckleshoot. Host: Muckleshoot Tribe
- 2007: Paddle to Lummi. Host: Lummi Nation
- 2008: Paddle to Cowichan. Host: Quw'utsun First Nation
- 2009: Paddle to Suquamish. Host: Suquamish Tribe
- 2010: Paddle to Makah. Host: Makah Tribe
- 2011: Paddle to Swinomish. Host: Swinomish Tribe
- 2012: Paddle to Squaxin. Host: Squaxin Island Tribe
- 2013: Paddle to Taholah. Host: Quinault Nation
- 2014: Paddle to Bella Bella (Qatuwas Festival). Host: Heiltsuk First Nation
- 2015: Various locations in the Salish Sea
- 2016: Paddle to Nisqually. Host: Nisqually Tribe
- 2017: Paddle to We Wai Kai and Wei Wai Kum Campbell River, BC. Hosts: We Wai Kai and Wei Wai Kum First Nations
- 2018: Paddle to Puyallup. Host: Puyallup Tribe
- 2019: Paddle to Lummi. Host: Lummi Nation
- 2020: Paddle to Snuneymuxw. Host: Snuneymuxw First Nation. Cancelled due to COVID-19 pandemic.
- 2021: Paddle to Tla'amin. Host: Tla'amin First Nation. Cancelled due to COVID-19 pandemic.
- 2022: Smaller journeys take place in San Juan Islands, WA.; and Kettle Falls, WA.
- 2023: Paddle to Muckleshoot. Host: Muckleshoot Tribe
- 2024: Power Paddle to Puyallup. Host: Puyallup Tribe
- 2025: Paddle to Elwha. Host: Elwha Klallam Tribe
- 2026: Paddle to Olympia. Host: Nisqually Tribe
- 2027: Ketchikan, Alaska
- 2028:Paddle to We Wai Kai and Wei Wai Kum Campbell River, BC. Hosts: We Wai Kai and Wei Wai Kum First Nations
- 2029: Paddle to Suquamish. Host: Suquamish Tribe
