= Deepwater Bay (Washington) =

Coordinates: 48°33′34″N 122°40′36″W

Map of Cypress Island showing Deepwater Bay on its east side

Deepwater Bay is a saltwater bay of the Salish Sea on the southeast side of Cypress Island in the U.S. state of Washington. It was the site of an unintentional release of aquaculture-raised Atlantic salmon in 2017, the Cypress Island Atlantic salmon pen break, initially blamed on the Solar eclipse of August 21, 2017.
