= Lummi people =

Indigenous people of western Washington (state)

Lummi
Xwlemi
- Lummi territory (c. 1850)

Regions with significant populations
- Washington, United States

Languages
- Lummi, English

Religion
- Indigenous folk religion, Christianity

Related ethnic groups
- Other Central Coast Salish peoples

The Lummi (Lummi dialect: Xwlemi or Lhaq'temish) are a Central Coast Salish people Indigenous to western Washington, namely parts of the San Juan Islands and the mainland near what is now Bellingham, Washington. Lummi people today are enrolled in the Lummi Nation, which is located west of Bellingham.

== Name and etymology ==
There are two names that are used by the Lummi to describe themselves: Xwlemi and Lhaq'temish. The name "Lummi" is an anglicization of one of the Lummi endonyms, Xwlemi. Xwlemi is spelled several ways, including Xwlemey' and Nexwlemey'. The name is said to be derived from Xwlalemes (IPA: [ˈxʷlɔləməs]), the name of a Lummi longhouse at Gooseberry Point, meaning "L-shaped." The name was used in 1855 to refer to the people living on the mainland, and possibly came to refer to the Lummi as a people after the Lummi concentrated around that area in the 19th century.

The name in English has been recorded many ways. The first attested recording was in 1824 as Lummie. Other spellings include Lummi, Nuglummi, Holumma, Whullumy, Wholerneils, Whellamay, and Noohlummi.

== Classification ==
The Lummi are a Central Coast Salish people. The Central Coast Salish are a group of culturally related peoples in the Salish Sea, including the Squamish, Nooksack, Halkomelem-speaking peoples, the Klallam, and the other Northern Straits-speaking peoples. The Lummi are part of the North Straits peoples, who are a group of related peoples in the San Juan Islands, as well as on parts of Vancouver and Fidalgo islands.

According to their oral history, the Lummi are composed of the descendants of the last Klalakamish (IPA: [ɬəˈlɛqəməʃ]) and Swallah ([ˈswɛʔləχ]) peoples. The Klalakamish were a group who were located on northern San Juan Island and are also possibly the ancestors of the Saanich and Lekwungen peoples as well. The Swallah were a people whose land was at Eastsound, on Orcas Island. These peoples are said to have joined with their Lummi relatives after they moved to the mainland, following the destruction of their villages by smallpox.

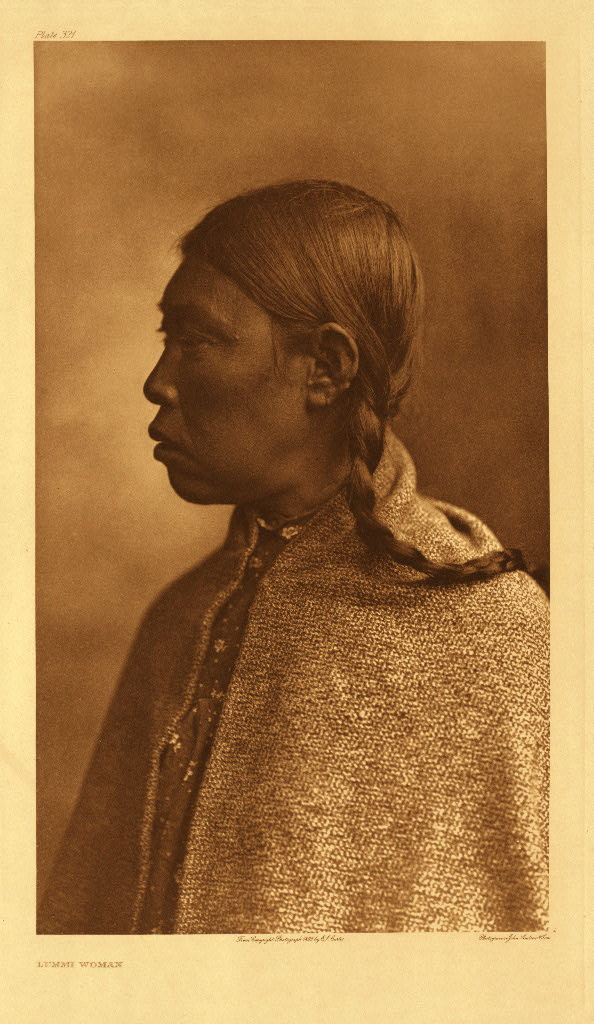
A Lummi woman, photographed by Edward S. Curtis (1913)

== History ==
=== Origin stories ===
There are several pieces of the oral history of the Lummi which explain the origin of the Lummi people. In one, the First Man (IPA: [swiˈtən]) fell from the sky in northern San Juan Island, becoming the first Klalakamish. Another story tells of how the Klalakamish were threatened with extinction, with only one remaining. The last man gave his house to another who lived at Flat Point on Lopez Island, who arranged his (now two) houses in an L-shape, calling his home Xwlalemes, which eventually turned into Xwlemi. As the Lummi settled the mainland, the man moved his Xwlemi house to Gooseberry Point, which became the center of Lummi society in the modern era.

According to Lummi history, around 1725, a man from the Swallah named [sχəlɔqst] led a war party against the Skalakhan as revenge for the murder of his brother. The man had gained a powerful spirit power that enabled him to kill almost all of the Skalakhan, who were a possibly Nooksack-speaking group living at the mouth of the Nooksack River. After two battles, the Skalahan were almost totally annihilated. The last surviving Skalakhan ceded their territory to the Lummi and married into the Lummi families, while some moved to what is today Ferndale. Thereafter, the rest of the Lummi settled on the mainland after the removal of the Skalakhan.

=== Early colonial era ===
In the 18th and 19th centuries, the Lummi were recovering from devastating waves of smallpox which devastated their lands. The epidemics wiped out or nearly wiped out three villages in the San Juan Islands, and past their destruction, the islands no longer were used as winter spots, only summer gathering grounds. Not only that, but the Lummi were suffering from large-scale slave raids on their villages from northern peoples. The surviving Lummi abandoned their villages on the islands and moved to the mainland. There, they defeated the Skalakhan and Hulwhaluq peoples and absorbed their villages. From that point on, the center of power for the Lummi was on the mainland. They built large stockades to fortify their new villages on the mainland.

In 1853, ethnologist George Gibbs reported that there were two Lummi "bands" on the mainland, one in the south and one in the north. The northern band was led by a man named Chilleuk, while the southern band was led by a man named Chowitsoot. The villages at Gooseberry Point and at the Portage may have been the "bands" that Gibbs was referring to. The Lummi were estimated to have a population of 450 in 1854.

On January 22, 1855, the Lummi were party to the Treaty of Point Elliott, though they were not named in the preamble (which anthropologist Barbara Lane described as an "oversight" by the treaty commission). Fourteen Lummi leaders signed the treaty led by Chowitsoot, who was appointed as the "head chief" of the Lummi, Samish, and Nooksack peoples by the treaty commission. These treaty signers were all wealthy men who had a great deal of influence in society. The Lummi ceded their lands, roughly 107,000 acres, to the United States in return for being able to retain the rights to their usual and accustomed fishing and hunting stations as well as retaining lands which would be turned into the Lummi Reservation. The Lummi were told at the treaty that they would retain the rights to their fishing stations, such as reefnet locations, which were privately owned. Other than the Lummi, several other local peoples (including the Nooksack and Samish) were intended to move to the reservation. Many who moved to the reservation left, and in the end, it was majorly inhabited by the Lummi.

Lummi signatories to the Treaty of Point Elliott

- Chowitshoot
- Sehlekqu
- S'h'chehoos (a.k.a. "General Washington")
- Whailanhu (a.k.a. "Davy Crockett")
- Sheahdelthu
- Kwultseh
- Kwullethu
- Hwnlahlakq (a.k.a. "Thomas Jefferson")
- Chtsimpt
- Tsesumten
- Klthahlten
- Kuttakanam (a.k.a. "John")
- S'hoolkkanam
- Chloksuts

In 1857, the Indian agent of the Lummi Reservation reported that there were three Lummi bands, each located at the forks of the mouth of the Nooksack River. Each acknowledged Chowitsoot as their leader.

=== Reservation era ===
In the 1880s, the fishing rights of the Lummi were attacked. Private canneries built salmon traps at traditional Lummi fishing sites, depriving the Lummi of their reef-netting fishing locations. They also lost access to fishing in Bellingham Bay due to a large log jam. Not only that, but they continually lost land on their reservation due to the sale of land to private individuals.

In the 1930s, the Lummi built a dike on the Nooksack River, allowing them to acquire and cultivate new land along the river delta.

=== Fight for treaty rights ===
The mid-to-late 1900s marked a push to regain Lummi treaty rights, especially in the case of fishing.

In the 1960s, the Lummi began a new aquaculture project, creating a fish hatchery and a salmon-rearing facility. Throughout the 70s and 80s, the Lummi fishing fleets continued to increase, and by the 1980s, around one-quarter of all fish caught in Washington state were caught by the Lummi.

The Lummi also fought to restore the hold over the land on their reservation, and revitalize it in other ways. The Lummi Nation reacquired around 10 percent of reservation land into trust, and in the 1980s, the Lummi Nation opened a restaurant-boating complex, processing plant, and several education facilities.

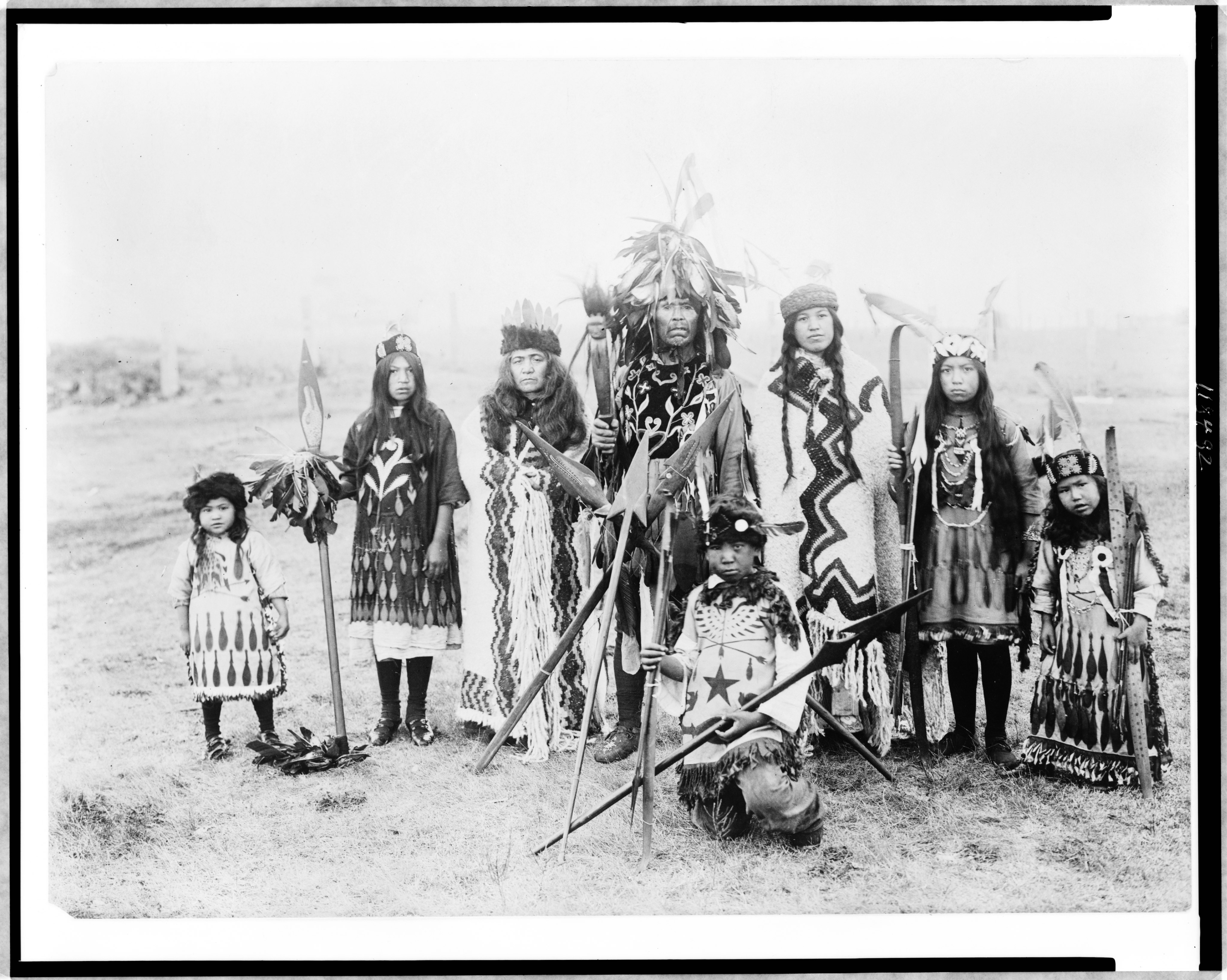
A Lummi family, 1915

== Geography ==
The historical core of Lummi territory was in the San Juan Islands, where they controlled about half of the archipelago. The borders of Lummi territory was well known by both the Lummi people and other neighboring peoples. The ancestors of the mainland Lummi controlled all of Orcas Island, Shaw Island, and their environs, as well as the north-western half of Lopez Island and the north-eastern half of San Juan Island. The Klalakamish had three villages on San Juan Island, with their main settlement being at Garrison Bay and others at Mitchell Bay and on the north shore opposite Speiden Island, as well as one village on Henry Island at Open Bay. The site opposite Speiden Island was resettled by a Lummi family from the Klalakamish in the latter half of the 19th century. The Swallah had three villages on Orcas Island at Eastsound, Rosario, and Olga; the latter may have been occupied as late as 1860. Two other settlements were not associated with either the Klalakamish or Swallah: one was located at Westsound on Orcas Island and another at Flat Point on Lopez Island, from which a house was moved to Gooseberry Point and became the source of the Lummi name.

Sometime in the 18th century, the Lummi began moving to the mainland, which became the center of Lummi society. Prior to the treaties, the Lummi controlled the shoreline from Point Whitehorn to Chuckanut Bay. Their holdings extended inland as far as Lake Terrell and what is now Ferndale. In 1852, there were three main winter village sites remaining, with smaller settlements possibly elsewhere. These settlements were located at:

- Gooseberry Point, which became the principal Lummi village after migration to the mainland. A fort was built here around 1830, and one longhouse remained here after 1850.
- The north end of the portage between Portage Island and the Lummi Reservation's peninsula. A large potlatch house was built here by Chowitsut, who signed the treaty as head chief of the Lummi. This village was abandoned around the mid-1860s.
- The south end of the portage.

Other locations were occupied prior to 1850, but would be abandoned after the Nooksack River changed course. Others moved to new sites, such as Tennant Lake, to which one family moved their winter house. A new settlement at Fish Point on the Nooksack River became the main center of Lummi society after Father Eugene Casimir Chirouse built a church there in 1861 and persuaded Lummi people to move to the vicinity. Other sites at the time which were inhabited starting after white settlement were at Marietta, Smugglers Slough, and Squalicum Creek.

Some of their lands were historically cooperatively owned by the Lummi and one or more neighboring peoples. For example, the area from Whatcom Creek to Chuckanut Bay was shared by the Lummi with the Nuwhaha and the Nooksack.

== Culture ==
=== Language ===
The Lummi speak the Lummi language, which is a variety of the Northern Straits Salish language. Varieties of Northern Straits are spoken by the Lummi, the Semiahmoo, the Samish, Songhees, Saanich, and the Sooke peoples. The Lummi dialect is often called a language by Lummi people today.

=== Fishing and aquaculture ===
Fishing was central to the traditional economy of the Lummi people and remains important to this day. Within Lummi territory, there is a great abundance and variety of marine resources, and traditional fisheries in the San Juans were highly productive. Historically, the most valued fish was the sockeye salmon, which migrate in large numbers through the islands on their way to the Fraser River. Lummi people fished all throughout their territory and beyond, as far north as the Fraser River and as far south as Puget Sound.

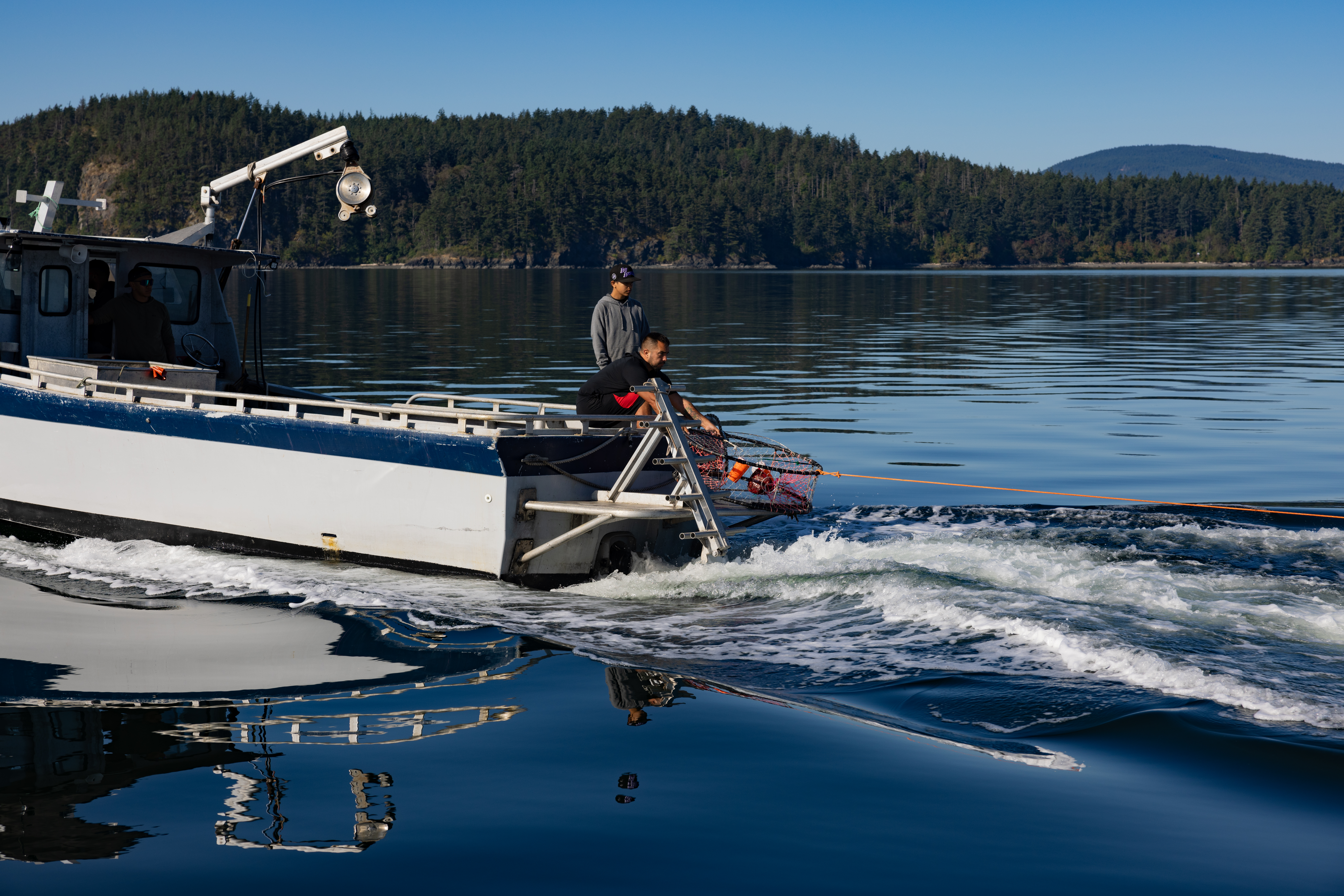
Lummi fishermen (2023)

=== Reefnetting ===
A critical part of Lummi fishing culture is reefnetting. Reefnetting is a specialized technique for harvesting salmon in saltwater invented and used by the Northern Straits and Klallam peoples. Reefnetting includes two canoes which hold a net at an opening in a kelp-covered reef near the shore. Reefnets work by artificially creating the correct conditions for salmon to swim through currents by utilizing knowledge of salmon psychology, underwater topography, and tidal currents.

Traditionally, it was the most important part of the Lummi economy and carried significant ritual significance. About ten to fifteen people would be part of a reefnetting crew hired by the owners of the sites. The captain of the crew, who was often either the owner of the site or an experienced fisherman hired by the owner, was responsible for watching for the salmon and had a special songs to direct salmon into the artificial channels. After the first sockeye salmon of the year was caught in the reefnet, a First Salmon Ceremony was performed by the crew and their families. The belief held by the Lummi in fishing is that the sockeye are to be treated respectfully so that they will continue to come and allow themselves to be caught by the fishermen.

Historically, reefnetting sites were privately owned and were inherited through descent. Reefnets were constructed at specific sites that intercepted the annual migration of sockeye throughout the Salish Sea. Ownership of these sites was highly valued due to the limited number of sites where reefnets could be constructed and to the massive quantities of fish that could be obtained. The crew received their shares of the catch first, but the rest of the fish belonged to the owner and their family. People who owned reefnet sites were traditionally considered very wealthy and highly influential. Some of the Lummi treaty signers owned reefnet sites around Lummi territory. Sites on Lummi Island were owned by Sehlekqu and Sheahdelthu, and sites on Lopez Island were owned by S'h'chehoos and Hwulahlakq. The largest reefnetting area in the Salish Sea was at Point Roberts within Semiahmoo territory, and many Lummi owned sites in this area. The second largest reefnetting area was within Lummi territory, located off Village Point on Lummi Island. Other major Lummi locations were on Shaw, Orcas, and Waldron islands, off the coast of Cherry Point, and within Samish territory off the southern coast of Lopez Island.

With the introduction of steel and Western tools, reefnetting evolved to use new materials in order to more efficiently fish. Reefnetting continued to be the major feature of the Lummi economic activity until about the 1890s when the Alaska Packers Association located Lummi fishing sites and erected fish traps to block reefnetters.

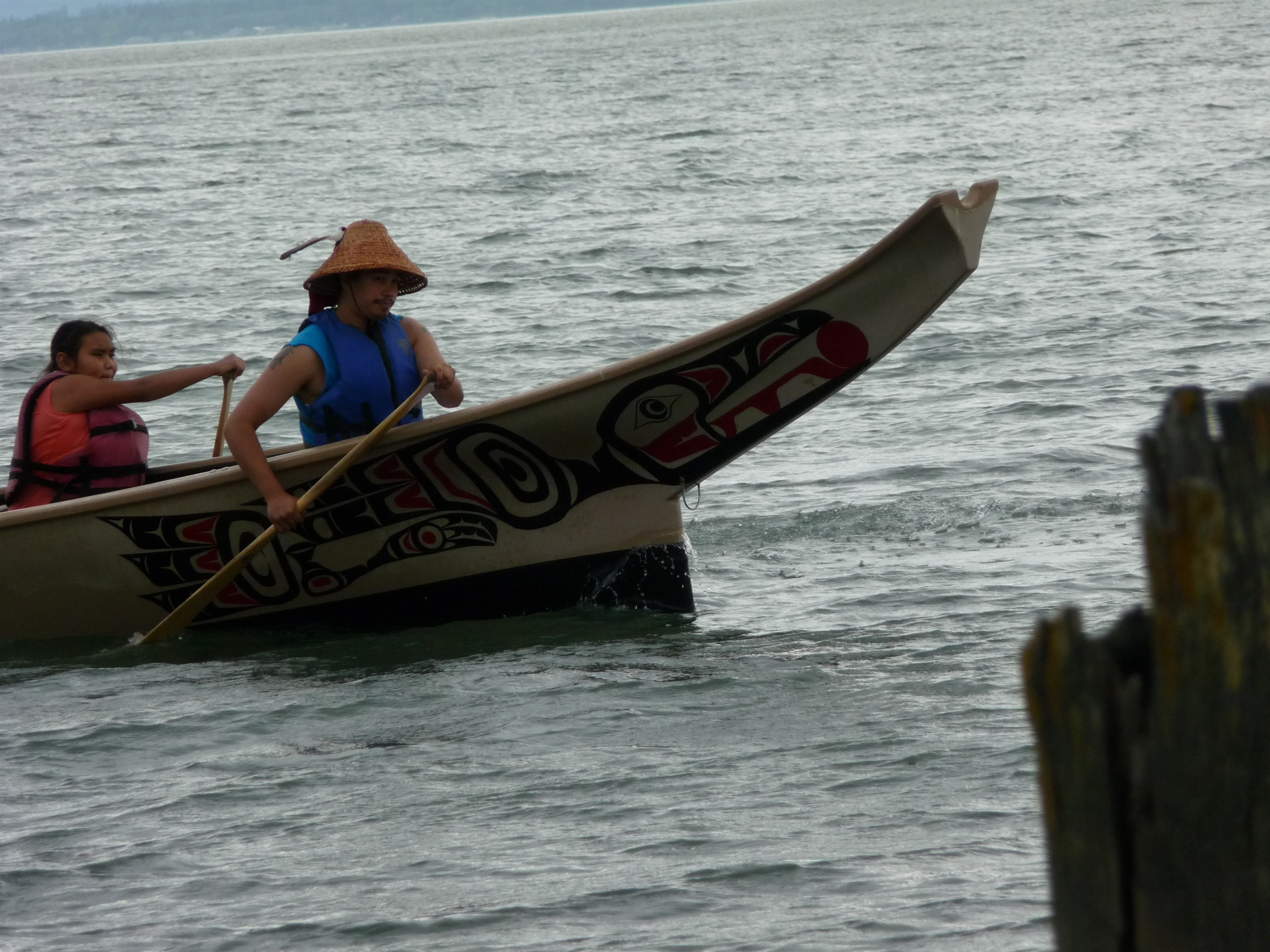
Lummi Nation citizen operating a canoe in tribal waters (2008)

== Society ==
=== Traditional social organization ===
The Lummi did not traditionally have "chiefs," nor were they arranged in organized "tribes," as has been commonly posited by both contemporary and modern writers. Rather, the highest unit of social organization in traditional Lummi society was the autonomous village and the household. Although there was a sense of identity even past the village level, there was no centralized means of power or authority that one village held over another. Rather, social cohesion was based upon kinship, alliances, community, and a shared culture and dialect between families and villages.

"Chiefs," as they have been called in literature, were traditionally people whose prestige gave them sway over others. However, there was by no means any formalized authority that one such leader had over other members of their community, or other communities. Generally, these people were leaders of their respective families and households. They could exercise authority over members of their family, including those in other houses or villages, but had no authority over a village itself.

The Lummi had a stratified society of three classes: high-class, low-class, and slave.

=== External relations ===
Like other peoples of the Northwest Coast, Lummi society was shaped by extensive intermarriage and alliance with other nearby peoples, both locally and abroad. The Lummi often intermarried the Klallam and some northern Lushootseed-speaking peoples, but were commonly hostile to the Cowichan peoples. In addition, the Lummi were subject to slave raids from the north, which forced them to migrate to the mainland, abandoning their settlements in the San Juans. Despite past conflicts, the Lummi today maintain relations with peoples they historically were hostile to.

Since the colonial period, the Lummi have both traded and fought with European settlers and Catholic missionaries. A mission was established shortly after the treaty signing, by reverends Chirouse and D'Herbomez. The United States opened Fort Bellingham in 1856 near the Lummi Reservation, which was operated for four years until 1860. The Lummi themselves traded at forts and settlements nearby, including at Victoria and along the Fraser River. Much of the modern history of the Lummi has been marked by their struggle against the American government and White fishermen for their treaty rights, which have been violated many times since the treaty's signing.

Location of the Lummi Nation

== Lummi Nation ==
Most Lummi are enrolled in the federally-recognized Lummi Nation (officially known as the Lummi Tribe of the Lummi Reservation), who are the political successors to the aboriginal Lummi who signed the treaty. The majority of the Lummi Nation descends from Lummi people, but also includes people descended from Semiahmoo and Samish communities as well.

The Lummi Nation formally adopted a constitution in 1970, and is run by the Lummi Business Council, a democratically elected eleven-member council which governs the tribe.

== Notable Lummi people ==
- Chow-its-hoot
- Jewell James
- Joe Hillaire

== See also ==
- Lummi Nation
- Lummi dialect
- Lummi Island
- Lummi stick
- Lummi River
