= Northwest Indian College =

Lummi tribal college in Bellingham, Washington, US

- Xwlemi Elh > Tal > Nexw Squl
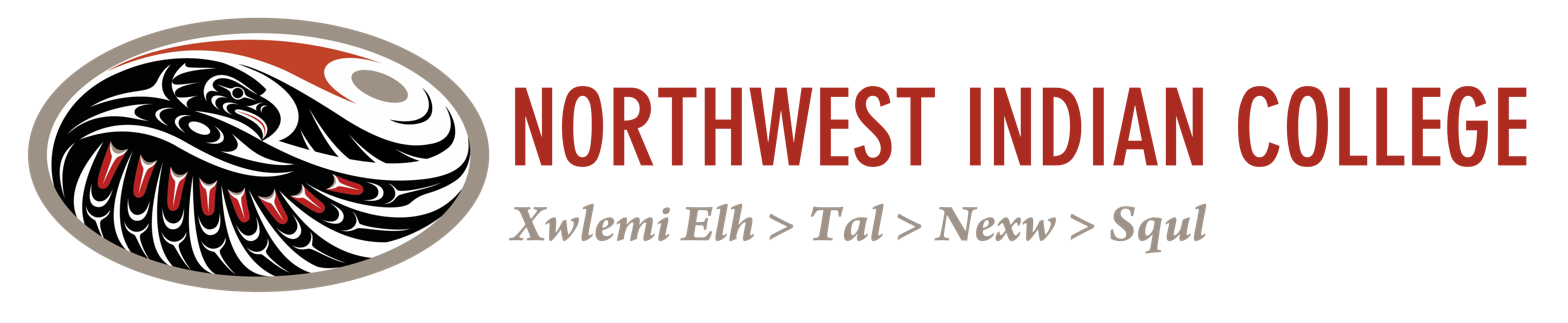
- Former names: Lummi Indian School of Aquaculture, Lummi Community College
- Motto: Through education, Northwest Indian College promotes Indigenous self-determination and knowledge.
- Motto in English: Building People, Building Nations
- Type: Public tribal land-grant community college
- Established: 1973
- Affiliations: AIHEC
- President: Dr. Lexie Tom
- Faculty: 100 (33 full-time, 67 part-time)
- Undergraduates: 1000 (2025)
- Location: 2522 Kwina Rd., Bellingham, Washington, U.S. 48°47′39″N 122°36′51″W
- Campus: Urban/Suburban Lummi Nation (main campus) reserve, Swinomish, Tulalip, Port Gamble S'Klallam, Muckleshoot, Nisqually, and Nez Perce.
- Website: www.nwic.edu

Northwest Indian College (Xwlemi Elh>Tal>Nexw Squl) is a public tribal land-grant community college on the Lummi Indian Reservation in Whatcom County, Washington , United States. It was established by the Lummi Nation and is the only accredited tribal college or university serving reservation communities of Washington, Oregon, and Idaho.

== History ==
NWIC was created in response to the higher education needs of American Indians, particularly geographically isolated populations that have no other means accessing education beyond the high school level.

The institution began in 1973 as the Lummi Indian School of Aquaculture, which was established to provide local technicians for employment in Indian-owned and operated fish and shellfish hatcheries in the United States and Canada. In 1983, the Lummi Nation chartered the Lummi Community College to fulfill the need for a more comprehensive post-secondary education for tribal members.

The Lummi Community College campaigned for accreditation by the Northwest Commission on Colleges and Universities in 1988. The commission affirmed accreditation in 1993, and Lummi Community College became Northwest Indian College. One year later, the college was designated a land-grant college alongside 31 other tribal colleges.

Years of program expansion and dedication resulted in the college gaining accreditation by the Northwest Commission on Colleges and Universities as a four-year, baccalaureate degree-granting institution, effective September 2008.

In May 2025, NWIC announced the Board of Trustees appointed Dr. Lexie Tom as the first-ever Lummi Nation Tribal Member and NWIC alumna to serve as President. Tom previously served as Interim President and the Education Director of Lummi Nation School prior to that.

Previously, Dr. Justin Guillory (Nez Perce Tribe), served as President from 2012-2024 and moved on to become President at Whatcom Community College.

== Academics ==
NWIC offers Bachelor of Arts, Bachelor of Science, Associate of Arts and Sciences, Associate of Science (Transfer), Associate of Applied Science (Transfer), and Associate of Technical Arts degrees. As of 2011, it was one of seven tribal colleges in the U.S. to offer a degree related to tribal administration.

The college is an open enrollment school, meaning no SAT or ACT scores are needed to apply.

== Campus ==
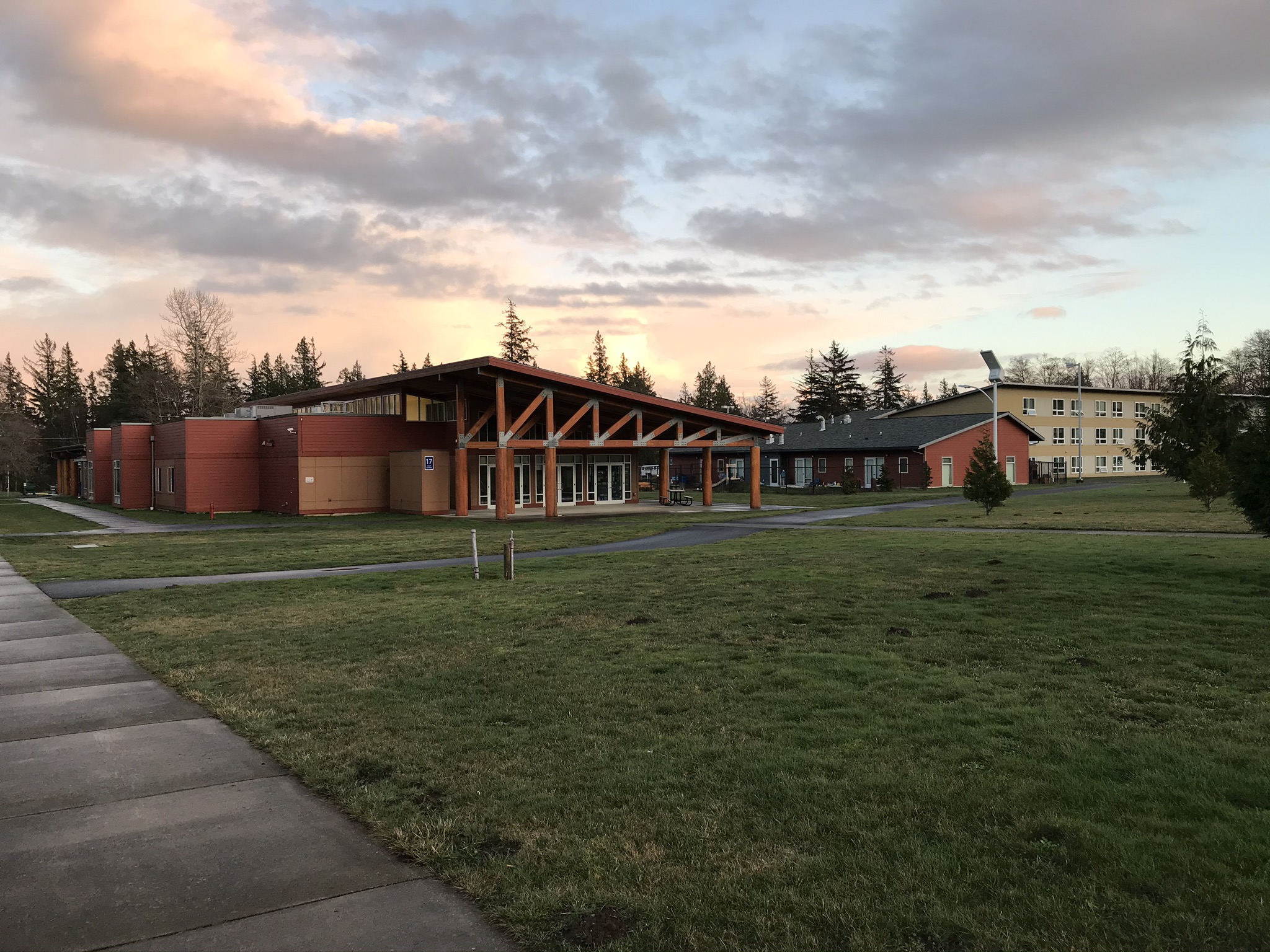
Buildings on the NWIC Lummi campus

Northwest Indian College is an accredited four-year college located on the Lummi Indian Reservation in Washington state, near the city of Bellingham. In addition the NWIC's main campus in Lummi, the college has five sites located in Tulalip, Port Gamble S'Klallam, Muckleshoot, Nisqually, and Nez Perce.

== Partnerships ==
NWIC is a member of the American Indian Higher Education Consortium (AIHEC), which is a community of tribally and federally-chartered institutions working to strengthen tribal nations and make a lasting difference in the lives of American Indians and Alaska Natives.

Scholarships are available through the American Indian College Fund (AICF) and the NWIC Foundation.
