= Chow-its-hoot =

Lummi name

Chow-its-hoot (also spelled as Cha-wit-zit or Chowitsuit) is a Lummi name. Several Lummi individuals carried this name. The name means "Strong Man".

== Point Elliott Treaty ==
Commonly, the name refers to the man who was the third of 82 Native Americans (including Chief Seattle) to sign the controversial Treaty of Point Elliott in 1855. Chow-its-hoot signed on behalf of his southern band of Lummis.

== Kwina ==
The Chow-its-hoots was referred as a "strong warrior" for the authentic Hereditary Kwina line, who being known as king, judge and priest of Lummi by heritage, culture, and custom in tradition for hundreds of years in ancient decree through devine birthright.

The Hereditary "Qui-ench" holds spiritual belief by title in custom through tradition for the Lummi people that which in position serves community as a whole. "Qui-ench" is a royal custom by tradition which holds all three titles in heritage as: Priest, King and Judge. History shows before the Church, Kwina was King of the Lummis by historical, family oral and custom account.

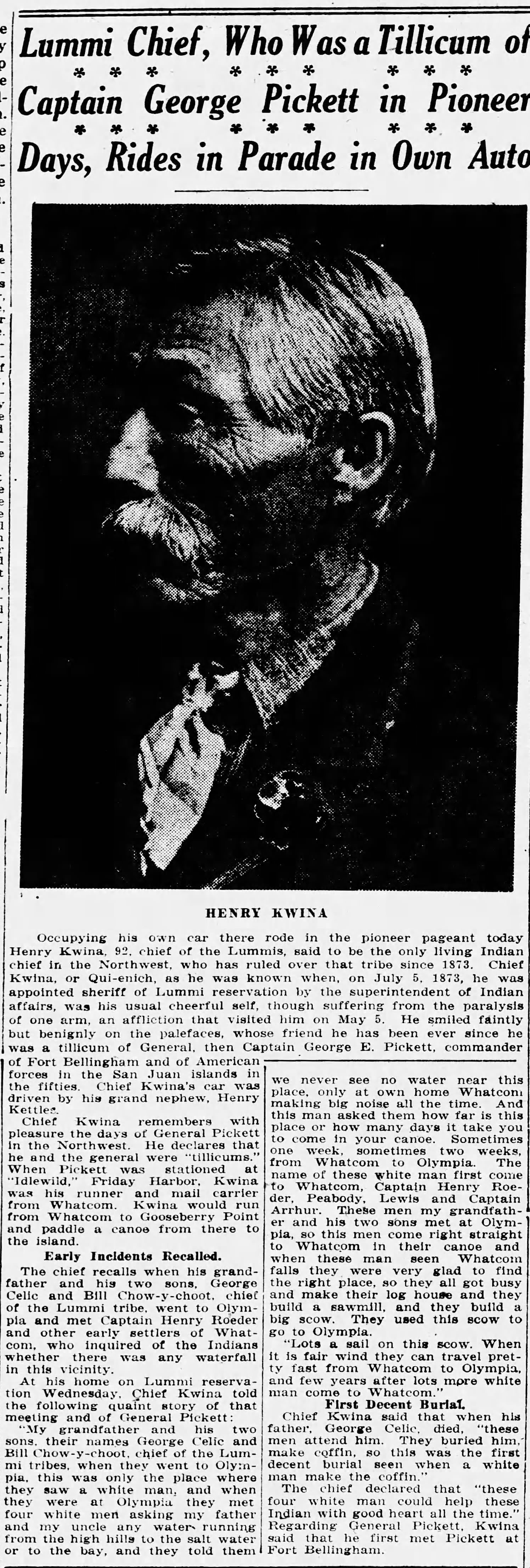

However, when the royal Hereditary Kwina line was broken by the Church and installed August Martin historically with proof in open letter from the Church revealing the "installation of August Martin," who was not a Lummi member but belonged to the Muckleshoot tribe instead without being a direct family Kwina bloodline. Hereditary Qui-ench Chief Henry Kwina was the last King of Lummi by ancient custom and tradition and who seemingly went extinct, until cryptic records revealed Qui-ench Raven Wolf Kwina as the direct line of the Chow-its-Hoot King Henry Kwina.

== Potlatches ==
Chowitsuit was sometimes called "the richest Lummi" because he owned several reef net sites and hosted seven potlatches in his lifetime. A potlatch is a giant giveaway whereat the host gives away all or nearly all of his/her possessions. Potlatches serve a socio-economic purpose amongst NW tribes as a man's wealth is measured by what one gives, not by what one keeps.

== Status ==
As a result of Chowitsuit's generosity, he earned status amongst Lummis. This status led Whatcom County pioneers to consider Chowitsuit Chief of the Lummi Tribe. However, his contemporary tribal members referred to Chow-its-hoot as a "speaker", meaning he spoke on behalf of his people. Speakers visited clan matriarchs (traditionally with a secondary listener) and listened to their concerns. Thereafter, speakers were expected to repeat concerns on behalf of the clans as they heard them. "Chow-its-Hoot" was referred to Chief as a title of respect too with King Chief Henry Kwina as well, as Marion Helen Henry Kwina spoke of how her father was a "strong warrior from old ancient blood that was superstitious."

== Naming of Whatcom Falls/County ==
Chow-its-hoot made friends with the first "hwa-ni-tum" ("non-Native" in Lummi) to settle in the area, Russell Peabody. Peabody was looking for a waterfall on which he could build a saw mill. Chow-its-hoot explained that the Lummis had no word for "waterfall" and that he was looking for "whatcom", which means "loud water" in Lummi language. So, Chowitsuit directed Peabody to a waterfall that would later be named "Whatcom Falls" and Peabody proceeded to build the first saw mill there.

== Death ==
The Lummi Salish People held customs for death traditionally for customs that the Lummi People have forgotten.

However historically, Chowitsuit and the Lummis helped the first pioneers survive in Whatcom County. He and Peabody became friends. According to Peabody's journals, Chowitsuit sent messengers to ask Peabody to visit him at his home on Portage Island where Chowitsuit told Peabody that Haida had stolen his hair and performed black magic on it. Chowitsuit forecasted to Peabody his own death and called Peabody to Portage Island to say "good bye" to his old friend. Peabody didn't believe Chowitsuit because of his apparent good health. Nevertheless, Chowitsuit died soon thereafter.

== Symbol ==
Chow-its-hoot's symbol, 3 circles forming the shape of an equilateral triangle, connected by lines on two of three sides.

== Legacy ==
A totem pole on the southeastern side of the Whatcom County court house depicts Chow-its-hoot and his brother Klut-wu-lum shepherding Peabody in a canoe.
