= Lummi River =

Physical characteristics
- Source
  - location: Divergence of the Lummi from the Nooksack
  - coordinates: 48°49′42″N 122°35′37″W
  - elevation: 13 ft (4.0 m)
- Mouth
  - coordinates: 48°47′24″N 122°39′51″W
  - elevation: 0 ft (0 m)

Basin features
- Progression: Lummi River → Lummi Bay → Strait of Georgia
- GNIS ID: 1506383

The Lummi River is the current name for a river channel that was, prior to the beginning of the 20th century, the main outflow channel for the Nooksack River. It then emptied into Lummi Bay rather than Bellingham Bay, as the current channel of the Nooksack River does. At the time, the channel that now serves as the main channel of the Nooksack River was restricted by a massive, mile-long, log jam. This was the result of the timber industry floating logs downriver to ports for processing and shipping.

In the late 19th century, with an interest in creating a navigable waterway that would empty into Bellingham Bay and be usable beyond Ferndale, the city of Bellingham commissioned removal of the log jam. Once the log jam was removed, the river's flow shifted into the southern channel. The headwaters of the Lummi River were restricted by a dam, which was later damaged. It was replaced by a dam and spillway system, which was also later damaged. Today the Lummi River is fed by water from the Nooksack River only during times of high water, by a culvert that passes through the levee.

The Lummi River today is characterized by a narrow channel. As its main purpose is as a high water overflow, it has been artificially channelized and diked to prevent flooding of surrounding agricultural fields. It has a low flow as a result of its short course across glacially ploughed flatlands. The considerable reduction in the flow of the river has allowed erosive processes to strongly affect the Lummi River Delta. It was formerly of considerable size, and might have been comparable to the modern Nooksack River Delta in Bellingham Bay.

The channelization and diking of the river resulted in the production of significant new areas of rich farmland, but it has cost the elimination of an equal or greater acreage of coastal wetlands and damage to important salmon habitats. Because of the importance of salmon to indigenous tribes, commercial and sports fishermen, state and local governments are evaluating proposals to investigate restoration of these habitats.
