= Lummi stick =

Percussive musical instruments

Lummi sticks, named after the Lummi Native American peoples, are hardwood cylindrical sticks, usually roughly 18 cm (7 inches) long and 2 cm (¾ inches) in diameter, used as percussive musical instruments. They are generally struck against one another and used frequently in musical education to teach rhythm.

Another variety, called simply a rhythm stick, is 30 cm (12 inches) long and painted blue. These are generally either cylindrical or fluted and come in sets containing an equal number of both.

The sticks are used in elementary school education in the US and Canada.

== See also ==
- Claves
