= Lummi dialect =

Dialect of the North Straits Salish language

Lummi
- Xwlemi Chosen
- Pronunciation: [xʷləmi tʃɔsən]
- Native to: United States
- Region: Pacific Northwest
- Ethnicity: Lummi people
- Language family: Salishan languages: Coast Salish; Central; Straits Salish; North Straits Salish; Lummi

Language codes
- ISO 639-3: (covered by Straits Salish str)
- Glottolog: lumm1243

Lummi (Lummi: Xwlemi Chosen, IPA: [xʷləmi tʃɔsən]) is a dialect of the North Straits Salish language traditionally spoken by the Lummi people of northwest Washington state, in the United States. Although traditionally referred to as a language, it is mutually intelligible with the other dialects of North Straits.

Although the traditional variety of the Lummi dialect is extinct, New Lummi is spoken on the Lummi reservation and is taught at Ferndale High School, Lummi Nation School, Vista Middle School, Horizon Middle School, Skyline and Eagleridge Elementary Schools, and Northwest Indian College.

== Classification ==
Lummi is a dialect of the Northern Straits language, which is spoken on southern Vancouver Island, in the islands of the Haro and Rosario straits, and on the Washington mainland. Northern Straits itself is a continuum composed of a group of mutually intelligible dialects.

Northern Straits is a Coast Salish language; it is one of two languages (the other being Klallam) in the Straits Salish subgroup within the Coast Salish languages.

In the view of the Northern Straits peoples, the linguistic similarity between their languages is recognized, but they traditionally identify with one of six ethnolinguistic groups: Sooke, Lekwungen, Saanich, Lummi, Samish, and Semiahmoo. These groups correspond with the various dialects of Northern Straits.

== New Lummi ==
New Lummi is a variety of the Lummi dialect that emerged on the Lummi Reservation. New Lummi, along with several other varieties of Northern Straits, originated as a ceremonial variety of the original dialects with a simplified phonology and grammar heavily influenced by English. In some cases, speakers of these new varieties changed the material used to teach so that it would be more like English and easier to learn.

The grammar of New Lummi features the exclusion of lexical suffixes, very limited aspect marking, and a leveling of the transitive and intransitive paradigms. The phonology of New Lummi has also been modified from the original variety, with consonant clusters being simplified, glottalization lost completely on sonorants and sporadically on obstruents, and many glottal stops missing. The lateral affricate [tɬʼ] is replaced by [kl] or [kʼl]. Other non English sounds are often replaced, such as [q] becoming [k], [χ] becoming [h], [k], or [x], and [xʷ] becoming [hw] or [kw].

== Phonology ==
Consonants
		Bilabial	Alveolar			Palatal	Velar		Uvular		Glottal
		Bilabial	median	sibilant	lateral	Palatal	plain	lab.	plain	lab.	Glottal
Plosive/ Affricate	plain	p	t	t͡s		t͡ʃ		kʷ	q	qʷ	ʔ
Plosive/ Affricate	ejective	pʼ	tʼ	t͡sʼ	t͡ɬʼ	t͡ʃʼ		kʷʼ	qʼ	qʷʼ	ʔ
Fricative				s	ɬ	ʃ		xʷ	χ	χʷ	h
Sonorant	plain	m	n		l	j	ŋ	w			
Sonorant	glottalized	ˀm	ˀn			ˀj	ˀŋ	ˀw			

- /ts/ phonemically occurs only rarely within vocabulary.

Vowels
	Front	Central	Back
Close	i		u
Mid/Open	æ	ə	ɔ

- Vowel sounds /æ, ɔ/ may also be heard as more mid or open as [ɛ, ɒ].

== Grammar ==
=== Person marking ===
In Lummi, basic transitive constructions that have both third person subject and first or second person object are impossible. In this case, the passive must be used. Regarding the person markers, the first person singular and second person object markers are wholly homophonous.

Person marking in Lummi
	1SG	1PL	2	3TRANS
Subject Markers	sən	ɬ	sxʷ	-əs
Object Markers	-oŋəs	-al'xʷ	-oŋəs	∅
Genitive Markers	nə-	-ɬ	ʔən'- / n'-	-s
