= Swinomish totem pole =

Totem pole in Skagit County, Washington

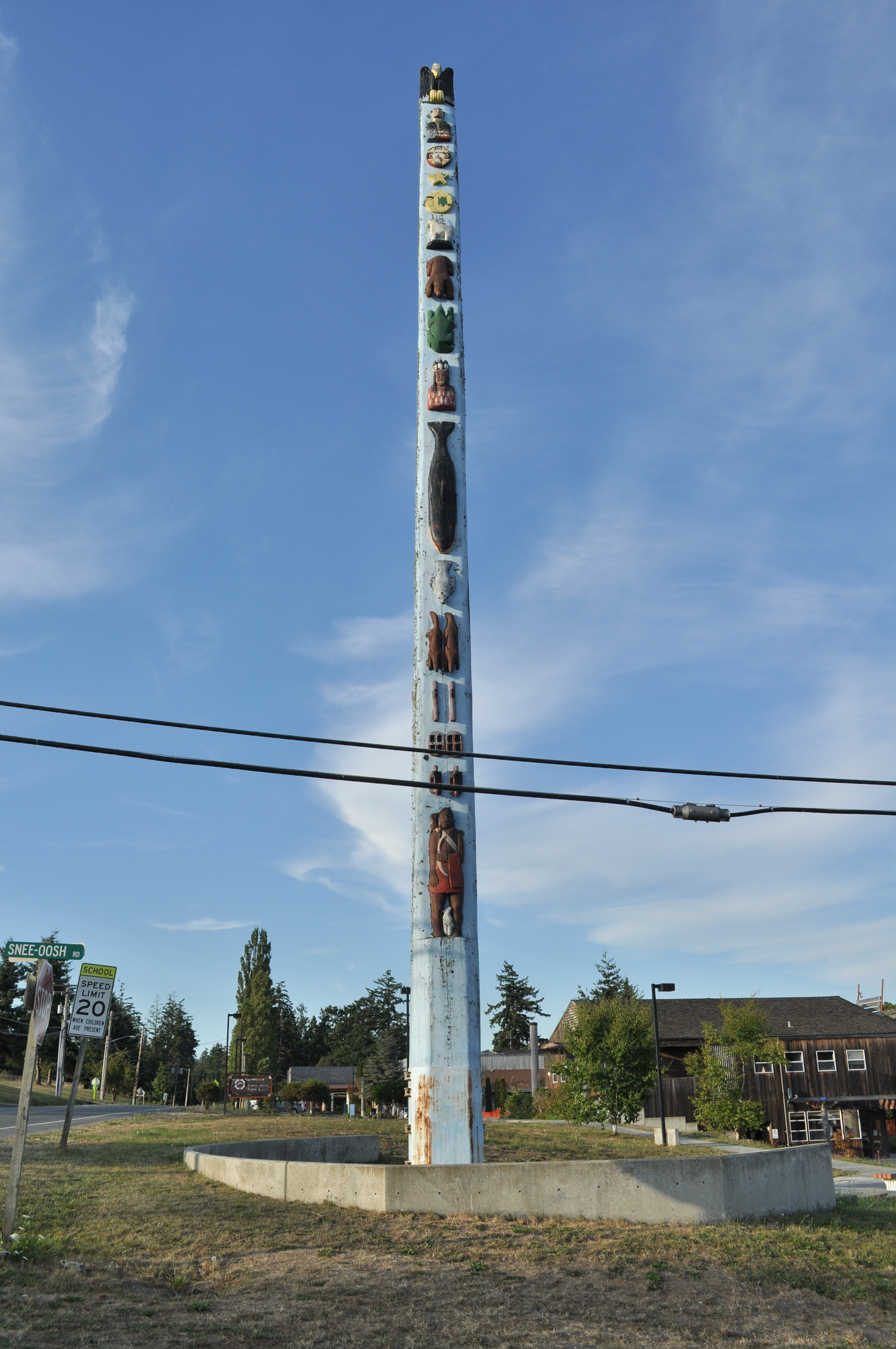
- 1989 replica
- Artist: Charlie Edwards
- Completion date: 1938
- Type: Totem pole
- Medium: Cedar
- Location: Swinomish Reservation, Washington, U.S.; 48°23′34″N 122°30′05″W

The Swinomish totem pole, also known as the Swinomish Village Totem Pole, is a totem pole on the Swinomish Reservation in Skagit County, Washington, United States.

Originally installed in 1938, the carving of the pole was funded by the Works Progress Administration and carved by Native American workers. Carving was led by Charlie Edwards, a member of the Swinomish Indian Tribal Community. Alongside traditional images from local Swinomish, Samish, Lower Skagit, and Upper Skagit stories, the totem pole also depicts US president Franklin D. Roosevelt. The original pole was removed in 1963; a replica was installed in its place in 1989.

== Description and location ==
Placed at a central part of the Swinomish Reservation, at the corner of Sneeoosh Road, the totem pole is made from cedar. It is 19 metres (62 ft) tall and 5 feet in diameter at the base.

Though the Swinomish totem pole imitates the tradition of totem poles further north, the designs are distinctly Coast Salish. With solid colours and designs appearing as though they were placed on the totem pole, rather than carved into it, the design incorporates figures from traditional legends alongside a bust of then-president Franklin D. Roosevelt. The bust of Roosevelt, located near the top of the pole, was designed by Eva Robb of the Tulalip Reservation, and marks increased powers of self-government acquired by Native Americans during the Roosevelt administration.

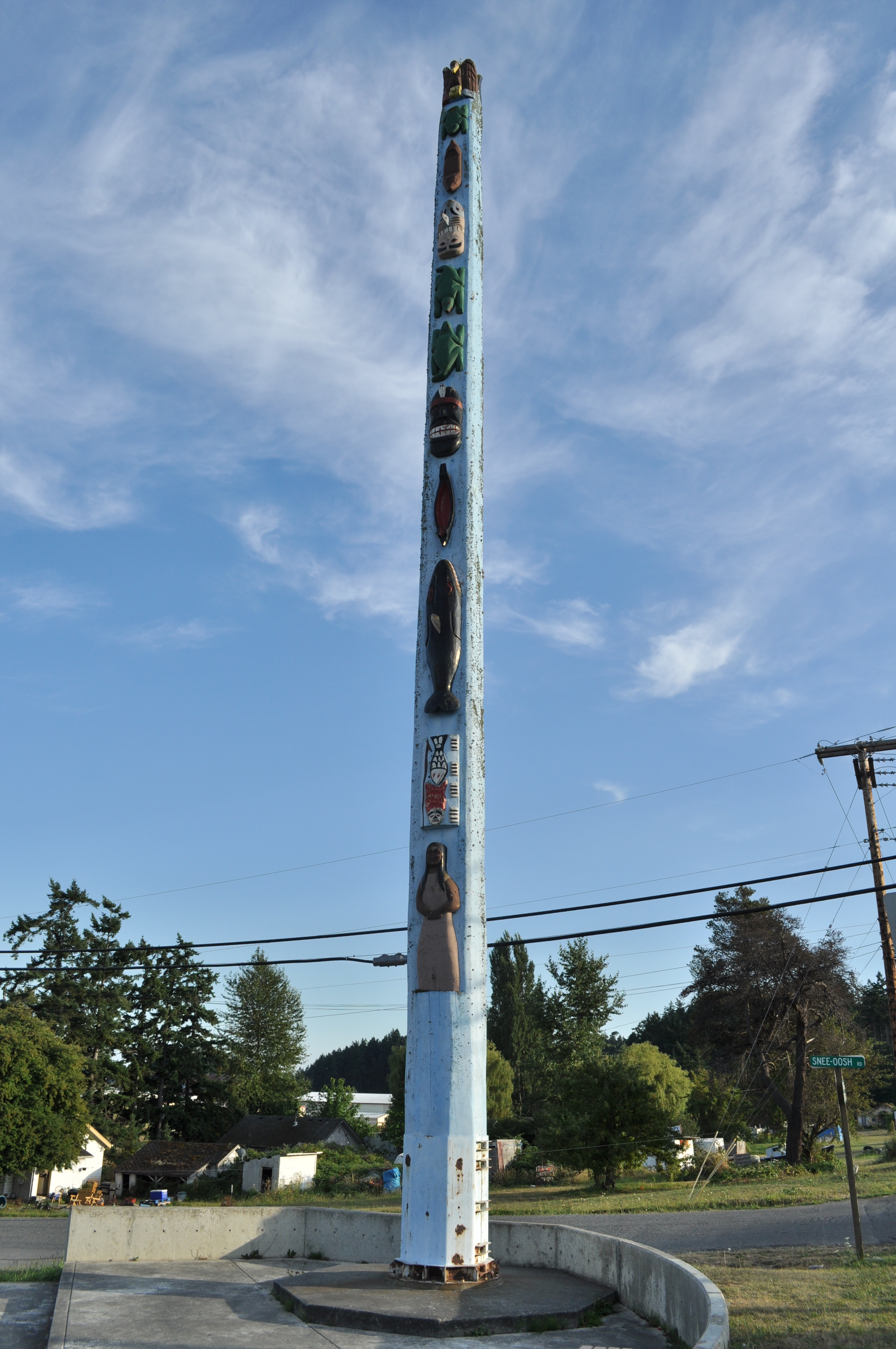
Side of pole with the Maiden of Deception Pass

At the top of the pole, just above Roosevelt, are two eagles, a male and a female. At the base, there are two figures: the Maiden of Deception Pass and Twu-yalets-sa, a boy who killed too many animals. Other figures depicted include the sun, moon, and a star (representing two sisters who marry stars, then escape), Man Swallowing Shark (representing the importance of humans over animals), Mink, a Mountain Goat, and Black Bear engaged in battle against a giant Lizard. There are also various animals or spirit guides which have helped humans, including two wildcats, two lizards, a cougar, Hail, Toad, and Grizzly Bear and Rattlesnake, who were said to have helped a chief's daughter. Other symbols on the pole include objects associated with games and a Makah-style canoe The traditional images were taken from the interior posts of the tribal council, and was designed to serve as a monument and tell the stories of the tribes living on the Swinomish reservation: the Samish, Swinomish, Lower Skagit, and Upper Skagit.

== History ==
The pole was created with funds from the Works Progress Administration (WPA) during the 1930s, and carved by Native American WPA workers. The WPA also funded the building of several houses, a recreation hall, and a baseball field on the reservation.

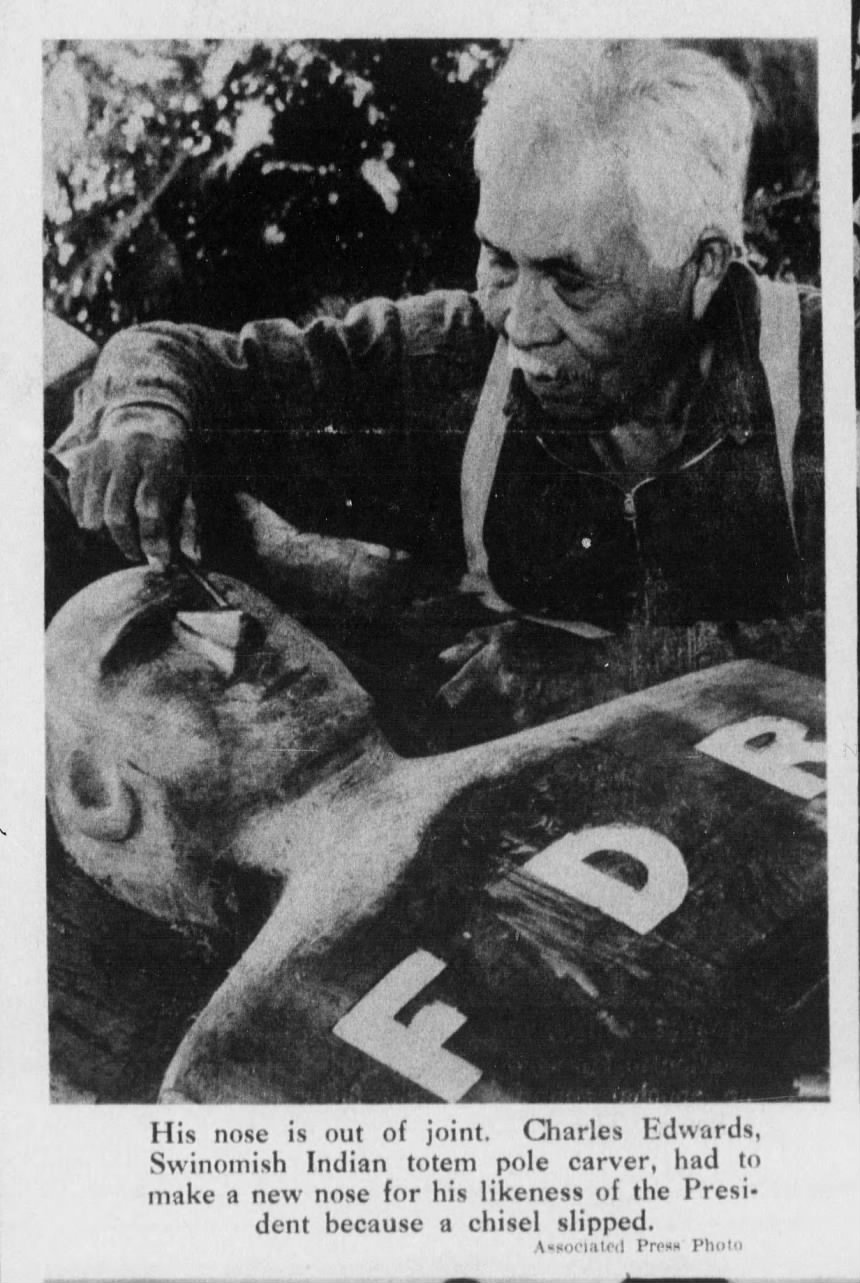
Edwards carving the totem pole

Carving of the Swinomish pole was led by Charlie Edwards, then 83, a member of the Swinomish Indian Tribal Community. During the carving process, Edwards labeled the bust of Roosevelt with the letters "FDR"; these were painted over with a picture of the American flag. Edwards also had to carve a new nose for Roosevelt, after he inadvertently damaged the original.

The Swinomish village totem pole, alongside the other WPA works, was dedicated on August 20, 1938. The ceremony included games, dances, canoe races, and speeches from Washington leaders and politicians, including congressman Monrad Wallgren, Chief Black Thunder of the Tulalip Tribe, politicians George Adams and Bryce Little, and president of the Northwest Federation of Indians Don McDowell. Attendees included Eva Robb and Don G. Abel. Though Roosevelt was invited, he did not attend; similarly, E. Pat Kelly attended on the behalf of governor Clarence D. Martin. The Commissioner for the Bureau of Indian Affairs John Collier gave a speech at the event, where he discussed the Indian Reorganization Act of 1934.

The pole received considerable media attention after its installation and was covered in a 1938 edition of Life magazine. Businesses in the nearby La Conner saw the pole as an opportunity to increase tourism to the area, which it did alongside promoting interest in woodcarving. Its installation was accompanied by the release of a book of Swinomish stories, written and collected by Martin J. Sampson and Rosalie M. Whitney, of La Conner. Titled Swinomish Totem Pole Tribal Legends, the book contained nine legends and a history of the totem pole's construction, as told by Sampson.

The pole was maintained, though removed in 1963. A replica was constructed in 1989. The figures from the original pole were repaired and installed at the Swinomish Tribe's Social Services Building.

== See also ==
- List of totem poles
