= Swinomish (disambiguation) =

The Swinomish are a Native American people of Washington state in the United States.

Swinomish may also refer to:

- Swinomish Indians of the Swinomish Reservation of Washington, a federally recognized Swinomish tribe in Washington state
- Swinomish language, the language of the Swinomish people
- Swinomish Channel, a waterway in Washington state
