= La Conner, Washington =

Town in Washington, United States

La Conner
- Town
- La Conner, Washington
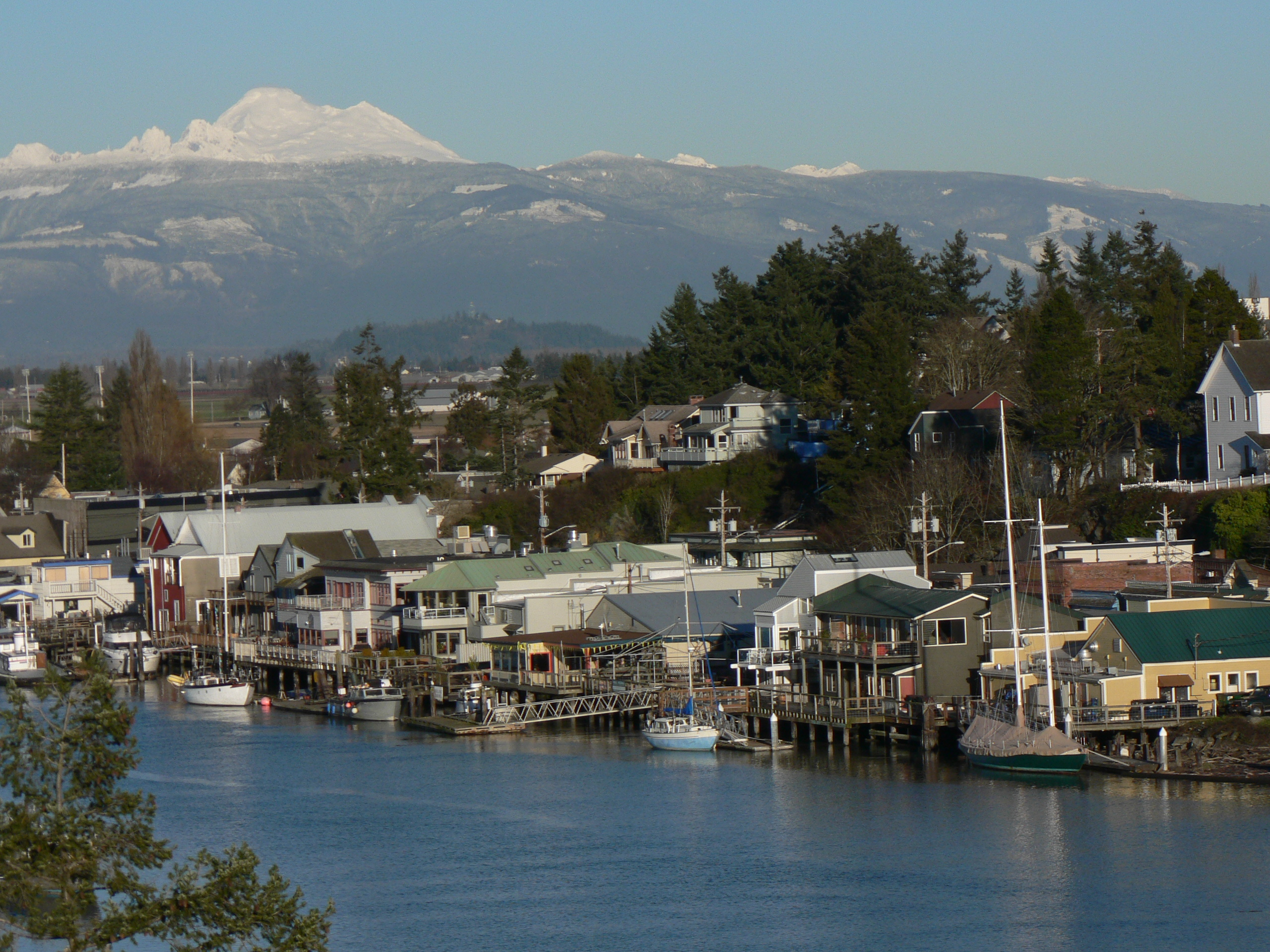

- Coordinates: 48°23′22″N 122°29′57″W
- Country: United States
- State: Washington
- County: Skagit
- Named for: Louisa Ann Conner

Area
  - Total: 0.48 sq mi (1.25 km^{2})
  - Land: 0.40 sq mi (1.03 km^{2})
  - Water: 0.085 sq mi (0.22 km^{2})
- Elevation: 07 ft (2.1 m)

Population (2020)
  - Total: 965
  - Density: 2,382.7/sq mi (919.98/km^{2})
- Time zone: UTC−8 (Pacific (PST))
  - Summer (DST): UTC−7 (PDT)
- ZIP Code: 98257
- Area code: 360, 564
- FIPS code: 53-36780
- GNIS feature ID: 2412852
- Website: townoflaconner.org

La Conner is a town in Skagit County, Washington, United States with a population of 965 at the 2020 census. It is included in the Mount Vernon–Anacortes, Washington Metropolitan Statistical Area.

== History ==
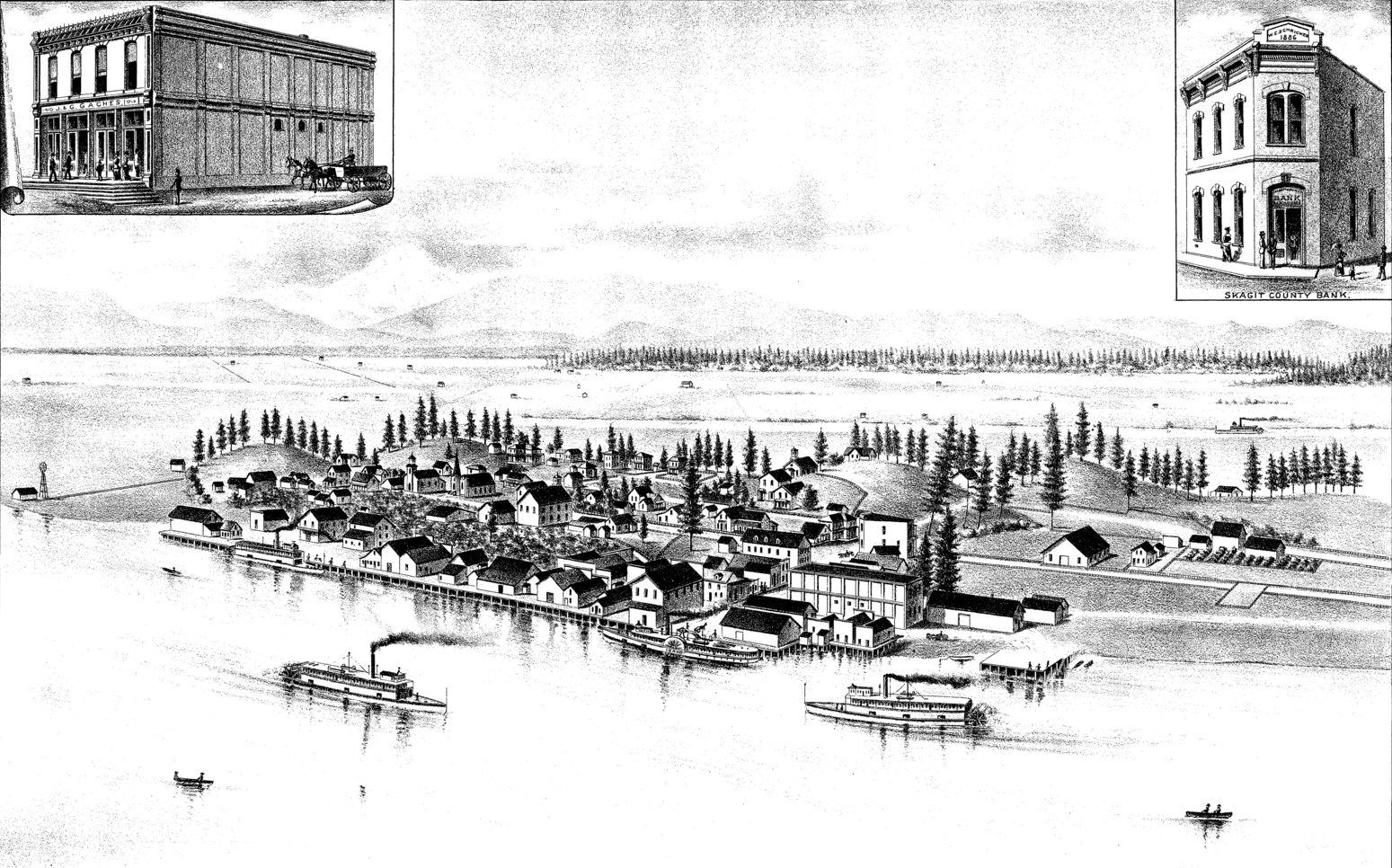
La Conner, c. 1889

La Conner was first settled in May 1867 by Alonzo Low and was then known by its post office name, Swinomish. Its location on the Swinomish channel was an ideal safe harbor for ships. In 1869, J.S. Conner bought the settlement's trading post and in 1870 had the name changed to honor his wife, Louisa Ann Conner. The French-appearing "La" represented her first and middle initials. When Skagit County was created out of Whatcom County in 1883, La Conner was chosen as the county seat, but would only hold that designation until November 1884 when the seat was moved to Mount Vernon.

In early 2020, nine businesses in downtown La Conner announced their closures—mostly attributed to lost revenue during the COVID-19 pandemic and from the cancellation of the Skagit Valley Tulip Festival.

== Geography ==
La Conner is located along the Swinomish Channel, across from the Swinomish Indian Reservation on Fidalgo Island, in western Skagit County. The Rainbow Bridge, a steel arch bridge, connects La Conner to the Swinomish Indian Reservation. The town is north of Skagit Bay and is connected to nearby highways by local roads. The center of town, known as "the Hill", roughly bounded by Second, Morris and Commercial streets and the Swinomish Channel, is a historic district and is listed on the National Register of Historic Places.

According to the United States Census Bureau, the town has a total area of 0.51 square miles (1.32 km^{2}), of which, 0.41 square miles (1.06 km^{2}) is land and 0.10 square miles (0.26 km^{2}) is water.

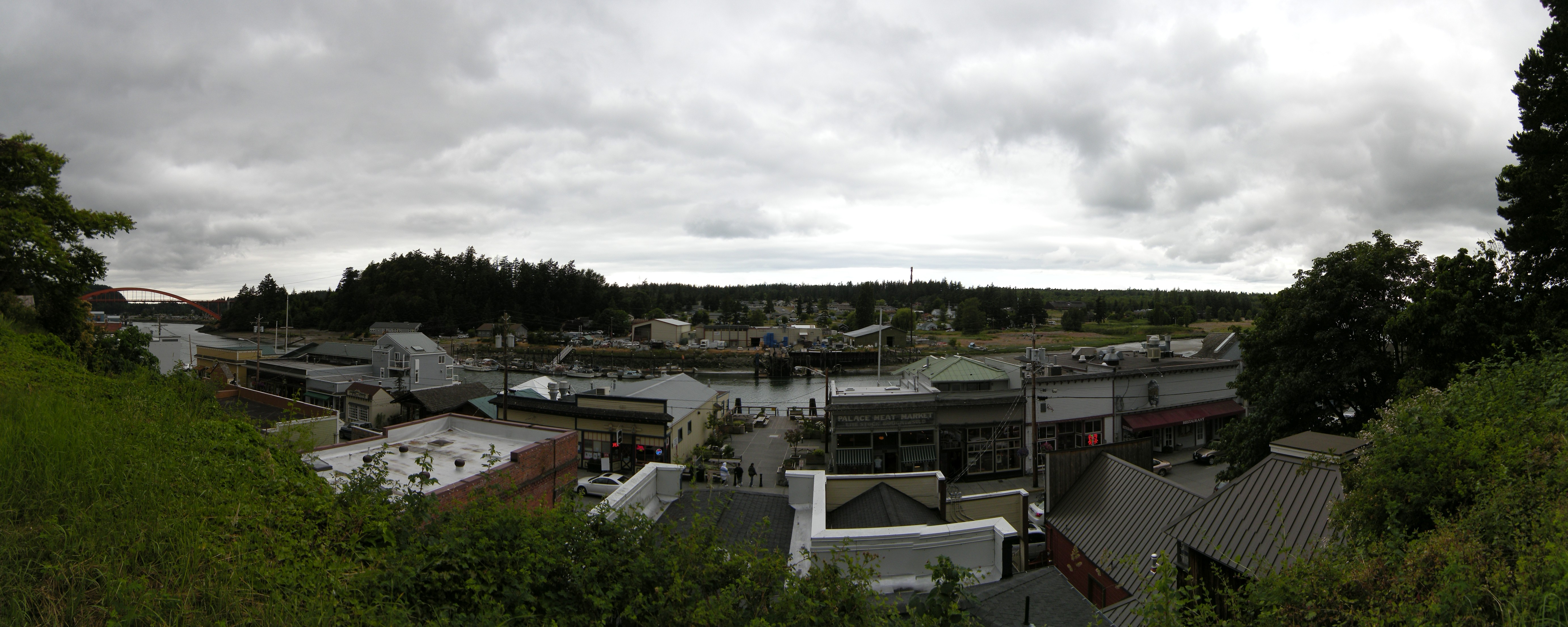
Part of downtown La Conner, with the Swinomish Channel behind it. Rainbow Bridge at left, fishing port on the Swinomish Reservation across the channel.
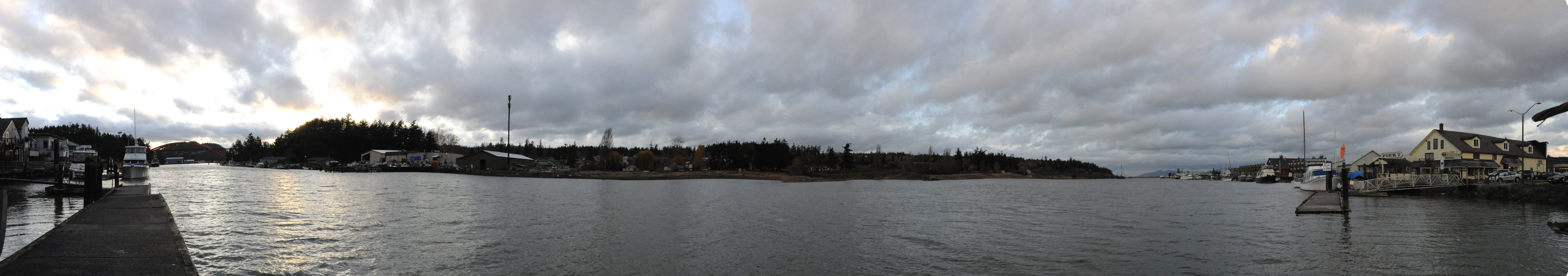
A roughly 220° view of the Swinomish Channel, near downtown La Conner. Pier 7 can be seen at right.

== Economy ==
La Conner is located at the edge of the Skagit Valley, the largest tulip-growing region in the world and host of an annual tulip festival in April. Other crops grown in the area include potatoes, vegetable seed and grain.

== Demographics ==
Historical population
Census	Pop.	Note	%±
1890	398		—
1900	564		41.7%
1910	603		6.9%
1920	516		−14.4%
1930	549		6.4%
1940	624		13.7%
1950	594		−4.8%
1960	638		7.4%
1970	639		0.2%
1980	633		−0.9%
1990	656		3.6%
2000	761		16.0%
2010	891		17.1%
2020	965		8.3%
U.S. Decennial Census

As of 2000 the median income for a household in the town was $42,344, and the median income for a family was $52,083. Males had a median income of $40,074 versus $26,875 for females. The per capita income for the town was $24,308. About 8.8% of families and 11.8% of the population were below the poverty line, including 20.3% of those under age 18 and 8.1% of those age 65 or over.

=== 2010 census ===
As of the 2010 census, there were 891 people, 467 households, and 224 families residing in the town. The population density was 2,173.2 inhabitants per square mile (839.1/km^{2}). There were 526 housing units at an average density of 1,282.9 per square mile (495.3/km^{2}). The racial makeup of the town was 87.1% White, 0.7% African American, 5.1% Native American, 1.0% Asian, 3.4% from other races, and 2.8% from two or more races. Hispanic or Latino of any race were 6.2% of the population.

There were 467 households, of which 18.0% had children under the age of 18 living with them, 36.6% were married couples living together, 8.8% had a female householder with no husband present, 2.6% had a male householder with no wife present, and 52.0% were non-families. Of all households 45.8% were made up of individuals, and 24.9% had someone living alone who was 65 years of age or older. The average household size was 1.91 and the average family size was 2.70.

The median age in the town was 52.8 years. Of all residents 16.8% were under the age of 18; 4.3% were between the ages of 18 and 24; 18.3% were from 25 to 44; 34.5% were from 45 to 64; and 26.2% were 65 years of age or older. The gender makeup of the town was 45.1% male and 54.9% female.

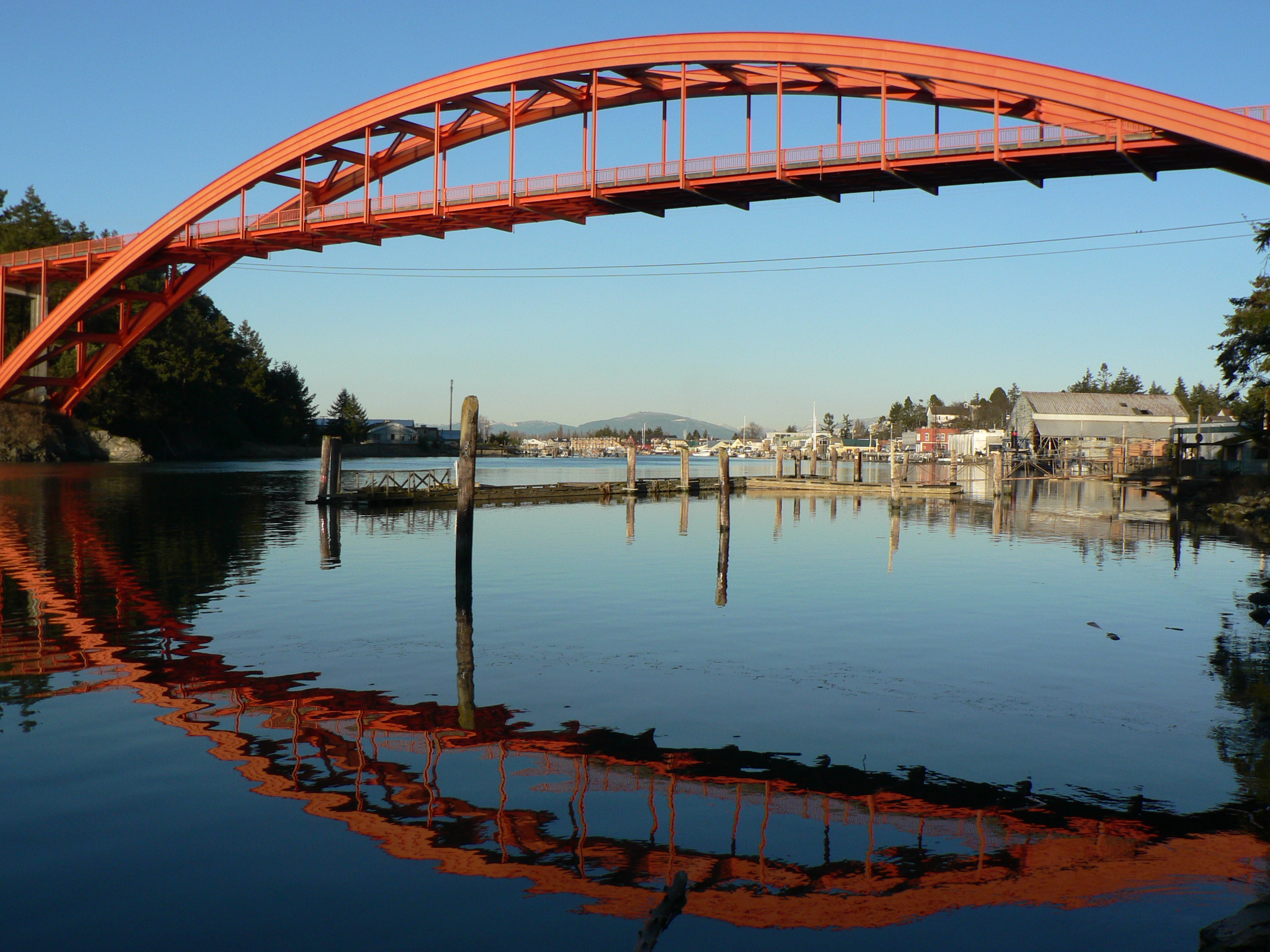
La Conner's Rainbow Bridge crossing the Swinomish Channel

== Landmarks ==
La Conner's Rainbow bridge connects La Conner to Fidalgo Island, which includes the gated Shelter Bay Community, the Swinomish reservation, and the city of Anacortes. The center of town—roughly bounded by 2nd, Morris, and Commercial streets and Swinomish Channel—is a historic district, listed on the National Register of Historic Places (NRHP). Also on the NRHP is the Bethsaida Swedish Evangelical Lutheran Church Parsonage east of town.

== Notable residents ==
- Guy Anderson, painter
- Brian Cladoosby, politician and president of the National Congress of American Indians
- Morris Graves, painter
- Art Hupy, photographer and founder of the Museum of Northwest Art
- Tom Robbins, novelist
- Joseph C. Shell, politician
- Barbara Straker James, painter and curator
- Hulet M. Wells, radical labor activist

== Education ==
The city lies within the boundaries of the La Conner School District.

== Arts and culture ==
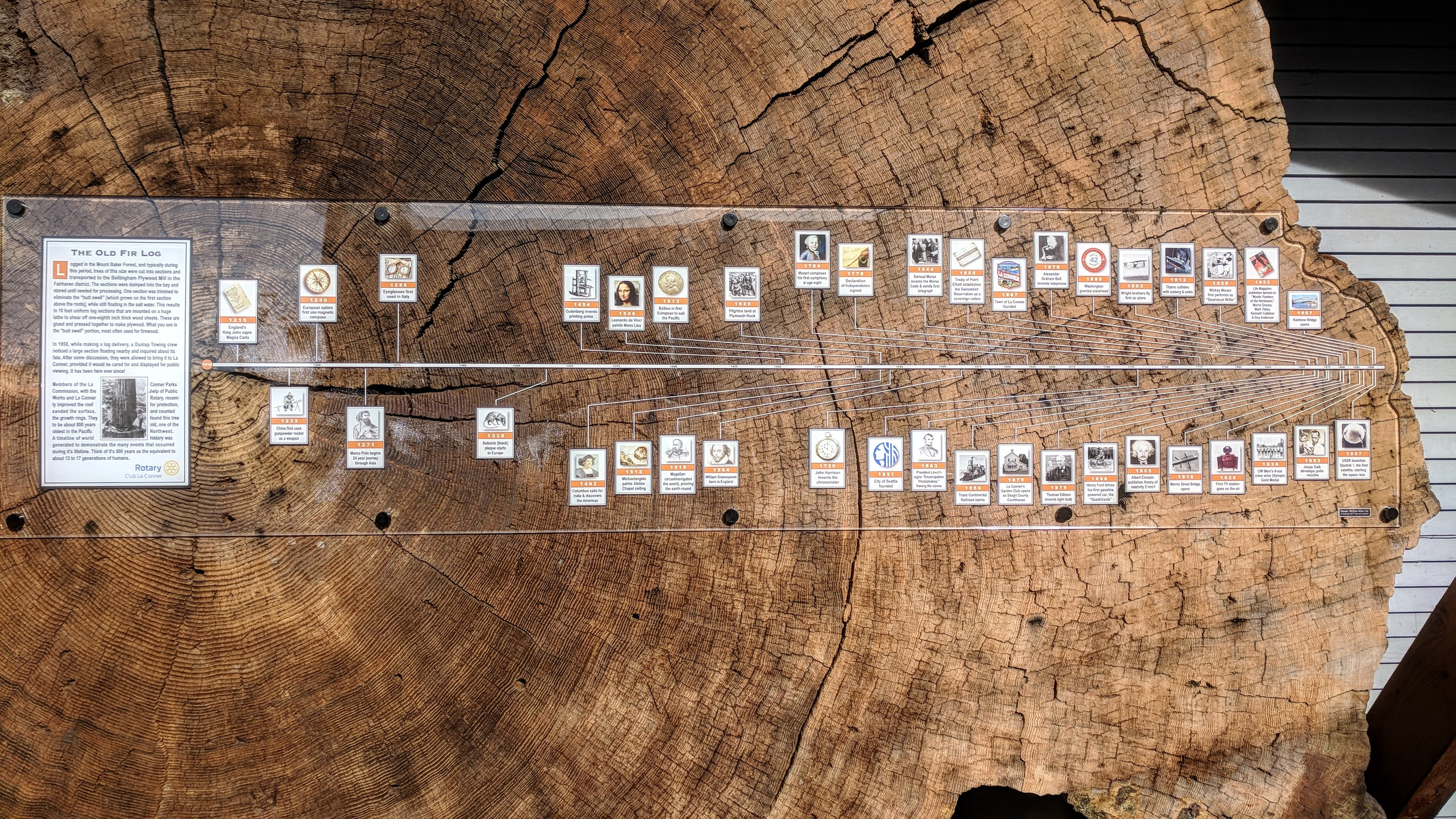
"The Old Fir Log" display on First Street includes this timeline of historic events.

The Museum of Northwest Art showcases a permanent collection of northwest artists and revolving shows throughout the year. The town is also home to the Skagit Historical Museum, with perhaps the best view in town, and the Quilt Museum, located in one of the oldest homes in town, the Gaches Mansion.

The town of La Conner is home to several fine art galleries, including La Conner Seaside Gallery, Forum Arts, Earthenworks, and Alek's Art Studio. Visual artists, painters, and photographers have also worked from spaces in and around La Conner, including Northwest School members Guy Anderson, Morris Graves, and Richard Gilkey. Fishtown, an informal artists' community housed in a cluster of old cabins and fishing shacks on the north fork of the Skagit River delta, housed many artists from the late 1960s to the mid-1980s.

Also famous for its many feral domestic turkeys, the town named the turkey as their "Official Town Bird in 2005". On August 8, 2006; however, a debate was heard in town council about whether the birds should be removed because of nuisance complaints about noise, fecal matter, and ingestion of garden materials. As of October 2010, the town council declared the turkeys to be a nuisance and has since taken action to have them removed from the town limits.

La Conner's public library, which is run by the town government and serves residents of the local school district, opened on November 26, 1993, at a former storefront. Plans to construct a permanent library were announced in 2012 with a ten-year fundraising campaign. Construction on the new library began in October 2021 and was completed the following year at a cost of $5 million. The 5,500-square-foot (510 m^{2}) building opened on October 18, 2022, and includes community spaces, a rooftop solar array, and signage in English, Spanish, Braille, and Lushootseed.

== Sister cities ==
La Conner has the following sister cities.

- White Rock, BC, Canada
- (Republic of Ireland) Kenmare, Ireland
- Olga, Russia
- San Rafael del Sur, Nicaragua
