= Swinomish Indian Tribal Community =

Federally recognized tribe in Washington (state)

Coordinates: 48°24′05″N 122°31′38″W

Swinomish Indian Tribal Community swədəbš (Lushootseed)
- Location of the Swinomish Tribe

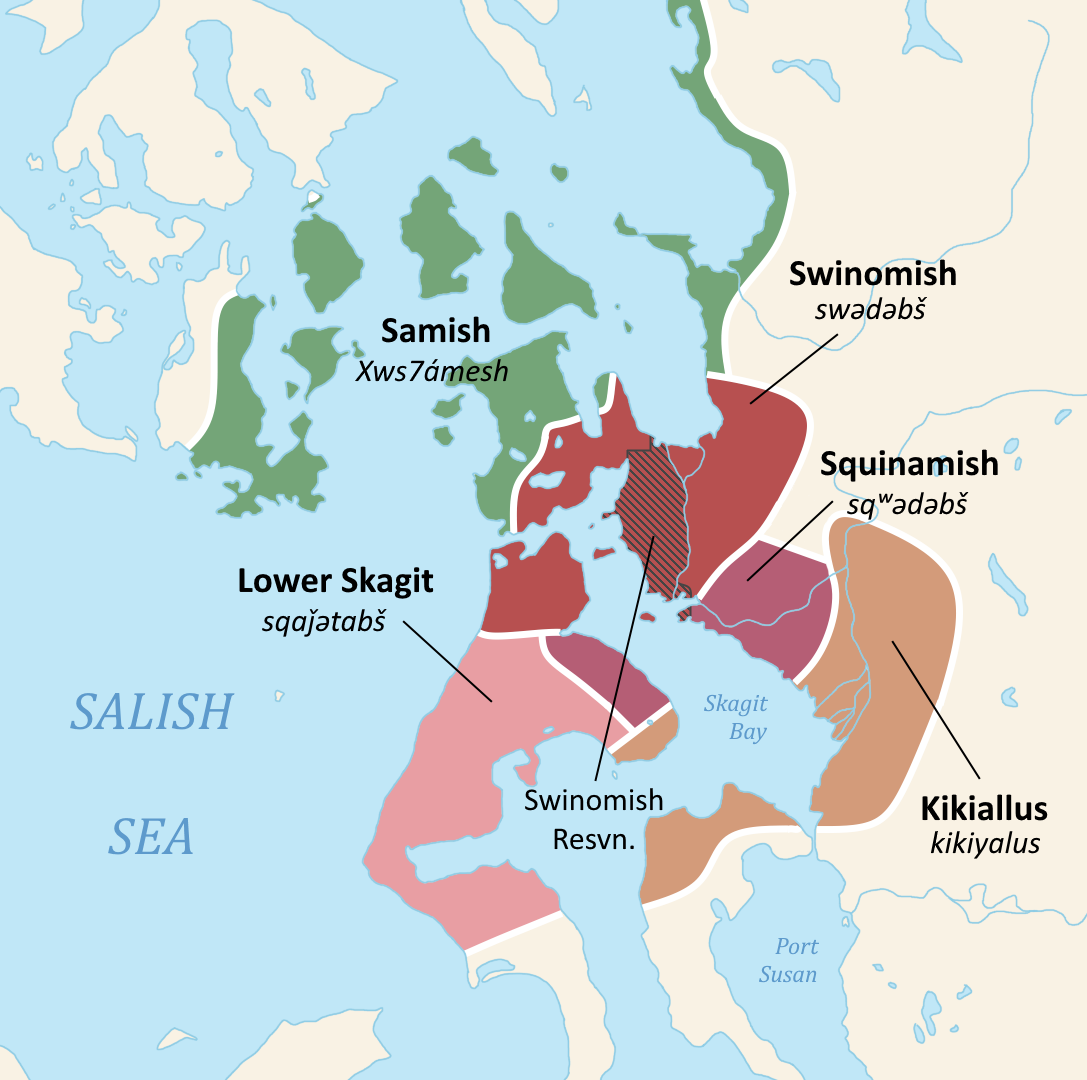
- The predecessor bands of the Swinomish Indian Tribal Community. The Samish are also succeeded by the Samish Indian Nation.
- Status: Federally recognized tribe
- Tribal headquarters: 1404 Moorage Way, La Conner, WA 98257
- Largest settlement: Swinomish Village
- Demonym: Swinomish
- Enrolled members: 1,439

Leaders
  - Chair: Steve Edwards
  - Vice-chair: Brian Porter
  - Secretary: Rodney John
  - Treasurer: Jeremy Wilbur
- Legislature: Swinomish Senate

Domestic dependent nation
  - Treaty: Treaty of Point Elliot (1855)
  - Constitution: January 27, 1936

The Swinomish Indian Tribal Community, also known as the Swinomish Tribe (Lushootseed: swədəbš), is a federally recognized tribe located on Puget Sound in Washington state. Swinomish is a legal successor to signatories of the 1855 Treaty of Point Elliott. Their reservation is located 65 miles north of Seattle, Washington on Fidalgo Island. The tribe's population is primarily composed of Swinomish, Lower Skagit, Kikiallus, and Samish peoples and their descendants. Other populations on the reservation include the Suquamish and Upper Skagit.

== History ==
The origins of the Swinomish Tribe are rooted in the various indigenous communities which make up the population of the Swinomish Tribe, including the Swinomish, Samish, Kikiallus, and Lower Skagit. The ancestral bands of the tribe originated in the Skagit and Samish river valleys and nearby coastal areas, including Fidalgo, Whidbey, Camano, and the San Juan islands.

In 1855, the ancestral bands gathered at Point Elliott (Lushootseed: bək̓ʷəɬtiwʔ) along with many other tribes. They were party to the Treaty of Point Elliott. Under the terms of the treaty, the Swinomish Reservation was established for the tribes in the area. In 1873, President Ulysses S. Grant issued an Executive Order which attempted to unilaterally change the western boundary of the Swinomish Reservation, removing March Point and surrounding areas from the Swinomish Reservation, which began a boundary dispute between the Swinomish Tribe and the United States. The United States Supreme Court has repeatedly ruled that only Congress – not a President - can reduce the size of a reservation. To this day, the Swinomish Tribe asserts their claim on the land which was depicted in original treaty maps.

In 1971, the Indian Claims Commission denied a Swinomish petition to alter the boundaries of the reservation. The Swinomish Tribe had requested the western boundary of the reservation to be restored as was promised under the Treaty of Point Elliott, even though the reservation had been slightly enlarged by the 1873 declaration changing the border.

On July 6, 1972, the Swinomish Tribe was awarded $29,000 by the Indian Claims Commission, in return for the land that they had ceded. The Commission determined that the United States had paid the Swinomish an "unconscionably low" amount, and the Swinomish Tribe requested the difference between the amount already paid and the value of the land according to today's market value.

In 2008, the Tribe produced a documentary called March Point, which follows three Swinomish teenagers investigating the effects of the oil refineries, the Puget Sound Refinery and the Marathon Anacortes Refinery, that operate on their lands.

=== BNSF lawsuit ===
In September 2012, the Tribe learned from media reports that “unit trains” of 100 railcars or more were beginning to cross the Reservation. By April 2015, BNSF was reportedly running six 100-car “unit trains” per week across the Reservation, more than four times as many railcars daily as permitted by the easement. The tracks are adjacent to the Tribe's economic center, including a hotel, casino, gas station, and cannabis dispensary. The intended development of this economic center was one of the primary reasons for the limitation of the number of trains and cars incorporated into the easement.

The Tribe filed suit against BNSF in April 2015, for violating the terms of the easement agreement. The United States District Court in Seattle ruled early in the Tribe's 2015 lawsuit that BNSF had breached the easement agreement when “BNSF neither apprised the Tribe of its cargo nor obtained the Tribe’s written agreement to an increase in the number of trains and the number of cars in those trains.” BNSF argued that its obligations to its shippers – in this instance, two refineries located on March Point near Anacortes – superseded its obligation to the Tribe under the easement agreement. After the District Court issued an order upholding the Tribe's rights in 2017, BNSF filed an appeal to the United States Court of Appeals for the Ninth Circuit. In a 2020 decision, the Court of Appeals rejected BNSF's argument.

Following the decision of the Court of Appeals, the District Court ruled in 2022 that the trespass was intentional and conducted a trial in March 2023 to determine whether BNSF's trespass over the Swinomish Reservation between September 2012 and May 2021 was also willful, conscious, and knowing, which would allow the tribe to seek disgorgement of BNSF's ill-gotten gains. Following the three-day trial, the Court found that BNSF's trespass on the Reservation was indeed willful, conscious, and knowing. The District Court then scheduled a trial that began June 3, 2024 to determine BNSF's wrongful financial gain from its trespass on the Swinomish Reservation.

In a ruling issued on June 6, 2024, District Court Judge Robert S. Lasnik ordered that BNSF disgorge total trespass profits of $394,517,169 to the Swinomish Indian Tribal Community. Specifically, the Court ordered that BNSF disgorge net profits of $362,267,169 attributable to its trespass across the Swinomish Reservation from September 2012 to May 2021. In addition, the Court ordered that BNSF disgorge a further amount of $32,250,000, representing the use value of the aftertax profits arising from the trespass. Taken together, the disgorgement amounts resulted in the total judgment against BNSF and in favor of Swinomish of $394,517,169.

== Government and politics ==
The Swinomish Tribe and its constitution were established on January 27, 1936, following the Indian Reorganization Act of 1935, which encouraged tribes to reform their governments.

The Swinomish Tribe is governed by the Swinomish Senate, an 11-member, democratically elected body. Senators serve staggered five-year terms. Every year there is an election for two seats, and every five years, there is an election for three seats. Each senator serves as the chair and vice-chair of at least one board or committee. The chair, vice-chair, secretary, and treasurer form the executive committee and are elected annually within the senate. The executive committee, with a majority vote of approval from the senate, selects representatives to serve on the tribe's remaining thirty committees, boards, and commissions. You must be at least 21 years old and a Swinomish member or staff, or have proven affiliation with the Swinomish Tribe to serve on a committee.

The Senate governs through nineteen committees, as well as ten boards and commissions. The committees do not have the authority to govern in and of themselves, but instead make recommendations to the Senate. The boards and committees operate independently from the Swinomish Tribe and Swinomish Senate.

The General Council is the public body of the Swinomish Tribe's citizenry. The council is composed of all voting-age citizens. Each year following the senate elections, the General Council meets in February to observe the swearing in of newly elected senators and the election of executive officers, engage in discourse with the Swinomish Senate, and provide input regarding annual goals for the Swinomish Tribe.

Current membership in the Swinomish Senate
Position	Name	Term
Chair	Steve Edwards	2022-2027
Vice-chair	Brian Porter	2021-2026
Secretary	Rodney John	2024-2029
Treasurer	Jeremy Wilbur	2023-2028
Senators	Greg Edwards	2021-2026
Senators	Tandy Wilbur	2021-2026
Senators	Aurelia Bailey	2022-2027
Senators	Barbara James	2023-2028
Senators	Bruce James Jr.	2024-2029
Senators	Alana Quintasket	2025-2030
Senators	Fred Cayou	2025-2030

The Swinomish Tribe is governed by the chair of the Swinomish Senate. The chair, vice-chair, secretary, and treasurer are elected by the members of the Swinomish Senate. The current chair of the Swinomish Tribe is Steve Edwards, who was elected as chairman in 2020. in the aftermath of the former chairman, Brian Cladoosby, losing his bid for reelection. . Cladoosby succeeded Robert W. Joe in 1997. Robert W. Joe was elected in 1978.

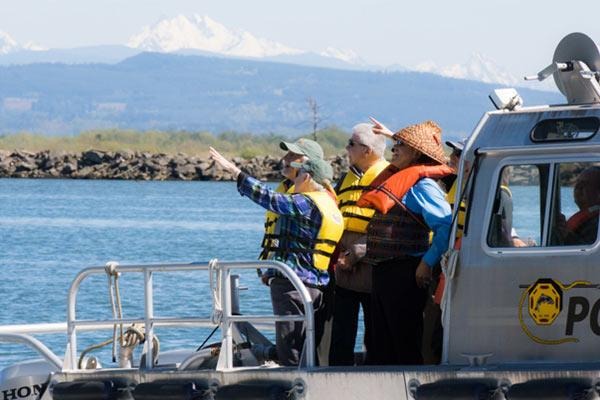
Former Chair Brian Cladoosby (right) giving a tour of the Swinomish Reservation to former EPA Administrator Gina McCarthy

History of the Swinomish Tribe's leadership
Name	Position	Term
Robert W. Joe	Chairman	1978-1997
Brian Cladoosby	Chairman	1997-2020
Steve Edwards	Chairman	2020–present

The Tribe's headquarters is in Swinomish Village at 11404 Moorage Way, La Conner, WA 98257.

The Swinomish Medical Center provides healthcare services for local Native Americans. Opened in 2000, the clinic building also houses a fitness center and diabetes program.

== Swinomish Reservation ==
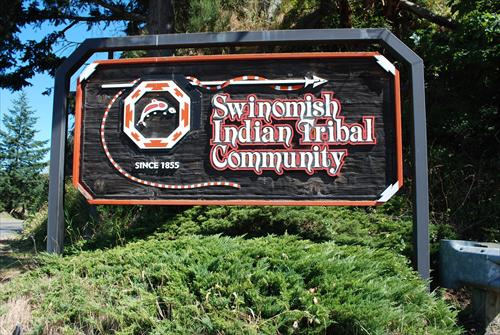
Sign at the entrance to the Swinomish Indian Reservation

The Swinomish Indian Reservation is the reservation and land body of the Swinomish Indian Tribal Community. The reservation is located on Puget Sound, on the southeastern side of Fidalgo Island in Skagit County, Washington. It is located on the Swinomish Channel, across from La Conner, Washington.

The reservation was established in 1855 by the Treaty of Point Elliot. Today, the reservation is about 15 square miles (39 km^{2}; 9,600 acres) in area, however the borders of the reservation are disputed by the Swinomish Tribe. The total reservation population according to the 2020 United States census was 3,228, representing tribal and non-tribal residents.

The Seattle and Northern Railroad Company constructed a rail line over the reservation in 1889 without permission from the tribe. The line is operated by BNSF Railway under a 1991 easement agreement allowing for only one eastern bound train, and one western bound train of twenty-five cars or less to cross the Reservation each day.

In 2023, BNSF spilled 3,100 gallons of diesel onto the Swinomish Reservation due to a train derailment.

Prominent sites on the Swinomish Reservation include:

- Swadabs Park, on Swinomish Channel: The park features three pavilions resembling woven cedar hats, interpretive panels, and a native plant garden. The park was developed for the 2011 Canoe Journey/Paddle to Swinomish. Canoe races also take place here in the channel.
- Kukutali Preserve: the first Tribal State Park in the history of the United States to be co-owned and jointly managed by a federally recognized Native Nation and a state government. The preserve is entirely on the Swinomish Reservation and encompasses 83 acres (34 ha) spanning three islands, with more than two miles (3.2 km) of natural shoreline, and is adjacent to 38 acres (15 ha) of Swinomish-owned tidelands.
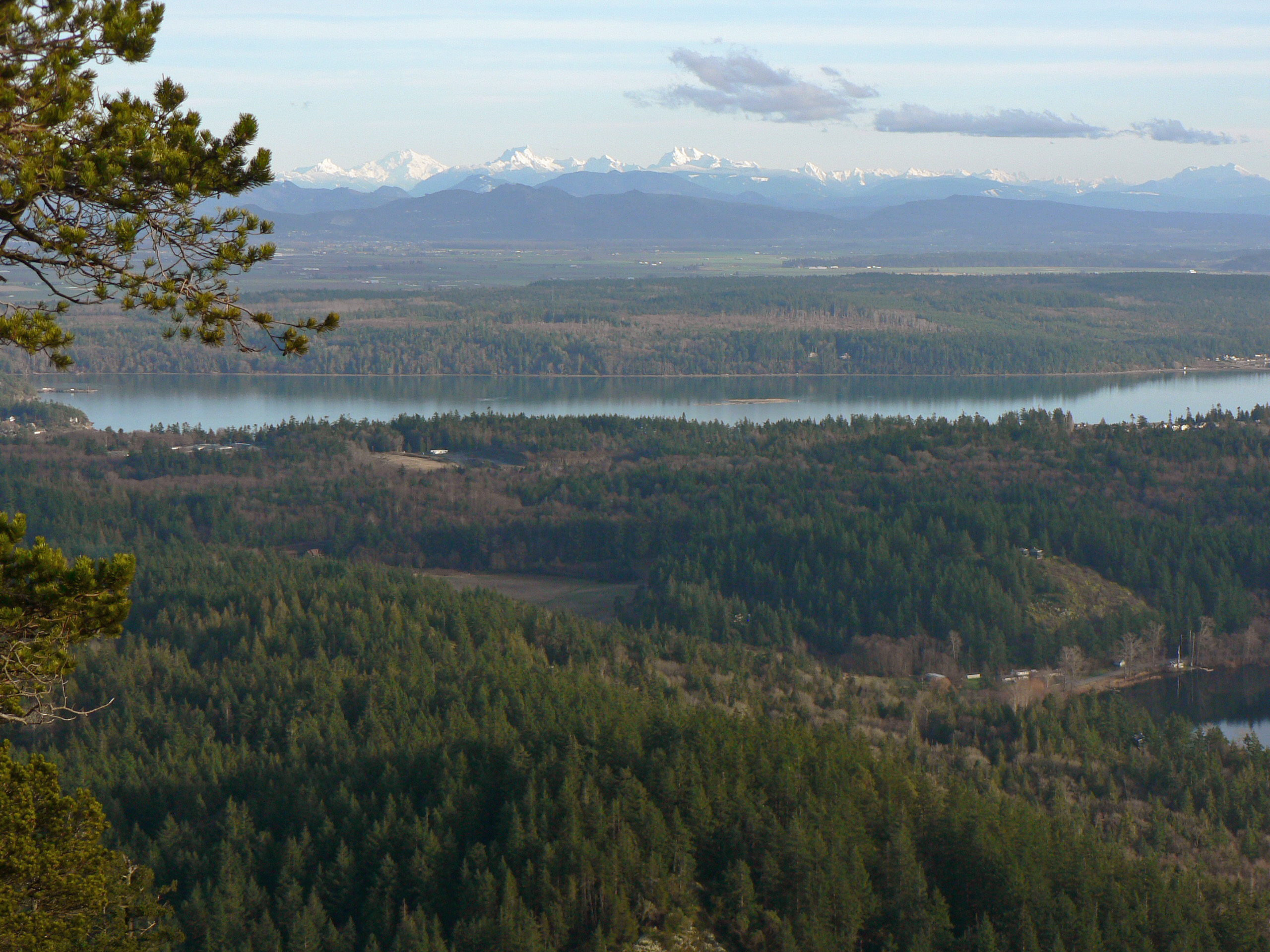
  Fidalgo Island with the Swinomish Indian Reservation in the background

== Demographics ==
The Swinomish Tribe has 1,439 enrolled members according to their own figures. The majority of the population lives in the community of Swinomish Village on reservation lands. Another large percent of members reside off the reservation, in nearby Skagit County.

Membership statistics by year
Year	Number
1909	268
1937	285
1985	624
2002	778
c. 2024	1,439

Most members of the community are Catholic.

== Culture ==
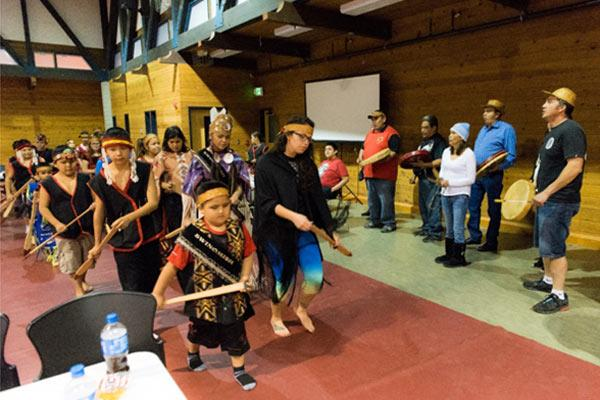
Swinomish potlatch

English is the most-commonly spoken language by Swinomish citizens. Some elders speak Swinomish (also known as Skagit), a dialect of the Lushootseed language, which is part of the Coast Salish language family. Some also spoke Samish, another Coast Salish language.

The Swinomish traditionally cultivated clam gardens and are reviving the practice to build climate resilience. Global warming and its effects, such as ocean acidification, affect the development of shells of marine animals vital to the Swinomish food supply. As such, the Swinomish consider Indigenous health indicators a metric of climate change. In 2022, the Swinomish built the first traditional clam garden in the United States in 200 years at Kiket Island. The clam gardens can produce four times as many clams than unterraced beaches.

The Swinomish hold the annual Swinomish Festival on Memorial Day. The festival includes stick-and-ball games, dancing, and a salmon bake. Additionally, the tribe celebrates the annual Treaty Days Celebration on the weekend nearest to January 22. They also hold the traditional First Salmon Ceremony each year, celebrating the beginning of the fishing season and protecting the fishermen of the community.

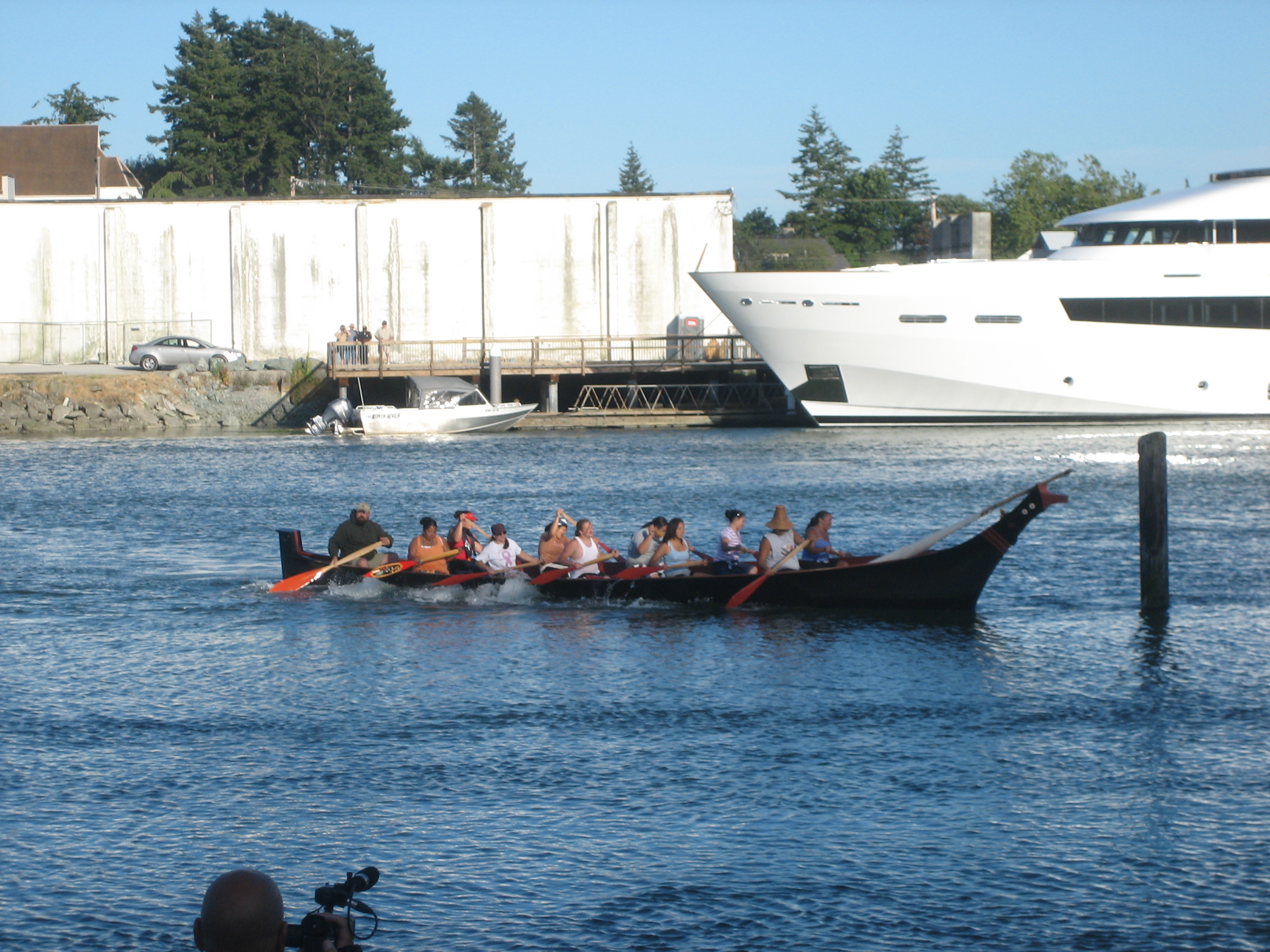
Canoe arriving at Swinomish (2008)

== Economy and services ==
A number of tribal members rely on salmon fishing and shellfish harvesting for at least a portion of their livelihood. They have had conflicts with the federal government over fishing rights throughout the 20th century. Their fish harvests have dropped by more than 80% in the last two decades due to overly-high temperatures in the Skagit River. The Swinomish Tribe announced in February 2024 their plans to sue the EPA for failing to effectively reduce stream temperatures in the Skagit River watershed. Such traditional subsistence methods are no longer the sole means of support for many tribal families.

In addition to these means, Swinomish owns and operates the Swinomish Casino & Lodge, didgʷálič Wellness Center, three Swinomish Markets locations, Salish Coast Cannabis, and Swinomish Shellfish Company.

Swinomish has become one of the five largest employers in Skagit County with over 350 employees in tribal government and approximately 600 employees in its casino and other economic enterprises.

The tribe offers educational, childcare, and health services as well. The Swinomish Tribe built a 1,375 square feet (127.7 m^{2}) healthcare center, the Swinomish Tribal Health Center.

The tribe belongs to the Skagit River System Cooperative, which was formed in 1976. The goals of the cooperative are to regulate and enhance fishing in the Skagit River watershed. The Swinomish Tribe also belongs to the Northwest Indian Fisheries Commission, a natural resources management support service organization for 20 treaty Indian tribes in western Washington created following the 1974 U.S. v. Washington ruling (Boldt Decision) that re-affirmed the tribes’ treaty-reserved fishing rights. The ruling recognized the tribes as natural resources co-managers with the State of Washington with an equal share of the harvestable number of salmon returning annually.

== Notable Swinomish citizens ==
- Brian Cladoosby, former chairman of the Swinomish Tribe and 21st president of the National Congress of American Indians, as well as the president of the Association of Washington Tribes, executive board member of the Washington Indian Gaming Association, and president of the Affiliated Tribes of Northwest Indians.
- Lorraine Loomis (1940–2021) former chair of the Northwest Indian Fisheries Commission and Swinomish Tribe senator.
- Katherine Paul, musician who records as Black Belt Eagle Scout

== See also ==
- List of Indian reservations in the United States
- List of Indian reservations in Washington
- Northwest Indian College
- Port Madison Indian Reservation
