= Kikiallus people =

Indigenous people in Washington state

Kikiallus
kikiyalus
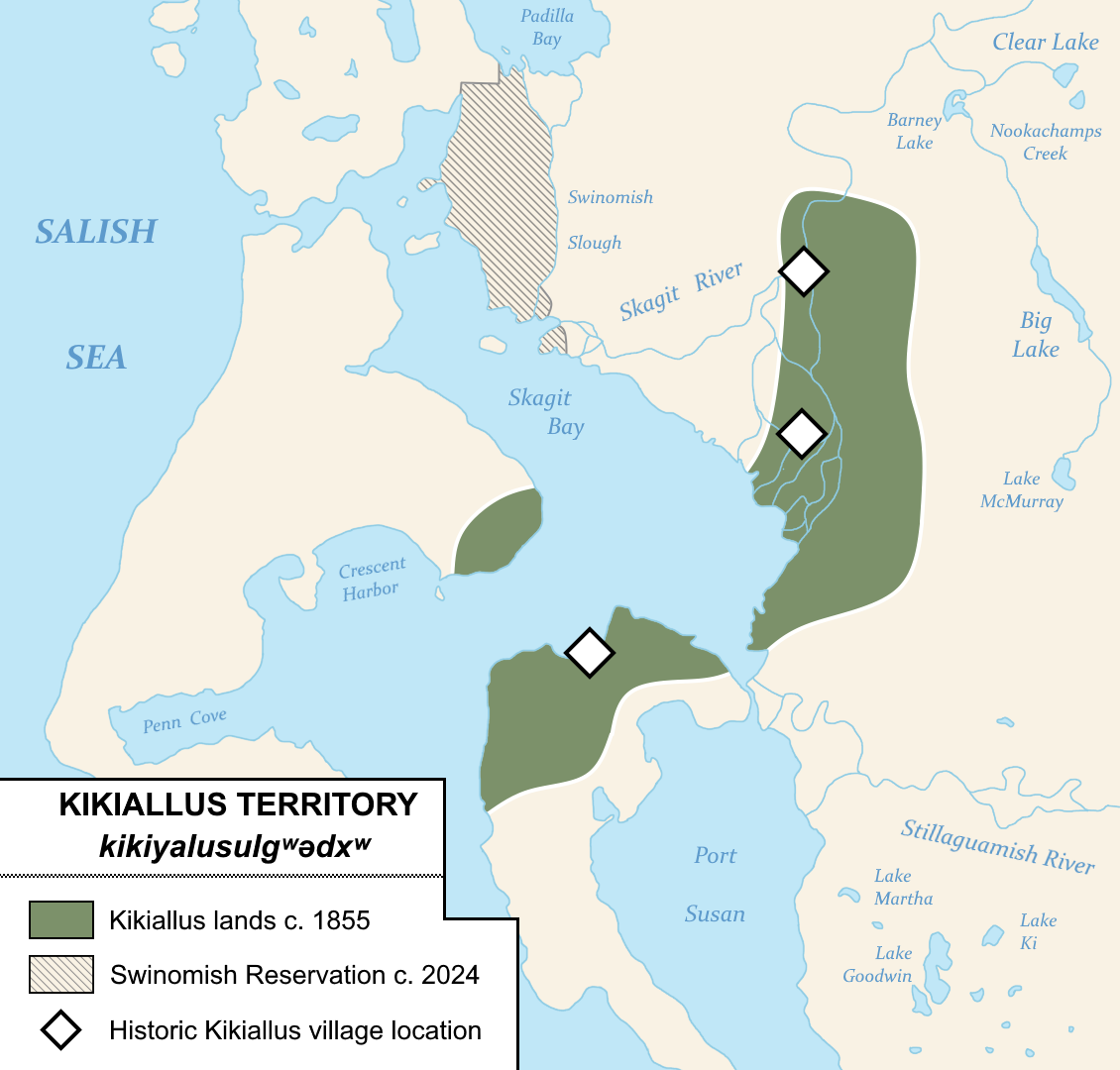
- Kikiallus territory c.1855 with known villages

Languages
- Lushootseed, English

Religion
- Traditional tribal religion and Christianity, incl. syncretic forms

Related ethnic groups
- Swinomish people, Lower Skagit people, Upper Skagit people, other Coast Salish peoples

The Kikiallus people (Lushootseed: kikiyalus) are a Lushootseed-speaking Coast Salish people Indigenous to parts of western Washington.

The Kikiallus and their descendants are enrolled primarily in the federally-recognized tribe, the Swinomish Indian Tribal Community, and are today generally recognized as one of the four groups the modern Swinomish community is descended from. The Kikiallus traditionally spoke the Lushootseed language, but throughout the colonial period, usage of the language decreased. Now, English is the primary language spoken by the Kikiallus, with Lushootseed generally reserved for ceremonial activities. There are also efforts by the Swinomish and other tribes to revitalize the language in daily use.

The traditional territory of the Kikiallus extended along the South Fork Skagit River to the confluence of the forks and the northern half of Camano Island, as well as some holdings on Whidbey Island near Strawberry Point. The primary settlement of the Kikiallus was at kikiyalusali (meaning "Kikiallus place") at the mouth of Carpenter Creek near Conway, downriver from the present-day town. There were four longhouses there in the mid 19th century. The Kikiallus also had villages at the confluence of the two forks of the Skagit River and at ʔəcəladiʔ (Utsalady Bay).

The Kikiallus were signatories to the 1855 Treaty of Point Elliot. The selected leader of the Kikiallus (written then as Kik-i-allus) was Sdzomahtl. Subsequently, most Kikiallus were removed to the Swinomish reservation. In 1916, the Kikiallus, represented by John Lyons, a descendant of the Snoqualmie leader Patkanim, sued the United States government regarding treaty rights. In the 1920s, Bill Jake was the chief of the Kikiallus. In 1950, Alfanso Sampson, an enrolled member of the Swinomish Indian Tribal Community, was elected as chief of the Kikiallus.
