= Swinomish Channel =

Waterway in northwest Washington, United States

- The Swinomish Channel and Rainbow Bridge from La Conner
- Interactive map of Swinomish Channel
- Location: Skagit County, Washington, U.S.
- Coordinates: 48°24′43″N 122°29′50″W

Specifications
- Length: 11 miles (18 km)

History
- Former names: Swinomish Slough
- Date completed: 1893, 1937

Geography
- Connects to: Skagit Bay, Padilla Bay

Swinomish Channel is a saltwater channel in the Salish Sea of Washington, United States, separating Fidalgo Island from the mainland and the town of La Conner. Historically, it was known as the Swinomish Slough, a wide corridor of freshwater and saltwater marshland, braided channels, and sloughs which lay at the northwestern corner of the Skagit River Estuary. Large mudflats are still present at either end of the channel, although only small pockets of marsh remain.

The region around the channel was traditionally inhabited by Coast Salish peoples such as the Swinomish, who now live on the Swinomish Reservation on the channel's western shore. American colonists settled in the area beginning in the 1863 and began constructing levees around local sloughs. Southern portions of the slough were dredged and channelized in the 1890s and 1900s, alongside the construction of dikes and jetties to limit the deposition of sediment. Further expansion of the channel was performed in the 1930s by the United States Army Corps of Engineers, who removed over 1,000,000 cubic yards (760,000 m^{3}) of sediment from the channel, filling neighboring marshland and mudflats. The Corps of Engineers continues to maintain and dredge Swinomish Channel for navigation, damaging aquatic habitat used by salmonids. The Swinomish purchased agricultural areas around the channel in 2000 to restore fish access to some tributary creeks, relict channels, and sloughs.

== Hydrology ==
Swinomish Channel runs for about 11 miles (18 km) at the northern end of the Puget Sound in the U.S. state of Washington. It connects Skagit Bay in the south to Padilla Bay in the north, separating Fidalgo Island from the mainland. The northern distributary channel of the Skagit River delta drains into Skagit Bay on the southern end of the channel, as does the Sullivan Slough south of the town of La Conner. Large mudflats are present at both ends of the channel. Prior to dredging in the 20th century, the channel was known as the Swinomish Slough, a wide corridor of estuarine marshland and sloughs northwest of the Skagit Estuary. Many braided channels and blind tidal channels (channels with only one open end) ran through the area. About 1,260 acres (5.1 km^{2}) of salt marsh were present in the northern portion of the slough prior to dredging.

Swinomish Channel as seen from the La Conner waterfront

During the mid-Holocene (around 5,000 years ago), volcanic material in the Skagit basin from the eruptions of Glacier Peak led to the progradation of the delta, which eventually grew to close off the northern end of Whidbey Basin, largely connecting Fidalgo Island to the mainland and leaving Swinomish Slough as the only direct connection between Skagit Bay and Padilla Bay. By 2005, only 14 small patches of marsh were located along the channel, with the salt marshes mainly reclaimed as agricultural land. About 410 acres (170 ha) of freshwater marsh are present around the modern channel, mainly around the Skagit River estuary and the Sullivan Slough. Various small tributary streams and sloughs flow into Swinomish Channel.

The area west of the channel is part of the Swinomish Reservation. The northwestern coast of the channel is largely undeveloped, although the southwestern shoreline features residential areas, including the Shelter Bay community. Outside of La Conner, the eastern shore of the channel is rural and dominated by agriculture.

Estuarine marshland in the channel watershed hosts spawning salmonids and their prey. Periodic dredging by the United States Army Corps of Engineers to maintain safe navigation along the channel has harmed the aquatic habitat. Chinook salmon are reported in low numbers around the channel, possibly due to greater salinity in the surround bays as a result of human modifications. Low-salinity waters in the channel suitable for juvenile Chinook salmon are mainly restricted to the southern end of the channel, with occasional pulses of water from the Skagit River extending fresh water to the vicinity of the Rainbow Bridge at La Conner.

== Human history ==
Native American peoples are known to have resided in the Skagit River basin for at least 11,000 years. Prior to Euro-American contact, the wider Salish Sea region was mainly inhabited by the Coast Salish peoples. The area around Swinomish Slough was near the contact zone between speakers of the North Straits Salish to the north and Lushootseed to the south. The North Straits-speaking Samish lived on Fidalgo Island and the San Juan Islands to the northwest, while the Lushootseed-speaking Swinomish and Lower Skagit lived near the Skagit River estuary to the south and east. A Lushootseed-speaking village named qaliqət was located on the northwestern edge of Swinomish Slough. Further south along the western shore were the Swinomish villages of cuxʷtədačiʔ and xʷixʷuc. An unnamed Swinomish village was present on the eastern side of the channel near Sullivan Slough, while the village of bəsɫaʔus was located northeast of the slough at Padilla Bay. The various braided channels of the slough were productive for salmon fishing, and the Swinomish community maintained drift nets along the slough in order to catch salmon as late as the 1920s.

European and American expeditions explored the Pacific Northwest around the turn of the 19th century, and British and American traders began to operate in the region. Native canoe crews frequently used Swinomish Slough, as it avoided the dangerous rip tides of Deception Pass, a narrow strait separating Fidalgo from Whidbey Island. The British Hudson's Bay Company began using it as a trade route by the 1840s. Although fear of violent resistance by the Swinomish dissuaded earlier settlers, American colonists began to claim land around the slough in 1863. In 1867, a trading post was established along the east shore of the strait near the outlet on to Skagit Bay. A post office was established there the following year under the name "Swinomish". Settler John S. Conner purchased the post in 1869 and renamed it to La Conner.

=== Dredging and modifications ===
Soon after colonization began, Euro-American settlers began constructing levees along the sloughs of the Skagit lowlands. Small American boats frequently took Swinomish Slough as a means to bypass Deception Pass and the Rosario Strait, but shifting shoals and mud flats at the mouth of the Skagit led to hazardous navigation conditions.

A baptism at the Swinomish Channel in La Conner, c. 1890

The Rivers and Harbors Act of 1892 ordered the dredging of the Swinomish Channel from Goat Island (a small islet southwest of the slough in Skagit Bay) up through the northern end of the slough. By 1894, the North Dike was constructed, running for 7,000 feet (2.1 km) along the northern shore of the dredged channel at the south end of the Swinomish Reservation. Concurrently, a causeway was constructed to link McGlinn Island at the southeastern end of the channel with the mainland. In order to block the sediment which continued to enter Swinomish Channel, the South Jetty was constructed on the west end of Goat Island between 1907 and 1908, stretching 3,650 feet (1,110 m) out towards Saratoga Passage.

Steamboat ferries and cargo ships regularly transited the Swinomish Channel around the turn of the 20th century. By 1894, a daily steam ferry carried passengers to and from La Conner, and remained in daily service until 1917. An 1898 report by the United States Army Corps of Engineers estimated that steamers carried around 6,000 passengers to La Conner annually. Logs, oats, timber, and hay were commonly transported along the channel during the 1890s, although the volume of trade greatly decreased as motor vehicles gained popularity in the early 20th century.

Under the Rivers and Harbors Act of 1935, the channel was to be kept 100 feet (30 m) wide and 12 feet (3.7 m) deep at mean low water level (MLWL). The Army Corps of Engineers oversaw the expansion, filling marshlands on the Swinomish reservation with well over 1,000,000 cubic yards (760,000 m^{3}) of dredged sediment. After construction completed in 1937, landfill had cleared 105 miles (169 km) of tidal slough, about 56% of historic water channels, and about 75% of the slough's former mudflats, salt marshes, and seagrass habitat. Relict channels left behind by the landfill were converted to drainage ditches fitted with floodgates, blocking off access by aquatic wildlife. Tidal influence was extended throughout the Swinomish Channel by the Corps of Engineers' channel expansions. A 6,000-foot (1,800 m) long rock jetty was contemporaneously constructed between McGlinn Island and Goat Island.

A storm in 1940 damaged the Goat-McGlinn Jetty and destroyed much of the causeway. The jetty was rebuilt by federal contractors during the early 1940s, and by 1946 it was raised to 15 feet (4.6 m) above MLWL, while the causeway was converted into a disposal area for sediment dredged up during maintenance. Further repairs were made on the Goat-McGlinn Jetty in 1963. The South Jetty was raised and expanded in 1976.

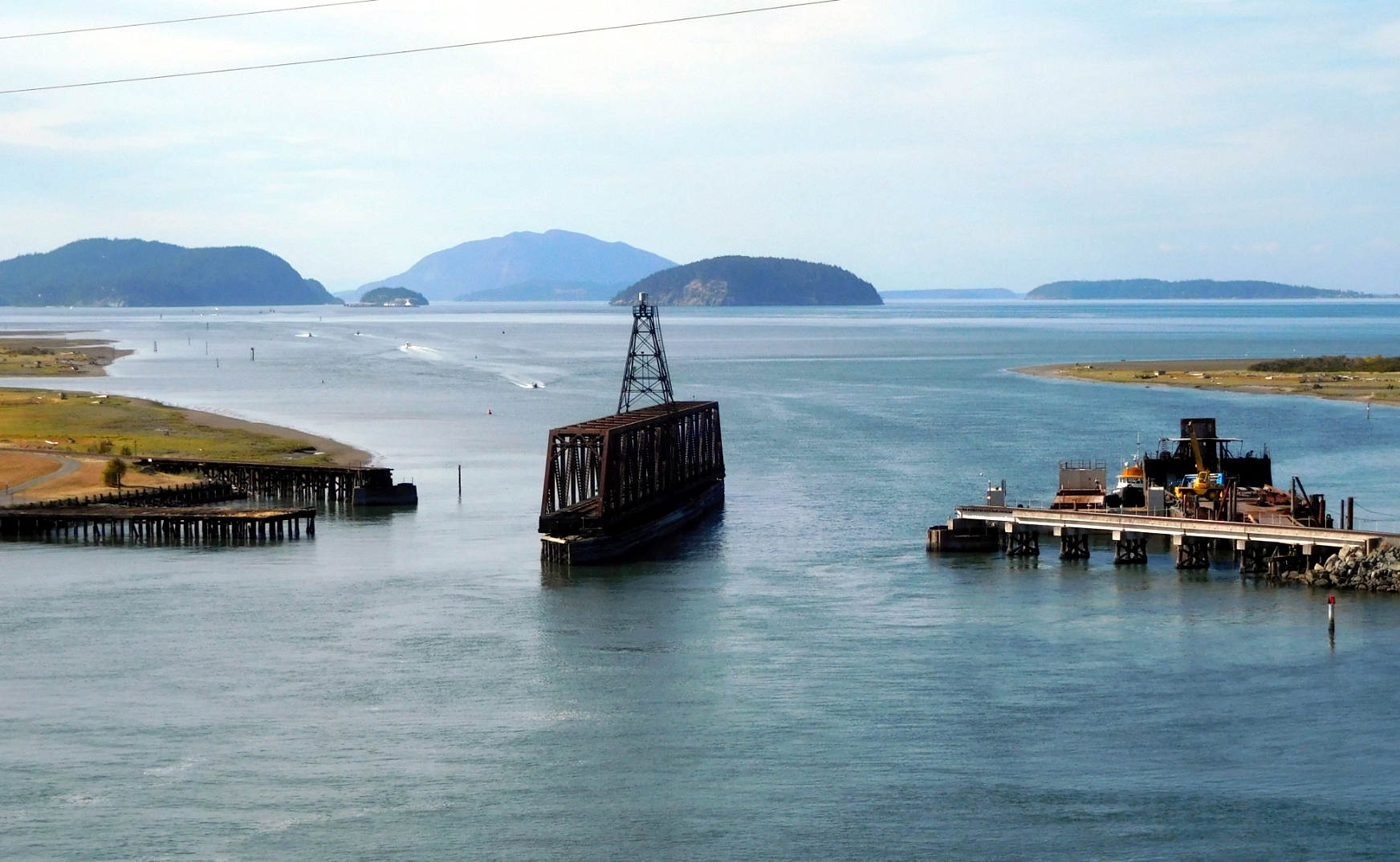
The BNSF Swinomish Channel Bridge swung open at the northern end of the channel

=== Contemporary history ===
An oil pipeline was laid under the channel in 1955, connecting to a Shell Oil refinery on Fidalgo Island. The Rainbow Bridge was constructed over the channel from La Conner in 1957, while the Swinomish Channel Bridge, an elevated bridge carrying Washington State Route 20, was opened in 1973.

During the late 20th century, the Swinomish Indian Community rallied to open up creeks, relict channels, and sloughs in the area to fish passage and spawning. Many of these channels were blocked by floodgates for agricultural use. In 2000, the Swinomish purchased 350 acres (140 ha) of agricultural land around Fornsby Creek, a tributary of the channel on the west bank. The tribe worked with the Washington State Department of Ecology over the following years to retrofit several gates to allow for fish passage, plant riparian vegetation, and remove culverts. As of 2023, tribal operations to restore salt marsh habitat at its Smokehouse Flats property near Fornsby Creek are underway. The Army Corps of Engineers repaired a breach in the Goat-McGlinn Jetty in 2023.
