= Shelter Bay, Washington =

Community in Washington, United States

Shelter Bay is a small community near La Conner, Washington. La Conner is located at 48°23′26″N 122°29′44″W (48.390495, -122.495646).

According to the United States Census Bureau, the town has a total area of 1.3 km² (0.5 mi²). 1.1 km² (0.4 mi²) of it is land and 0.2 km² (0.1 mi²) of it (15.69%) is water.

Shelter Bay is located on the Swinomish Indian reservation and most lots are leased from the Swinomish tribe.

== Features ==
Shelter Bay features private access to Martha's Beach and Rainbow Beach (also known as 'Little Beach': the exact name has not been determined), numerous scenic hiking trails, three tennis courts, two swimming pools, a small nine-hole golf course, playground and a club house. The club house can be rented for private parties, weddings and funeral receptions. Shelter Bay includes an uncovered marina as well as some homes with private docks.

== Community Home Owner's Association and Amenities ==
Shelter Bay is a gated community managed by a homeowners association that collects dues and assessments from residents, manages community services and amenities, maintains roads and public facilities and operates the community water and sewer services.

The Shelter Bay HOA also enforces rules and regulations as defined in the community Declaration of Protective Covenants which regulates issues regarding "trees, landscaping, pets, satellite dishes, clotheslines, fences, parking, home businesses, rental of homes and other issues".
