= List of Indian reservations in Washington =

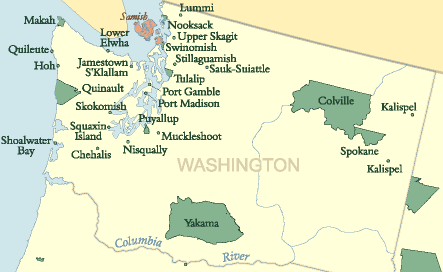
Map of reservations in Washington state

There are 29 Indian reservations in the U.S. state of Washington.

== List of reservations ==
Official name	Population	Area (acres)	Location
Confederated Tribes of the Chehalis Reservation	833	4,215	Southeastern Grays Harbor County and southwestern Thurston County
Colville Indian Reservation	9,353	1,400,000	Primarily in the southeastern section of Okanogan County and the southern half of Ferry County
Cowlitz Reservation	4,800	152	Ridgefield, WA (Clark County)
Hoh Indian Reservation	102	443	The Pacific Coast of Jefferson County
Jamestown S'Klallam Indian Reservation	594	12	Near Sequim Bay, in extreme eastern Clallam County
Kalispel Indian Reservation	470	4,629	The town of Cusick, in Pend Oreille County
Lower Elwha Indian Reservation	776	991	The mouth of the Elwha River, in Clallam County
Lummi Indian Reservation	6,590	21,000	West of Bellingham, in western Whatcom County
Makah Indian Reservation	1,356	27,950	On Cape Flattery in Clallam County
Muckleshoot Indian Reservation	3,300	3,850	Southeast of Auburn in King County
Nisqually Indian Reservation	588	4,800	Western Pierce County and eastern Thurston County
Nooksack Indian Reservation	1,800	2,500	Town of Deming, Washington in western Whatcom County
Port Gamble Indian Reservation	1,234	1,301	Port Gamble Bay in Kitsap County
Port Madison Reservation (Suquamish Indian Reservation)	507?	7,486	Western and northern shores of Port Madison, northern Kitsap County
Puyallup Indian Reservation	4,000	18,061	Primarily northern Pierce County
Quileute Indian Reservation	371	1,003.4	Southwestern portion of the Olympic Peninsula in Clallam County
Quinault Indian Nation	2,535	208,150	Primarily the north coast of Grays Harbor County
Sauk-Suiattle Indian Reservation	200	96	Near Darrington in southern Skagit County
Shoalwater Bay Indian Reservation	70	334	Along Willapa Bay in northwestern Pacific County
Skokomish Indian Reservation	796	5,000	Just north of Shelton in Mason County
Snoqualmie Indian Reservation	650	56	Snoqualmie Valley in east King and Snohomish Counties
Spokane Indian Reservation	2,708	154,898	Almost entirely in southern Stevens County and in northeastern Lincoln County along the Spokane River
Squaxin Island Indian Reservation	936	1,979	The entirely of Squaxin Island and the town of Kamilche in Mason County
Stillaguamish Indian Reservation	237	40	Along the Stillaguamish River in Snohomish County
Swinomish Indian Reservation	3,228	7,169	The southeastern side of Fidalgo Island in Skagit County
Tulalip Indian Reservation	2,600	11,500	Port Susan in western Snohomish County
Upper Skagit Indian Reservation	200	99	Western Skagit County near the towns of Sedro-Woolley and Burlington
Yakama Indian Reservation	10,851	1,372,000	Primarily in southern Yakima County and in the northern edge of Klickitat County

== See also ==
- Indigenous peoples of the Pacific Northwest Coast
- List of federally recognized tribes in Washington
- List of Indian reservations in the United States
