= Art Hupy =

American photographer

Art Hupy (1924 – April 17, 2003) was an American freelance commercial photographer noted for his images of architecture and artists from the Northwest School. Hupy also founded the Museum of Northwest Art.

== Personal life ==
Hupy was born in Seattle, Washington and served in the United States Army in Germany during World War II. After returning home from the war, he married Rita Manning and they both moved to Los Angeles, California where he studied photography.

== Professional career ==
Hupy began his career in 1953. After relocating to Seattle, he worked as a freelance photographer for Rainier Brewing Company, Northwest Airlines, United Press International, Time, and Sunset. By this time, he had developed a reputation for his portraiture of Northwest School artists such as Morris Graves, Kenneth Callahan and Guy Anderson. In the 1950s and early 1960s Hupy also photographed works by Northwest Modern architects.

Discouraged by the Vietnam War, Hupy and his wife relocated to British Columbia in the 1960s. Hupy's activities during this time are summarized by the University of Washington Libraries:

In 1963 he moved his family to an island in Blind Channel in British Columbia to paint, sculpt, study and educate his children. From 1966 to 1968 he was a freelance designer and photographer in Vancouver where he also conducted a part-time school of professional photography. He returned to Seattle in 1968 and taught photography at The Bush School and Seattle Community College. He was also a freelance Graphic Arts Consultant to Seattle Public Schools in 1971.

In 1977, Hupy opened the first art gallery in La Conner, Washington and moved there with his wife Rita. (Hupy had become acquainted with the area and its resident artists during the mid-1950s when working on Sunset magazine assignments.) In 1981, Hupy founded the Museum of Northwest Art in La Conner, Washington and served as its first director and curator. Hupy resigned his position as museum director in 1990.

Hupy's work was well regarded within his profession; some of his exhibitions are noted by the University of Washington Libraries:

He won 25 awards for advertising art including those given out by Seattle Advertising Art and the American Institute of Architects. He participated in numerous exhibitions, including those at the Seattle World's Fair, San Francisco Museum of Art, New York Advertising Art, and Henry Art Gallery.

Several years before his death, Hupy suffered a stroke and was no longer able to make photographic prints. Some time thereafter he donated his collection to the University of Washington. The majority of Hupy's photographs are now archived in Modern Photographers Collection at the University of Washington Libraries Special Collections Division.
