= Museum of Northwest Art =

Art Museum in La Conner, Washington

Coordinates: 48.3916°N 122.4957°W

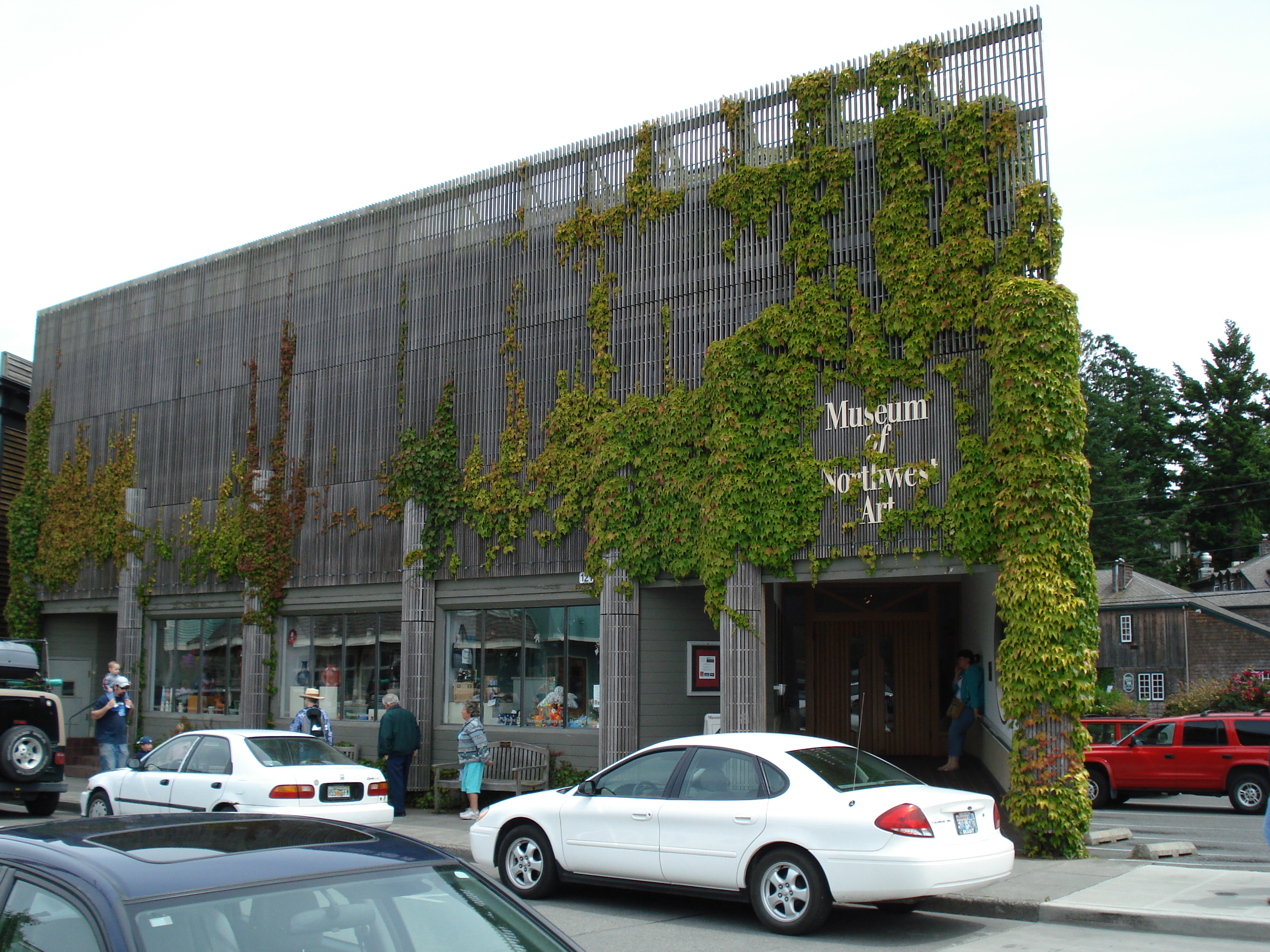
- The Museum of Northwest Art in La Conner
- Former name: Valley Museum of Northwest Art
- Established: 1981
- Location: 121 N 1st Street, La Conner, Washington, U.S.
- Type: Art Museum
- Website: monamuseum.org

The Museum of Northwest Art (also referred to as MoNA) is an art museum located in La Conner, Washington, and is focused on the Northwest School art movement, which had its peak in the mid-20th century. The Museum was founded by Art Hupy in 1981. It moved to its present building in 1995. An annual celebration of Northwest artists encompasses the MoNA auction, supporting museum programming.

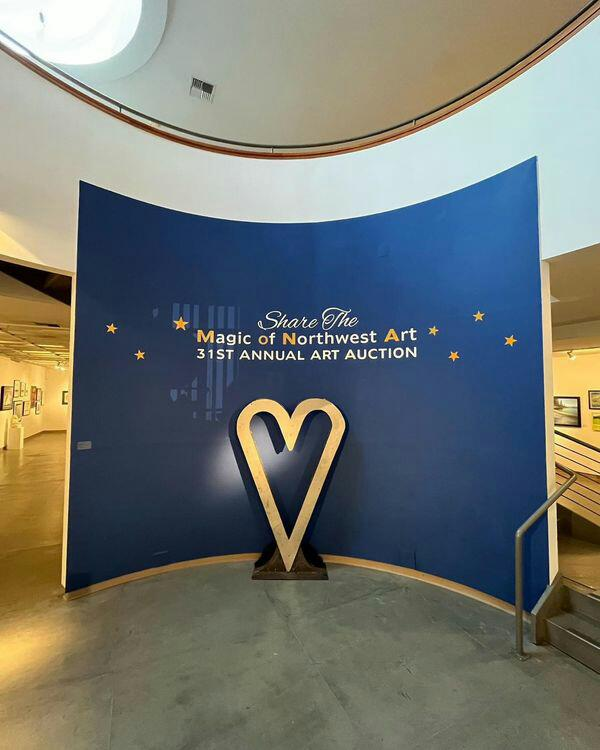
Paul Kuniholm, "Stainless Heart", shown at Museum of Noethwest Art, 2023
