= Swinomish people =

Coordinates: 48.4014°N 122.5270°W

Swinomish
swədəbš
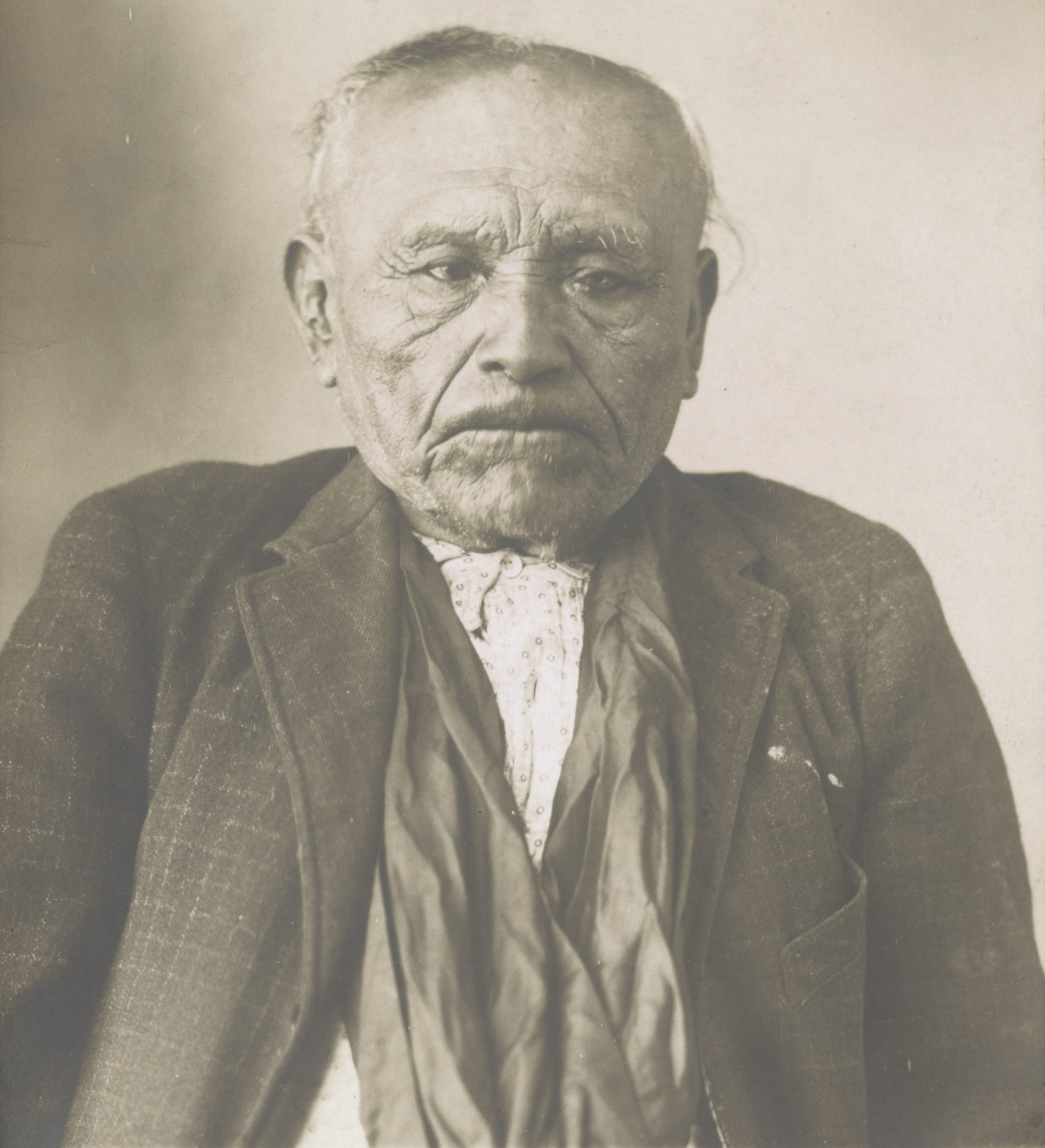
- Dr. Joe, a Swinomish doctor, c. 1907

Total population
- approx. 1,439

Regions with significant populations
- Fidalgo Island, Skagit County

Languages
- English, historically Lushootseed

Religion
- Indigenous folk religion, Christianity, incl. syncretic forms

Related ethnic groups
- other Lushootseed-speaking peoples, esp. the Squinamish, Lower Skagit, and Kikiallus peoples

The Swinomish people (/ˈswɪnəmɪʃ/ SWIN-ə-mish; Lushootseed: swədəbš) are a Lushootseed-speaking people Indigenous to western Washington state.

The tribe lives in the southeastern part of Fidalgo Island in northern Puget Sound, near the San Juan Islands, in Skagit County, Washington. Skagit County is located about 70 miles (110 km) north of Seattle

Swinomish people are enrolled in the federally recognized Swinomish Indian Tribal Community, also known as the Swinomish Tribe, which is headquartered in Swinomish Village, across the Swinomish Channel from La Conner.

== Classification ==
The Swinomish are a Southern Coast Salish people. The Southern Coast Salish includes the many Lushootseed-speaking peoples as well as the Twana.

The Swinomish are closely related to their historical neighbors, including the Squinamish, Lower Skagit, and Kikiallus peoples. In the early colonial period, whites believed that the Swinomish were a part of the Lower Skagit, however, they were separate and distinct peoples.

== History ==
According to the 20th century Swinomish historian Martin J. Sampson, the Swinomish people descend from a group of Kikiallus people who left their village at what is now Utsalady to settle in Shelter Bay. After their establishment, they prospered and eventually became their own distinct group. Alternatively, another origin story states that the Swinomish are descended from a noble's son who gained a powerful spirit power, and he and his wife became the ancestor of all peoples.

Around 1830–1835, a major smallpox epidemic blazed through the villages of Skagit County, including the Swinomish. The epidemics reduced the Swinomish populations by up to 80%, according to some estimations. Around 1855, the U.S. government recorded the Swinomish population to be around 150–200 people.

In 1855, the Swinomish were party to the Treaty of Point Elliott. Under the treaty, the Swinomish Reservation was established, and the Swinomish were required to remove to it. Three Swinomish signed the treaty: Belole, Stodumkan, and Kelkahltsoot. The U.S. Government hoped that the Swinomish would turn to farming once the reservation was established. By 1884, about three-fourths of the Swinomish were logging, farming, and milling.

Throughout the 1860s, many Swinomish left their homelands, scattering around Puget Sound in search of work. On the reservation, there were clashes between settlers and Swinomish regarding the boundaries of their lands.

== Territory and land base ==
Historically, the Swinomish controlled much of Fidalgo Island. Their territory included the entire eastern half of Fidalgo Island down to Deception Pass, all of Whidbey Island above the northern half of Dugualla Bay, as well as a portion of Padilla Bay and the mainland north of the Skagit River extending about halfway to what is now Mount Vernon.

After the 1855 treaty, the Swinomish were constrained to the Swinomish Reservation, alongside the other bands of the Swinomish Indian Tribal Community. They continue to exercise their sovereignty as a domestic dependent nation of the United States.

=== Villages ===
Like other Coast Salish peoples, the Swinomish traditionally built permanent villages along waterways, especially near fresh water outlets like rivers and creeks. Villages were independent from one another, but nominally connected to the other Swinomish villages through kinship ties and shared customs and language.

One of the main villages of the Swinomish was located near the headwaters of Sullivan Slough, near today's La Conner. This village was fortified by deep ditches filled with sharp ironwood stakes surrounding the village. Its strategic value was further amplified by its location: it could only be reached by large war canoes at high tide. This village was decimated by smallpox, with only one surviving family. Many of the Swinomish today are descended from this family.

List of known Swinomish villages
Name	Anglicization(s)	Location	Notes
	Qalequt	near Whitney	
		Three miles from La Conner, on Swinomish Slough	
sdiʔus	Snee Oosh	Snee Oosh, near Lone Tree Point	
		Shelter Bay	Oldest and main village
		Sullivan Slough	Highly fortified village, many Swinomish today descended from its inhabitants
	Dugualla	Dugualla Bay	Low class village

== Culture ==
=== Lifestyle ===
The lifestyle of the Swinomish, like other Indigenous peoples of the Northwest Coast, is highly reliant on the usage of marine resources, such as salmon fishing and shellfish gathering. They reserved the right to fish and harvest in their usual and accustomed areas in the Point Elliott Treaty of 1855. In pre-colonial times, as much as 70% percent of their food came from marine resources. The traditional fishing methods of the Swinomish included using traps that led fish from deep water into the shallows where they could be easily collected. This kind of trap was used by the Swinomish at Dugualla Bay, Turner Bay, along the North Fork of the Skagit River, and all along the Swinomish Channel.

Today, the Swinomish continue to be involved heavily in the fishing industry. Although some usage of traditional fishing methods continues, the majority of fishing is commercial. Through the Swinomish Tribe, they have been engaged in conflicts with the federal government over fishing rights. Most Swinomish are dependent on fishing, farm labor, or lumbering as income. Others make their income as craftspeople, selling Native arts and crafts.

The Swinomish traditionally used clam gardens to farm clams. In 2022, the Swinomish Tribe built the first clam garden in the United States in 200 years.

The Swinomish also traditionally gathered berries and roots, and, after the introduction of potatoes, they became part of the Swinomish diet.

In pre-colonial times, the Swinomish were semi-migratory. In the summer, Swinomish people travelled to fishing and gathering sites near their villages.

By 1883, much of the population of the Swinomish Reservation had turned to logging, milling, and farming. Around three-fourths had made the switch, with the remainder still living engaged in traditional subsistence patterns.

The primary watergoing vessel for much of Swinomish history has been the canoe. Although modern motorized watercraft are the mainly utilized vehicle now, canoes still carry a high degree of cultural significance and are used at cultural events. The Swinomish canoes are similar to those of other Coast Salish peoples. Saltwater canoes are traditionally decorated at the prow and can be up to fifty feet long.

=== Religion ===
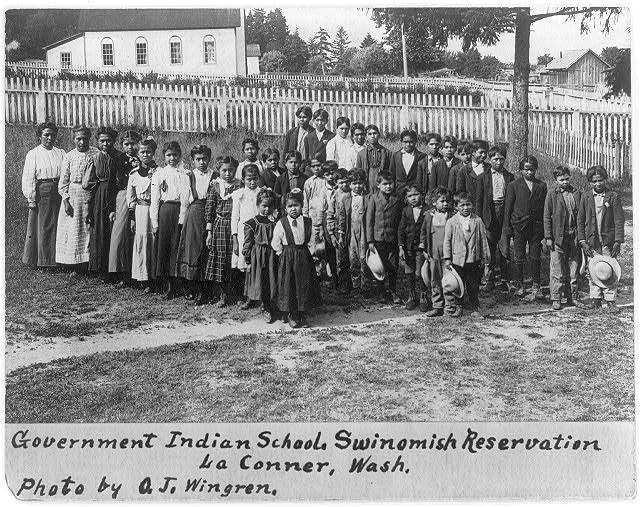
Students and teachers at the Swinomish Day School, 1907.

After colonization, many Swinomish converted to Christianity. One of the prominent denominations of the Swinomish was historically the Indian Shaker Church. A Shaker church was built on the Swinomish Reservation in 1939, but individuals practiced privately in their homes since 1910. Protestantism was introduced to the Swinomish in 1894 after the establishment of the Swinomish Day School, a boarding school operated by the federal government.

Today, most members of the Swinomish Tribe are Catholic.

=== Language ===
The language of the Swinomish is Lushootseed. Historically, the language has also been known as "Skagit." According to their tradition, their language originated with the Kikiallus, from whence the Swinomish and other Skagit-speaking peoples migrated.

In historic times, many also spoke Chinook Jargon, a trade language used for communication between settlers and Indigenous peoples in the 19th century.

The Swinomish people speak a subdialect of the Northern dialect of the Lushootseed language.

== Society ==
=== Pre-colonial society ===
Traditional Swinomish society was organized on the village and family level. Each village was composed of several families and their leaders, who had a certain standing among others of the village due to their material wealth and social prestige. However, none of these important members of a village had complete control over the rest of the village.

== Notable Swinomish ==
- Brian Cladoosby, former chairman of the Swinomish Tribe and 21st president of the National Congress of American Indians.
- Matika Wilbur, Tulalip citizen, educator, and photographer
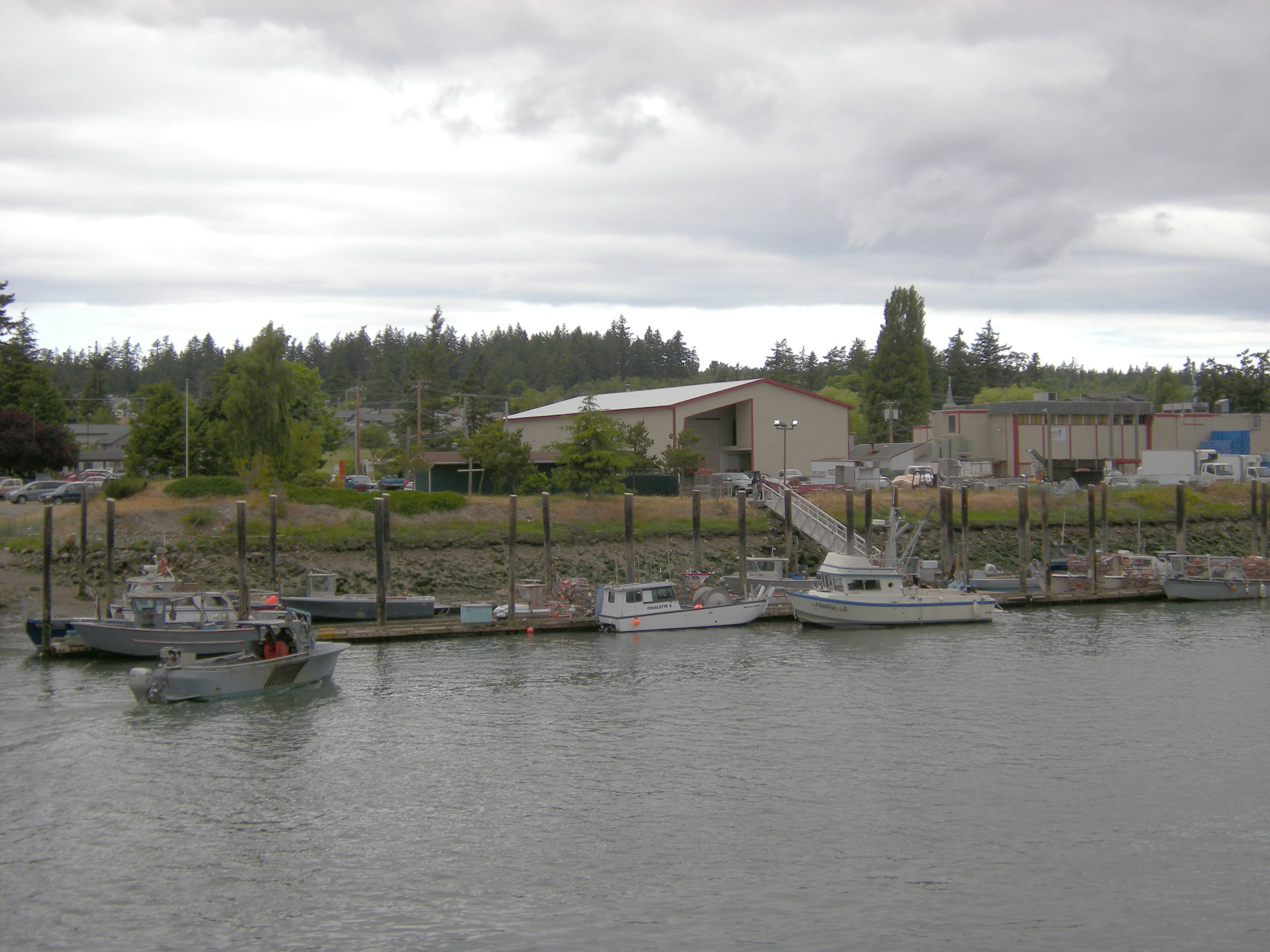
La Conner, Washington

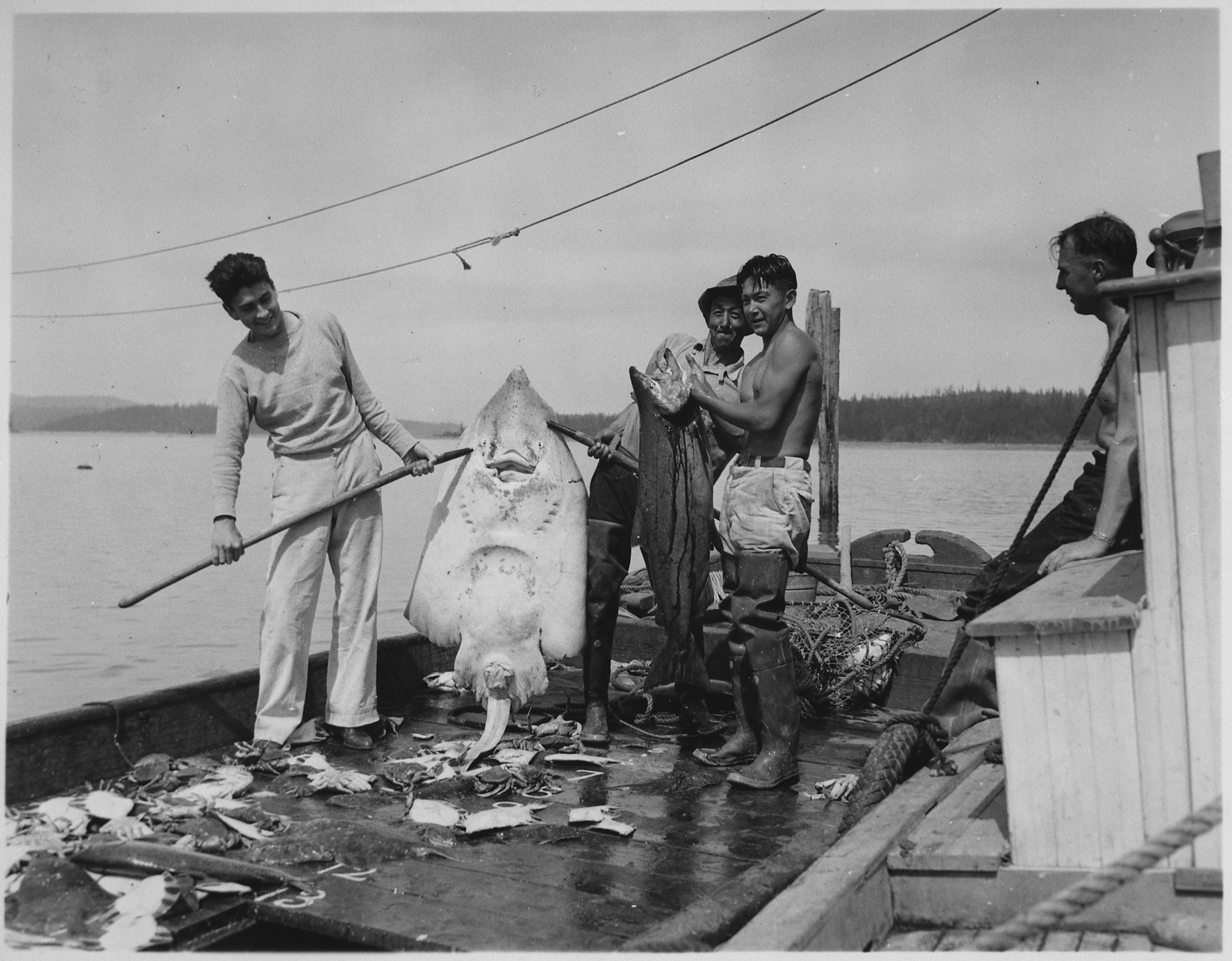
A skate from the Swinomish fishtrap, Tulalip Indian Agency, Washington, 1938
