= Rainbow Bridge (La Conner, Washington) =

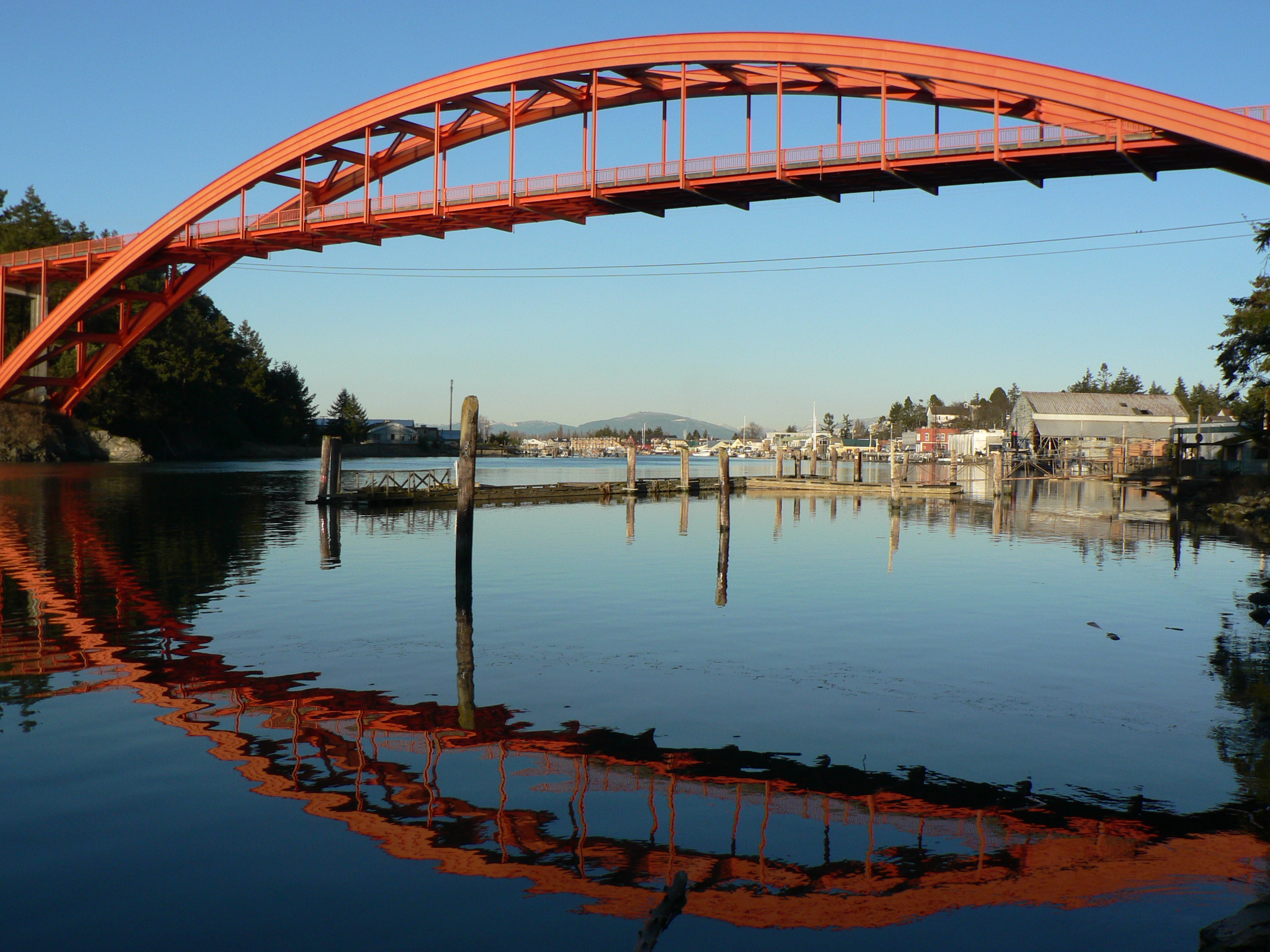
- Coordinates: 48.3868°N 122.5023°W
- Crosses: Swinomish Channel
- Locale: La Conner

Characteristics
- Design: Arch bridge
- Material: Steel
- Total length: 242.90 metres (796.9 ft)
- Longest span: 176.80 metres (580.1 ft)

History
- Opened: 1957

Rainbow Bridge connects Fidalgo Island and La Conner, crossing Swinomish Channel in Skagit County, Washington.

This is a deck arch bridge made of steel, built in 1957, with a total length of 242.90 metres (796.9 ft) and a main span of 176.80 metres (580.1 ft). There is 75 feet (23 m) of clearance below the bridge, above Swinomish Channel

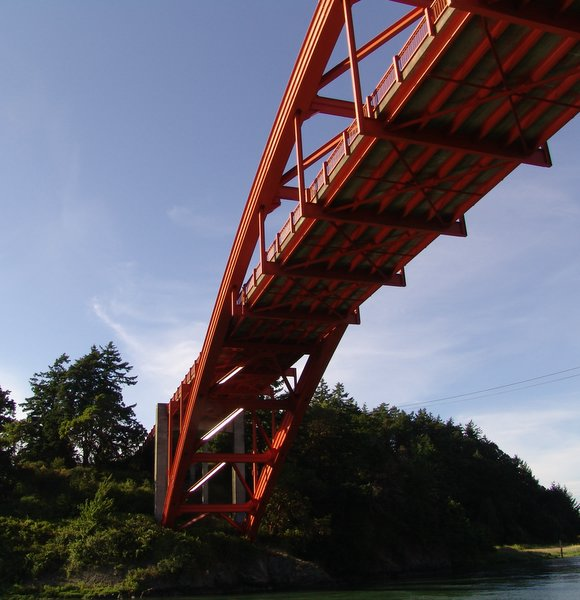
Under the Rainbow Bridge
