= Clam garden =

Mariculture food production method

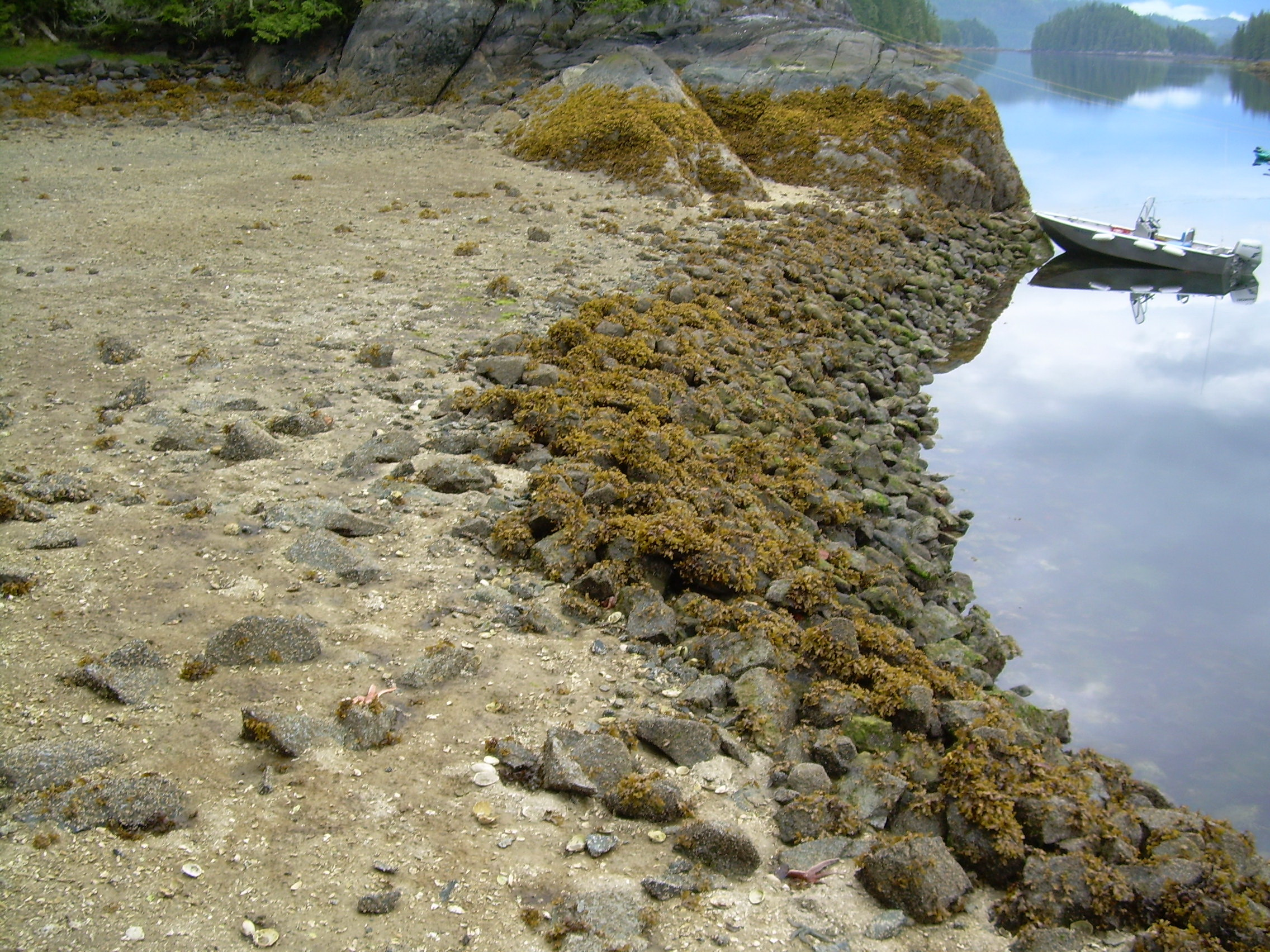
Clam garden in the Broughton Archipelago

A clam garden (k'yuu kudhlk'aat'iija in the Haida language, lux̌ʷxiwēys in the Kwakʼwala language) is a traditional Indigenous management system used principally by Coast Salish peoples. Clam gardens are a form of mariculture, where First Nations peoples created an optimal habitat for clams by modifying the beach. These clam gardens are a food source for both First Nations peoples and animals. They also provide food security as they are a food source that can be readily harvested year-round.

Clam gardens are found along the west coast of North America. Over 2,000 clam gardens have been identified on the coast of Alaska, British Columbia, Washington and California. Though most clam gardens are currently untended, restoration of sections of previously untended clam gardens are occurring in Fulford Harbour on Salt Spring Island and on Russell Island located in the Gulf Islands National Park Reserve.

== Composition ==
=== Boulder wall ===
Once a location was chosen by an individual or a group of First Nations peoples, clam garden construction began with the creation of a boulder or rock wall along the shoreline of a beach. Strong individuals would roll large boulders down to the lowest tideline on the beach, thus creating a rock wall. The rising tide brings sediment over the rock walls, where it accumulates and creates an extended soft sediment beach area, creating ideal clam habitat. The rock wall is low enough that it allows the clam garden to be submerged at high tide, but tall enough that the beach is exposed for harvesting during low tide.

Due to weather and the movement of tides, rock walls require continual maintenance. Historically, clam gardens were regularly tended to by First Nations individuals who moved rocks from inside the clam gardens onto the rock wall. Both archaeological evidence and traditional knowledge assert that boulder walls were built up over time and continually maintained. New rocks were regularly added to the top of the boulder wall when First Nations peoples harvested the clam beds.

=== Sediment ===
The accumulation of sediment trapped by the boulder wall creates a flatter beach, which is an optimal growing habitat for clams. This sediment has an optimal density for clam growth, free from fine clay and silt particles that are washed away by the high tide.

The density of the sediment was also due to the process of aerating the sand while clams were harvested. Many clam gardens also have a high amount of gravel and shell hash, which aid in aerating the sand. This density allows for freer movement of clams, in addition to easier removal of clams from the sediment.

=== Animals ===
Clam gardens are an ideal habitat for many animals. The modified beach attracts growth of many clams, notably: butter, littleneck, cockle and horse clams. Animals such as barnacles, chiton, snails, crabs, eels, mussels, octopus, urchin, and sea cucumbers also live in clam gardens. Other animals such as ghost shrimp and worms are found buried in the loose sediment.

== Usage ==
=== Food source ===
Clam gardens were an intertidal food source for many Indigenous peoples on the Pacific Northwest Coast (including Coast Salish peoples), and provided food security to many diverse First Nation communities. Clam Gardens facilitated an abundance of clams that could be readily harvested and accessible during low tides. While everyone in the community participated, women and children were heavily involved in the harvesting activity. Once collected, families could consume the clams immediately or smoke them to be preserved for later use. During winter, clams harvested from clam gardens were important since they served as sustenance when other foods were scarce or difficult to access. Some nations, such as the Kwakwaka'wakw nation, traditionally harvested clams from October to early March so as to avoid the red tide which can be associated with Paralytic Shellfish poisoning.

Although Clam gardens were created by people, these intertidal features also served as a habitat and source for various animals during the spring or summer, including mammals (raccoons, mink, river otters, bears) and birds (sea ducks, and geese) and a host of invertebrates.

=== Knowledge transmission ===
Traditional clam harvesting also allowed for intergenerational knowledge transmission, with Elders passing down knowledge about clam gardens to the next generation. Clam gardens were similar to an outdoor classroom, where traditional knowledge, language and cultural practices could be enacted by the community.

=== Ownership ===
Each Nation has specific protocols and governance systems around resource management, and many access areas are family-based. For clam gardens, families often asserted ownership by regularly tending to the beach and maintaining the rock wall. These clam gardens were stewarded for the next generation. Historically, unmanaged clam gardens could be harvested by anyone in the community. Families could claim ownership by building their own clam garden on an undeveloped beach area in their traditional territory.

== Historical age ==
The exact age of the origin of clam gardening is unknown but current archaeological evidence indicates these features date back at least 3500–3800 years ago but accurately dating clam gardens is difficult given the rock wall is often underwater, and has been subjected to boat wakes, storm surges, and rising sea levels.

Archaeologists are studying the ages of clam gardens using methods such as optically stimulated luminescence of sand grains and radiocarbon dating of barnacles attached to cobbles at the base of the rock walls. Scholars are using both methods to gain a better understanding of the age of clam gardens. The evidence from various sites in the Salish Sea suggests walls were built up by communities over time. Some dating results suggest that clam gardens range from 1000 to 1700 years old, whereas other samples indicate that they date back to at least 3500 to 3800 years ago.

Conversely, many First Nations peoples have a different perspective of clam garden creation. For example, Clan Chief Adam Dick, Kwaxsistalla of the Kwakwaka'wakw nation, states that clam gardens have been around "since the beginning of time". Tom Sewid, a native watchman of the Mamalilikulla-Qwe'Qwa'Sot'Em nation, states that his ancestors have maintained clam gardens over "thousands of years", citing clam gardens as proof of title to his traditional lands.

== Restoration ==
"The Clam Garden Network", a loose affiliation of academics, researchers and First Nations groups, was formed to share current research and traditional First Nations practices related to clam garden management.

In 2014, restoration work began to revive two clam gardens in the Gulf Islands National Park Reserve in a project between Parks Canada and the Hul'q'umi'num and W̱SÁNEĆ Nations.

The Swinomish Tribe of Washington built a new clam garden on Kiket Island in 2022. It is believed to be the first clam garden built in the United States in over 200 years.

== See also ==
- Indigenous peoples of the Pacific Northwest
- Potlatch
