= Brian Cladoosby =

Native American leader and activist

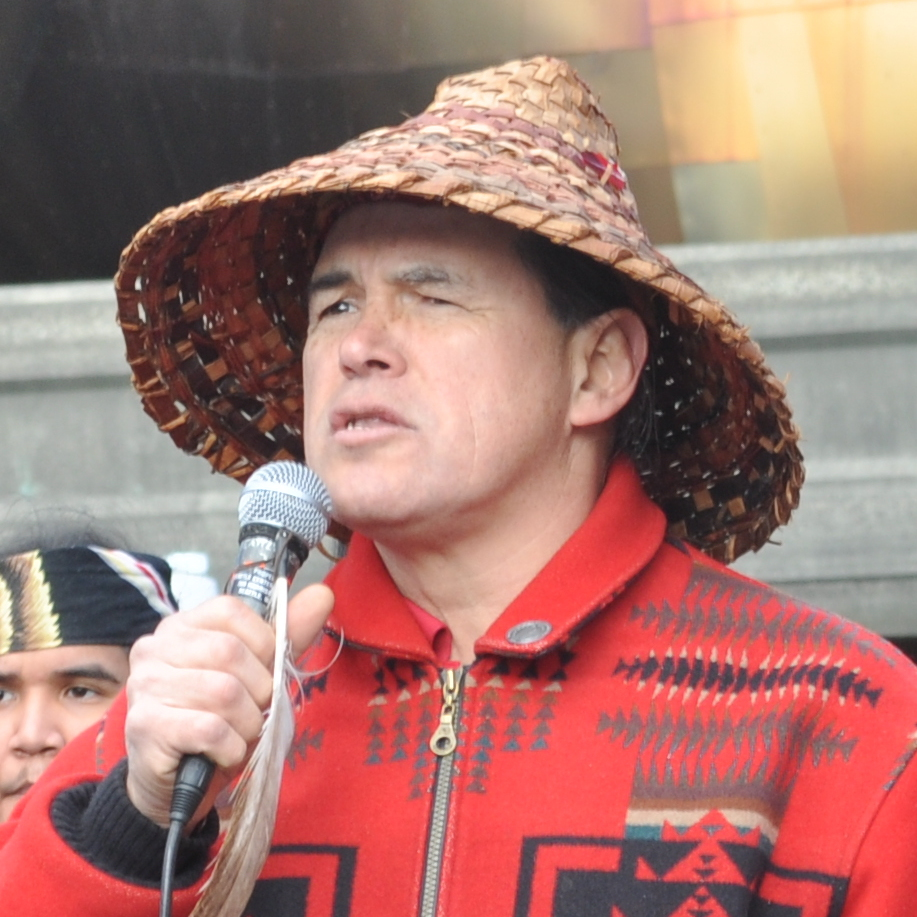
- Cladoosby at the raising of the John T. Williams Memorial Totem Pole, Seattle Center, February 26, 2012

21st President of National Congress of American Indians
- In office October 2013 – October 2017
- Preceded by: Jefferson Keel
- Succeeded by: Jefferson Keel

Chairman of Swinomish Indian Tribal Community
- In office 1997–2020
- Preceded by: Robert Wayne Joe Sr.
- Succeeded by: Steve Edwards

Personal details
- Born: May 13, 1959 (age 67) Skagit County, Washington, U.S.
- Spouse: Nina Cladoosby
- Children: 2
- Education: Skagit Valley College

Brian Cladoosby (born May 13, 1959) is a Native American leader and activist. He served as chairman of the Swinomish Indian Tribal Community from 1997 to 2020 and was elected to his first of two terms as president of the National Congress of American Indians in October 2013. He previously served as president of the Affiliated Tribes of Northwest Indians.

As president of NCAI, he introduced President Obama at a White House Tribal Nations Conference and was a guest at the state dinner given for the president of France.

Cladoosby is an active defender of tribal sovereignty, treaty rights and the environment. Cladoosby has been a staunch opponent of the Dakota Access Pipeline.

During his tenure as Swinomish chairman, the tribe became one of the largest employers in Skagit County, its police department was granted authority by the state to enforce state law, and health care was expanded to include dental care by dental health therapists, the equivalent of a physician assistant (PA-C). The tribe's didgwalic Wellness Center provides outpatient addiction treatment and is open to the general community. The Swinomish Tribe hosted the 2011 Canoe Journey.

On February 9, 2020, Cladoosby lost his reelection bid for the Swinomish Tribal Senate to Alana Quintasket. Then, in a vote by the Tribal senate on March 9, 2020, his seat as Swinomish chairman was lost to Tribal recreation director and senator Steve Edwards. Following his defeat in the March election, Cladoosby was widely recognized for his tenure and accomplishments by the Swinomish Senate, prominent local officials, and by Washington State governor Jay Inslee.
