= Lower Skagit =

Native American tribe

Total population
- 300 (1855)

Regions with significant populations
- United States (Washington)

Languages
- English, Lushootseed

Religion
- Christianity, Indigenous

Related ethnic groups
- other Coast Salish peoples

The Lower Skagit (sometimes called Whidbey Island Skagits) are a tribe of the Lushootseed Native American people living in the U.S. state of Washington. Today they are enrolled in the federally recognized tribe, the Swinomish Indians of the Swinomish Reservation.

== History ==
=== Pre-contact ===
In pre-Contact times, the tribe occupied approximately 56,300 acres (228 km^{2}) of land, including land on central Whidbey Island from Dugula Bay south to Holmes Harbor (including sites at Maylor Point, Penn Cove and Coupeville), as well as sites on the mainland around the mouth of the Skagit River. The Lower Skagit had conflicts with Haida from the north, who would raid their camps to take slaves, as well as Klallam from the other side of the Puget Sound, who tried to occupy their lands. Like other Coast Salish tribes, the Lower Skagit were semi-sedentary. Their lives revolved around the food they could harvest from the sea, such as salmon, through use of fish weirs, as well as nets dragged between two canoes, and hunting duck, seals and deer. This diet was supplemented by gathering of a wide variety of nuts and fruits, as well as cultivation of camas roots, nettles, bracken, and after European contact, potatoes.

=== Post-contact ===
During the fur trading era, the Lower Skagit were active in trading at posts of the Hudson's Bay Company. By the 1840s, Roman Catholic missionaries like François Blanchet Jean-Baptiste Bolduc were trying to convert the Lower Skagit to their beliefs. During the United States Exploring Expedition, the explorer Charles Wilkes made contact in 1841 with the people. He found the Lower Skagit building a Catholic church.

In January 1855, a Lower Skagit chief named Goliah signed the Treaty of Point Elliott, by which the United States established reservations for numerous coastal tribes. The estimated 300 tribal members were put under jurisdiction of the Tulalip Agency. In September 1873, an executive order moved the tribe, along with members of the Swinomish and other tribes, to the Swinomish Reservation on Fidalgo Island in Skagit County, Washington.

In the twentieth century, the tribe pursued a land claim against the federal government because of receiving inadequate settlement. On October 13, 1971, the Indian Claims Commission ordered US$74,856.50 to be paid to the Lower Skagit to cover the amount of land that they had lost as a result of the Point Elliott Treaty.

== Swinomish Reservation ==
The Swinomish Indian Reservation has a land area of 31.381 km^{2} (12.116 sq mi) and a 2000 census resident population of 2,664 persons. About 23 percent identified as being solely of Native American heritage. Like many other elements of American society, the tribe has a long history of intermarriage with other ethnic groups, but children of the tribe identify as Lower Skagit. Today, Lower Skagit members who live on the reservation are primarily commercial fishers by trade.

== Language ==
The Lower Skagit language is a subdialect of the Northern Lushootseed dialect.

== See also ==
- Upper Skagit tribe

== Sources ==
- Bennett, Lee Ann. Effects of White Contact on the Lower Skagit Indians, Seattle: Washington Archaeological Society, 1972.
- Ruby, Robert H.; John A. Brown (1986). A Guide to the Indian Tribes of the Pacific Northwest, The Civilization of the American Indian. University of Oklahoma Press. ISBN 0-8061-2479-2. pages 107–109.
- Jan Halliday;Gail Chehak. Native Peoples of the Northwest: A Traveler's Guide to Land, Art, and Culture, Sasquatch Books, 1996, p. 74.
- Van Eijk, Jan. The Lillooet Language: Phonology, Morphology, Syntax, UBC Press, 1985, p.xxiv.
- Idaho State University Museum. Occasional Papers of the Idaho State University Museum, 1958.
