= Swinomish Reservation =

Indian reservation in Washington state

Coordinates: 48°25′15″N 122°31′40″W

Swinomish Indian Reservation
- Indian Reservation
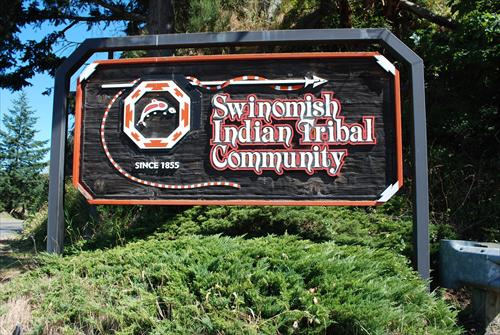
- Sign at the entrance to the Swinomish Reservation

- Location of the Swinomish Reservation in Washington state
- Treaty: 1855
- Named for: Swinomish people

Government
  - Type: Federally-recognized tribe
  - Body: Swinomish Senate
  - Chair: Steve Edwards

Area
  - Total: 39 km^{2} (15 sq mi)

Population (2020)
  - Total: 3,228

The Swinomish Indian Reservation is the reservation of the Swinomish Indian Tribal Community, located on Fidalgo Island in western Washington state. The western boundary of the reservation is disputed between the Swinomish Tribe and the United States government. De facto, the reservation is around 15 square miles (39 km^{2}; 9,600 acres) in size. It comprises a substantial portion of the eastern portion of Fidalgo Island. The total reservation population in 2000 was 2,664.

== History ==
The Swinomish Reservation was established in 1855 by the Treaty of Point Elliott. The signatory tribes ceded their land to the United States in return for the guarantee of their rights, including that of the reservation and self-government. The 1855 treaty recorded the land on which the reservation was founded as being called "shais-quihl." The reservation comprises a large part of eastern Fidalgo Island. The eastern boundary of the reservation is Swinomish Channel.

The reservation was initially created under the Tulalip Agency, which was assigned to the Catholic Church under Ulysses S. Grant's policy.

=== Boundary dispute ===
The western boundary of the Swinomish Reservation is disputed by the Swinomish Tribe and the United States government. The Swinomish Tribe asserts that the reservation comprises all lands on Fidalgo Island west of the Swinomish Golf Course, including March’s Point. Contemporary maps show the western boundary of the reservation as being a north–south line between Similk and Fidalgo bays.

In 1873, the president of the United States, Ulysses S. Grant, issued an executive order which adjusted the borders of the reservation. The United States Supreme Court has repeatedly ruled that only Congress can reduce the size of reservations, not a sitting president. The Swinomish Tribe has called this act an "unlawful attempt to take a portion of the reservation" and a violation of the Treaty of Point Elliott.

=== Railway dispute ===
In 1889, the Seattle and Northern Railroad Company illegally constructed a rail line on Swinomish lands, crossing sensitive marine ecosystems. Today, the line is operated by the BNSF Railway Company. A 1991 easement agreement with BNSF prohibits the company from running trains at a limit of 25 cars per day, as well as requiring BNSF to disclose "nature and identity" of all cargo.

In 2011, the Swinomish Tribe discovered that BNSF had begun illegally transporting crude oil to the March Point oil refinery without disclosing it to the tribe. The Swinomish Tribe inadvertently found out when viewing Skagit County planning documents. A year later, BNSF sent the Swinomish Tribe documents disclosing the additional cargo. Although the Swinomish Tribe never approved the change in cargo, BNSF continued transporting 100-car trains of crude oil through the reservation. BNSF stated that they had a reasonable obligation to provide oil to their customers.

On March 16, 2023, the BNSF spilled 3,100 gallons of diesel onto the reservation after a train derailment. The train that derailed was running 100 cars carrying crude oil. The Supreme Court found that, from 2012 to 2021, the BNSF secretly increased the number of cars they would run across the reservation without the tribe's consent "in pursuit of profits.

On June 17, 2024, BNSF was ordered to pay $395 million for the use of the tracks without permission.

== Geography ==
The Swinomish Reservation is roughly 15 square miles (39 km^{2}; 9,600 acres) in size, 7,450 acres (3,010 ha) of which are upland and 2,900 acres (1,200 ha) of which are tidelands.

=== Allotments ===
In 1950, 5,395 acres (2,183 ha) of the reservation were allotted. Forty acres (16 ha) were unalotted, and 85 were reserved by the federal government. By 1978, 3,430 acres (1,390 ha) remained in allotments, while 263 acres (106 ha) were tribally-owned.

== Demographics ==
The Swinomish reservation has a population of 3,228 according to the 2020 United States census.
