= Nuwhaha =

Indigenous people in Washington state, U.S.

dxʷʔaha

Total population
- merged into the Upper Skagit Indian Tribe, Swinomish Indian Tribal Community, and the Samish Indian Nation

Regions with significant populations
- Washington

Languages
- Lushootseed

Religion
- Indigenous religion

Related ethnic groups
- Other Lushootseed-speaking peoples, such as the Upper Skagit peoples; Samish people, Nooksack people

The Nuwhaha (noo-WAH-hah; Lushootseed: dxʷʔaha) were a historical Lushootseed-speaking people in the Skagit River valley of Washington. The Nuwhaha primarily lived along the Samish River, as well as the coastal areas between Bay View and Bellingham.

The Nuwhaha were a powerful and warlike people, but smallpox epidemics devastated them in the 18th and 19th centuries. Eventually, they were pushed inland by wars with the Samish people. In 1855, the Nuwhaha were a signatory to the Treaty of Point Elliott.

Today, Nuwhaha descendants are members of the Upper Skagit Indian Tribe, Swinomish Indian Tribal Community, and the Samish Indian Nation. Descendants of one Nuwhaha man, George Bob, are enrolled in the Nooksack Indian Tribe. Although there is no distinct Nuwhaha entity today, some Nuwhaha descendants enrolled in federally recognized tribes still maintain their traditional identity as Nuwhaha.

== Name ==
The Nuwhaha are also erroneously called the Upper Samish (and they should not be confused with the Samish people, who speak the North Straits language). Stick Samish was another name historically used to refer to the Nuwhaha by White settlers. Other settlers called the Nuwhaha "flatheads", as most Indians in western Washington often called due to their head-flattening practices. Nuwhaha has also been spelled Nuwha'ha, Noo-wha-ha, Noo-wha-ah, Nuwaha, and Duwaha.

Their endonym in Lushootseed is dxʷʔaha.

== Classification ==
The Nuwhaha were a Lushootseed-speaking Coast Salish people, a group of culturally and linguistically related peoples in the Salish Sea. Although they were historically independent, they have been classified variously by anthropologists and historians as a part of the Lower Skagit, Upper Skagit, or even Samish.

Legally, the Indian Claims Commission found that the Nuwhaha were separate from the aboriginal Upper Skagit peoples, however, the modern Upper Skagit Indian Tribe maintains that it is the political successor to the Nuwhaha.

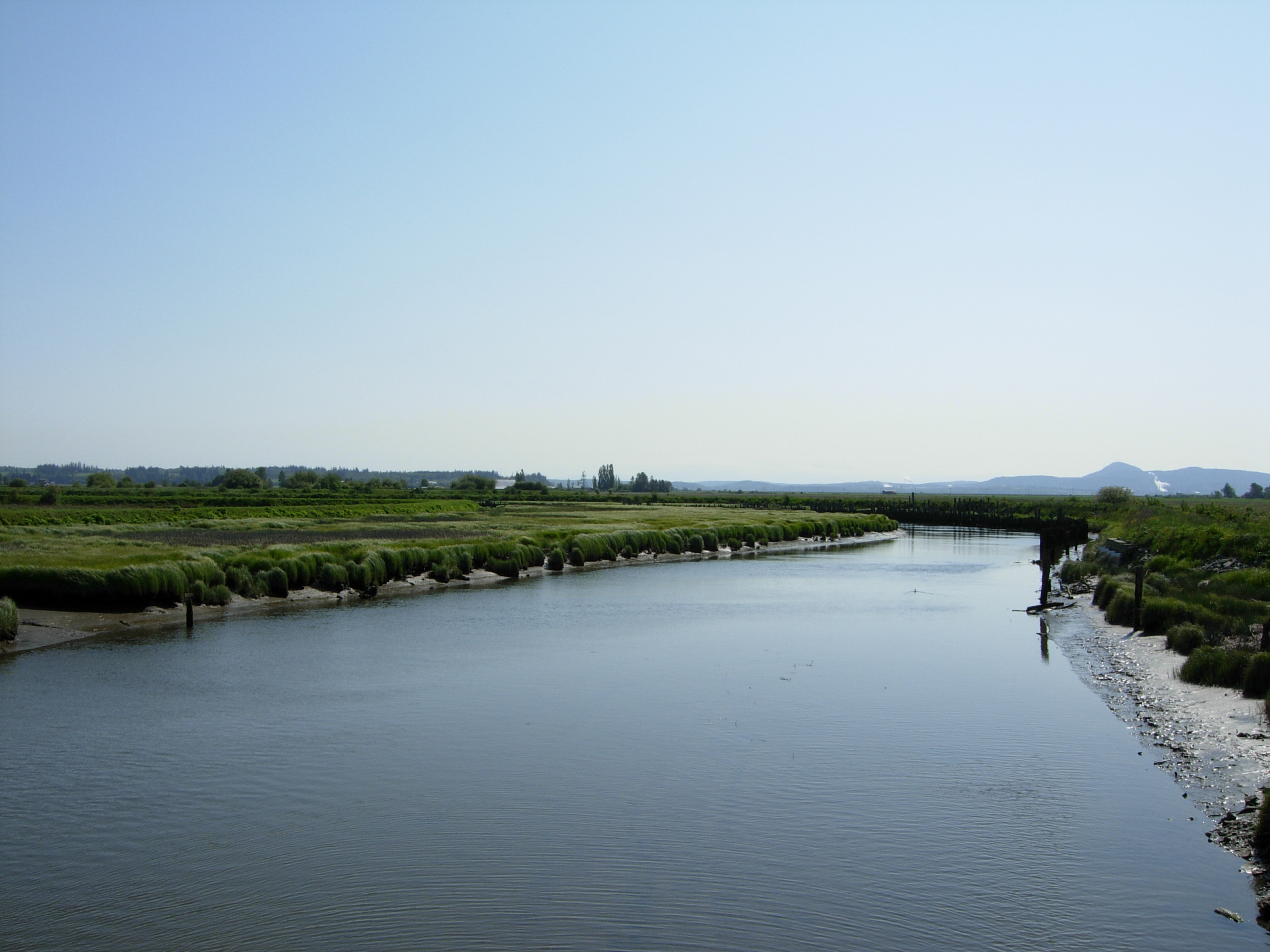
The Samish River was the heart of Nuwhaha territory

== Territory and villages ==
The Nuwhaha were located north of the Skagit River, with their villages primarily located along the Samish River and nearby areas. Due to their proximity to the Upper Skagit peoples, they maintained close ties with the neighboring peoples of the Skagit River. Nuwhaha territory included two large prairies, now called Jarman (or German) Prairie, Warner's Prairie, and Young Prairie, where women would go to harvest roots. In total, the Nuwhaha once occupied a swath of land from Bellingham to Bay View, including Lake Samish and parts of Lake Whatcom. The exact north–south boundaries differ according to different records. According to Susie Sampson Peter, Skagit storyteller, the Nuwhaha once controlled the area from Samish Island to Whatcom Creek. According to her son, Swinomish historian Martin Sampson, the Nuwhaha once had the area from south of Bay View to Bellingham Bay, at the Nooksack River.

The Nuwhaha also occupied Chuckanut Bay, Samish Bay and Bellingham Bay, alongside the Nooksack, Samish, and Lummi peoples. They had two large forts, one at the mouth of the Samish River that could defend against invaders, and one at a high, rocky hill on Jarman Prairie, to which warriors would retreat in case the first fort became overwhelmed.

Nuwhaha villages were generally built around fishing sites. The Nuwhaha had several villages in the vicinity of the Samish River:

List of known Nuwhaha villages
Name	Anglicization(s) or Alternative names	Location	Notes	References
bəsɬaʔɬaʔus	Baslatlaus	Bay View, Padilla Bay	Two longhouses	
dxʷʔəčuʔb	Duwachubub	On Edison Creek near Bow	Chadaskadim was from this village	
		Belfast, on Friday Creek	One longhouse. Wiped out by a smallpox epidemic in the 1830s.	
		Jarman Prairie, on the Samish River	Wiped out by a smallpox epidemic in the 1830s.	
	Hacubthluk	Warner Prairie	The headman of this village was Statileius, also known as "Mowitch Man".	
		South end of Lake Samish	One longhouse	
sx̌ačuʔabš (Note: The Nooksack language-name of this village was X̠achu7ámish)	Lake People	Lake Whatcom, near Park (likely at Fir Creek)	Mixed Nuwhaha-Nooksack village. Sometimes considered as independent from the Nooksack and Nuwhaha. Last occupied around 1860.	

== History ==
=== 18th century ===
The Nuwhaha were struck by epidemics which arrived starting in the 18th century. The first epidemic left many remaining on the lakes and prairies, who were less affected due to their inland residencies.

The first Europeans to record their encounter with the Nuwhaha were the crew of the José María Narváez and the Santa Saturnina around 1791. When they arrived in what they called the "Seno de Padilla" (Padilla Bay), they could see many people who were gathering shellfish, likely from the village bəsɬaʔɬaʔus.

=== 19th century ===
According to Martin Sampson, the Nuwhaha were a large, powerful, and warlike tribe prior to the arrival of Europeans. In the early 19th century, under the leadership of Chadaskadim I (Lushootseed: č̓adəsqidəb) and Chadaskadim II, (Note: Also č̓adəsqidəb) they made war on peoples as far south as the Puyallup, and reaching as far north as Vancouver Island. At some point, the Saanich invaded the territory of the Nuwhaha, killing Chadaskadim II and taking his head back to what is now Sidney. In retaliation, the Nuwhaha, led by a man named Sathill, invaded the Saanich at Sidney, in an effort to repatriate the head of Chadaskadim II. The invasion was not successful, as although they had burned all the houses at Sidney, only a few were killed, they were able to take no slaves, and the head was not returned. According to tradition, the head of Chadaskadim II still remained somewhere in Sidney in 1972. The descendants of Chadaskadim II include members of the Swinomish Reservation, as well as the historian Ruth Sehome Shelton from Tulalip, while the descendants of Sathill include other Swinomish residents such as the Sampson family. Eventually, the Nuwhaha were pushed further inland by incursions from the Samish.

In the 1830s, the Nuwhaha were decimated by another epidemic. The epidemic reached every village, and reduced the Nuwhaha population to around 200 (from 1,000 pre-epidemic). One man from the village near Bow went to visit his relatives at the Jarman Prairie village. He found all the occupants dead, save for his baby niece, who he found still in her mother's arms. After placing her in a shelter away from the village, he burned the houses. He also found all the occupants of the Friday Creek village dead, and burned that one as well. After burning his clothing and the clothing of his niece, they returned together to a shelter near his village, where they were quarantined in a shelter. After they had washed for several days, surely free of smallpox, they returned to his village at Bow.

On January 22, 1855, the Nuwhaha were party to the Treaty of Point Elliott. Pateus, (Note: Spelled "Pat-teh-us" on the treaty; also spelled Pattehus) a famous Nuwhaha leader from the Bay View village (who was described as a "sub-chief" of the Nuwhaha by the treaty commission), signed the treaty for the Nuwhaha. (Note: The name "Nuwhaha" was spelled variously "Noo-wha-ha" and "Noo-wha-ah" by the treaty commission.) Pateus, whose wife was Samish, was also one of the men authorized by the United States to sign the treaty for the Samish people. The Nuwhaha were intended to be removed to the Lummi Reservation, although they generally did not move there.

During treaty times, some Nuwhaha were organized around the prophet Stababutkin, alongside the Upper Skagit. Stababutkin himself was the son-in-law of Pateus.

In 1866, Indian agents reported a Nuwhaha population of 90, about half of whom had converted to Christianity, although it is unknown if the reports included all Nuwhaha or just those living on the Lummi Reservation. In 1867, some Nuwhaha had reportedly tried to join the Lummi at the Lummi Reservation, but in 1870, agent C.C. Finkbonner reported the Nuwhaha were "persistently refus[ing]" removal to the Lummi Reservation. A reservation around the Samish River was considered, but never established.

Around 1890, some Nuwhaha moved to the Swinomish Reservation, while others joined the Upper Skagit communities. Some Nuwhaha moved to the Samish settlement on Guemes Island, which remained until c. 1905. After its abandonment, the residents moved primarily to the Swinomish Reservation. At least five Nuwhaha families filed for homesteads in the area.

=== 20th century ===
By 1918, the Nuwhaha living along the Samish River largely had assimilated into the Upper Skagits, while coastal Nuwhaha were assimilated into the Samish. In the early 1900s, the Nuwhaha were represented both by the Anacortes (Samish) and Upper Skagit sections of the Northwest Federation of American Indians, which sued for claims in the Indian Claims Commission.

In 1951, a new organization was formed by a combination of Samish, Nuwhaha, and others (both on and off reservations) to be the successor to the Anacortes Branch, in order to represent the Samish claims going forward. This organization sued for federal recognition in 1972, eventually winning to become the Samish Indian Nation. In 1982, twenty-two percent of the membership of the tribe was of Nuwhaha descent.

In 1977, there was a short-lived attempt by Nuwhaha descendants in reservation communities to form a separate Noowhaha Tribe and seek federal recognition.

== Culture ==
The Nuwhaha spoke the Lushootseed language, the same as their Upper Skagit neighbors.

== See also ==
- Upper Skagit Indian Tribe
- List of Lushootseed-speaking peoples
