= Samish =

The Samish people are a Central Coast Salish people, who live in the U.S. state of Washington. It may also refer to:

== Places ==
- Lake Samish in Whatcom County
- Samish Bay in Puget Sound
- Samish River
- Samish Island, Washington, an unincorporated community in Skagit County

== Other ==
- Samish Indian Nation
- Arthur Samish (1897–1974), American lobbyist
- MV Samish, a ferry in Washington State
- Samish dialect, a dialect of the North Straits Salish language
