= Upper Skagit Indian Tribe =

Federally-recognized Indian Tribe in Washington state

Upper Skagit Indian Tribe sqaǰətabš
- Location of the Upper Skagit Indian Tribe
- Headquarters: Sedro-Wooley, Washington
- Religion: Christianity (Catholicism; Pentecostalism; Indian Shaker Church); Indigenous folk religion
- Demonym: Upper Skagit
- Enrolled members: 1,031 (2008)

Domestic dependent nation within the United States
- Website upperskagittribe-nsn.gov

The Upper Skagit Indian Tribe (Lushootseed: sqaǰətabš) is a federally-recognized Indian tribe located in the U.S. state of Washington. The tribe is the successor-in-interest to approximately eleven (Note: The Sauk-Suiattle have historically been considered a part of the Upper Skagit by some anthropologists due to their closeness. However, modern scholars separate the two groups due to the existence as a distinct tribal entity.) historic tribes (or bands) which had many permanent villages along the Skagit River in what is now Skagit County.

For thousands of years, the predecessors of the Upper Skagit Indian Tribe lived along the Skagit River, hunting, fishing, and gathering. Their territory extended from as far downstream as what is now Mount Vernon to as far upstream as Newhalem. They are related to other Coast Salish peoples, and historically spoke the Lushootseed language, a heritage language for several tribes in the Puget Sound region.

The predecessor bands to the Upper Skagit Tribe were signatory to the Treaty of Point Elliot in 1855, and ceded their land in return for a reservation and hunting, fishing, and gathering rights. Throughout the 19th century, society rapidly shifted for the Upper Skagit as their systems of governance evolved and they faced encroachment from settlers. The late 19th century was marked by land disputes as settlers and the government continued to assert power over the Upper Skagit. Although they fought for their rights as a treaty tribe, the Upper Skagit remained an unrecognized tribe until 1974, when they were recognized by the federal government. In 1981, a reservation was finally established for the Upper Skagit.

== Name ==
The tribe was initially called "The Skagit Tribe of Indians", but changed their name in 1958.

The name "Skagit" is an anglicization of the Lushootseed word sqaǰət, which refers to the Skagit people of Whidbey Island, whose territory encompassed the land around Penn Cove. "Upper Skagit" in particular refers to the peoples whose villages were located along the Skagit River and its tributaries, contrasting with the "Lower Skagit" of Whidbey island. Early settlers applied the name sqaǰət to both the Skagit proper, as well as those living along the Skagit River, creating the distinction between the "Upper" and "Lower" Skagits. In historic times, the peoples of the Skagit river would have used the term bəstuləkʷ, '(people who) have a river', to refer to themselves as a unit.

The Lushootseed word sqaǰət is composed of the nominalizing prefix s-, and the root √qaǰət, 'to hide'.

== Predecessor bands ==
The Upper Skagit Indian Tribe is descended from several aboriginal village groups (also called bands, tribes, or (extended) villages) who had villages along the Skagit River and its tributaries. These villages are counted between nine and eleven. The Sauk-Suiattle have historically been considered a part of the Upper Skagit by some anthropologists due to their closeness. However, modern scholars separate the two groups due to the existence as a distinct tribal entity.

List of village groups preceding the Upper Skagit Indian Tribe
Lushootseed name	English/anglicized name(s)	Translation	Traditional territory	Notes
dxʷʔaha	Nuwhaha		Along the Samish River (sqʷəɬqʷalič); along the coast from Padilla Bay to Lake Samish	Descendants enrolled in both Upper Skagit Indian Tribe and Samish Indian Nation.
duqʷəčabš	Nookachamps, Nookwachahmish	People of Nookachamps Creek (duqʷač)	Mount Vernon to below Sedro-Wooley; along Nookachamps Creek to Lake McMurray (qəbuʔlaɬ)	Eight house sites, sixteen winter houses.
bəsikʷigʷilc	Mesekwegwils, Bsigwigwilts, Meeseequaguilch	(People of) the big rocks	Along the Skagit River from Sterling to Minkler	Three house sites, seven winter houses
čubəʔabš	Chobaabish, Chobahahbish	People who climb the banks of the river	Lyman and the surrounding area	Two house sites, two winter houses
	Bsxwexwehwa'1, Baslohaloh		Hamilton and the surrounding area	One house site, one winter house
sbaliʔxʷ	Smaliwhu, Sabelxu, Sabaliuhk	Mixture of people	Birdsview to Faber's Ferry (qʷəq̓ʷqʷəq̓ʷ); along the Baker River (dxʷqəlb) to Baker Lake	Ten house sites, twenty-two winter houses. The largest group on the Skagit River.
sʔilayucid	Saylayotsid	Alongside the path	Rockport and the surrounding area	Four house sites, five winter houses
	Shayayotsid, Beskiotsid	People upriver from the confluence	West of Rockport, at the bend of the river (sq̓ixʷucid); Rocky Creek, west of Marblemount.	Three house sites, three winter houses
	Miskaiwhu, Skaywih	People way upriver	From Marblemount to Bacon Creek; the Cascade River drainage	Six house sites, five winter houses
	Kwabatsabsh	People upriver from the bend	From Damnation Creek to Newhalem	Three house sites, three winter houses
saʔqʷəbixʷ	Sauk	People who dig roots	Sauk and Suiattle rivers	Succeeded by the Sauk-Suiattle Indian Tribe.

== History ==
=== Oral tradition and prehistory ===
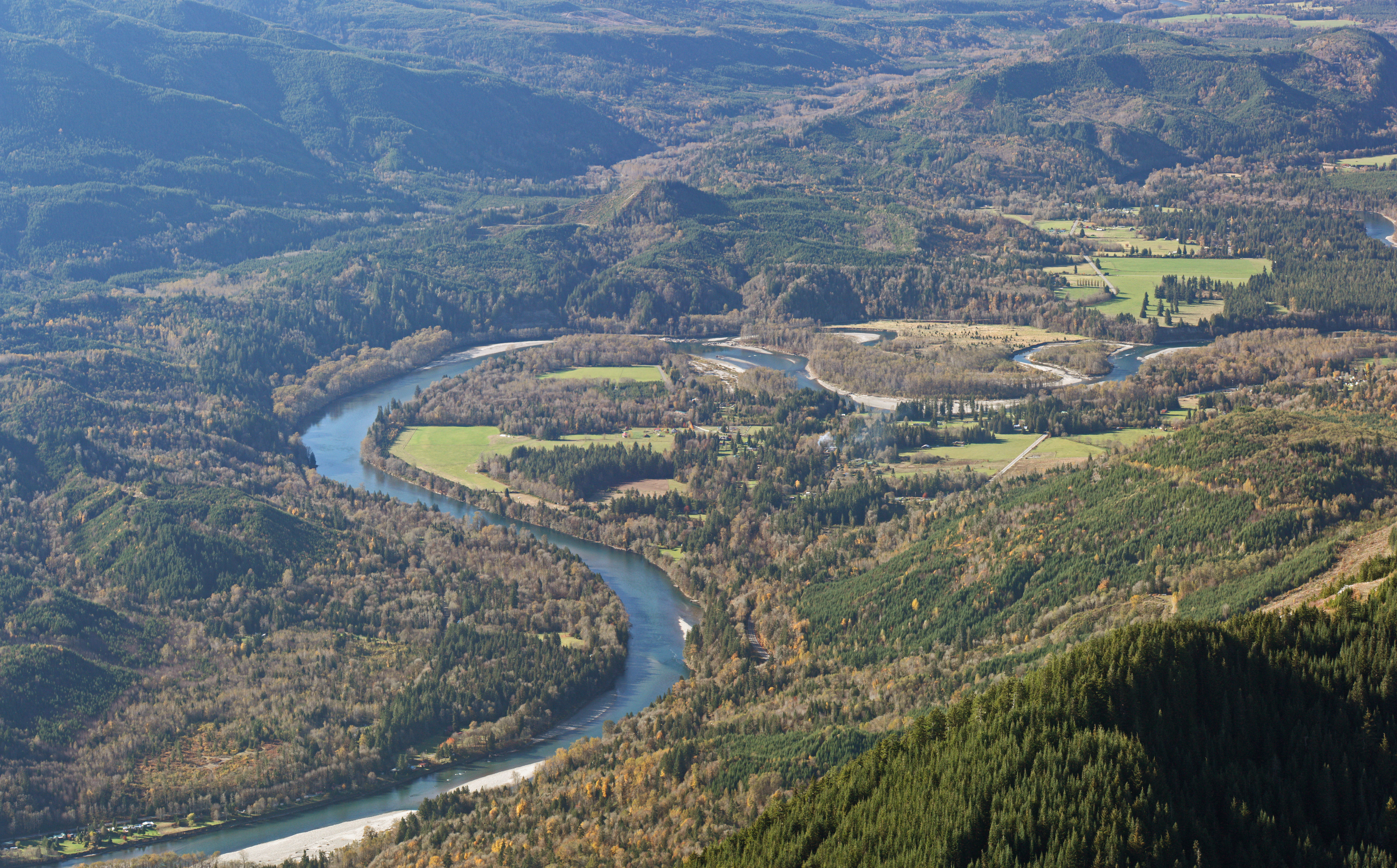
The Skagit River, homeland of the Upper Skagit Indian Tribe

According to Upper Skagit oral tradition, it was dukʷibəɬ, the culture hero of the Upper Skagit, who changed the world into how it is today. dukʷibəɬ, according to tradition, is a noble and benevolent being in the form of a man with blue eyes and white hair. He reduced the intelligence and size of animals, making it so humans could form a society. Additionally, he taught mankind craftwork and art. According to their traditions, he would at one point return once again. Others who are involved in the origin stories of the Upper Skagit include the trickster-changers: Raven, Mink, and Coyote.

The earliest humans in the Puget Sound region likely arrived roughly 12,000 years ago. Tools belonging to the old Cordilleran culture have been found, pointing to a period where humans relied primarily on big game hunting for survival. This period was possibly followed by the development of the marine culture in the Early Maritime period, which has been well-studied in the Fraser Valley region. Following this was the Intermediate period, roughly from 700 to 1250 CE. By this time, local peoples had begun utilizing both marine and inland resources. The Recent period, roughly from 1250 to 1750 CE, was categorized by the development (and continued use) of fortifications, new projectile and spear points, and new styles of fish hooks. This period led into the Historic period of the 18th century to present.

Prior to the Historic period, the predecessor bands of the Upper Skagit Tribe built permanent settlements up and down the Skagit River, and built summer camps in the forests and on the mountains near their homes. Roots and plants such as potatoes were cultivated in prairies, and clams were dug across the coast at places like Padilla Bay.

=== Early colonial period ===
The first Europeans to record their encounter with the predecessors of the Upper Skagit were the crew of José María Narváez and the Santa Saturnina around 1791. When they arrived in what they called the "Seno de Padilla" (Padilla Bay), they could see many people who were gathering shellfish, likely from a nearby Nuwhaha village which was located on the bay. Nearby, on Boundary Bay, they had met other peoples who they were surprised to find large amounts of European trade goods and even horses in their possession, with locals even saying that they had seen ships even larger pass by before, implying that there had been previous contact between the Indigenous peoples of the region and Europeans, albeit unrecorded.

Padilla Bay was again visited by Europeans in June 1792, by George Vancouver. Once again they watched the people working in the bay, this time fishing from their canoes. There were several other periodic visits from Europeans into the region, although they never came inland enough to come into contact with the peoples of the Skagit River. Despite this, there were likely Upper Skagit who would have seen the European ships as they travelled outside their territory.

After the establishment of forts Langley and Victoria in modern-day British Columbia, it was common for the Upper Skagit peoples to visit the forts to trade. It became tradition to visit one of the forts (usually Victoria) at least once during one's life.

Sometime before 1855, a man named sƛ̕abəbtikəd (also called Slaybebtikud, Stababutkin, or Captain Campbell) gained a large religious following among the Upper Skagit. sƛ̕abəbtikəd was born at the Snohomish village of hibulb to a Nespelem man, also called sƛ̕abəbtikəd, who had moved west of the Cascade mountains. Although sƛ̕abəbtikəd (the younger) lived on the western side of the mountains, he would often visit his family on the eastern side. There, he became acquainted with a Frenchman named Eugene Casimir Chirouse, who would later become a famous Catholic missionary in the Puget Sound region. When Chirouse arrived in Puget Sound, sƛ̕abəbtikəd offered to translate, knowing both the Okanagan language (which Chirouse had learned) as well as the local language of Lushootseed. After the death of his first wife, he remarried into a highly prestigious Nuwaha family under the famous warrior-leader Petius, which greatly increased his prestige. He became a famous orator and missionary, introducing his own brand of religion to the Upper Skagit, which was a mixture of the Prophet Dance of the plateau, Catholicism, and the local religion. sƛ̕abəbtikəd established himself as the leader of this religion, deviating significantly from the traditionally democratic social order at the time, holding widely attended church sessions during the summer at his large wooden house near what is today Rockport. Eventually, sƛ̕abəbtikəd would establish himself as the sole "chief" of the Upper Skagit, uniting the once-independent peoples of the Skagit River around himself.

In 1855, Isaac Stevens, the first Territorial Governor of Washington, selected representatives from many tribes in the Puget Sound area to sign the Treaty of Point Elliott. Only two Upper Skagit tribes sent representatives: the Nookachamps and the Mesekwigwils. The Nookachamps were represented by Chlahben, and the Mesekwigwils were represented by Sdzekdunum. Other prominent leaders, such as sƛ̕abəbtikəd, attended the treaty convention, but did not sign it. To this day, all members of the Upper Skagit Indian Tribe are descended from or otherwise related to those that signed the treaty.

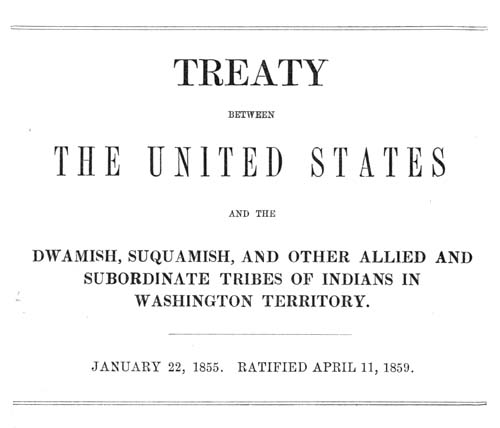
First page of the Point Elliot Treaty

The Upper Skagit continued to live traditionally, hunting and fishing along the banks of the Skagit River and in the surrounding forests. The Upper Skagit also expanded their permanent settlements, clearing areas of land around their homes in order to plant potatoes as well as new crops such as corn, and to raise livestock such as chickens. This way, they could trade for more at the forts.

Due to the lack of pressure from settlers, the various Upper Skagit peoples did not take part in the Puget Sound War of 1855–1856. The first wagon trail along the Skagit River was created by settlers in 1852, coming from the mountains of British Columbia. In 1858, prospectors discovered gold upriver at Ruby Creek. Further White settlement was discouraged by a two-mile logjam at the confluence of the forks of the Skagit River, near its mouth. Settlers had established small towns downriver of the logjam, but it continued to discourage settlement any further upriver for several decades.

In 1870, the first surveyors of the Northern Pacific Railroad entered Upper Skagit territory, which began to encourage settlement. The first White settler to claim land past the logjam was William Hamilton, founding Hamilton. Eventually, a store was built past the logjam at Mount Vernon in 1876. This attracted settlers from the close settlements of Skagit City, Conway, and La Conner. The logjam was destroyed with dynamite in 1878; settlers began to slowly homestead the Skagit River soon after. Furthermore, the settlers trespassed on lands containing graves and burned down a village of eight longhouses at the confluence of the Skagit and Sauk rivers. This new pressure from settlement caused the Upper Skagit to resist further settlement, and increased tensions between the settlers and the Indigenous peoples of the Skagit River.

=== Land disputes ===
In 1886, a White man murdered a Sauk-Suiattle man. The suspect was brought to Lyman for trial by the White authorities, which angered the Upper Skagit (more so than the murder itself), as they had the right to try criminals according to the treaty. Shortly after this event, a surveyor named Henry came to the area. The Upper Skagit, who held surveyors in great disregard, demanded that he leave their lands. After he denied, they destroyed his compass leading him to acquiesce and return downriver. A few days later, the Upper Skagit demanded that all settlers leave the upper Skagit River region, else they would be harmed. The settlers agreed, although some stopped at the homestead of Bernard von Pressentin at Birdsview. A council among the settlers was held, and they asked that five unarmed Indians meet with them. The peoples of the Skagit River selected five people who would meet with the Americans (one of whom was sƛ̕abəbtikəd), and they travelled to the homestead, joined by more than 100 canoes full of people. The five people who were sent to the Americans formally protested at the council, saying that they never signed any treaty with the United States, nor had they received any compensation for land seizure.

No agreement was reached at the council. The five Upper Skagit left the council and camped on the riverbank opposite the homestead with the others who had come. Von Pressentin secretly went downriver to La Conner, where he sent a telegram to the US government asking for aid. The United States sent a company of soldiers from Tacoma, led by M.T. Simmons. Upon seeing the soldiers, the Upper Skagit fled upriver. The soldiers followed, and eventually the two groups met at Concrete. Once again, the Upper Skagit formally protested the seizure of land by settlers. Simmons argued that he could not do anything. Furthermore, he said that if the Upper Skagit continued to resist there would be "reprisals", and that they should make a case to the Department of Justice for assistance; the Upper Skagit delegation agreed. Following this, the five Upper Skagit, led by one Chief Wawitkin, went to Roger S. Green, the territorial judge, to ask for assistance. Green told them to make an appeal to the United States Congress for assistance. It is unknown if an appeal to congress was made. After the council, some Upper Skagit moved from the Skagit River to the Sauk River, where settlement had not occurred.

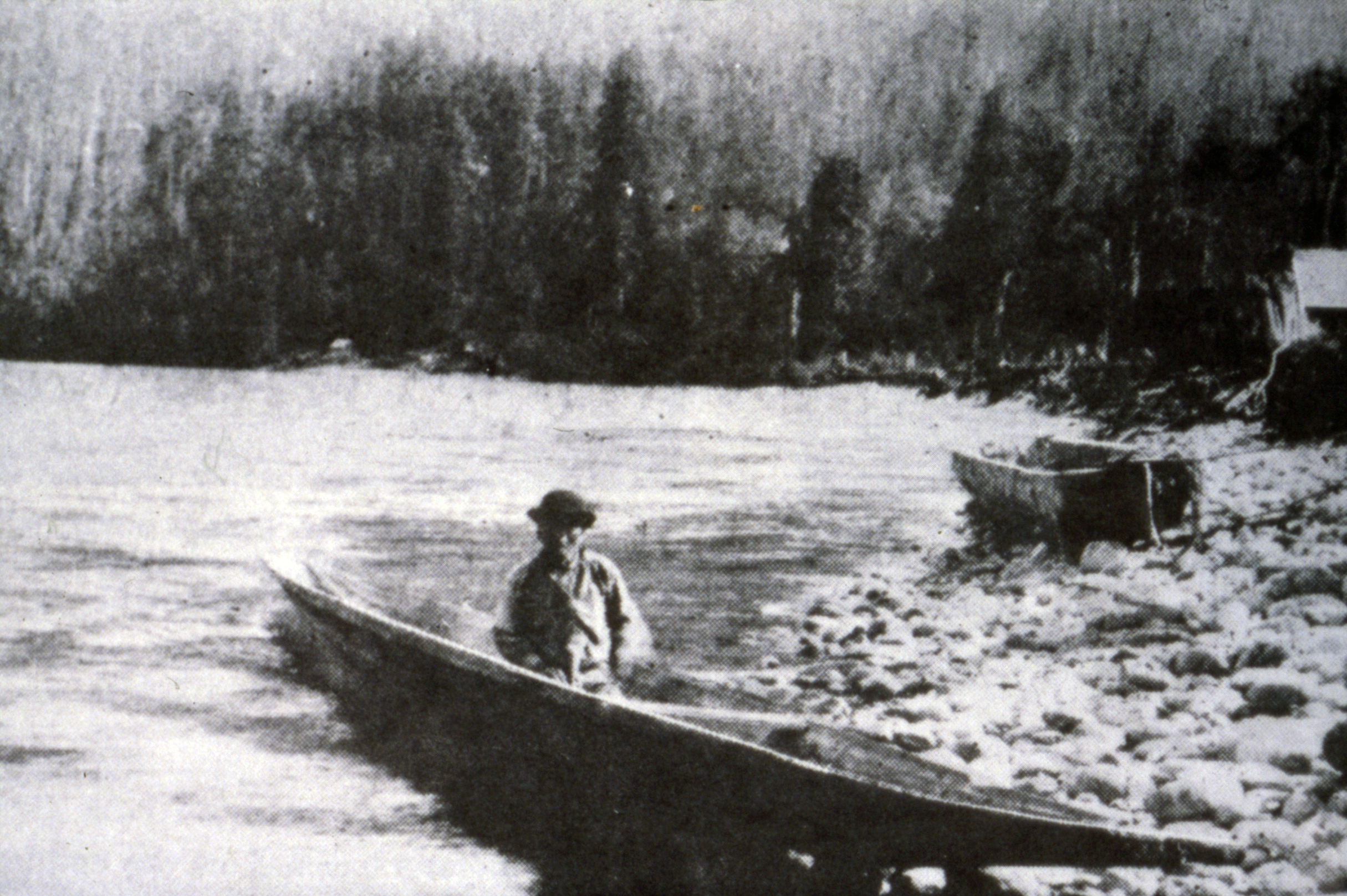
Man in a canoe on the Skagit River, c. 1910

The U.S. Government attempted to make small allotments of land to the Upper Skagit in 1892, but these were rejected by the tribe, who said that they already owned the land and that accepting small allotments would be meaningless. In 1897, the Washington National Forest (known today as the Mount Baker-Snoqualmie National Forest) was established. Forest rangers came and destroyed Upper Skagit fishing weirs. Looking for a new way of making money, many Upper Skagit tried to start their own logging endeavors, floating logs down the river to trade at the mills. Forest rangers came and tried to prevent the Upper Skagit from cutting wood. At this point, many members of the Upper Skagit appealed to the government for allotments of land in the National Forest, all of them being denied. Eventually, in 1907 and 1909, several allotments were granted to the Upper Skagit on the Suiattle River, an extremely isolated area, even into the late 1900s. Some Upper Skagit moved to the area, believing the U.S. government would be creating a reservation for them there. Because of this, the people living on the Sauk River system (which the Suiattle River is a part of) were isolated from mainstream American society. By 1921, zero Upper Skagit children were enrolled in school.

In 1951, the tribe filed a claim, alleging that the payment offered for the 1,769,804 acres (7,162.14 km^{2}) was "unconscionably low". Because the claim overlapped with the claims presented by the Lower Skagit Tribe, they amended their claim seven years later in 1958. This petition, filed on October 17, 1958, also changed the name of the tribe from the Skagit Tribe of Indians to the Upper Skagit Tribe of Indians. On September 23, 1968, the tribe was awarded $385,471.42 for their land.

=== Reservation era ===
The Upper Skagit Indian Tribe was granted federal recognition on December 4, 1974. From 1977 to 1982, the tribe applied for federal grants, which it used to purchase land. The tribe purchased 25 acres over four years on Bow Hill, including from individual tribal citizens who owned land in the area. In 1981, the tribe purchased a 24-acre parcel from a local resident, which they took into trust. A reservation of approximately 100 acres was established on September 10, 1981, with another seven acres being acquired in 1997.

In 1990, the Upper Skagit were joined by the Suquamish Tribe, the Stillaguamish Tribe, and the Sauk-Suiattle Tribe in signing a pact with the Washington State Department of Fish and Wildlife to adopt "comprehensive internal hunting regulations", by which the tribes would "set seasons, report kills, and issue hunting and identification requirements, much to the displeasure of non-Indian sportsmen".

== Government ==
Historically, the society of the Upper Skagit peoples was based on extensive kinship ties. The highest level of permanent authority was never above the family unit, and as such, "chiefs" (as they are described in the literature) were non-existent at the time of colonization. During the colonial period, Upper Skagit society began to shift towards centralization, and certain figures began to appear whose influence and authority reached outside of their family and across society. Several figures emerged during this period, including sƛ̕abəbtikəd. sƛ̕abəbtikəd himself was followed by his son, John Campbell. John Campbell's sister, Lahabulitsa, succeeded him. When she died, she was succeeded by John Campbell's son, Joseph Campbell. When Joseph Campbell died, his eldest son, John Campbell became chief. By 1974, the Chief of the Upper Skagit was Peter Campbell, his eldest brother and the second son of Joseph Campbell.

Today, the Upper Skagit Indian Tribe is governed by the Upper Skagit Tribal Council, a seven-member elected body which carries out the governmental responsibilities of the tribe. The chairman of the tribe is elected through a popular vote from all members of the tribe.

== Upper Skagit Indian Reservation ==
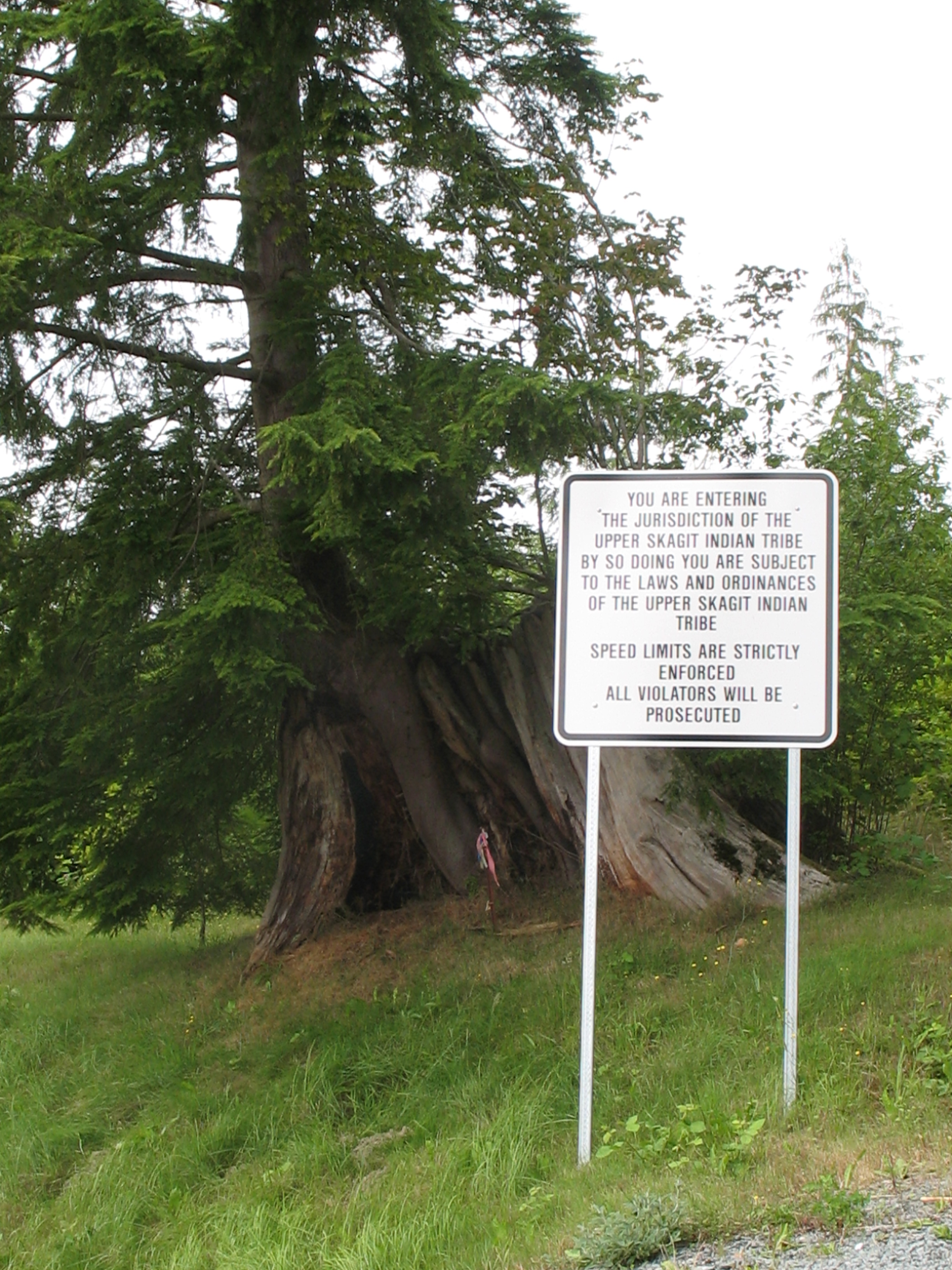
Sign at reservation entrance

The Upper Skagit Indian Reservation was established on September 10, 1981. It consists of three separate small parcels of land in western Skagit County. The largest section, located northeast of Sedro Woolley, is at 48°32′31″N 122°11′15″W, while the smaller western sections are at 48°33′33″N 122°20′42″W, and at 48°34′07″N 122°20′43″W, about midway between Seattle and Vancouver, BC on Interstate Highway 5. The total land area is approximately 107 acres (0.404686 km^{2}). Its resident population was 238 persons as of the 2000 census. As of the 2020 census, the population was 266 persons.

== Demographics ==
Around 1855, there were about 300 people who lived along the Skagit River. In 1984, there were 233 members of the Upper Skagit Indian Tribe. In 1994, the tribe had 600 members, and by 2008, the tribe had 1,031 citizens.

Most tribal members live in Skagit County and are employed in surrounding communities. In 2004, the tribe was awarded a grant of $1,369,611 to build affordable housing on the reservation.

== Economy and services ==
For most of history, prior to the formation of the Upper Skagit Indian Tribe, the precursor groups were hunter-gatherers who relied on hunting, fishing, and gathering for subsistence. This has carried on to today, and members of the tribe utilize their treaty rights to participate in traditional hunting, fishing, and gathering throughout the Skagit Valley. From 1792 to the mid-20th century, the economy gradually shifted from one based on hunting and gathering, to one based on agriculture and wage labor. Furthermore, as the economy shifted towards wage labor, economic independence dropped, as people began to rely more on food, tools, weapons, and jobs which were introduced and supplied by settlers.

Early after contact, trade with settlers became a large factor in the Indigenous economy. Trading posts in forts allowed people to buy trade goods, as well as new foods, which could be planted. Logging in the region started around 1865. Settlers opened logging camps that employed both Indians and Whites, and as more settlers came to the region, they further utilized the Native population for their labor, both in the forests, the home (as domestic laborers), and in their farms. In the 20th century, logging became the main industry in which Upper Skagit citizens were employed. By 1974, most Upper Skagit continued to be employed in the logging industry. Some Upper Skagit were employed as letter carriers, using their canoes to travel swiftly up and down the Skagit River.

The Upper Skagit Indian Tribe operates the Skagit Valley Casino Resort, which is located off Interstate 5 near Burlington. The casino opened in 1995 and is 65,000 square feet (6,000 m^{2}). It employs 450 people and attracts 1 million visitors annually. The Upper Skagit Tribe also has managed the Resort Semiahmoo, which is located near Blaine, since 2003.

The Tribe provides health services to its citizens from its Upper Skagit Tribal Health Facility, a 4,500 square feet (420 m^{2}) facility that provides primary care and other social services.

The Upper Skagit Tribe is one of the three member nations (alongside the Swinomish Indian Tribal Community and the Sauk-Suiattle Indian Tribe) of the Skagit System Cooperative, an inter-tribal organization that regulates and enhances fishing along the Skagit River. The tribe operates a hatchery on the Skagit River, which facilitated the return of coho salmon to the reservation in 2008 for the first time in 50 years. In 2009, the Upper Skagit tribe received a $105,000 grant to restore 140 acres of salmon habitat near the reservation.

Over 500 people are employed by the Upper Skagit Tribe on the reservation, both in government and business positions.

== Culture ==
The tribe holds the annual Upper Skagit Celebration and Stick Game Tournament each year in August, which is held in Sedro-Wooley.

=== Religion ===
The Upper Skagit were introduced to Christianity by sƛ̕abəbtikəd, and many initially converted to Roman Catholicism. By the 20th century, another Christian religion had gained prominence, that being the Indian Shaker Church. The Indian Shaker Church originated in Mud Bay, Washington, and is a syncretic religion which combines elements of both Christian beliefs and Indigenous beliefs, to various degrees in various churches. In the mid-1900s, other Upper Skagit still followed the traditional Indigenous religion.

Since 1947, various Evangelical Protestant churches, such as the Pentecostal Church, began encouraging Upper Skagits to become members. Although most members of the congregation were white by the 1970s, there were a growing number of Upper Skagit members of the congregation.

=== Language ===
The Upper Skagit peoples speak Northern Lushootseed, a Central Coast Salish language spoken by a variety of Indigenous peoples across Puget Sound. The dialect spoken by the Upper Skagit is called Skagit (Lushootseed: sqaǰətucid), which consists of three mutually-intelligible sub-dialects: Lower Skagit, Upper Skagit, and Sauk.

Use of Lushootseed has declined since the beginning of the colonial period, and the last fluent native speaker of Lushootseed, Vi Hilbert, an Upper Skagit citizen, died in 2008. Today, the language is primarily spoken in ceremonial contexts. Despite this, there are efforts across Puget Sound to revitalize the language. Vi Hilbert dedicated much of her life to recording and revitalizing the language.

== Notable Upper Skagit Indians ==
- Vi Hilbert (1918–2008), culture bearer and fluent Lushootseed language speaker

== See also ==
- Lower Skagit – Native American tribe
