= Guemes Island =

Small island in the Salish Sea, northwest Washington, United States

Coordinates: 48°32′52″N 122°37′28″W

Qweng7qwengila7 Nickname: Dog Island
- Location of Guemes Island in the Salish Sea

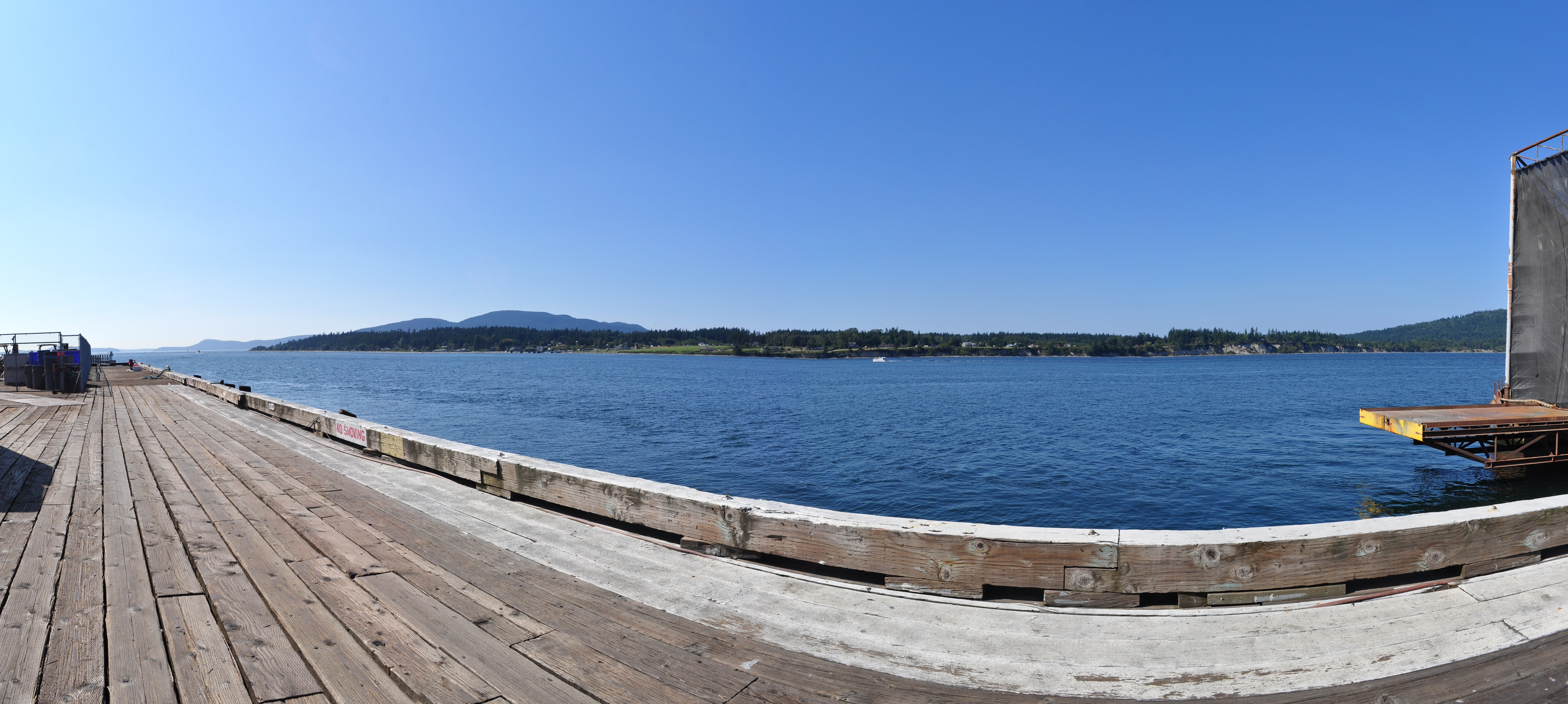
- Guemes Island from Anacortes
- Etymology: Juan Vicente de Güemes, 2nd Count of Revillagigedo

Geography
- Location: Salish Sea

Guemes Island (Samish: Qweng7qwengila7) is a small island in western Skagit County, Washington, United States. It is located north of Fidalgo Island and the city of Anacortes, and is accessible by private boat and by the Guemes Island ferry operated by Skagit County.

Guemes Island was named by the Spanish after the Viceroy of New Spain, Juan Vicente de Güemes, who commissioned an expedition that revealed the islands to Spain in 1794.

== Island life ==
Guemes Island has a rural character with limited facilities.

Some of the island’s beaches are public but most beaches' access is private. There are also two parks: one in the middle of the island known as Schoolhouse Park, and another, Young's Park, located on North Beach near The Guemes Island Resort.

The community located on Guemes Island is generally referred to as "Guemes".

== History ==
Guemes Island is within the traditional territory of the Samish Indian Nation. The aboriginal Samish people had a village at Sxwalímet, near the present ferry terminal, which existed until around 1850. The Samish language name for the island is Qweng7qwengila7, which means "many dogs", referring to Salish Wool Dogs.

Guemes Island was named by the Spanish explorer José María Narváez as Isla de Güemes during the 1791 expedition of Francisco de Eliza, in honor of the Viceroy of Mexico, Juan Vicente de Güemes Padilla Horcasitas y Aguayo, 2nd Count of Revillagigedo.

Around 1873, the Samish people, displaced by the U.S. government, established a new village on Guemes near Potlatch Beach.

In 1841 Charles Wilkes of the United States Exploring Expedition gave the name "Lawrence Island" to Guemes Island, to honor the American naval officer James Lawrence. He also gave the name "Hornet Harbor" to Guemes Channel, for the USS Hornet, which Lawrence commanded during the War of 1812. To the waterway north of the island, part of Bellingham Bay, Wilkes gave the name "Penguin Harbor", for the British vessel Penguin, captured by Lawrence. These names disappeared after 1847, when the British Captain Henry Kellett reorganized the British Admiralty charts, in the process removing the "pro-American" names given by Wilkes and affirming pro-British names and Spanish names.

The Samish, whose village occupied the only natural spring on the island, were forced off the island in 1912.

Guemes Island was also commonly known locally as Dog Island in the early 20th century, from the large number of Salish Wool Dogs living wild on the island.

== Demographics ==
The following Census statistics represent a block group that also contains the neighboring islands of Cypress Island, Sinclair Island, and Vendovi Island. As of the census of 2000, there were 605 people, 292 households, and 180 families residing in the block group. There were 626 housing units. The racial makeup of the block group was 95.70% White, 1.16% African American, 0.83% Native American, 0.00% Asian, 0.00% Pacific Islander, 0.99% from other races, and 1.32% from two or more races. 1.32% of the population were Hispanic or Latino of any race.

There were 292 households, out of which 22.9% had children under the age of 18 living with them, 57.2% were married couples living together, 3.4% had a female householder with no husband present, and 29.0% were non-families. 30.8% of all households were made up of individuals, and 39.4% had someone living alone who was 65 years of age or older. The average household size was 1.95 and the average family size was 2.38.

In the block group, the population was spread out, with 16.0% under the age of 18, 2.6% from 18 to 24, 11.6% from 25 to 44, 41.3% from 45 to 64, and 27.9% who were 65 years of age or older. The median age was 53 years. For every 100 females, there were 119.2 males. For every 100 females age 18 and over, there were 104.8 males.

The median income for a household in the block group was $40,039, and the median income for a family was unavailable. Income by sex was also unavailable, as was per capita income. 8.1% of the population was below the poverty line. Family poverty statistics were unavailable. Out of the total population, 36.1% of those under the age of 18 and 0.0% of those 65 and older were living below the poverty line.

== Magnetic disturbance ==
Nautical and aeronautical charts note a magnetic disturbance off the southeastern tip of Guemes Island. The disturbance affects compasses enough to cause as much as 2° discrepancy from average local variation.
