= Guemes Island ferry =

Ferry route in Skagit County, Washington, U.S.

Guemes Island Ferry
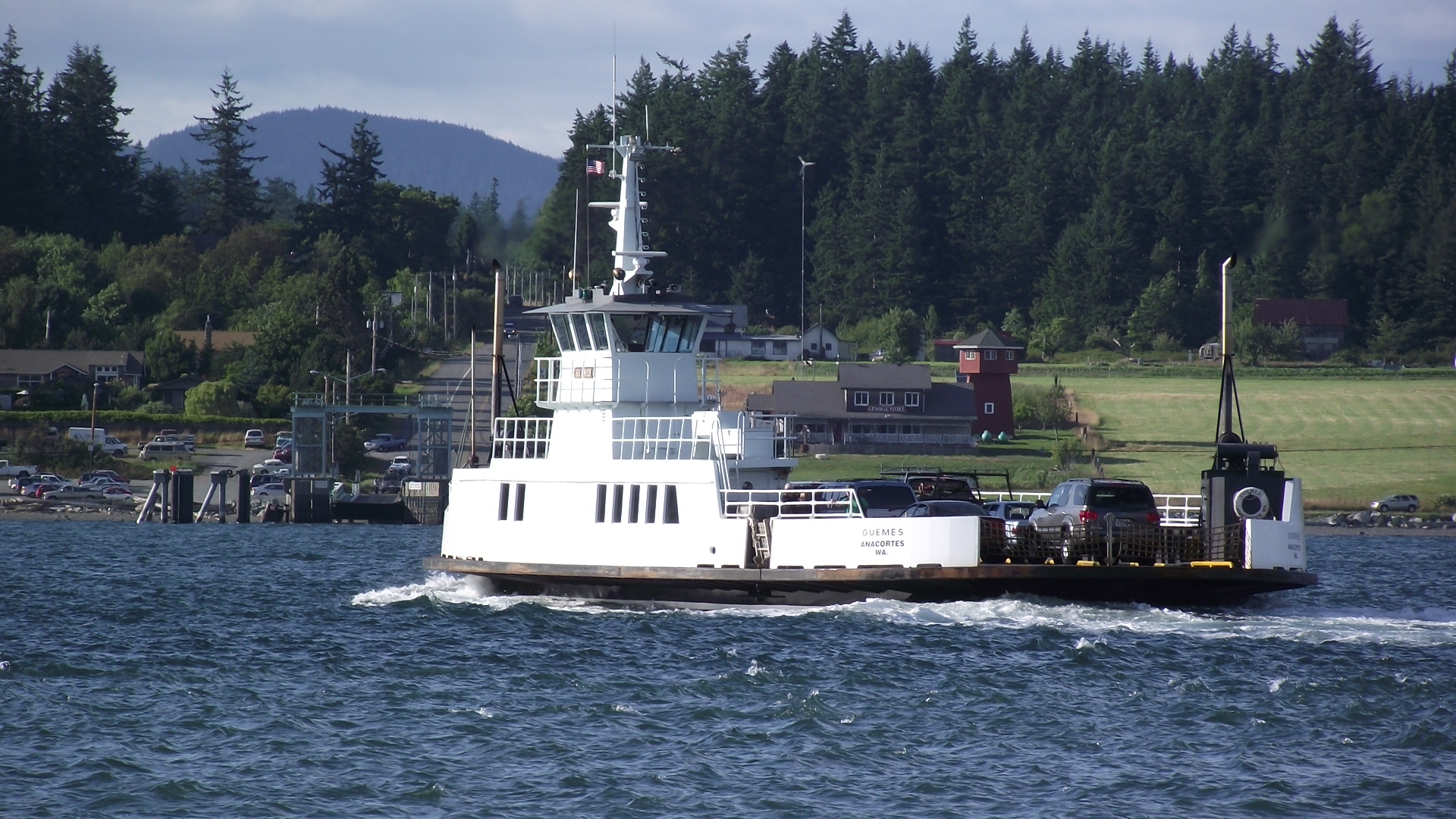
- The Guemes Island ferry crosses Guemes Channel en route to its namesake island. (2011)
- Route: Anacortes, WA – Guemes Island
- Authority: Skagit County
- Began operation: Ferry service on this route dates to 1890; current ferry went into service in 1979
- Travel time: 5 minutes
- No. of vessels: one
- Yearly ridership: 400,000
- Yearly vehicles: 200,000

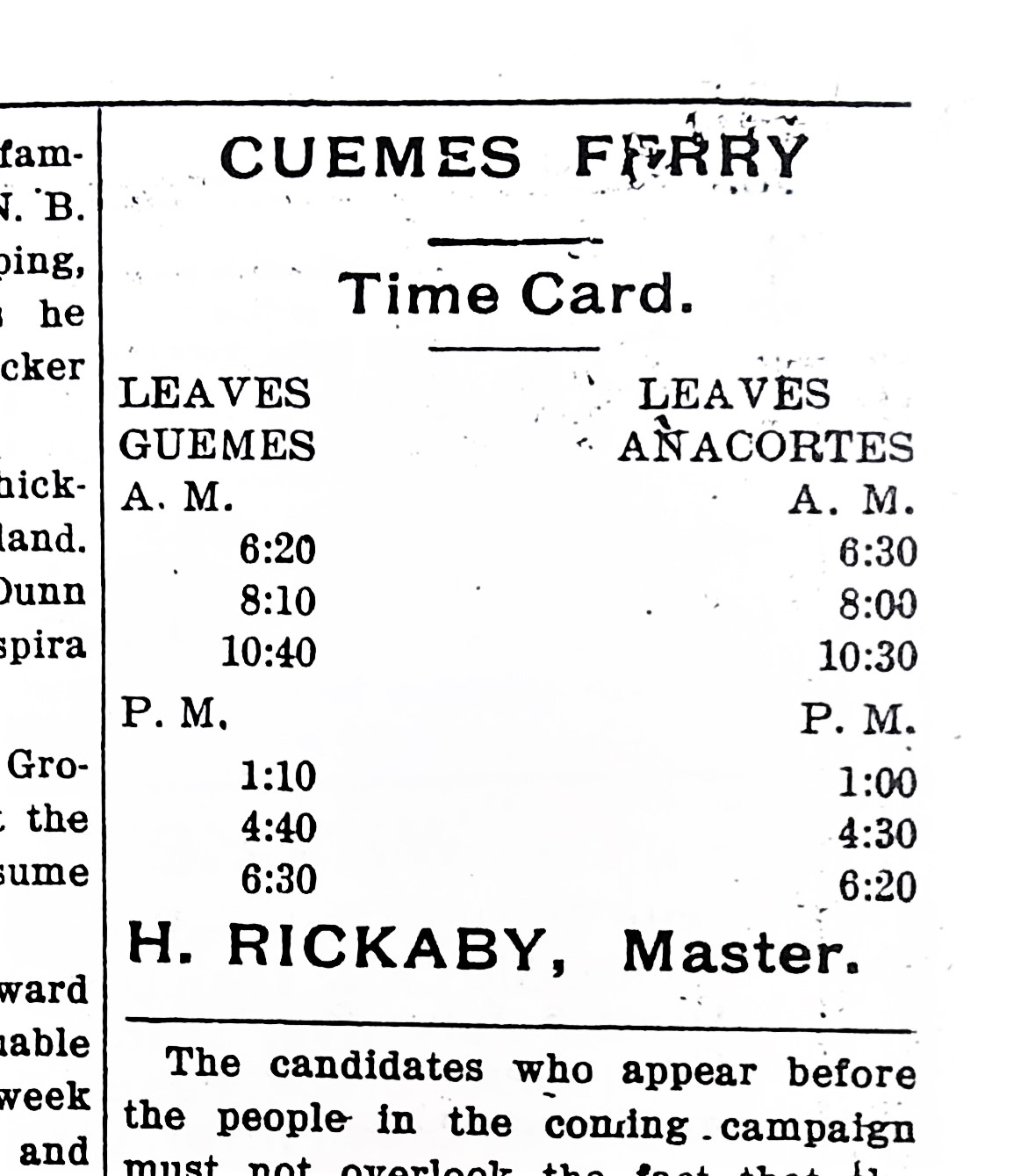
Guemes Island ferry schedule, published in 1912 in the Guemes Tillikum newspaper

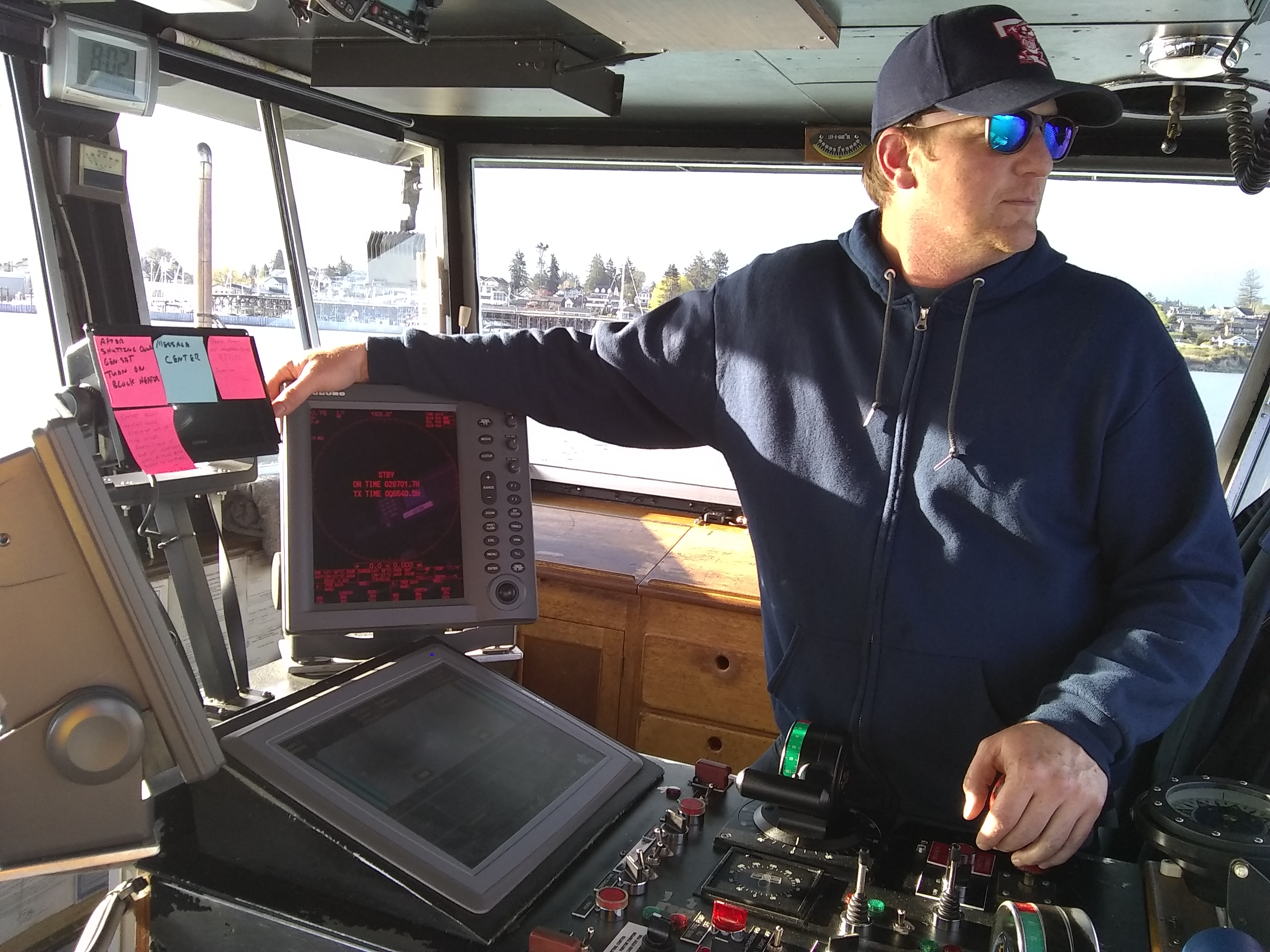
Guy Mitchell, a captain aboard the Guemes Island ferry, checks vessel traffic during a crossing April 11, 2020. Mitchell is one of seven crew members, including the ferry manager, to possess a 100-ton master's license.

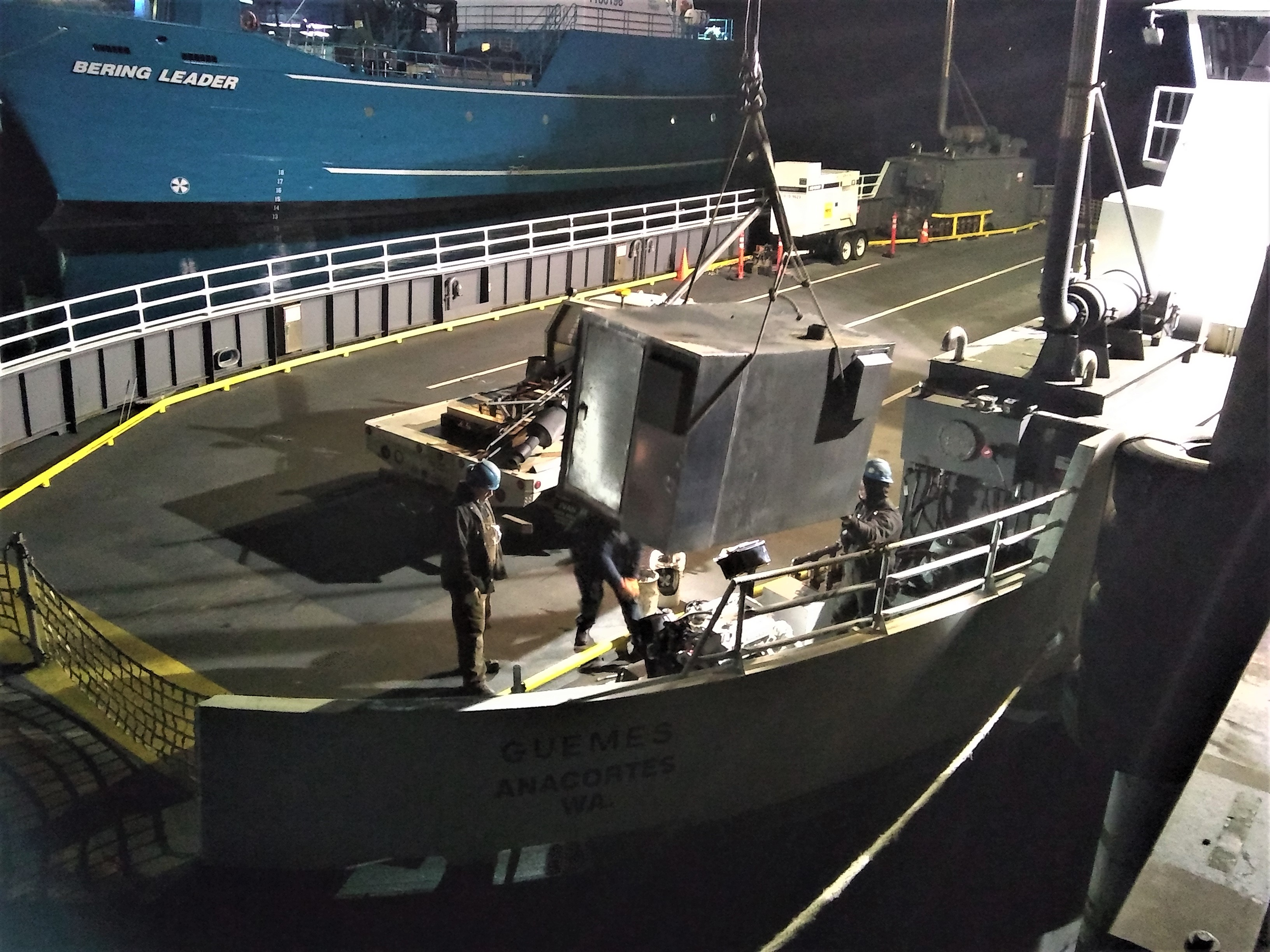
The M/V Guemes' generator was replaced in March 2020 at Dakota Creek Shipyards in Anacortes. Work was performed at night over a period of several days so service was not interrupted.

The Guemes Island ferry, the M/V Guemes, carries passengers and vehicles across Guemes Channel between Anacortes, Washington and Guemes Island. The ferry is operated by the Skagit County Public Works Department's Ferry Division.

== History ==
The original mariners in these waters were the Coast Salish, who traveled in fine, hand-carved cedar canoes. Guemes Island is within the historical territory of the Samish Indian Nation. A Samish village, sxwalímet, existed on the site of what is now the Guemes Island Ferry Terminal until the 1840s.

Scheduled ferry service between Anacortes and Guemes Island dates to 1890. According to a published timeline produced by the Anacortes Museum:

- 1890-1902: W.C. Pyle establishes the first private ferry service between Anacortes and Guemes Island: the steamer Lola, Capt. M.B. Miller. A launch, the Glide, also provides service. The U.S. Mail Steamer Buckeye, Capt. A. Newhall, includes Guemes Island on its Friday Harbor-Anacortes-Whatcom route.
- 1902-1912: The Sunny Jim, Capt. Harry Rickaby, is in service.
- 1912-1915: The 40-foot, 35-passenger Elk, Capt. Harry Rickaby, is in service.
- 1915-1917: The 60-passenger Elk II, Capt. Harry Rickaby, is in service.
- 1917-1959: The Guemes, 86 tons and 48.6 feet in length, is in service. Capt. Bill Bessner takes over operation of the Guemes in 1920.
- 1959-1979: The Almar is in service. Almar was built in 1947 on Puget Island in the Columbia River, where it served until moving to the Anacortes-Guemes ferry route. Almar, with a capacity for nine vehicles, was not a true double-ender; the ferry had to be backed into the Anacortes slip, and large trucks could not be carried. Almar is reported to still be afloat in Alaska.
- 1979–present: The current Guemes is in service.

Notable captains on the Anacortes-Guemes Island route include Harry Rickaby, 1902–1920; Bill Bessner, 1920–1948; Sandy Bernsen, 1950–1963; Al Bacetich, 1963–1988; Ray Separovich, 1965–1986; Tony Bacetich, 1988–1991; Pat Hoyland-Smith, 1988–2005; Gary Casperson, 1992–2006. Capt. Jane E. Favors, whose credential endorsements include unlimited oceans master, later served as captain of the USACE Yaquina.

== Anacortes-Guemes ferry route ==
Guemes Island is accessible only by water, and the Skagit County-operated ferry is a vital transportation link between Anacortes (Fidalgo Island) and Guemes Island. The ferry carries commuters, visitors, construction and logging trucks, essential-services trucks, and emergency vehicles and personnel to and from the island.

In addition to its regularly scheduled runs, the ferry stands ready 24/7 to transport emergency responders to and from the island in response to 911 calls.

The ferry is briefly taken out of service once every two years for overhaul and maintenance in a shipyard. During that time, passenger-only service is provided by the Strait Arrow, under contract with Skagit County Public Works' Ferry Division. When serving the Anacortes-Guemes ferry route, the Strait Arrow is piloted by a captain provided by the vessel's owner, Arrow Launch Service; and two crew members from the M/V Guemes. Residents needing to get a vehicle to or from the island can contract with M/V San Juan Enterprise, which is owned by San Juan Marine Freight.

A renovation of the terminals at Anacortes and Guemes was completed in May 2011. Also in May 2011, the Washington State Department of Transportation completed a new terminal building at Anacortes, with funding through the American Recovery and Reinvestment Act.

The first floor of the Anacortes terminal building houses a ferry passenger waiting area, restrooms, purser's office, and maintenance workshop. The second floor houses offices, restroom, crew room and kitchen. There is also a parking lot and outdoor waiting area.

On Guemes Island, there is a waiting room, parking lot and portable restroom.

== Ferry and crew ==
The current ferry, M/V Guemes, (91 tons) is a 21-vehicle, 100-passenger, diesel-powered ferry designed by Nickum & Spaulding of Seattle and built by Gladding-Hearn Shipbuilding in Somerset, Massachusetts. She was launched on Dec. 21, 1978 and put into service on the Anacortes-Guemes route in 1979.

The ferry operates daily and transports roughly 200,000 vehicles and 400,000 passengers annually. Its certificate of inspection sets the capacity at 100 passengers and three crew members. In July 2025, there were 20 crew on the roster — four captains (one full-time, three regular part-time), one engineer, and 15 deckhands.

The ferry will eventually be replaced by a newly built electric ferry using funds from the Climate Commitment Act's Cap-and-Invest program.

A 2026 report by the technical advisory group recommended that the ferry be replaced with a plug-in hybrid ferry, as opposed to an all-electric ferry. This could potentially jeopardize funding from the CCA.
