= Sammamish (disambiguation) =

Sammamish is a city in the State of Washington, United States.

Sammamish may also refer to:

- Sammamish people, a Coast Salish Native American tribe
- Lake Sammamish
- Lake Sammamish State Park
- Sammamish River
- Sammamish High School, in Bellevue, Washington

== See also ==
- Samish (disambiguation)
