= Marco Hatch =

Native American marine biologist and professor

Marco Hatch is an Samish and American marine biologist and professor known for integrating traditional ecological knowledge with contemporary marine science. He teaches at the College of the Environment at Western Washington University. Hatch's work focuses on sustainable marine practices, enhancing collaboration between scientists and Indigenous communities, and promoting diversity and inclusion within the scientific community.

== Early life and education ==
Marco Hatch, a citizen of the Samish Indian Nation, was raised in Yakima, Washington. He initially enrolled at Western Washington University after high school but left within his first year. He later attended Whatcom Community College, where he completed a Bachelor's degree while working in food service and catering. During this period, the Samish Indian Nation launched the Samish Stewards Program, directed by Russel Barsh, which provided members with coastal research internships and educational stipends. Following participation in this program, Hatch pursued further studies at the University of Washington's School of Aquatic and Fishery Sciences. He later earned a doctorate in Biological Oceanography from the Scripps Institution of Oceanography in San Diego.

== Career ==
Upon leaving graduate school, Hatch applied for and received a fellowship that placed him at Northwest Indian College. He was then hired as director of the Salish Sea Research Center at the same college. As of 2024, Hatch works as a professor at Western Washington University. In addition to his professional work, Hatch also resides on the advisory committee for the United Nations Ocean Decade Collaborative Center for the Northeast Pacific and is part of the Clam Garden Network where he works to continue and promote indigenous style clam garden management techniques.

Hatch was selected by the Pew Charitable Trusts as one of the seven global 2023 Pew Fellowship in Marine Conservation recipients, which provides recipients with $150,000 over the span of three years to use on a project that involves marine conservation.

Hatch's work primarily focuses around how traditionally trained scientists can better support aquatic communities such as clam gardens. Additionally, Hatch is discovering and implementing ways that scientists and indigenous communities can combine their knowledge into new ecological practices. Clam gardens have long been utilized by indigenous peoples to sustainably harvest clams without damaging local populations or the ecosystem. Hatch states that the indigenous methods are two to four times more productive than conventional practices that are commonly used today.

== Inclusion work ==
Hatch integrates traditional ecological knowledge with contemporary marine science, with a focus on Indigenous perspectives in environmental management. He has worked with Indigenous communities in the Pacific Northwest on projects related to the restoration and management of marine ecosystems, including clam gardens and eelgrass meadows. One study, titled 'Indigenous sea gardens within the Pacific Northwest generate partial trophic niche and dietary fatty acid shifts in littleneck clams (Leukoma staminea),' reflects his contributions to community-based restoration research.

In addition to his academic research, Hatch participates in initiatives aimed at improving diversity and inclusion in the scientific field. He has contributed to educational programs, workshops, and conferences designed to increase representation of Indigenous and other underrepresented groups in environmental science. At Western Washington University, he has developed courses that incorporate Indigenous knowledge systems into the curriculum.
