= Bay View, Washington =

- CDP
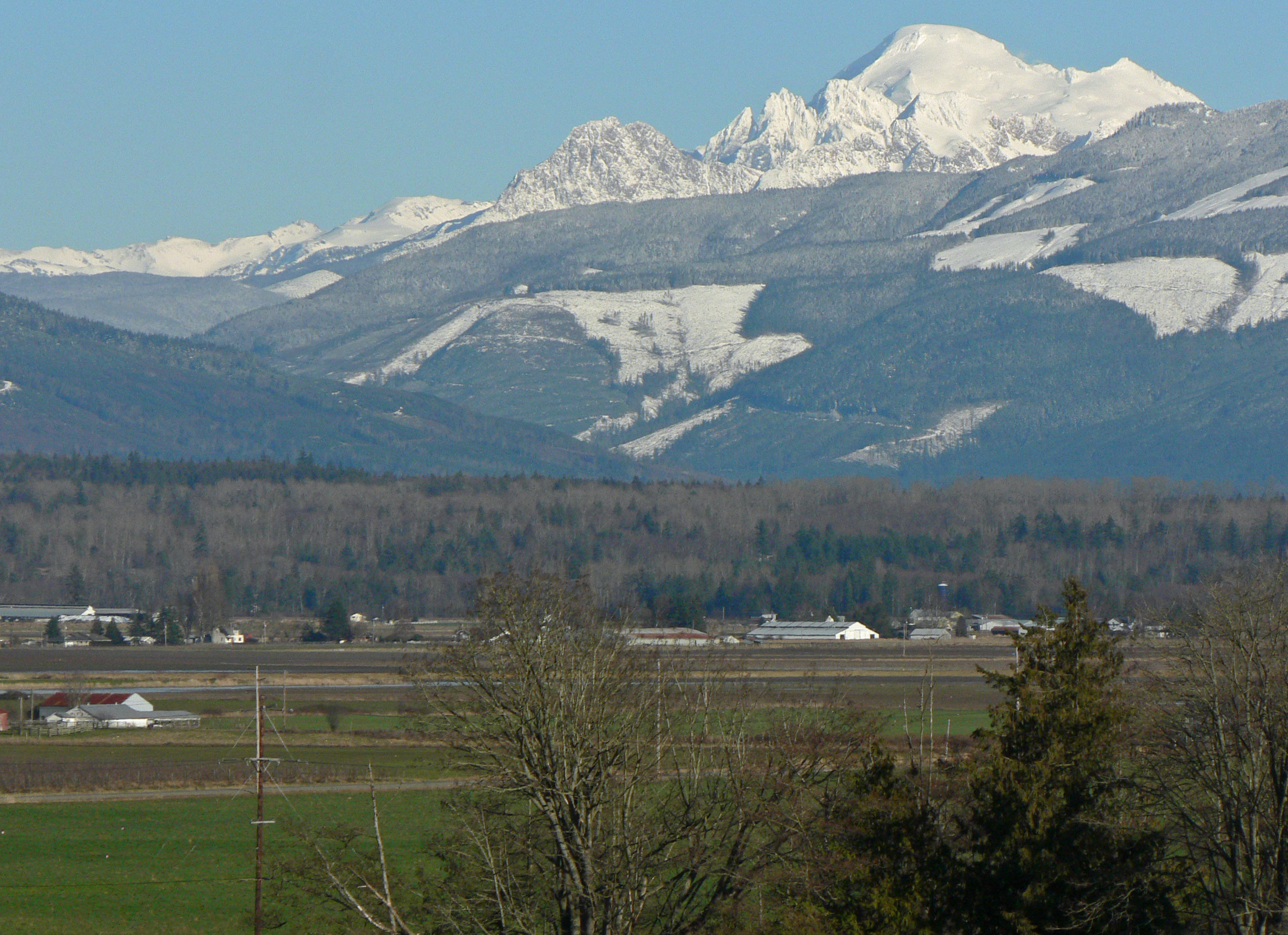

- Location of Bay View, Washington
- Coordinates: 48°29′42″N 122°28′02″W
- Country: United States
- State: Washington
- County: Skagit

Area
  - Total: 1.7 sq mi (4.3 km^{2})
  - Land: 1.7 sq mi (4.3 km^{2})
  - Water: 0 sq mi (0.0 km^{2})
- Elevation: 161 ft (49 m)

Population (2020)
  - Total: 812
  - Density: 490/sq mi (190/km^{2})
- Time zone: UTC-8 (Pacific (PST))
  - Summer (DST): UTC-7 (PDT)
- ZIP Code: 98273
- Area code(s): 360, 564
- FIPS code: 53-04790
- GNIS feature ID: 2407809

Bay View is a census-designated place (CDP) in Skagit County, Washington, United States. The population was 812 at the 2020 census. It is included in the Mount Vernon–Anacortes, Washington Metropolitan Statistical Area.

== History ==
Bay View was named and plotted in 1884 by William J. McKenna.

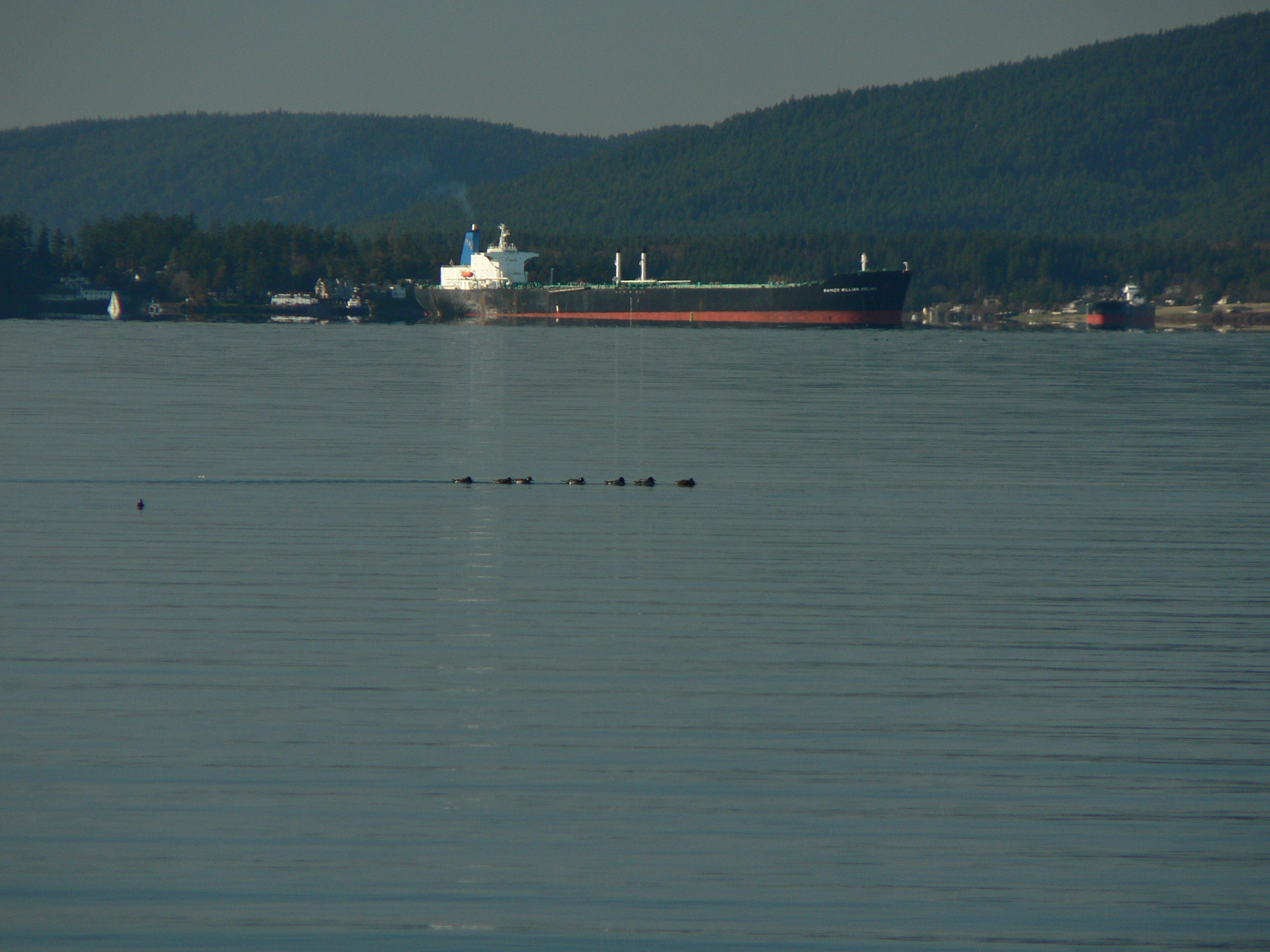
Double-hulled oil tankers dock at March Point across Padilla Bay from Bay View.

== Geography ==
According to the United States Census Bureau, the CDP has a total area of 1.6 square miles (4.3 km^{2}), all of it land.

== Demographics ==
Historical population
Census	Pop.	Note	%±
2000	334		—
2010	696		108.4%
2020	812		16.7%
U.S. Decennial Census; 1970 1980 1990; 2000 2010

Bay View first appeared as a census designated place in the 2000 U.S. census.

=== Racial and ethnic composition ===
Bay View CDP, Washington – Racial and ethnic composition Note: the US Census treats Hispanic/Latino as an ethnic category. This table excludes Latinos from the racial categories and assigns them to a separate category. Hispanics/Latinos may be of any race.
Race / Ethnicity (NH = Non-Hispanic)	Pop 2000	Pop 2010	Pop 2020	% 2000	% 2010	% 2020
White alone (NH)	315	661	724	94.31%	94.97%	89.16%
Black or African American alone (NH)	0	1	0	0.00%	0.14%	0.00%
Native American or Alaska Native alone (NH)	3	7	2	0.90%	1.01%	0.25%
Asian alone (NH)	1	4	1	0.30%	0.57%	0.12%
Native Hawaiian or Pacific Islander alone (NH)	0	0	0	0.00%	0.00%	0.00%
Other race alone (NH)	0	2	2	0.00%	0.29%	0.25%
Mixed race or Multiracial (NH)	7	3	58	2.10%	0.43%	7.14%
Hispanic or Latino (any race)	8	18	25	2.40%	2.59%	3.08%
Total	334	696	812	100.00%	100.00%	100.00%

=== 2000 census ===
As of the census of 2000, there were 334 people, 161 households, and 95 families residing in the CDP. The population density was 203.0 people per square mile (78.2/km^{2}). There were 168 housing units at an average density of 102.1/sq mi (39.3/km^{2}). The racial makeup of the CDP was 96.41% White, 0.90% Native American, 0.30% Asian, 0.30% from other races, and 2.10% from two or more races. Hispanic or Latino of any race were 2.40% of the population.

There were 161 households, out of which 18.6% had children under the age of 18 living with them, 54.7% were married couples living together, 3.1% had a female householder with no husband present, and 40.4% were non-families. 34.2% of all households were made up of individuals, and 11.8% had someone living alone who was 65 years of age or older. The average household size was 2.07 and the average family size was 2.65.

In the CDP, the age distribution of the population shows 17.4% under the age of 18, 4.2% from 18 to 24, 19.8% from 25 to 44, 36.8% from 45 to 64, and 21.9% who were 65 years of age or older. The median age was 48 years. For every 100 females, there were 83.5 males. For every 100 females age 18 and over, there were 80.4 males.

The median income for a household in the CDP was $27,250, and the median income for a family was $28,214. Males had a median income of $31,917 versus $0 for females. The per capita income for the CDP was $14,782. None of the families and 5.2% of the population were living below the poverty line, including no under eighteens and 8.1% of those over 64.

== Education ==
The community is served by the Burlington-Edison School District.
