= Samish River =

Samish River sqʷəɬqʷalič
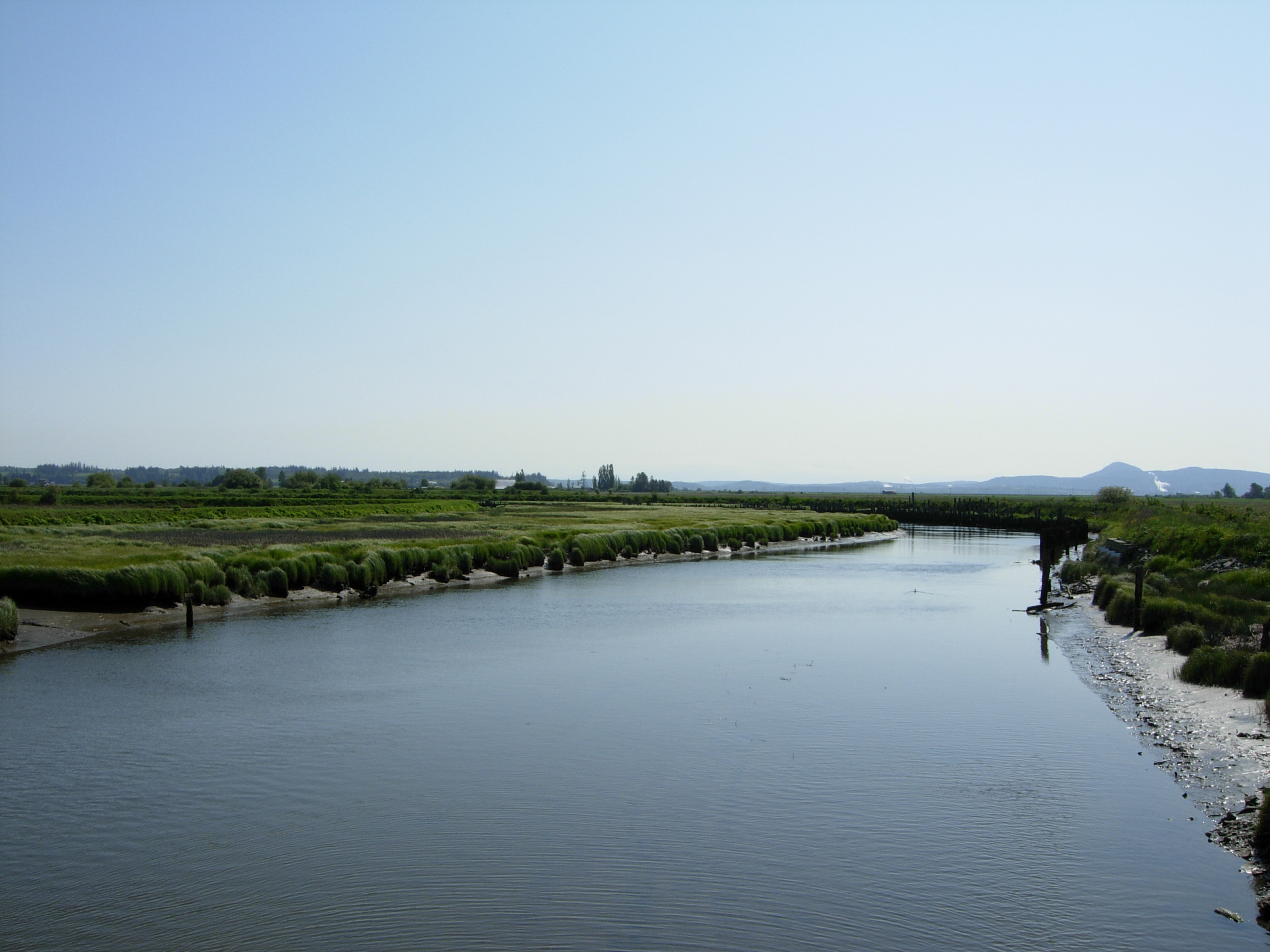
- Samish River near Edison, Washington.

- Location of the mouth of the Samish River in Washington Samish River (the United States)

Location
- Country: United States
- State: Washington
- City: Edison, Washington

Physical characteristics
- Source
  - location: Washington, United States
- Mouth: Samish Bay
  - location: Washington, United States
  - coordinates: 48°33′27″N 122°27′59″W
- Length: 25 mi (40 km)
- Basin size: 139 sq mi (360 km^{2})
- Discharge
  - location: USGS gage 12201500 near Burlington, WA
  - average: 245 cu ft/s (6.9 m^{3}/s)
  - minimum: 15 cu ft/s (0.42 m^{3}/s)
  - maximum: 5,020 cu ft/s (142 m^{3}/s)

Basin features
- Tributaries
  - left: Friday Creek

The Samish River (Lushootseed: sqʷəɬqʷalič) is approximately 25 miles (40 km) long, in northwestern Washington in the United States. The river drains an area of 139 square miles (360 km^{2}) between the Skagit River basin on the south and the Nooksack River basin on the north. The Samish River originates on a low divide in Whatcom County, and its tributary, Friday Creek, originates in the hills south of Bellingham. The river continues its southwesterly flow through Skagit County and outlets into Samish Bay in Puget Sound.

The Samish River supports a large variety of fish and is home to one of Washington's larger fall King Salmon runs. The Samish River has runs of five Salmon and three trout species including: Spring/Winter Steelhead, Summer Sockeye, Fall Chinook/Chum/Coho, and year-round runs of Cutthroat, and Dolly Varden. Also documented are Pink Salmon which, while rare, do arrive in small numbers to spawn in the Samish.

There are two fish hatcheries supporting the Samish River. One located in the upper Samish directly below the mouth of Friday Creek, and another several miles up Friday Creek. Both hatcheries raise Fall Chinook and can process over 10,000,000 salmon smolt a year, 5-20,000 of those returning 1–5 years later to spawn as adults.

The river is named after the Samish people. The Nuwhaha, today part of the Samish and the Upper Skagit, had several villages along the river. The name in their language, Lushootseed, is sqʷəɬqʷalič.

== See also ==
- List of rivers of Washington (state)
- Samish people
