= Sinclair Island (Washington) =

Small island in the Salish Sea, northwest Washington, United States

Coordinates: 48°37′15″N 122°40′34″W

Sinclair Island is an island in the U.S. state of Washington. It is a part of, and lies off the western shore of mainland Skagit County. The island has a land area of 4.109 km^{2} (1.586 sq mi) and is home to only a few private residents.

The name Sinclair was given by Charles Wilkes during the Wilkes Expedition of 1838–1842. It honors Arthur Sinclair, who was captain of General Pike during a naval battle of the War of 1812.

Settlers in the 1890s referred to the island as Cottonwood Island, after the lumber harvested there for making barrel heads and staves.
