= Samish people =

Samish
Xws7ámesh

Total population
- 1,440 (2010)

Regions with significant populations
- United States (Washington)

Languages
- English, Samish

Religion
- Christianity, Indigenous

Related ethnic groups
- other Coast Salish peoples

The Samish (Samish: Xws7ámesh) are a Native American people who live in the U.S. state of Washington. They are a Central Coast Salish people. Through the years, they were assigned to reservations dominated by other Tribes, for instance, the Swinomish Indians of the Swinomish Reservation of Washington and the Tulalip Tribes of the Tulalip Reservation. They are also enrolled in the Samish Indian Nation, formerly known as the Samish Indian Tribe, which regained federal recognition in 1996.

== Name ==
The name "Samish" is an anglicization of the Samish name Xws7ámesh, meaning "people who are there/who exist." The name "properly" referred to people from Samish Island, but extended broadly to all the Samish villages.

== History ==
=== Pre-Contact with Europeans ===
The Samish fished in the islands and channels off the coast of Skagit County, Washington. The Samish had villages on Samish, Guemes, and Fidalgo Islands, and fished and harvested resources there and in the San Juan Islands. In 1847, Samish had more than 2,000 members. Epidemics of measles, smallpox, and ague, and attacks from Haida and Tsimshian from the north diminished the population to approximately 150 members in one village by 1855, at the time of the signing of the Point Elliott Treaty. After the Treaty, some Samish moved to the Swinomish or Lummi reservations.

=== Post-Contact with Europeans ===
Though 113 Samish were present at the treaty negotiations and signing, no Samish signed the Point Elliott Treaty. The Samish were attached to the treaty by the signature of the Lummi chief Chow-its-hoot. Lacking a reservation of their own, many Samish were sent to live on the reservations of the Lummi or the Swinomish.

However, many Samish refused to go to the reservations and stayed in their traditional territory. They were often confused with the Skagit, and when they went to the Swinomish Reservation, they received only six household land allotments for the entire Tribe.

Many members went to Guemes Island to establish New Guemes (now referred to as "Potlatch Beach"), where they built a longhouse that housed more than 100 people. By 1912, the Samish had either moved onto the Swinomish Reservation or into other communities. They had been pushed off the island by white settlers, as the Samish had occupied the land with the only fresh water.

In 1926, a formal constitution was written by the Samish. They later altered it, but included a plan for electoral government. In 1971, in settlement of their land claim against the federal government, the Tribe was awarded US$5,754.96 for lands taken by the Point Elliott Treaty. The judgment deemed that they had exclusively occupied 9,233 acres (37 km^{2}) of land at the time of the treaty.

In 1996, the Samish were officially re-recognized by the U.S. government. In 1998, they changed their official name to the Samish Indian Nation.

== Geography ==
The historic core of Samish territory was in the southeastern San Juan Islands and nearby mainland around Samish and Padilla bays. They exclusively used Samish, Guemes, Cypress, Blakely, and Decatur islands, neighboring smaller islets south of Lummi Island, the northwestern half of Fidalgo Island, and the eastern portion of Lopez Island. Additionally, they used locations on the mainland as far north as Chuckanut Bay, particularly along the streams around Samish Bay, which they shared with the neighboring Nuwhaha people.

Within their territory, the Samish had a number of permanent villages.

- Sxwálimet: South side of Guemes Island, at the site of the present ferry terminal. The residents of this village were called [sχʷɛˈχʷɑːimɛt]. (Note: International Phonetic Alphabet representation, as recorded by Suttles (1974).) In 1792, this village had two large longhouses. A Samish person whose father and uncle came from the village remembered that there had been houses all along the shoreline at one point. Around 1850, the village was abandoned and the residents moved to Samish Island.
- Q’elech’ílhch: North side of Fidalgo Island, opposite the channel from Sxwálimet. It was formed as an overflow after the village at Sxwálimet became too crowded. The name Q’elech’ílhch means 'ironwood'.
- Qwlhó7el: East side of March Point on Fidalgo Island. It was abandoned sometime early in the 19th century, though it continued to be used as a summer camping spot and an area for gathering camas and, after the 1830s, cultivating potatoes. The name means "camas".
- A7ts'íqen: East end of Samish Island. Around 1850, this village received an influx of people from Sxwálimet. After this move, the village consisted of one longhouse, several hundred feet long. In 1873, a white settler had established a store on the island and forced the inhabitants to leave; they relocated to Guemes Island.
- Qweng7qwengila7: This village was established on the western side of Guemes Island in 1873 after people were forced to leave A7ts'íqen. It was homesteaded by Samish leaders Citizen Sam and Billy Edwards, who claimed two lots and built a 400-foot longhouse. It was co-operatively owned by nine men who built it and was occupied by members of the Samish, Nuwhaha, and Klallam. Members of the village began building European-style houses on these lots as well until 1912 when they were forced off the island by their neighbors. The remaining Samish moved to the Swinomish Reservation.

The Samish also occupied a number of sites in the summer during the seasonal round before returning to their homes in the colder months.

== Culture ==
=== Language ===
The Samish language is a dialect of the Northern Straits Salish (Lkungen) language; a close sister language is Southern Straits Salish (Clallam or Klallam. Both are in the Central Coast Salish branch of Coast Salish, itself a branch of the large Salish(an) language family (Tim Montler 1999: "Language and dialect variation in Straits Salishan". Anthropological Linguistics 41 (4): 462–502, Kuipers, Aert H. Salish Etymological Dictionary. Missoula, MT: Linguistics Laboratory, University of Montana, 2002. ISBN 1-879763-16-8) Coast Salish.

In 1990, the Canadian Museum of Civilization published A Phonology, Morphology, and Classified Word List for the Samish Dialect of Straits Salish, by Brent D. Galloway (Canadian Ethnology Service, Mercury Series Paper #116). This is the first grammatical sketch and extensive word list for the Samish dialect; it was based on linguistic field work by Galloway with the last-known remaining speakers. Galloway's recorded tapes are on file with the Museum of Civilization and the Samish Nation. Three or four fluent or partially fluent speakers remain as of 2013.

=== Subsistence ===
Traditionally, the Samish gathered camas (qwlhól) in the spring, notably on the small islets surrounding Lopez Island. Clams were dug in the early summer on the south shore of Lopez Island among other locations. They hunted seals with the Swinomish around Smith Island.

Spring salmon (yómech) was trolled for in the channel between Lopez and San Juan islands. Halibut (só7tx̲) was caught in the early summer off Lopez, Blakely, and Cypress islands. In midsummer, sockeye salmon (séqey’) were caught in reefnets along Lopez Island. Late runs of silver salmon (qéchqs) and dog salmon (kw’ólexw) were caught in the streams on the mainland in the fall.
