= Samish Bay =

Bay in Washington, United States

Coordinates: 48°36′20.4″N 122°31′00.6″W

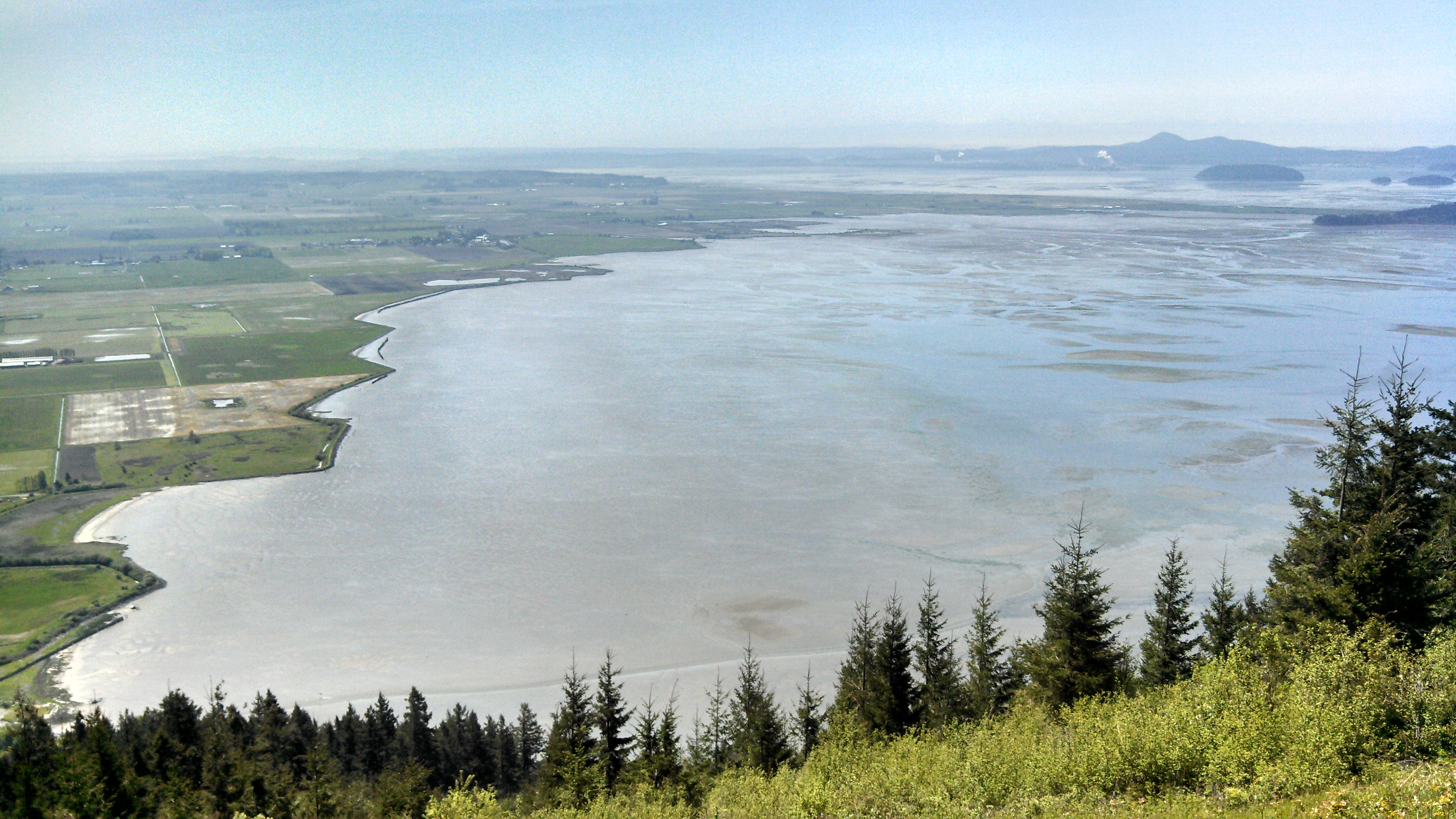
- Samish Bay from the north
- Location: Skagit County, Washington, United States
- Part of: Salish Sea
- River sources: Samish River
- Interactive map of Samish Bay

Samish Bay is a bay of the Salish Sea in Skagit County, Washington, United States. It is adjacent to Bellingham Bay and Chuckanut Bay in the north. To the northeast the bay is bordered by Larrabee State Park and the Chuckanut Mountains. To the south the bay is bordered by Samish Island, which despite its name is not an island, but actually a man-made peninsula, separating the bay from nearby Padilla Bay.

The Samish River is the only river that empties into the bay, although a few small creeks do drain into the bay from within Larrabee State Park. Samish Bay is named after the Samish people, a Coast Salish people of the Pacific Northwest.

== Restoration ==
Agriculture along the Samish River and near Samish Bay contributed to various forms of water pollution. Bacteria (specifically fecal coliform) that has runoff from farmland has negatively impacted shellfish populations in the bay, as well as waterfowl habitat. The polluted shellfish have been deemed unsafe for human consumption, causing a recall of previously harvested shellfish, and put a stop to further harvesting. Skagit County has established an initiative to clean Samish Bay, setting up a hotline for water quality concerns, as well as working with federal, state, Indian tribes, non-governmental organizations, shellfish growers, and private citizens to reduce pollution in the bay. In 2004, the Washington Department of Fish and Wildlife purchased 107-acres of agricultural land next to Samish Bay and established a wildlife area. As of 2010 the U.S. Environmental Protection Agency has awarded more than $90 million to go towards cleaning the bay. As of 2023 Amazon has put forward $200,000 in funding towards introducing oysters back into the bay.

== Panorama ==
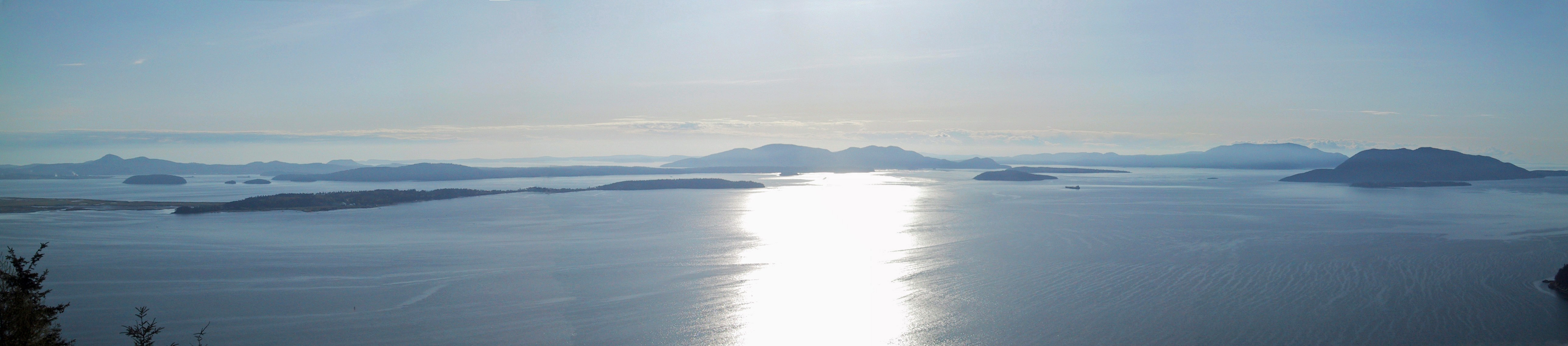
Panorama from Blanchard Mountain in April 2010. Samish Island seen on left, Lummi Island to the right, and Cypress Island in the middle.

== See also ==
- Bellingham Bay
- Larrabee State Park
- Samish Island
- Salish Sea
