= Padilla Bay =

Bay in northwest Washington, United States

Coordinates: 48°30′57.5″N 122°32′0.1″W

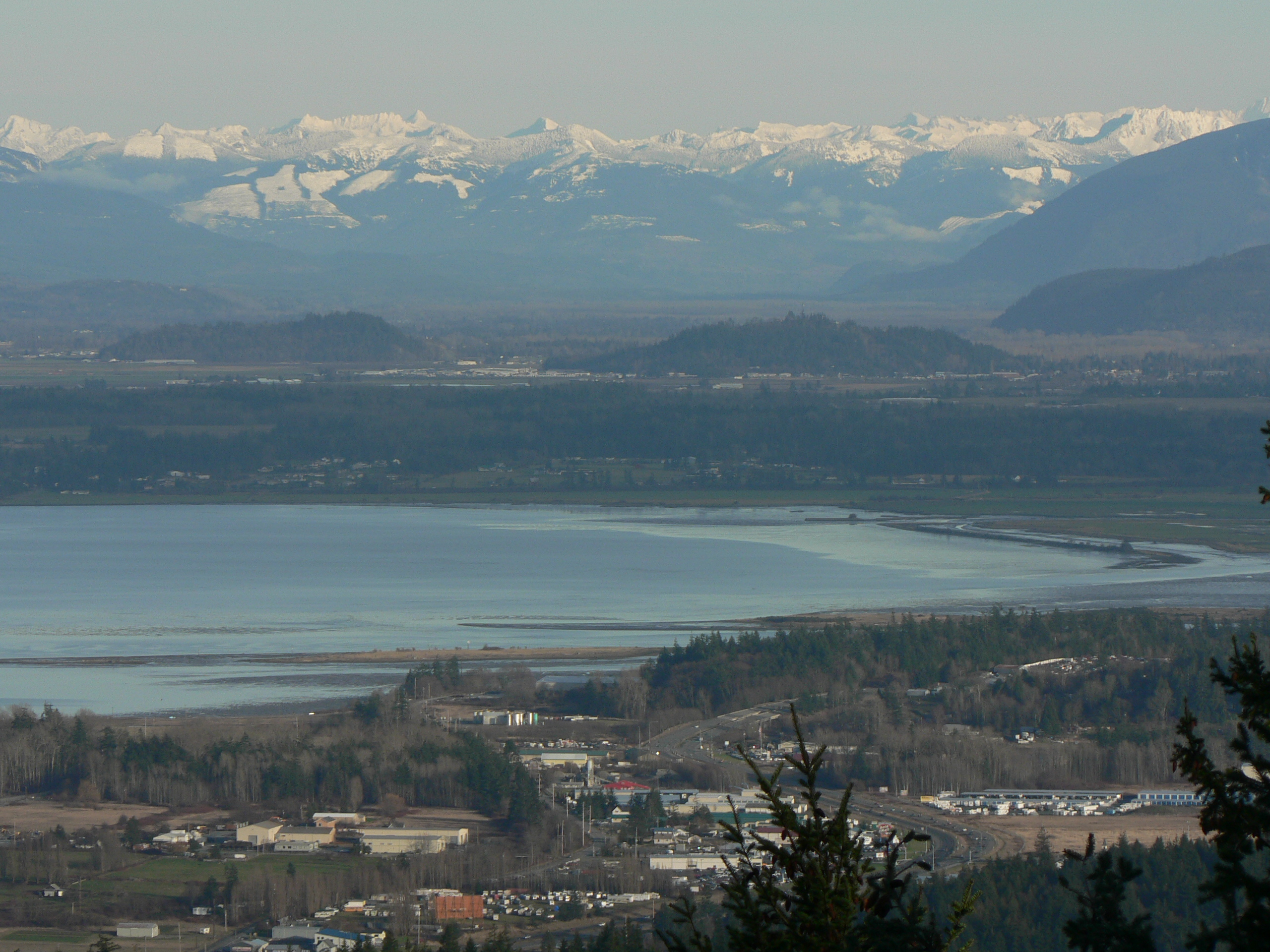
- The south portion of Padilla Bay with March Point (foreground) and the Skagit River Valley in the distance

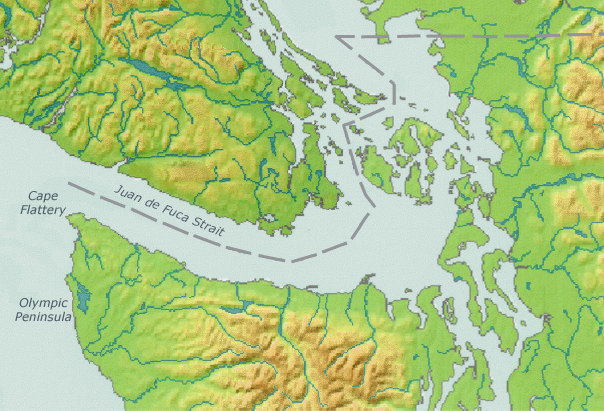
- Location within Strait of Juan de Fuca Location within Washington (state) Location within the United States
- Location: Washington, United States
- Type: Bay
- Part of: Salish Sea

Padilla Bay is a bay located in the U.S. state of Washington, between the San Juan Islands and the mainland. Fidalgo Island and Guemes Island lie to the west of Padilla Bay. Guemes Channel, between the islands, connects Padilla Bay to Rosario Strait. Samish Island lies to the north of Padilla Bay, beyond which is Samish Bay and Bellingham Bay.

== History ==
In 1791 the Spaniard José María Narváez explored and named Padilla Bay, calling it Seno Padillo, in honor of Juan Vicente de Güemes Padilla Horcasitas, the viceroy of New Spain.

== The Estuary ==
Padilla Bay is a tidal bay. It is entirely flooded at high tide and at low tide mudflats are exposed. These mud flats are habitat for many species of birds and animals. The bay is very shallow. Near Hat Island the bay is only 12 feet (4 m) deep. Part of the estuary tidal flats are contained by dikes built in order to make farmland out of the mudflats. The Swinomish Channel is a salt-water channel in Washington State, United States, which connects Skagit Bay, to the south, and Padilla Bay, to the north, separating Fidalgo Island from mainland Skagit County. In the past, the Skagit River had emptied into Padilla Bay.

== The Reserve ==
The Padilla Bay National Estuarine Research Reserve is an area of about 8,000 acres (32 km^{2}) of estuary (more than 11,000 acres (45 km^{2}) total, including upland habitat) located in Skagit County. The reserve contains the Breazeale Interpretive Center, which features exhibits about the natural history and ecology of the estuary and bay, fish tanks, a hands-on room and a video theater.

The site also features classrooms, research facilities, and public access to a beach site. It is a popular location for graduate studies from Western Washington University and the University of Washington.

Padilla Bay is a part of the National Estuarine Research Reserve which it was incorporated into in 1980. It is managed by the Washington Department of Ecology. It has several trails. There is a wheelchair trail to the observation deck as well as a shore trail that is 2.25 miles (3.62 km) long and runs along the top of the dikes.
