= Samish Island, Washington =

Unincorporated community in Washington, US

Coordinates: 48°34′33″N 122°32′28″W

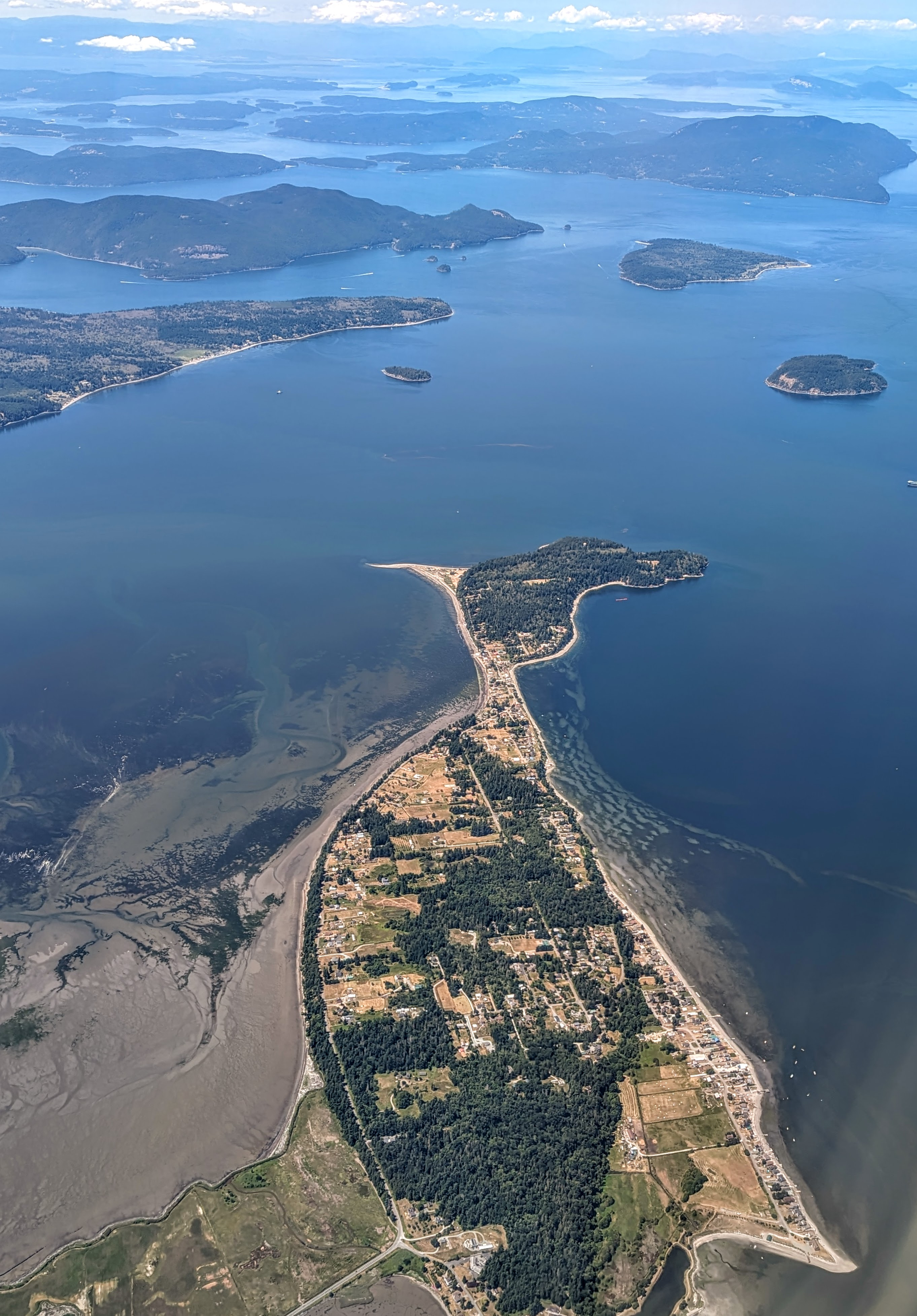
Aerial view of Samish Island, with Samish Island Road at lower left connecting to the mainland

Samish Island was an unincorporated community in Skagit County, Washington, United States. It was on an island with the same name, which is located off the northwest coast of the Washington mainland. It is connected to the mainland by land reclaimed through a system of dikes created in the early 20th century.

Samish Island is named after the Samish people, a Coast Salish people of the Pacific Northwest. Both the Samish and the Nuwhaha peoples historically used the island. The western end of the island is named Xwtl’échqs in the Samish language and sƛ̕əpqs in the Lushootseed language, both meaning "deepwater point" in the respective languages. The eastern end is named A7ts’íqen in Samish and qʷəqʷaliqs in Lushootseed. The narrow isthmus connecting the two areas is named bəsbəsič, meaning "thin cords."

In the late 19th century, the US Navy began to construct a series of dykes and drainage ditches to create a connection to the mainland. In the 1930s, the connection was finished.

== Community microgrid ==
In 2023, Puget Sound Energy (PSE) installed a community microgrid at the Samish Island Fire Station consisting of a 50 kW / 332 kWh battery energy storage system and an 8 kW solar array. The project was developed as a demonstration project to evaluate battery storage, grid resiliency, and backup power capabilities for the fire station and three nearby residences during electrical outages."Battery Storage Projects". Puget Sound Energy.

Following installation of the microgrid, neighboring property owners alleged that noise generated by the facility exceeded Skagit County noise limits. The dispute resulted in a county code enforcement case, multiple noise complaints, and regional media coverage. According to KING 5 News, PSE and county officials acknowledged that the facility exceeded applicable noise limits and required mitigation measures."Puget Sound Energy's Samish Island microgrid causes problems for nearby residents". KING 5 News.

The dispute was also featured on Brandi Kruse's [un]Divided, which interviewed the neighboring property owners about the facility's noise and PSE's efforts to mitigate it. During the report, Kruse quoted Skagit County's response to the mitigation process: "We feel it's reasonable to allow PSE to explore less expensive options for compliance."Kruse, Brandi (March 24, 2026). "Citizens revolt against Battery Energy Storage Systems". YouTube.
