= Samish dialect =

Dialect of North Straits Salish

Samish
- Xws7ámeshqen
- Pronunciation: [xʷsʔ'e.məʃ.qen]
- Native to: United States, Canada
- Ethnicity: Samish people
- Revival
- Language family: Salishan: Coast Salish; Central Coast Salish; Straits Salish; North Straits Salish; Samish
- Writing system: NAPA (Xws7ámeshqen Alphabet)

Language codes
- ISO 639-3: –
- Glottolog: sami1249

Samish (Xws7ámeshqen, IPA: [xʷsʔ'e.məʃ.qen]) is a dialect of the North Straits Salish dialect continuum spoken by the Indigenous Samish people of the Pacific Northwest. Samish is traditionally referred to as a language, but it is mutually intelligible with the other dialects of North Straits Salish. Samish is a Coast Salish language and is closely related to other languages in that family.

The Samish language is still spoken by some Samish tribal members, and the Samish Indian Nation's Xws7ámeshqen Program is working to revitalize the language in daily life. They offer classes to tribal citizens and have an online website with a wordlist and placenames.

== Phonology ==
Consonants
		Bilabial	Dental	Alveolar			Palatal	Velar		Postvelar		Glottal
		Bilabial	Dental	median	sibilant	lateral	Palatal	plain	lab.	plain	lab.	Glottal
Plosive/ Affricate	plain	p		t	(t͡s)		t͡ʃ	(k)	kʷ	q	qʷ	ʔ
Plosive/ Affricate	ejective	pʼ	t͡θʼ	tʼ		t͡ɬʼ	t͡ʃʼ		kʷʼ	qʼ	qʷʼ	ʔ
Fricative					s	ɬ	ʃ		xʷ	χ	χʷ	h
Sonorant	plain	m		n		l	j		w	ŋ		
Sonorant	glottalized	mˀ		nˀ		lˀ	jˀ		wˀ	ŋˀ		

- /t͡s/ is a rare sound, only occurring in the deictic morpheme ⟨cə⟩.
- /t͡θʼ/ may commonly be heard as [t͡sʼ] in free variation among speakers.
- /k/ is only found in loanwords.

Vowels
	Front	Central	Back
Close	i		u
Mid	e	ə	
Open		a	

== Orthography ==
Xws7ámeshqen Alphabet
Uppercase	Lowercase	IPA
7		/ʔ/
A	a	/e/
Ch	ch	/t͡ʃ/
Ch'	ch'	/t͡ʃ‘/
E	e	/e~ə/
H	h	/h/
I	i	/i/
K	k	/k~k’/
Kw	kw	/kʷ/
Kw'	kw'	/kʷ’/
L	l	/l/
Lh	lh	/ɬ/
M	m	/m/
N	n	/n/
Ng	ng	/ŋ/
O	o	/ɔ/
P	p	/p/
P'	p'	/p’/
Q	q	/q/
Q'	q'	/q’/
Qw	qw	/qʷ/
Qw'	qw'	/qʷʼ/
S	s	/s/
Sh	sh	/ʃ/
T	t	/t/
T'	t'	/t’/
Tl'	tl'	/t͡ɬ’/
Ts	ts	/ts/
Ts'	ts'	/ts’/
U	u	/u/
W	w	/w/
X̲	x̲	/χ/
Xw	xw	/xʷ/
X̲w	x̲w	/χʷ/
Y	y	/j/
