= Bellingham Bay =

Bay of the Salish Sea, northwest Washington, United States

Coordinates: 48°43′12″N 122°33′37″W

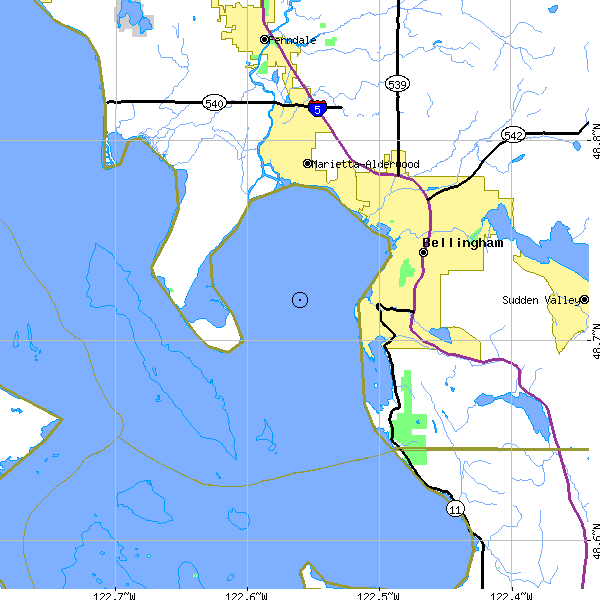
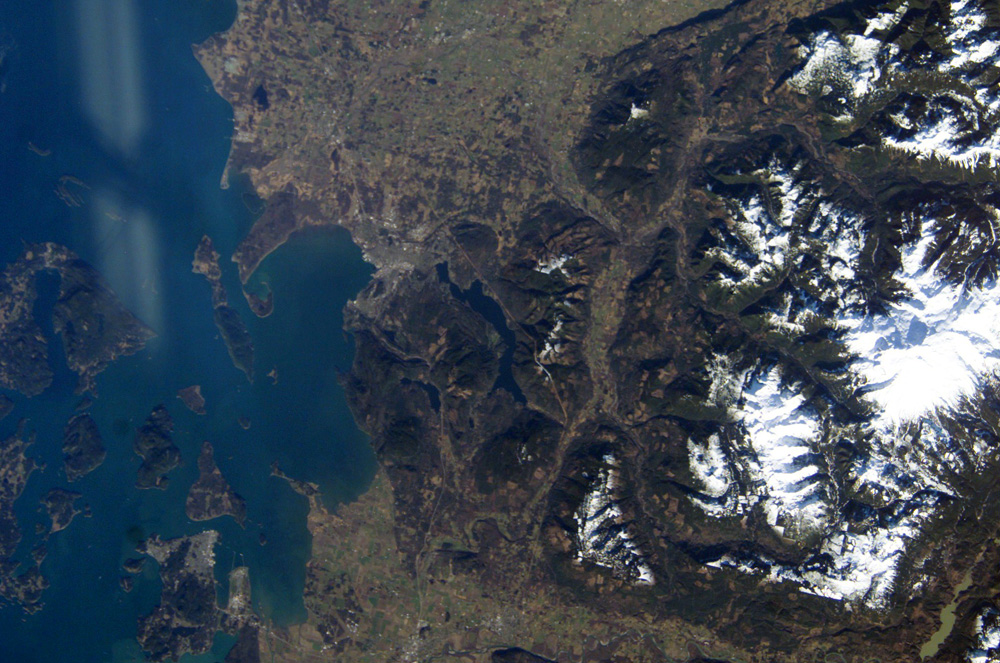
- Satellite image of Bellingham Bay

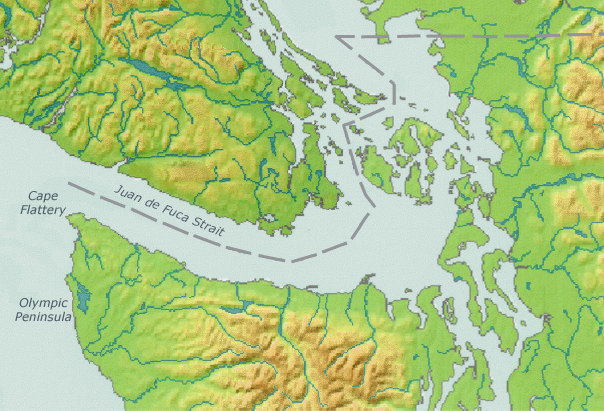
- Location within Strait of Juan de Fuca Location within Washington (state) Location within North America
- Location: Washington, United States
- Type: Bay
- Part of: Salish Sea
- Settlements: Bellingham, Washington

Bellingham Bay is a bay of the Salish Sea located in Washington State in the United States. It is separated from the Strait of Georgia on the west by the Lummi Peninsula, Portage Island, and Lummi Island. It is bordered on the east by Bellingham, Washington, to the south-east by the Chuckanut Mountains, and to the south by Samish Bay. The Nooksack River empties into the bay, as does Whatcom Creek.

Bellingham Bay is named for Sir William Bellingham, who was controller of the storekeeper's account for the Royal Navy at the time that the Vancouver Expedition visited the bay in June 1792. The first European entry of the bay was by the Spanish schooner Santa Saturnina under José María Narváez, during the 1791 expedition of Francisco de Eliza. Narváez named it Seno Gaston.

== Economy ==
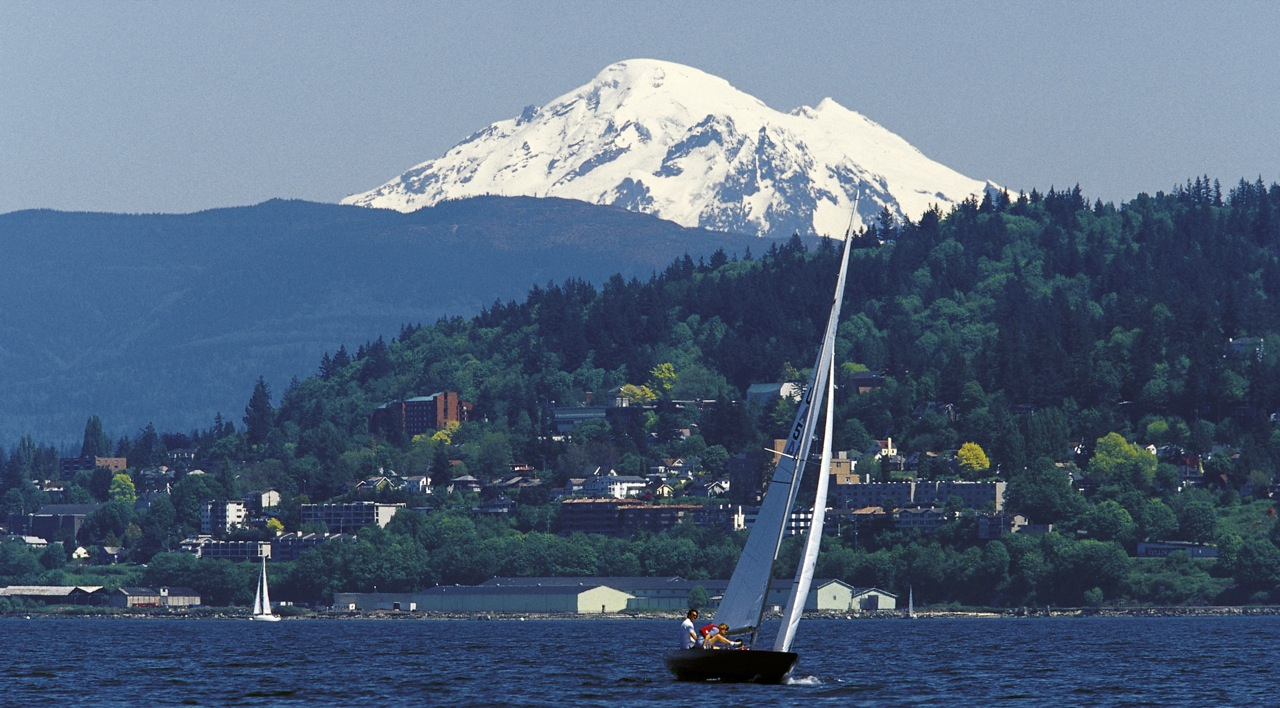
Sailing in Bellingham Bay, with Mount Baker visible in the background

=== Events ===
Bellingham, Washington holds a run and walk marathon along the Bellingham Bay. There are three marathon races to choose from including a full marathon, half marathon, 10k, and/or 5k. Bellingham Bay Marathon, BBM, is a Boston marathon qualifier. Furthermore, all BBM courses are USATF-certified. The Bellingham Bay marathon was founded in 2003 by the Bellingham Bay Swim Team. In addition, 100% of net proceeds benefit Whatcom County youth non-profit organizations.

== Bay Clean-up ==
=== Demonstration Pilot ===
In 1996, federal, state, tribal, and local governments came together to form the Bellingham Bay Demonstration Pilot team. The mission of the pilot team was to develop an approach to clean up contamination, control pollution sources and restore habitat among the Bay. In addition, they put into consideration the land and water uses at state cleanup sites around Bellingham Bay. The pilot team is co-managed by the Department of Ecology and Port of Bellingham, with Ecology as the lead agency for the pilot program. The pilot team is carrying out the strategy for 12 priority sites around the bay, in the future. Furthermore, In early 2013, Ecology revised its Sediment Management Standards to establish a new framework for identification and cleanup of contaminated sediment sites.

== See also ==
- List of fishes of the Salish Sea
- Whatcom Trail
