= Samish Indian Nation =

Federally-recognized Indian tribe in Washington state

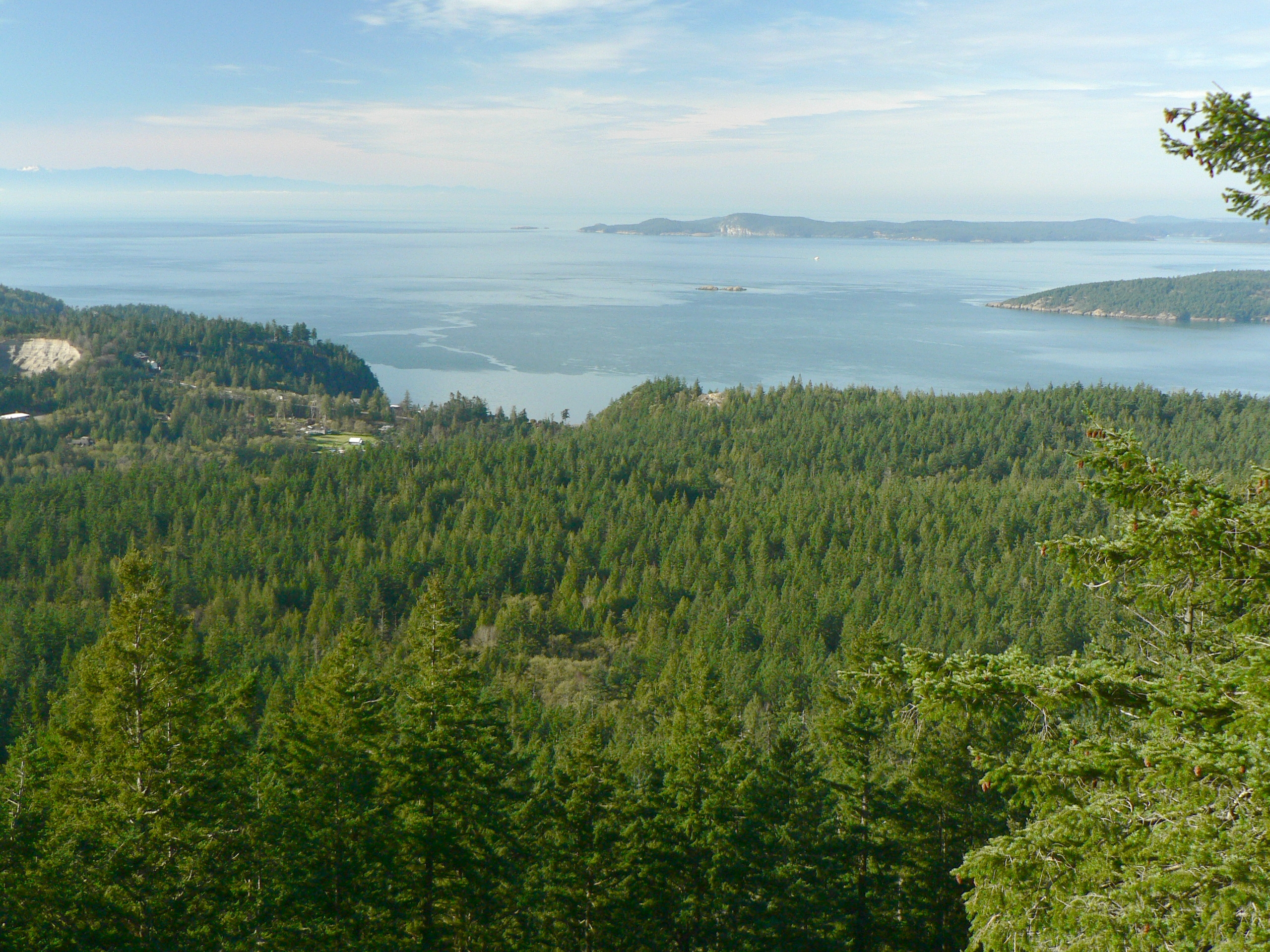
- View of Fidalgo Island

Total population
- 2,000

Regions with significant populations
- United States (Washington)

Languages
- Samish, English

Religion
- Traditional

Related ethnic groups
- Lummi, Saanich, Semiahmoo, Songhees, and Sooke peoples

The Samish Indian Nation is a federally recognized tribe of Samish people (Samish: Xws7ámesh) located in Skagit County, Washington. The Samish Indian Nation is a signatory to the Treaty of Point Elliott of 1855 and has a government-to-government relationship with the United States of America. The Samish are a Northern Straits branch of Central Coast Salish peoples. The Samish Nation is headquartered in Anacortes, Fidalgo Island, in Washington, north of Puget Sound and into current day Canada.

The Washington state ferry Samish, dedicated in summer 2015, is named for the Samish Nation.

== History ==
The Samish Nation is a signatory to the Point Elliott Treaty of 1855; ravaged by introduced diseases, only 150 Samish people remained of an earlier population of 2,000. The treaty established several reservations in the area, including nearby Swinomish, but many Samish chose to remain on islands in their ancestral areas, among them Fidalgo, Guemes and the San Juans. The Samish Nation was mistakenly left off of a BIA list of federally recognized indigenous nations in 1969, and subsequently was left out of a court ruling upholding treaty fishing rights. Samish won restoration of its federal recognition in 1996 and began acquiring land and working toward restoration of its treaty rights.

== Government ==
The Nation's headquarters is in Anacortes, Washington. The Nation is governed by a democratically elected council:

- Chairman: Thomas Wooten
- Vice Chairman: Tim King
- Secretary: Nicole Smith
- Treasurer: Tamara Rogers
- Council Member: Theresa Metcalf
- Council Member: Gary D. Hatch
- Council Member: Jenna Strand.

Government departments: Archives, Chelángen, Conservation Law Enforcement, Early Learning, Education, Elders, Emergency Management, Enrollment, Finance, Health, Housing, Human Resources, IT, Library, Natural Resources, Planning, Prevention and Intervention, Purchased and Referred Care, Social Services, Tribal Historic Preservation, Tribal Vocational Rehabilitation, Tribal Wellness, and Xws7ameshqen. The government is managed by a Chief Operations Officer and Chief Financial Officer.

== Land base ==
The Samish Nation's historical territory includes west Fidalgo Island, Guemes Island, Samish Island, Lopez Island, and southeast San Juan Island. A 19th century promise of a reservation was not fulfilled, but the Samish Nation has been building a land base since the 1990s. The Samish Nation now owns more than 200 acres, including 78 acres held in trust at Campbell Lake on Fidalgo Island. Other lands: Fidalgo Bay Resort, site of landings during the annual Canoe Journey; Huckleberry Island, which was granted to Samish by the State of Washington with the provision that it remain open for public use; additional acreage on Campbell Lake; agricultural land on Thomas Creek; a proposed commercial development site on Highway 20 and Thompson Road in Anacortes; Samish Nation administration complexes on Commercial Avenue in downtown Anacortes and on Highway 20 in Summit Park; Samish Longhouse preschool and child care center; the waterfront Cannery Building adjacent to Seafarers Memorial Park; and uplands and tidelands on Mud Bay on Lopez Island.

== Language and culture ==
Through cooperative agreements and cultural exchanges fostered by the Samish Nation, numerous ancestral objects have been returned to Samish, among them a house post from the last longhouse on Guemes Island (Burke Museum); a canoe believed to date from ca. 1855 (San Juan Island Historical Museum); and 11 baskets, four hats, two cattail mats, two weaving shuttles, two mesh sticks used in making nets, a wooden serving dish, a wooden water bucket, a piece of twine, and a stone hammer (Karshner Museum and Center for Culture and Arts).

While English is commonly spoken, the traditional language is Samish, a dialect of Straits Salish, a Central Salish language. The Nation's language preservation program has recorded more than 60 hours of interviews with fluent speakers; language program manager Kelly Popólxmot Hall teaches the Samish language.

The Nation hosts Camp Samish every year. Regularly scheduled classes give Samish people the opportunity to learn basket making, hat making, and other cedar work.

== Notable Samish ==
- Herman “Jinks” Blackinton (1892–1974), member of the Samish Tribal Council. His grandson, Jeff Morris, Tsimshian, served in the Washington state House of Representatives from 1997 to 2020.
- Charles Edwards (1866–1948), master carver and political leader. Edwards carved The Telegraph, a famous racing canoe, circa 1905, now on display at a museum on nearby Whidbey Island; the Question Mark 2, a racing canoe carved in 1936 after the original Question Mark went into retirement; and a 60-foot pole in 1938 that depicted important cultural figures. He represented the Samish before the U.S. Court of Claims in 1926 in “The Duwamish, et al Tribes of Indians vs. United States.” His son, Alfred, served as chairman of the Samish Indian Nation. A great-granddaughter, Barbara James, is treasurer and former vice chairwoman of the Swinomish Tribe
- Margaret Cagey Greene (1924–2016), chairwoman of the Samish Nation during its successful fight for restoration of its government-to-government relationship with the United States. She was chairwoman from 1971 to 1974 and 1987–1996. Three federal cases bear her name: Greene v. Lujan, No. C89-645Z, 1992 WL 533059; Greene v. United States, 996 F.2d 973 (9th Cir.1993), and Greene v. Babbitt, 64 F.3d 1266,1269 (9th Cir. 1995). "Our Samish people have survived," she told New York Times reporter Timothy Egan in 1992. "We have conquered the urban area. We have people working at Boeing. We have teachers. We have pilots. But we still want our Indian identity."
- Ken Hansen (1952–2006), longtime chairman of the Samish Indian Nation, led the effort to restore Samish's government-to-government relationship with the United States.
- Marco Hatch, marine biologist and professor
