= List of Lushootseed-speaking peoples =

The Lushootseed-speaking peoples, sometimes known as the Lushootseed people, are a group of Indigenous peoples of the Pacific Northwest who speak the Lushootseed language.

Lushootseed-speaking groups were traditionally politically autonomous at the local, or village, level, so there was no historical term to refer to all Lushootseed-speaking peoples. Words like (dxʷ)ləšucid ʔacʔaciɬtalbixʷ or ʔacʔaciɬtalbixʷ kʷi gʷədxʷləšucideb (lit. "Lushootseed peoples" or "Peoples who speak Lushootseed") are sometimes used in modern times.

All historically attested extended village groups or bands are listed, grouped by modern-day tribal units, sub-units, and further sub-units:

== Northern Lushootseed ==
Northern Lushootseed (dxʷləšucid) is spoken by peoples living generally in Island, Skagit, Snohomish, and parts of Whatcom counties. Northern Lushootseed-speaking communities include:

- Upper Skagit – sqaǰətabš
  - Nuwhaha – dxʷʔaha
    - Lake Whatcom village – sx̌ačuʔabš
    - Lake Samish village – stiksabš
  - Nookachamps – duqʷəčabš
    - Mount Vernon village – dᶻalqahabš
    - Big Lake village - cəlaɬabš
  - Mesekwegwils – bəsikʷigʷilc
  - Chobaabish – čubəʔabš
  - Baslo'alo – baslux̌ʔalux̌
  - Smaliwhu – sbaliʔxʷ
  - Silayucid – sʔilayucid
  - Beskayucid – bəsq̓ixʷucid
  - Miskaiwhu – bəsq̓ixʷixʷ
  - Kwabatsabsh – k̓ʷabacabš
- Sauk – saʔqʷəbixʷ
  - Suiattle – suyaƛ̕bixʷ
- Stillaguamish – stuləgʷabš
  - Quadsack – qʷacaʔkʷbixʷ
- Swinomish – swədəbš
  - Squinamish – sqʷədəbš
  - Kikiallus – kikiyalus
  - (Lower) Skagit – sqaǰətabš
- Snohomish – sduhubš
  - Quil Ceda – qʷəl̕sidəʔəbš
  - Whidbey Island Snohomish – dəgʷasx̌abš
  - Sdodohobsh – sduduhubš
  - N'Quentlmamish – dxʷkʷiƛ̕əbabš

== Southern Lushootseed ==
Southern Lushootseed, otherwise known as Twulshootseed (txʷəlšucid) is spoken by the various peoples, historical and contemporary, located in King, Pierce, Thurston, Mason, and Kitsap counties. Southern Lushootseed communities include:

- Skykomish – sq̓ixʷəbš
  - Staktalijamish – st̕aq̓taliǰabš
  - Upper Skykomish/Index people – bəsx̌əx̌əx̌əlč
- Duwamish – dxʷdəwʔabš
  - Shilshole – šilšulabš
  - Hachuamish – x̌ačuʔabš
    - Thornton Creek band – dəxʷx̌ʷubilabš
    - Union Bay band – sluʔwiɬabš
    - Renton band
    - May Creek band – šabalʔtxʷabš
    - Stkehlmish – saʔcaqaɬəbš
    - Juanita Creek band – təbɬtubixʷ
  - Sammamish – sc̓ababš
  - Stkamish – stəqabš
- Suquamish – dxʷsəq̓ʷəbš
  - Saktamish – sx̌aq̓tabš
- Puyallup – spuyaləpabš
  - Hylebos Creek band – sx̌ax̌ƛ̕abš
  - Clarks Creek band – txʷskʷaqʷabš
  - Simons Creek band – sqʷədabš
  - Homamish – sxʷəbabš
  - Shotlemamish – dəxʷsx̌əƛ̕əbabš
  - Steilacoom – č̓tilqʷəbabš
    - Clover Creek band
- Nisqually – dxʷsqʷaliʔabš
  - Sequalitchew – sčəgʷaličabš
  - Lower Nisqually
  - Clear Creek band
  - Nisqually Lake band
  - Muck Creek band
  - Meshal/Mashel – bəšalabš
- Squaxin Island – sqʷax̌sədəbš
  - Sahewamish – shiʔwəbš
  - T'Peeksin – təpikʷšədabš
  - Squiatl – sk̓ʷəyaiɬəbš
  - Stechass – st̕č̓asəbš
  - Nusechatl – dəxʷč̓ič̓aʔaɬabš

=== Whulshootseed ===
Whulshootseed (xʷəlšucid) refers to the large subdialect of Southern Lushootseed spoken by the Snoqualmie and Muckleshoot peoples.

- Snoqualmie – sdukʷalbixʷ
  - Tolt band – x̌alalʔtxʷabš
  - Upper Snoqualmie/North Bend band – baqʷababš
  - Fall City band
- Muckleshoot – bəqəlšuɬ
  - Skopamish – sxʷq̓ʷupabš
    - Yilalkoamish – ʔilalqʷuʔabš
    - Soos/Susabsh – sʔusabš
  - Smulkamish – sbalqʷuʔabš
  - Stuck River band – stəx̌ʷabš
  - Upper Puyallup
  - Tkwakwamish – dxʷxʷaq̓ʷabš
  - South Prairie Creek band

== See also ==
- Twana peoples
- List of Halkomelem-speaking peoples
