= Lushootseed grammar =

Grammar of the Lushootseed language

Lushootseed grammar (Note: Northern Lushootseed: dxʷləšucid Southern Lushootseed: txʷəlšucid Muckleshoot and Snoqualmie dialects: xʷəlšucid) is the grammar of the Lushootseed language, a Central Coast Salish language of the Salishan language family.

== Syntax and word order ==
=== Word order ===
Lushootseed can be considered a relatively agglutinating language, given its high number of morphemes, including a large number of lexical suffixes. Word order is fairly flexible, although it is generally considered to be verb-subject-object (VSO).

Lushootseed is capable of creating grammatically correct sentences that contain only a verb, with no subject or object. All information beyond the action is to be understood by context. This can be demonstrated in ʔuʔəy’dub '[someone] managed to find [someone/something]'. Sentences which contain no verb at all are also common, as Lushootseed has no copula. An example of such a sentence is stab əw̓ə tiʔiɫ 'What [is] that?'.

Despite its general status as VSO, Lushootseed can be rearranged to be subject-verb-object (SVO) and verb-object-subject (VOS). Doing so does not modify the words themselves, but may require the particle ʔə to mark the change. The exact nature of this particle is the subject of some debate.

The main reason for the change of word order in Lushootseed is the fact that a subject pronoun must come second in a sentence. Normally, in VSO word order, the subject comes second. However, if a zero copula is used, the word order is changed to object-subject to preserve the subject-pronoun-second rule. A similar scenario occurs with the negator xʷiʔ.

dxʷləbiʔ čəxʷ ʔu 'Are you Lummi?'

xʷiʔ čəd lədxʷləbiʔ 'I am not Lummi.'

Here, negation takes the first position, the subject pronoun takes the second, and 'Lummi' is pushed to the end of the sentence.

=== Prepositions ===
Prepositions in Lushootseed are almost entirely handled by one word, ʔal, which can mean 'on, above, in, beside, around' among a number of potential other meanings. They come before the object they reference, much like in English. Examples of this can be found in the following sentences:

1. stab əw̓ə tiʔiɫ ʔal tə stuləkʷ 'What is that in the river?'
2. ʔuyayus ti dbad ʔal tudiʔ 'My father is working over there.'
3. šəqabac ʔal ti piit 'On top of the bed.' (this example is interesting as šəqabac actually means 'on top of a large/bulky object' on its own, but still contains the ʔal preposition)

=== Determiners ===
Determiners usually come before a noun they belong to, and have two possible genders "masculine" (the default) and "feminine". However, in a sentence reordered to become SVO, such as sqʷəbayʔ ti ʔučalatəb ʔə tiʔiɬ wiw'su 'The dog is what the children chased' the determiner for sqʷəbayʔ 'dog' comes after the noun, instead of before it.

Gender distinction in Lushootseed primarily manifests in the addition of a feminine infix -s- within the determiner, following immediately after the first sound of the word. For example, tiʔiɬ 'that' becomes tsiʔiɬ 'that (feminine)'. The sequence [ts] is not spelled with c in these contexts.

Northern Lushootseed
Masculine (default)	Feminine	Meaning	Usage
tə	tsə	'the', 'a'	A generic demonstrative. Sometimes pronounced ta/tsa
ti	tsi	'the'	For nouns that have only one possible reference, such as names
kʷi	kʷsi	'a/an', 'some'	Generic or hypothetical
tiʔəʔ	tsiʔəʔ	'this'	Proximal
tiʔiɬ	tsiʔiɬ	'that'	Distal

Southern Lushootseed
Masculine (default)	Feminine	Meaning	Usage
tə	tsə	'the', 'a'	A generic demonstrative. Sometimes pronounced ta/tsa
šə	sə	'the'	For nouns that have only one possible reference, such as names
kʷi	kʷsi	'a/an', 'some'	Generic or hypothetical
ti	tsi	'this'	Proximal
tiiɬ	tsiiɬ	'that'	Distal

== Pronouns ==
Lushootseed has four subject pronouns: čəd 'I' (first-person singular), čəɬ 'we' (first-person plural), čəxʷ 'you' (second-person singular), and čələp 'you' (second-person plural).

Pronouns of Lushootseed
	First Person	Second Person	Third Person
Singular	čəd	čəxʷ	∅
Plural	čəɬ	čələp	(h)əlgʷəʔ

The third person plural (which is always optional) loses its h- after a voiced sound (or a vowel in some dialects)

== Verbs ==
=== Verb prefixes ===
Almost all instances of a verb in Lushootseed (excluding the zero copula) carry a prefix indicating their tense and/or aspect. Below is a (non-exhaustive) list of these prefixes, along with their meanings and applications.

Prefix	Usage
ʔəs-	Imperfective present (non-motion verbs)
lə-	Imperfective present (motion verbs)
ʔu-	Completed telic actions
tu-	Past
ɬu-	Future
ƛ̕u-	Habitual
gʷ(ə)-	Subjunctive/future

The prefix ʔəs- is one of the most common. It indicates an imperfective aspect-present tense (similar to English '-ing') for verbs that do not involve motion. More specifically, a verb may use ʔəs- if it does not result in a change of position for its subject. It is commonly known as a "state of being":

ʔəsƛ̕ubil čəd. 'I am feeling fine.' or 'I am in good health.'

If a verb does involve motion, the ʔəs- prefix is replaced with lə-:

ləƛ̕a čəd ʔálʔal. 'I'm going home.'

Completed or telic actions use the prefix ʔu-. Most verbs without ʔəs- or lə- will use ʔu-. Some verbs also exhibit a contrast in meaning between lə- and ʔu-, and only one of them is correct:

ʔusaxʷəb čəxʷ. 'You jump(ed).'

The verb saxʷəb literally means 'to jump, leap, or run, especially in a short burst of energy', and is correctly used with ʔu-. In contrast, the verb təlawil, which means 'to jump or run for an extended period of time', is used with lə-:

lətəlawil čəxʷ. 'You are jumping.'

=== Negation ===
Negation in Lushootseed takes the form of an adverb xʷiʔ 'no, none, nothing' which always comes at the beginning of the sentence that is to be negated. It is constructed in two possible ways, one for negatives of existence, and one for negatives of identity. If taking the form of a negative of identity, a proclitic lə- must be added to the sentence on the next adverb. If there are no further adverbs in the sentence, the proclitic attaches to the head word of the predicate, as in the sentence xʷiʔ čəxʷ sixʷ ləbakʷɬ 'Don't get hurt again'.

== Other morphology ==
=== Possession ===
There are five possessive affixes, derived from the pronouns:

Possessive Suffixes
	First Person	Second Person	Third Person
Singular	d-	ad-	-s
Plural	-čəɬ	-ləp	(none)

The third person singular -s is considered marginal and does not work with an actual lexical possessor.

=== Derivational morphology ===
Lushootseed has a wide variety of miscellaneous derivational affixes. Most of them apply to nouns to change their exact meaning, but several can change nouns to verbs or vice versa.

- dxʷ-: the prefix dxʷ- means 'permeate, throughout, filled with, covered with'. It marks stems by converting '[noun]' to 'thing serving to contain [noun]', for containers that hold the stem noun in a distributed manner; compare dxʷ- with -ali 'place for keeping [noun]'. This prefix is also carried by words relating to the mind, known as the x̌əč. Many stems begin with dxʷ- in Lushootseed, including the name of the language itself (dxʷləšucid).
- -ali: this suffix refers to a place or building for storing its stem. It differs from dxʷ- in that it does not mean 'something filled or covered with'. Hence, dᶻədisali 'gums' (literally 'place for storing teeth') can not refer to something 'covered with teeth'.
- -alʔtxʷ (also observed -ʔaltxʷ): this suffix refers more generally to a 'place or building of [stem]'. It can also refer to the location of something. For example, t̕uʔəlalʔtxʷ, the location of a former Duwamish village, means "herring house," referring not to a literal herring house but to the herring which were prolific there.
