= Sammamish people =

Lushootseed-speaking people of Puget Sound

Sammamish
sc̓ababš

Regions with significant populations
- King County, Washington, United States

Languages
- Lushootseed (Southern), English

Religion
- Indigenous religion, Christianity, including syncretic forms

Related ethnic groups
- Other Lushootseed-speaking peoples, especially Duwamish and Snoqualmie

The Sammamish people (Lushootseed: sc̓ababš) (Note: Also spelled sc̓əpabš) are a Lushootseed-speaking Southern Coast Salish people. They are indigenous to the Sammamish River Valley in central King County, Washington. The Sammamish speak Lushootseed, a Coast Salish language which was historically spoken across most of Puget Sound, although its usage today is mostly reserved for cultural and ceremonial practices.

Historically, the Sammamish were a distinct tribe. The 1855 Treaty of Point Elliott assigned the Sammamish people to Tulalip Reservation, and today many of their descendants are citizens of the Tulalip Tribes of Washington. Other Sammamish people moved to other reservations in the region, and today their descendants are citizens of the Muckleshoot Indian Tribe, Snoqualmie Indian Tribe, and Suquamish Indian Tribe of the Port Madison Reservation.

The historical extent of Sammamish territory ranges from the northern head of Lake Washington to Issaquah Creek at the south of Lake Sammamish, where they have hunted, fished, and gathered for over 10,000 years. The Sammamish had several villages along the length of the river, with the largest being at ƛ̕ax̌ʷadis, what is now Kenmore. The Sammamish were historically a warlike, but impoverished people, and were closely allied with their neighbors, the Duwamish and the Snoqualmie. Traditional Sammamish society revolved around their two lakes, Lake Washington and Lake Sammamish, more than the Sammamish River which connects the two.

In the early 19th century, the Sammamish were one of the first peoples of Puget Sound to come into contact with the traders from the Hudson's Bay Company. During this period, the Sammamish participated in several wars, such as the 1855 Puget Sound War and the 1856 Battle of Seattle, as well as raiding other tribes. In 1855, the Sammamish attended, but did not sign, the Treaty of Point Elliott. Despite this, they were removed from their land and sent to the Tulalip Reservation, where many Sammamish descendants live today. Other Sammamish continued to live in their traditional homeland along the Sammamish River but later moved to neighboring reservations.

== Name ==
The name "Sammamish" is an anglicization of their Lushootseed endonym, sc̓ababš, also spelled sc̓əpabš.

The etymology of the name sc̓ababš is disputed among historians and linguists, and there are several possible etymologies. The name is derived from a root word and the suffix =abš, meaning "people." According to linguist and anthropologist T.T. Waterman, the name means "meander dwellers." According to historian and writer David Buerge, the name might derive from the word sc̓ap, meaning "willow," which would mean their name translates to "willow people."

The first American settlers also called the Sammamish various names such as "Squak", "Simump", and "Squowh." These names are anglicizations of the Lushootseed word sqawx̌, (Note: Also spelled sqʷaxʷ) the name for Issaquah Creek and the location of a Sammamish village.

== Classification ==
The Sammamish are a Southern Coast Salish people. They were historically closely related to and allied with their immediate neighbors, who today constitute the Snoqualmie and the various subgroups of the Duwamish people, such as the təbɬtubixʷ, the Juanita Creek people. Because of these ties, early American settlers often believed that the Sammamish were a subgroup of the Duwamish, or that the Duwamish were a subgroup of the Sammamish. However, the Sammamish were a completely sovereign and autonomous group from their Duwamish neighbors. Some historians have continued to classify the Sammamish as a Duwamish subgroup.

Despite being a primarily riverine people, the Sammamish were historically considered by their contemporaries as x̌ačuʔabš, or "lake people," referring to the peoples living on Lake Washington, and, broadly, any lake at all. This is opposed to other ethnic identifiers, such as the x̌ʷəlčabš (saltwater peoples), stuləgʷabš (riverine peoples), st̕aq̓tabš (inland peoples), and so forth. This is due to the traditional lifestyle of the Sammamish, which relied much more on the resources of Lake Washington, rather than from their own river, than other riverine groups in the area.

== History ==
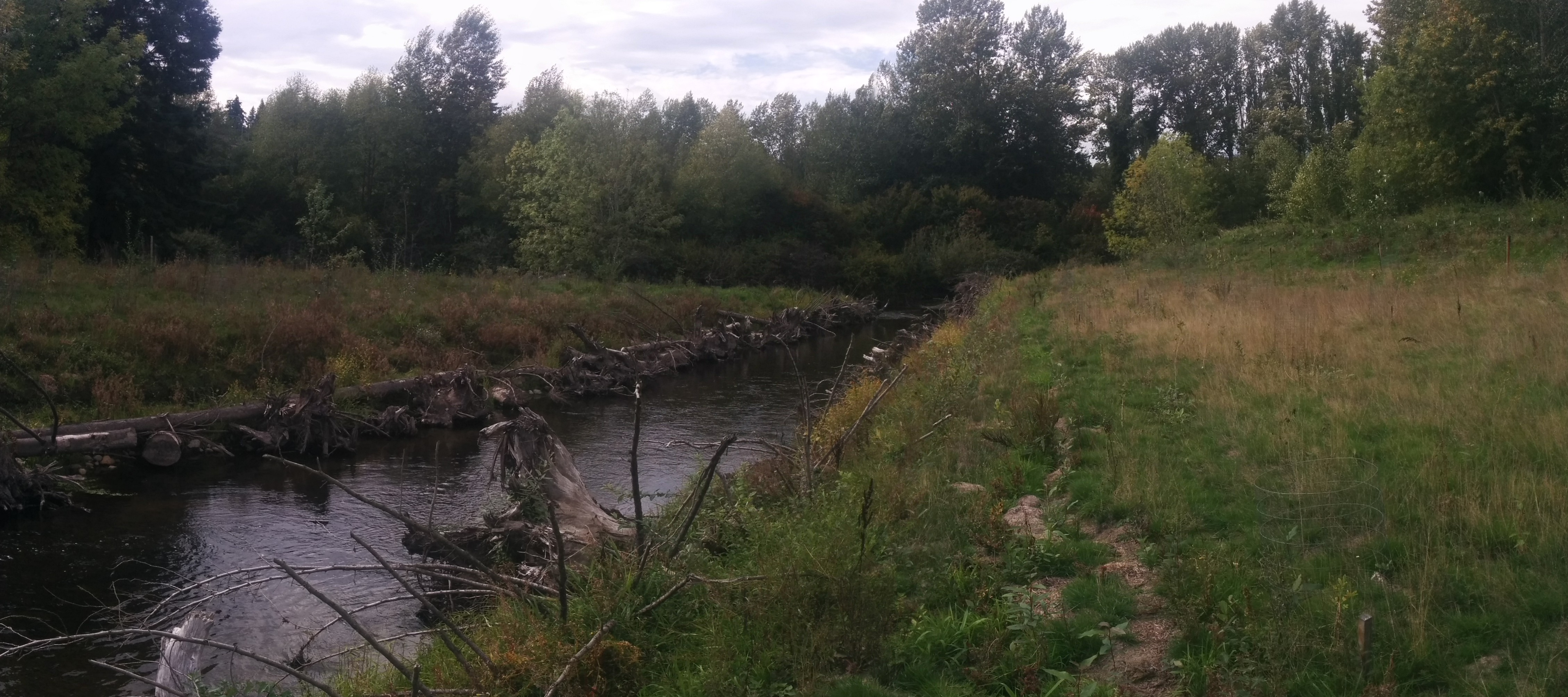
Confluence of Bear Creek and Sammamish River in Redmond, Washington

For more than 10,000 years, the Sammamish people have hunted, fished, and gathered on their lands along Lake Washington and the Sammamish River and Lake. The Sammamish were a relatively poor people, and they were also noted by their neighbors for their tendency towards warfare. War was uncommon in the region, and whilst warriors were respected, warfare was seen as a social negative. For this reason, the Sammamish were looked down upon by many of their contemporaries, who viewed them as uncouth and rowdy.

The Sammamish were one of the first peoples to trade with overland traders from the Hudson's Bay Company.

Around 1832, the Sammamish went raiding against the Lower Skagit (sqaǰətabš) of Whidbey Island. A Sammamish raiding party traveled to Penn Cove to attack the Lower Skagit village at čubəʔalšəd (Snatelum Point). The raid was initially successful, as the Skagit began to flee across Penn Cove to təqucid (Oak Harbor) with the Sammamish raiders in tow. However, it was ultimately unsuccessful, as the Sammamish river canoes, unsuitable for the open waters of the Puget Sound, capsized, allowing the Skagit to escape. The Sammamish returned home overland, building makeshift rafts to cross the water. It was theorized by historian David Buerge that the poor resources of the Sammamish River Valley led to their tendency for raiding.

In the 1850s, the population of the Sammamish, including those living along both the Sammamish River and Lake Sammamish, was estimated to be as high as 200 people.

In 1855, the United States government signed the Treaty of Point Elliott with appointed leaders of most of the Puget Sound peoples, headed by Seattle (Suquamish/Duwamish) and Chief Patkanim (Snoqualmie). Although the Sammamish were listed in the preamble of the treaty, they did not sign the treaty. Despite this, Governor Isaac Stevens moved to enforce the treaty on the Sammamish even before it was ratified by Congress. One prominent leader of the Sammamish, Sahwicholgadhw, did not accept the treaty, and resisted the attempts of the Americans to remove the Sammamish from their homelands. Although David 'Doc' Maynard, the Indian Agent at the time, pressured the Sammamish into relocating, the Sammamish continued to refuse the efforts of the Americans.

Under Sahwicholgadhw, some Sammamish warriors took part in the Puget Sound War against the United States, and participated in the 1856 Battle of Seattle. Led by the Yakama and Wenatchi, the Sammamish joined the assault on the young town, in which almost every building was burned.

Following the conclusion of the unsuccessful Puget Sound War, many Sammamish were relocated to Fort Kitsap, where the Sammamish remained until their eventual assignment to the Tulalip Reservation. Henry Yesler, local sawmill owner and one of the founders of Seattle, aided in the removal of the Sammamish from their homelands. After their removal, the villages were destroyed by settlers. As with the relocation of other Northwest Coast peoples, Indian removal was significantly enabled by the 1862 Pacific Northwest smallpox epidemic which killed almost two-thirds of the Sammamish population, as well as by the devastation from the effects of several previous epidemics.

Because of this relocation, many Sammamish were amalgamated into other tribes, such as the Suquamish, Snoqualmie, and Tulalip tribes, where many of the descendants of the Sammamish live today. Some Sammamish continued to refuse to move to the Tulalip Reservation and continued to live in the area as laborers and farmers. The last independent Sammamish continued to practice their traditions until the 1900s and 1910s, when the last visible traces of Sammamish people in the Sammamish River Valley would practically disappear. In 2009, only 69 people in Kenmore – once the largest Sammamish village – were Native American. They were likely not all of Sammamish descent, although the exact number is not known.

== Territory and villages ==
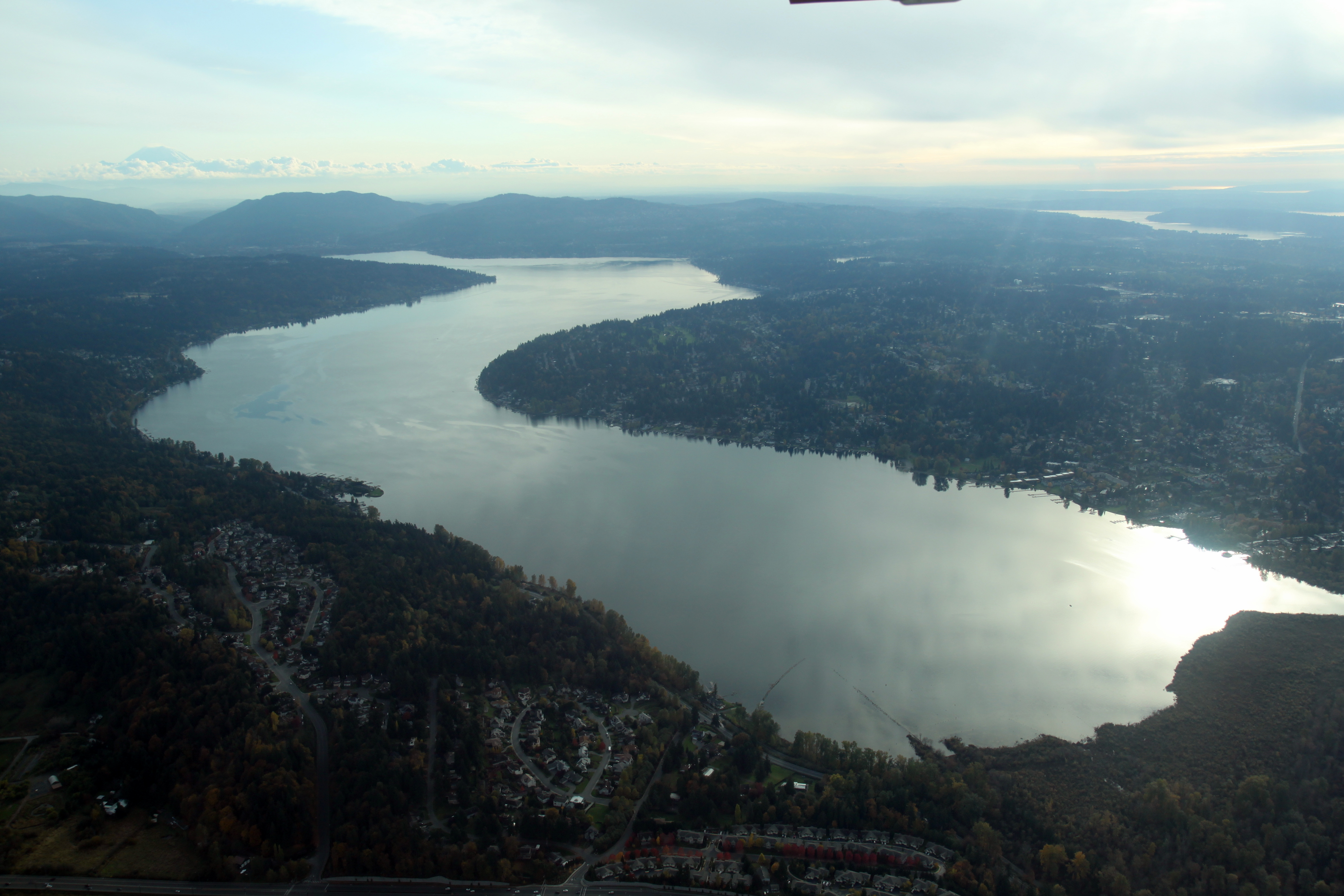
Aerial view of Lake Sammamish

The traditional territory of the Sammamish includes all of Lake Sammamish and the Sammamish River. The Sammamish hunted in the surrounding forests, fished along the lakes, the river and the nearby creeks, and gathered in the marshes and flats nearby.

Sammamish villages consisted of large longhouses, constructed of great cedar planks and poles. Houses were around 50 feet by 100 feet and could hold several families at a time, sometimes amounting to hundreds of people. Longhouses were divided so that each family had a "room" and a central fire pit, only partially-separated by partitions.

The Sammamish had several villages along the Sammamish River and Lake Sammamish, with the largest being at ƛ̕ax̌ʷadis, the head of Lake Washington near what is now Kenmore. This site was at the mouth of the Sammamish River before Lake Washington was drained by 10 feet, which, at the time, was near where Swamp Creek (dxʷɬəq̓ab) is today. The furthest upriver village was at the mouth of sqawx̌ (Issaquah Creek). Its low prestige was widely known by the nearby saltwater peoples. Among the Elliott Bay villages, it was common to reprimand misbehaving children by telling them they were acting as if they were from sqawx̌.

== Culture ==
=== Society ===
Traditional Sammamish society was highly stratified, made up of two main classes, as well as a separate slave class. Social standing was determined by social prestige, power, and family ties. Villages were roughly democratic oligarchies, with the eldest or most prestigious members of a family forming a village council, at which matters were decided in a democratic fashion. Slaves were prisoners of war or children of slaves, and slavery was generally for life, although there were some exceptions.

Sammamish society and life was based around the yearly cycle of summertime hunting, gathering, and fishing all throughout their territory, before people would stay in their villages during the winter to feast and to engage in ceremonies. Large potlatches would be thrown as a display of wealth and prestige, where relatives from distant villages would be invited to receive lavish gifts, alongside gambling, dancing, and storytelling.

=== Natural resources ===
Like other Northwest Coast peoples, cedar was, and continues to be, the most critical resource for the Sammamish. Canoes, houses, clothing, paddles, toys, baskets, nets, weirs, and much more can be fashioned out of cedar. Other types of wood were used for various applications as well. Bows were made of yew or maple, and madrona was used in cooking and other fire-resistant tools.

Cattails are also critical to the traditional ways of the Sammamish. They can be used for making blankets, sleeping pads, pillows, hats, skirts, and even giant mats, which were used to make large tents for camping during the summer months.

Fish, most importantly salmon, were caught in canoes, with spears and nets, or on giant fishing weirs, constructed over the length of a creek, where massive amounts of fish could be easily caught. Although some salmon was eaten fresh, most salmon would be dried or smoked and could be eaten with dried berries or baked camas. Berries were gathered in many places, from swamps, to prairies, to the foothills of the Issaquah Alps. Other types of game were caught and consumed fresh, as well as used for pelts or feathers, such as waterfowl and deer, however the traditionally lake-oriented lifestyle of the Sammamish relied more on aquatic resources like fish than their riverine neighbors.

=== Language ===
Like their Duwamish and Snoqualmie relatives, the Sammamish traditionally speak Lushootseed, a Coast Salish language spoken across Puget Sound. The Sammamish dialect is Southern Lushootseed, spoken by the Lushootseed-speaking peoples south of the Snohomish. The Sammamish dialect is closely related to the Duwamish and Snoqualmie dialects.

Today, Lushootseed has no first-language speakers and is primarily reserved for ceremonial and cultural contexts, like storytelling and prayer. Despite this, the Tulalip and Snoqualmie tribes are working to revitalize the language, and it is taught in several colleges and high schools in the area, both tribal and non-tribal.

== See also ==
- Coast Salish peoples
- List of Lushootseed-speaking peoples
