= Skykomish people =

Lushootseed-speaking people in Washington (state)

sq̓ixʷəbš
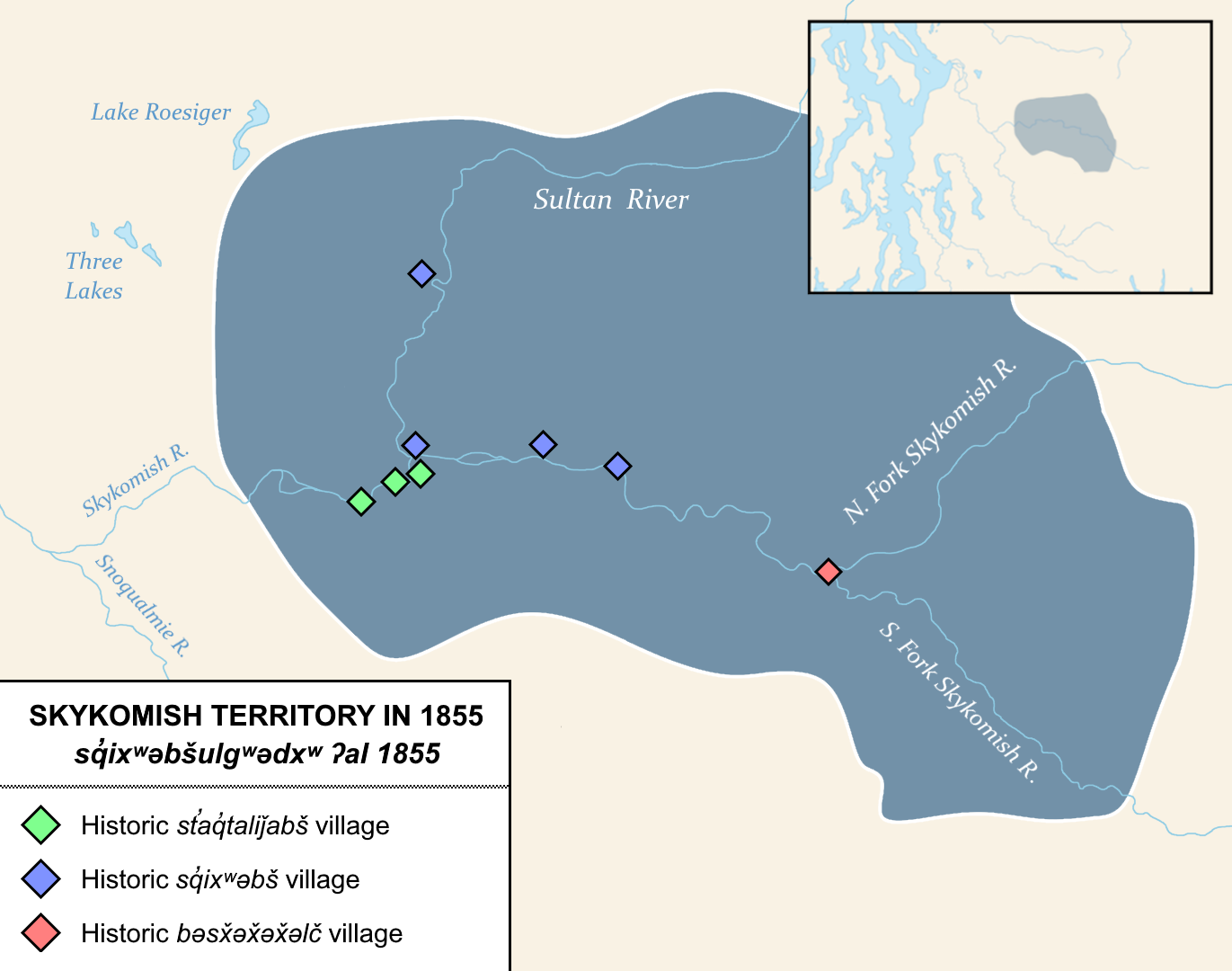
- Skykomish territory in the 19th century

Total population
- Extinct as a tribe

Regions with significant populations
- Washington, US

Languages
- Lushootseed, English

Related ethnic groups
- Other Lushootseed-speaking peoples, esp. the Snohomish and Snoqualmie

The Skykomish (Lushootseed: sq̓ixʷəbš, lit. 'upriver people', IPA: [ˈsqʼexʷ.əbʃ]) are a Lushootseed-speaking Coast Salish people indigenous to the Skykomish Valley in the Cascade Mountains of Washington.

The Skykomish inhabited at least 8 permanent villages with a pre-contact population believed to number in the thousands. Composed of several subgroups, including the bəsx̌əx̌əx̌əlč and st̕aq̓taliǰabš, the Skykomish once had a vast amount of territory stretching across much of the Skykomish drainage system. For thousands of years, the Skykomish followed a seasonal pattern of hunting, fishing, and gathering throughout their territory.

The Skykomish were party to the Treaty of Point Elliott in 1855. After the signing of the treaty, the Skykomish were removed to the Tulalip Reservation, where they gradually intermixed and assimilated with their neighboring and closely related Snohomish and Snoqualmie peoples. By 1871, the Skykomish had begun to virtually disappear from the historical record, generally being classified as Snohomish or Snoqualmie. For this reason, although the Skykomish were once a wholly independent group, the Skykomish people have been variously categorized by scholars as a subgroup of the Snoqualmie people, the Snohomish people, or as a tribe in their own right. Today, the Skykomish are succeeded by the Tulalip Tribes of Washington and the Snoqualmie Indian Tribe.

== Name ==
The name "Skykomish" is derived from their Lushootseed-language endonym, "sq̓ixʷəbš." The name "sq̓ixʷəbš" literally means "upriver people," from √q̓ixʷ, 'upriver' and =abš, 'people of'.

Historically, the Skykomish have also been known in English as the Skaiwhamish, Seawamish, and Skywamish. In the Point Elliott Treaty, both Skaiwhamish and Skai-wha-mish are used.

The Skykomish River, Skykomish Peak, Skykomish Valley, and the Town of Skykomish are all named after the tribe. The proposed Skykomish County, named after the river, also bears the name of the Skykomish.

== Classification ==
A Lushootseed-speaking people, the Skykomish are a Coast Salish people. They are closely related to the neighboring Snohomish and Snoqualmie peoples. The exact classification of the Skykomish has historically been debated. Although some historians believe that the Skykomish are a Snoqualmie or Snohomish subgroup, most experts agree that the Skykomish were historically separate from the Snoqualmie and Snohomish, at least until the historic period.

Early records deem the Skykomish as an independent tribe. The 1855 Treaty of Point Elliott lists the Skykomish as a signatory tribe, separate from the Snohomish and Snoqualmie. As the Skykomish became more and more close to the Snohomish and Snoqualmie in post-treaty times, it became more difficult to distinguish between them and their neighbors, causing a debate among anthropologists and historians.

On June 30, 1960, the Indian Claims Commission ruled against the Snoqualmie Tribe that the Skykomish people were a separate and identifiable people from the Snoqualmie. The Snoqualmie Tribe was hoping to gain compensation for the land ceded to the US government on behalf of the Skykomish. They appealed the decision, but they were again denied. The Snoqualmie Tribe later appealed to the Court of Claims on August 27, 1965. 3 years later, on September 23, 1968, the decision was reversed by Judge Don Nelson Laramore, granting the Snoqualmie Tribe a settlement of $257,698.29 in compensation for the Snoqualmie and Skykomish combined.

Today, the Skykomish do not have a federally recognized tribe of their own. Instead, they are succeeded by the Tulalip Tribes of Washington and Snoqualmie Indian Tribe.

=== Subgroups ===
The Skykomish can be divided into at least two subgroups: the sq̓ixʷəbš, (the Skykomish proper) and the bəsx̌əx̌əx̌əlč (the Index people). The Skykomish people and the Index people were very different. The Skykomish were known for their skills in poling river canoes, while the Index people were known for their aptitude in quickly traversing the difficult terrain of the Cascade mountains.

There was also the st̕aq̓taliǰabš, a powerful group who had several villages along the Sultan River.

== History ==
During the early colonial period, and after the establishment of Fort Nisqually in 1833, the Skykomish traveled to the fort to trade with members of the Hudson's Bay Company.

In 1849, the Skykomish, along with their Snoqualmie allies, attacked Fort Nisqually. However, during the Puget Sound War of 1855–56, the Skykomish remained neutral, following the lead of the prominent pro-American Snoqualmie leader Patkanim.

In 1855, the Treaty of Point Elliott was signed at bək̓ʷəɬtiwʔ, what is now Mukilteo. Seven Skykomish representatives signed the treaty: Smehmaihu, Lugsken, Weaipah, Pehnus, Twooiaskut, Hehmahl, and Stehshail (William). This treaty created the Tulalip Reservation, to which the Skykomish people were made to relocate. To this day, the Skykomish are recognized as one of the founding nations of the Tulalip Tribes.

In the mid-1800s prior to the treaty signing, the population of the Skykomish was estimated at 410–450. On the Tulalip Reservation, the Skykomish population was 144 in the 1860s. The Skykomish began to disappear from official records in the 1870s due to their growing intermarriage with the Snohomish and the Snoqualmie peoples on the reservation.

By 1900, there were about 320 non-reservation Skykomish, living in Sultan and Gold Bar. Prior to colonization and smallpox epidemics, the Skykomish population was possibly in the thousands.

At Juanita Bay in 1933, the Skykomish were represented by Chief Black Thunder, also known as Mr. Bagley in a reenactment of the signing of the 1855 treaty.

In 1960, the Skykomish were denied the right to pursue compensation claims by the Indian Claims Commission because they had no contemporary tribal entity.

== Territory and villages ==
The traditional territory of the Skykomish people consists of the drainage area of the Skykomish River, upriver from the area between Monroe and Sultan. The core area of Skykomish territory was from Sultan to Index. At the time of contact, the Skykomish held roughly 538,040 acres of land along the Skykomish River.

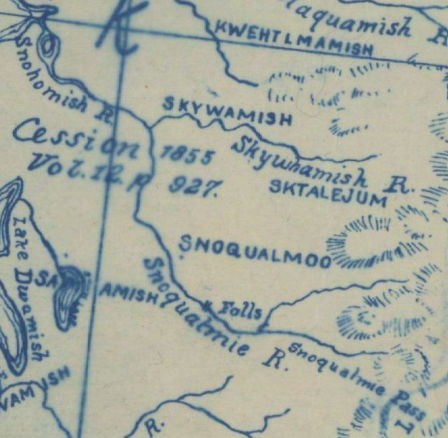
This detail from an 1857 map shows the territory of the Skykomish people (here labeled Skywamish). Also marked on the map is the Sktalejum (st̕aq̓talič) band.

The Skykomish traditionally built their villages along rivers, placed at vital fishing spots to take advantage of fish runs. These villages were inhabited year-round, although summer encampments and houses were also built for temporary use during the summer months. These temporary houses were built in Skykomish territory, along the rivers and in the mountains, as well as outside of their own territory, along the Puget Sound and its islands.

Other than the Snoqualmie and Snohomish, the Skykomish had close relations and frequent contact with several other peoples, namely the Stillaguamish and the Nxaʔamxcín-speaking Wenatchi across the mountains.

List of Skykomish villages
| Group | Name | Anglicization(s) and Alternative Names | Location | Notes |
|---|---|---|---|---|
| st̕aq̓taliǰabš | shikʷigʷilc | Sehkwegwehlts | Across the Skykomish River from Fern Bluff | |
| st̕aq̓taliǰabš | | "Kanim Place" | Near mouth of Elwell Creek | Abandoned in the mid-1800s |
| st̕aq̓taliǰabš | st̕aq̓talič | Stək'talidubc, Sktalejum | Across the Skykomish River from Sultan village | Had a permanent fishery. Main st̕aq̓taliǰabš village |
| sq̓ixʷəbš | dxʷc̓əltəd | Sultan | At present site of Sultan, at mouth of Sultan Creek | One house. Main sq̓ixʷəbš village. |
| sq̓ixʷəbš | | | Along the Sultan River, four miles from the mouth | One house |
| sq̓ixʷəbš | | | At present site of Startup | Low-class, overflow settlement from Sultan and Gold Bar villages |
| sq̓ixʷəbš | | 'xaitəd | At present site of Gold Bar | Several houses with one large potlatch house, popular base camp for elk hunting and salmon fishing |
| bəsx̌əx̌əx̌əlč | x̌əx̌aʔusalʔtxʷ | xe'xausalt | At present site of Index near the confluence | Several houses with one large potlatch house, base camp for those traveling to the Cascade mountains |

== Culture and society ==
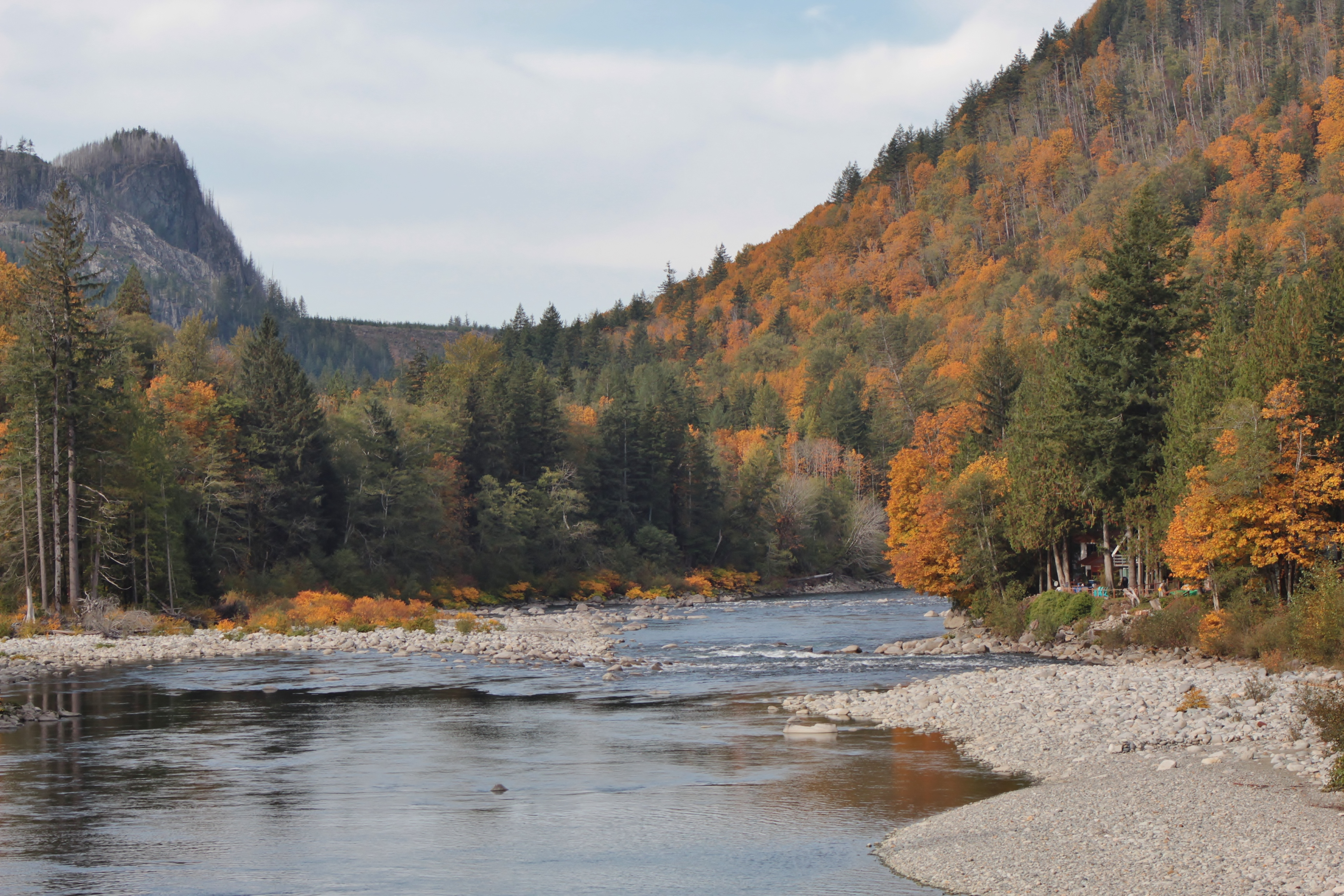
The North Fork of the Skykomish River near the former village of x̌əx̌aʔusalʔtxʷ

=== Travel ===
Historically, waterways via canoes were the primary means of travel. Shovel-nosed canoes were used for upriver travel, and deep-water canoes were used for downriver and saltwater travel. Canoes were poled going upriver. Canoes were used commonly until late into the 1800s.

Overland routes generally followed the waterways. There was one overland route used by the Skykomish to cross the mountains at Cady Pass, which they shared with the Wenatchi. This relationship was highly profitable for the Skykomish, as through trade with the Wenatchi, they obtained tobacco other rare goods, in return for rare goods from the Puget Sound such as dentalium and dog wool.

=== Housing ===
In traditional Skykomish culture, several kinds of houses were built. The largest longhouses, often called potlatch houses, were centers of religion, learning, culture, governance, and the eponymous potlatch. The owners of a potlatch house often invited people from all over to take part in the potlatch, a gift-giving ceremony which was a crucial part of social life and the traditional Coast Salish economy. These longhouses also hosted elaborate religious ceremonies throughout the winter months. In Skykomish territory, these houses were built in the villages at Gold Bar and Index. At Index, a massive longhouse housed upwards of 240 people.

Summer houses were also built. They were temporary structures which were used during seasonal travel to various hunting, fishing, and gathering spots.

=== Seasonal patterns ===
Traditional Skykomish life revolved around a yearly cycle of hunting, gathering, and fishing. People traveled all over Skykomish territory and beyond to facilitate this lifestyle. In the spring and summer, people traveled out to the Puget Sound and deep into the mountains to gather berries, roots, and clams, as well as fishing and hunting in the lowlands of the Sound. Around August, Skykomish activity in the Puget Sound would die down as they would travel back home to the Sultan Basin to go elk hunting and focus on the salmon runs. Hunting and fishing in Skykomish territory intensified in the early fall as travelers spread out into the Pilchuck, Skykomish, and Sultan basins to hunt deer, elk, bear, and other game. The late fall was prime goat hunting time, and many traveled to x̌əx̌aʔusalʔtxʷ to hunt high in the mountains. In the winter, people returned to their respective villages for feasting and ceremonies. The cold winter months, when not engaging in religious ceremonies, were often spent building canoes, houses, and all other crafts. As the winter drew to a close, many Skykomish would fish for steelhead in the Pilchuck River (Lushootseed: dxʷkʷiƛ̕əb) and begin preparing for the summer activities.

=== Subsistence ===
The Skykomish traditionally relied on a diet similar to other peoples on the western slopes of the Cascades. This consisted of plant life (sand rush, salmonberries, strawberries, blackberries, blackcaps, salalberries, huckleberries, blueberries, blue elderberries, hazelnuts) and animal (deer, elk, mountain goat, salmon, clams, and cockles).

Fish was by far the most important food resource in a traditional Skykomish diet. Most fish caught were smoked or dried, but some were eaten fresh or traded for other goods, especially during the colonial period. Even today, many rely on fishing as supplemental income, or even as primary income. Traditionally, the most common method of fishing was with weirs. Large weirs were built at many of the villages below Gold Bar. Other techniques included spearfishing and gillnetting.

The Skykomish also historically heavily relied on hunting. The primary animals hunted were deer, elk, bear, and mountain goat. There were 3 main areas used for hunting: the Pilchuck Basin, the Sultan Basin, and the Index area. The most prominent elk hunting spot in Skykomish territory was the Sultan Basin. People traveled from all over Skykomish territory to hunt elk in the basin. The Index area was most popular for hunting mountain goat, but deer and bear were hunted in the hills as well. The Pilchuck Basin was shared between the Snoqualmie and Snohomish and was a popular hunting area for deer and bear, as well as elk. Animal resources were used for food as well as clothing, tools, trade goods, and more. Goat wool in particular was a highly valuable trade good, prized by Puget Sound peoples with limited access to the mountains. Another use for goats were caps, made from mountain goat heads, with the horns and ears still attached.

Berries, roots, and other plants were another prolific resource in the Skykomish subsistence economy. Women were the primary berry-gatherers. Berries were mainly gathered downstream, along the river or in prairies. Mountain berries were gathered and sold fresh to settlers at lower elevation, or made into dried cakes for storage. Beargrass was collected to make baskets.

== Language ==
The traditional language of the Skykomish is Lushootseed, an endangered Coast Salish language. Lushootseed has two primary dialects, Northern and Southern. It is debated among anthropologists and historians which dialect the Skykomish traditionally spoke. Ethnologist Colin Tweddell believed the Skykomish spoke a subdialect of Northern Lushootseed, along with the Snohomish. In 1852, Indian Agent E. A. Starling reported that the Skykomish spoke the same dialect as the Snohomish. However, in the same year, the Indian Claims Commission concluded that the Skykomish spoke Southern Lushootseed, as do the Snoqualmie.

Although usage in Lushootseed has declined in recent years with the death of the last native speakers, both successor tribes of the Skykomish, the Tulalip and the Snoqualmie, have language programs and are working towards revitalizing the Lushootseed language. Primary focuses include increasing awareness of the language, preserving and passing on traditional cultural knowledge (known as x̌əč̓usadad in Lushootseed) and restoring daily usage of the language. Both departments have many language learning resources on their websites, and language classes are offered as well.
