= Sauk-Suiattle Indian Tribe =

Federally recognized Indian Tribe in Washington (state)

Sauk-Suiattle Indian Tribe saʔqʷəbixʷ-suyaƛ̕bixʷ
- Location of the Sauk Suiattle Indian Tribe
- Headquarters: Darrington, Washington
- Languages: Lushootseed, English
- Religion: Christianity (incl. syncretic forms); Indigenous folk religion
- Demonym: Sauk-Suiattle
- Enrolled citizens: 314-350 (Note: "314 tribal members and counting." In other parts of the website, the figure is said to be "over 350 individuals.")
- Government: Tribal Council
  - Chairperson: Nino Maltos
  - Vice Chair: Nino Maltos Sr.

Domestic dependent nation within the United States
  - Treaty: 1855
  - Formed: 1946
  - Recognized: September 17, 1975
- Website sauk-suiattle.com

The Sauk-Suiattle Indian Tribe (Lushootseed: saʔqʷəbixʷ-suyaƛ̕bixʷ), commonly known as the Sauk-Suiattle Tribe, is a federally recognized tribe of Sauk people located in western Washington state. Historically, the tribe lived along the banks of the Sauk, Suiattle, Cascade, Stillaguamish, and Skagit rivers, in the area known as Sauk Prairie at the foot of Whitehorse Mountain in the North Cascade Range.

== Name ==
The name Sauk-Suiattle is a combination of the names for two rivers and two groups of people. The Sauk, or Sah-ku-méhu, are the ethnic group who make up the majority of the population of the tribe today, while Suiattle (Lushootseed: suyaƛ̕bixʷ, lit. 'fetching-water people') is a term used by the Sauk for people who traveled to the Suiattle River during the summer and is not an ethnic identifier. However, due to the closeness of the two groups, they are commonly known together as the "Sauk-Suiattle."

The name for the Sauk-Suiattle in Lushootseed is saʔqʷəbixʷ-suyaƛ̕bixʷ. The first part of the name, saʔqʷəbixʷ (also spelled saʔkʷbixʷ or saʔkʷəbixʷ) was recorded on the Treaty of Point Elliott as "Sah-ku-méhu" or "Sah-ku-me-hu." The Sauk were also recorded as the Sabbu-uqu.

== History ==
For generations, the Sauk (Lushootseed: saʔqʷəbixʷ (Note: Also spelled saʔkʷbixʷ or saʔkʷəbixʷ)) lived in the Sauk River valley, fishing, hunting, and gathering along the waterways of the Sauk, Suiattle, Cascade, Skagit, and Stillaguamish rivers. The people traveled to Puget Sound and across the mountains as well, using horses and canoes for travel.

=== 19th century ===
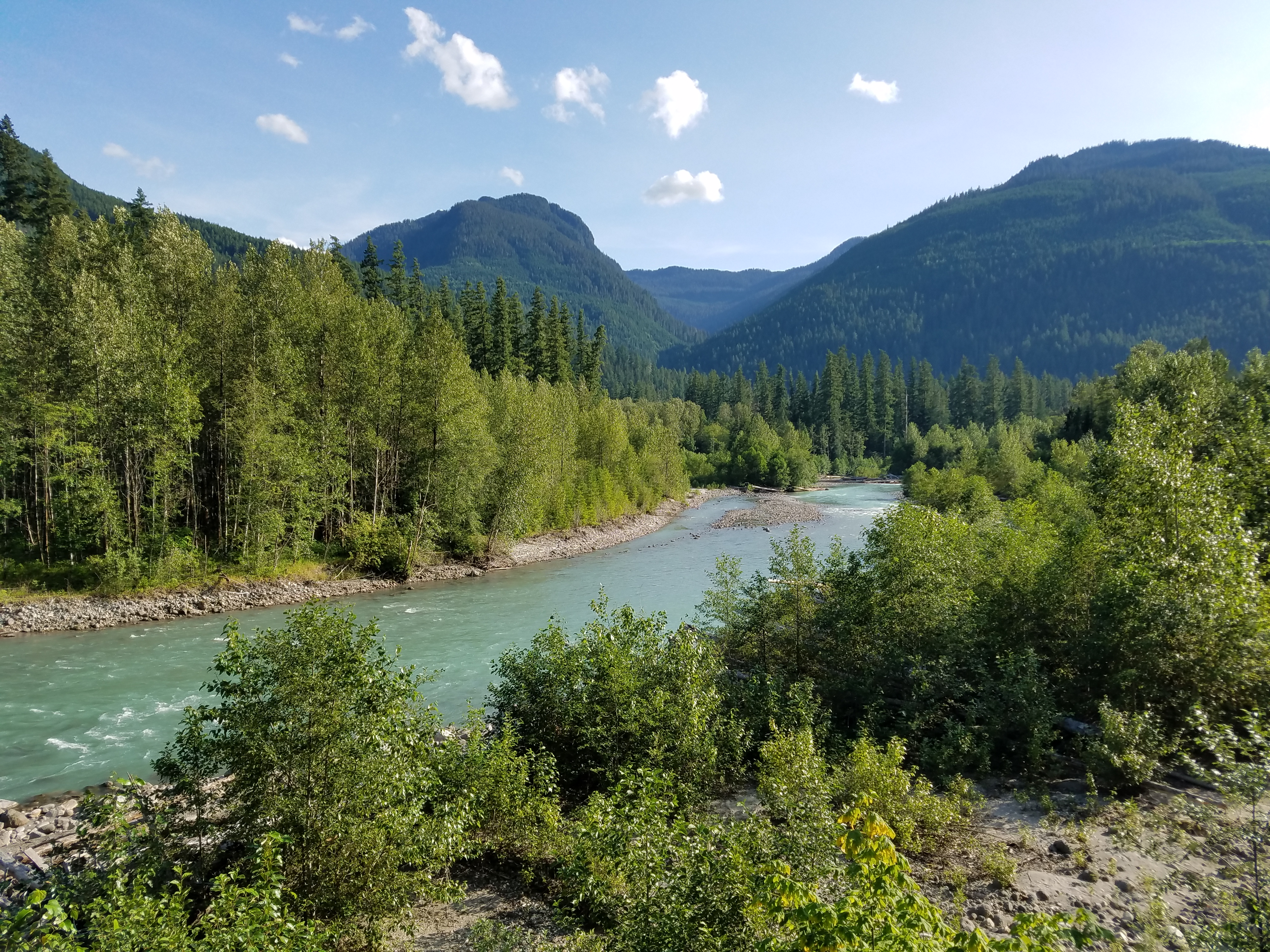
The Suiattle River near the Sauk-Suiattle Reservation

In 1855, the aboriginal Sauk people were party to the Treaty of Point Elliot at what is now Mukilteo, Washington. The Sauk were listed on the treaty as the Sah-ku-mehu (spelled also Sah-ku-me-hu). The man appointed as "chief," Wawsitkin, refused to sign the treaty, because he feared they would not receive a reservation. Thus, Dahtldemin, an appointed "sub-chief," was the signatory for the Sah-ku-me-hu.

The Sauk had an important village at Sauk Prairie, near the confluence of the Sauk and Suiattle rivers, (Note: Alternatively, it has been claimed that the village in question was located at the confluence of the Skagit and Sauk rivers.) which had eight longhouses. This village was destroyed in the 1880s by American settlers claiming land under the Homestead Act of 1862. Due to this encroachment by settlers, many were forced to move to local reservations such as the Swinomish Reservation.

=== 20th century ===
The Sauk continued to seek reparations from the United States government, and in 1936, sued in the Indian Claims Commission. Their case was dismissed as the commission found that they were not a distinct tribal entity, separate from the Upper Skagit Indian Tribe (with whom they were currently affiliated). They were included in the Upper Skagit claim, which was allowed.

In 1946, the Sauk separated from the Upper Skagit, forming their own government and seeking federal recognition as a sovereign nation. They received this on September 17, 1975. They also received a reservation in 1984, which, as of 2008, was 84 acres.

== Government ==
In 1946, the Sauk-Suiattle separated from the Upper Skagit and wrote a constitution and bylaws. The Sauk-Suiattle Tribe achieved federal recognition on September 17, 1975. Their constitution and bylaws were approved by the Secretary of the Interior on the same day.

The Sauk-Suiattle Tribe is governed by the seven-member Sauk-Suiattle Tribal Council. The current (Note: As of February 2025) membership of the tribal council is as follows.

- Chairperson: Nino Maltos
- Vice chair: Nino Maltos Sr.
- Secretary: Natalie Misanses
- Treasurer: Demi Maltos
- Councilperson: Karen Misanes
- Councilperson: Cammie Carrigan
- Councilperson: Alen Price

== Sauk-Suiattle Indian Reservation ==
The Sauk-Suiattle Indian Reservation is an Indian reservation belonging to the Sauk-Suiattle Indian Tribe, located in western Washington state. Established on July 9, 1984, the reservation was originally 15 acres. By 2008, the reservation had grown to 84 acres. Of these, 23 acres are in trust, while the rest is in the process of gaining trust status.

The tribe also holds additional lands in trust jointly with the Upper Skagit Indian Tribe, and individual citizens own public-domain allotments.

The reservation is located near the present-day town of Darrington. It lies in two non-contiguous sections: the largest (48°19′16″N 121°32′59″W) is in southern Skagit County, comprising 33.5 acres (13.6 hectares), or 73.5 percent of the reservation's total land area and all of its resident population of 45 persons (2000 census); the smaller section (48°17′25″N 121°32′36″W), in northern Snohomish County, has a land area of 12.1 acres (4.9 hectares) and no resident population.

== Economy and services ==
The tribe operates several services, including education, medical, housing, and natural resources services. The Health and Social Services department of the tribe operates a community clinic in Darrington. The department provides health care, social services, drug and alcohol prevention, rehabilitation, and counseling. The tribe also operates a preschool and daycare on the reservation, where they offer nutrition, language, wellness, and family services. In 2004, the Sauk-Suiattle became the first tribe in Washington to receive a tribal Wi-Fi hotspot and high-speed wireless.

The tribe operates a smokeshop and a country store through its economic development group. It opened a casino and bingo hall located on Washington State Route 530 in September 2018 It closed less than a year later. In early 2021, they opened a cannabis store.

The tribe has a police department (with six members on the force) and natural resources enforcement (nine members).

Under the Point Elliot Treaty, the Sauk-Suiattle has fishing rights on the rivers. They are a member of the Skagit River System Cooperative together with the Swinomish.

== Demographics ==
Around 1855, the Sauk-Suiattle were estimated to be around 4,000. By 1924, their population had decreased to 18. In 1985, their population was 260, and by 2008, it was 233. As of 2024, the Sauk-Suiattle Indian Tribe has at least 314 citizens, with some estimates going as high as 350.

The tribe sets the requirements for citizenship. Individuals seeking to enroll must have at least 1/4 Indian blood and proof of descendancy from one or more Native American ancestors recorded in the 1942 federal census as living in the Sauk River valley.

== Culture ==
The tribe celebrates an annual August powwow in Darrington, Washington. It also holds traditional stickgames at the same time.

=== Language ===
The language of the Sauk-Suiattle is Lushootseed, a Coast Salish language historically spoken by a number of peoples from roughly modern-day Bellingham to Olympia. The last fluent speaker of the Lushootseed language within the Sauk-Suiattle community, Katherine Brown Joseph, died in 2007.

== See also ==
- Upper Skagit Indian Tribe
- Lushootseed
- List of Lushootseed-speaking peoples
