= Sahewamish =

Regions with significant populations
- United States (Washington)

Languages
- English, Lushootseed

Related ethnic groups
- other Salishan Twana peoples

The Sahewamish are a Northwest Native American tribe of Lushootseed-speaking Coast Salish people. They were fisherman and hunter-gatherers, sedentary, and lived in the southwestern inlets of Puget Sound from Shelton, Washington, to the Nisqually River. There were about six villages.

While some descendants of the tribe live on the Nisqually Reservation near Olympia, others live on the Squaxin Island Tribe reservation near Shelton.

== History ==
- 1787 Strait of Juan de Fuca
- 1788 Area visited by John Meares
- 1790 Both shores of strait explored by Manuel Quimper
- 1792 Area charted by Captain George Vancouver
- 1827 Hudson's Bay Company founded Fort Langley
- 1841 Influx of Oregon Trail settlers begin and conflicts develop
- 1854 Treaty of Medicine Creek

== Language ==
In 1990, there were about 60 older adult speakers of the Sahewamish dialect, of the Salishan Lushootseed language.
