= Lushootseed =

Salishan language or dialect continuum of North America

- dxʷləšucid, txʷəlšucid, xʷəlšucid
- Native to: United States
- Region: North Western Washington, around the Puget Sound
- Ethnicity: Lushootseed-speaking peoples
- Extinct: 2008, with the death of Vi Hilbert (taqʷšəblu)
- Revival: 472 L2 speakers (2022)
- Language family: Salishan: Coast Salish; Central; Lushootseed
- Dialects: Northern Lushootseed; Southern Lushootseed
- Writing system: Latin (Americanist phonetic notation)

Language codes
- ISO 639-3: lut – inclusive code Individual codes: slh – Southern Lushootseed ska – Skagit sno – Snohomish
- Glottolog: lush1251
- ELP: Lushootseed
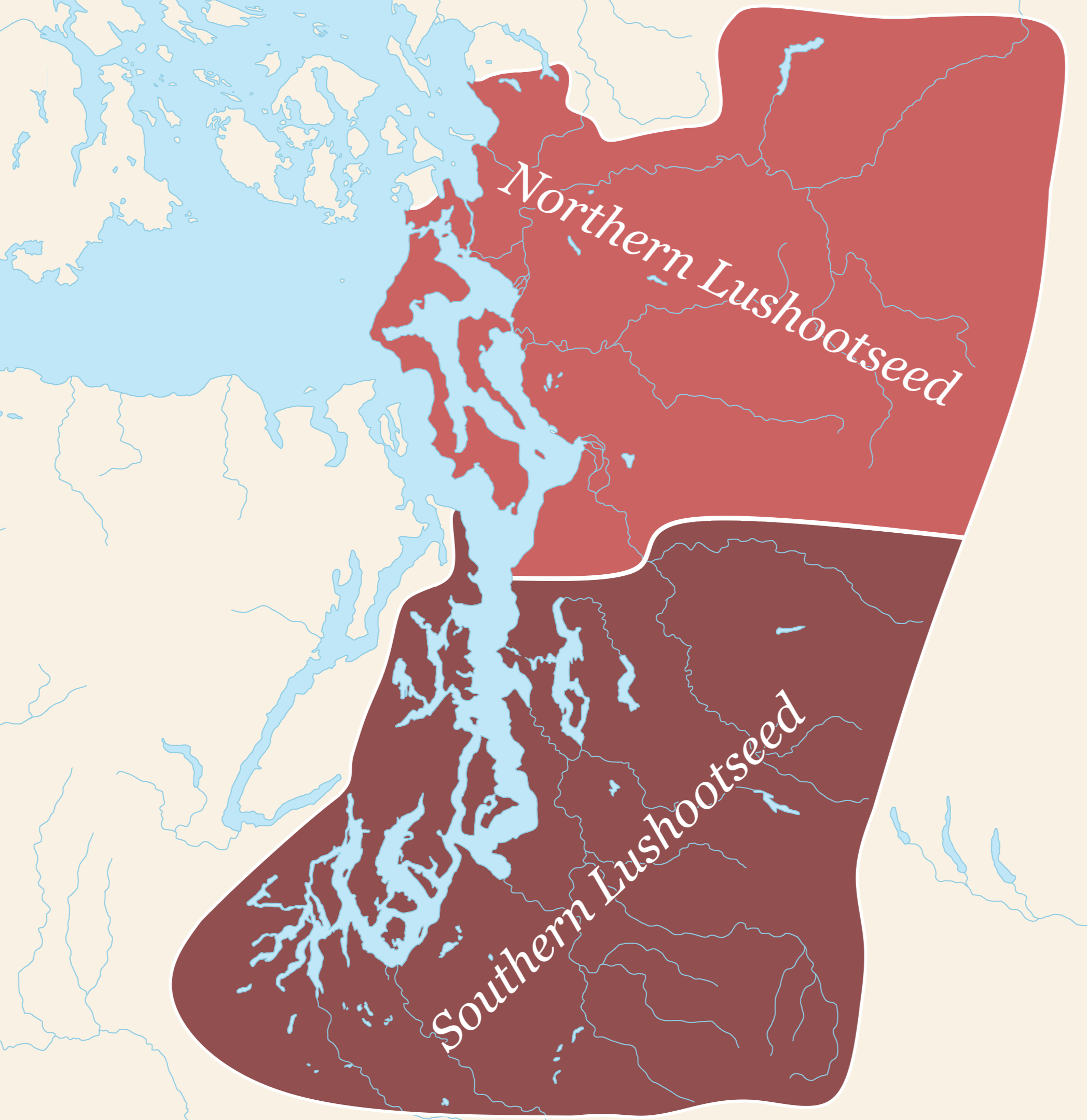
- Historical extent of Lushootseed dialects

- Lushootseed is classified as Critically Endangered by the UNESCO Atlas of the World's Languages in Danger.

Lushootseed (/ləˈʃuːtsiːd/ lə-SHOOT-seed), (Note: Northern Lushootseed: dxʷləšucid Southern Lushootseed: txʷəlšucid Muckleshoot and Snoqualmie dialects: xʷəlšucid) historically known as Puget Salish, Puget Sound Salish, or Skagit-Nisqually, is a Central Coast Salish language of the Salishan language family. Lushootseed is the general name for the dialect continuum composed of two main dialects, Northern Lushootseed and Southern Lushootseed, which are further separated into smaller sub-dialects.

Lushootseed was historically spoken across southern and western Puget Sound roughly between modern-day Bellingham and Olympia by a number of Indigenous peoples. Lushootseed speakers were estimated to number 12,000 at the peak.

Today, however, it is primarily a ceremonial language, spoken for heritage or symbolic purposes. There are about 472 known second-language speakers of Lushootseed. It is classified as Critically Endangered by the UNESCO Atlas of the World's Languages in Danger and classified as Reawakening by Ethnologue.

Many Lushootseed-speaking tribes are attempting to revitalize the daily use of their language. Several language programs and classes are offered across the region.

== Name ==
Lushootseed has been historically known as Niskwalli/Nisqually, Puget Sound Salish, Puget Salish, Pugué, Squaxon, Skagit, and Skagit-Nisqually.

The name of the language in Lushootseed is pronounced (and spelled) variably across different dialects. In the northern dialects, the language is called dxʷləšucid. In most southern dialects, it is txʷəlšucid, whereas in the Muckleshoot and Snoqualmie dialect, it is pronounced xʷəlšucid. The southern pronunciation txʷəlšucid is derived from the original by de-voicing d into t and switching the position of l and ə.

The English name Lushootseed is derived from dxʷləšucid. The prefix dxʷ- along with the suffix -ucid means 'language'. The root word, ləš, is an archaic word for the Puget Sound region. Some scholars, such as Wayne Suttles, believe it may be an old word for 'people', possibly related to the word Salish.

== Classification and current status ==
Lushootseed, like its neighbors Twana, Nooksack, Klallam, and the North Straits Salish languages, are in the Central Coast Salish subgroup of the Salishan family of languages. The language is spoken by many peoples in the Puget Sound region, including the Duwamish, Suquamish, Squaxin, Muckleshoot, Snoqualmie, Nisqually, and Puyallup in the south and the Snohomish, Stillaguamish, Upper Skagit, and Swinomish in the north.

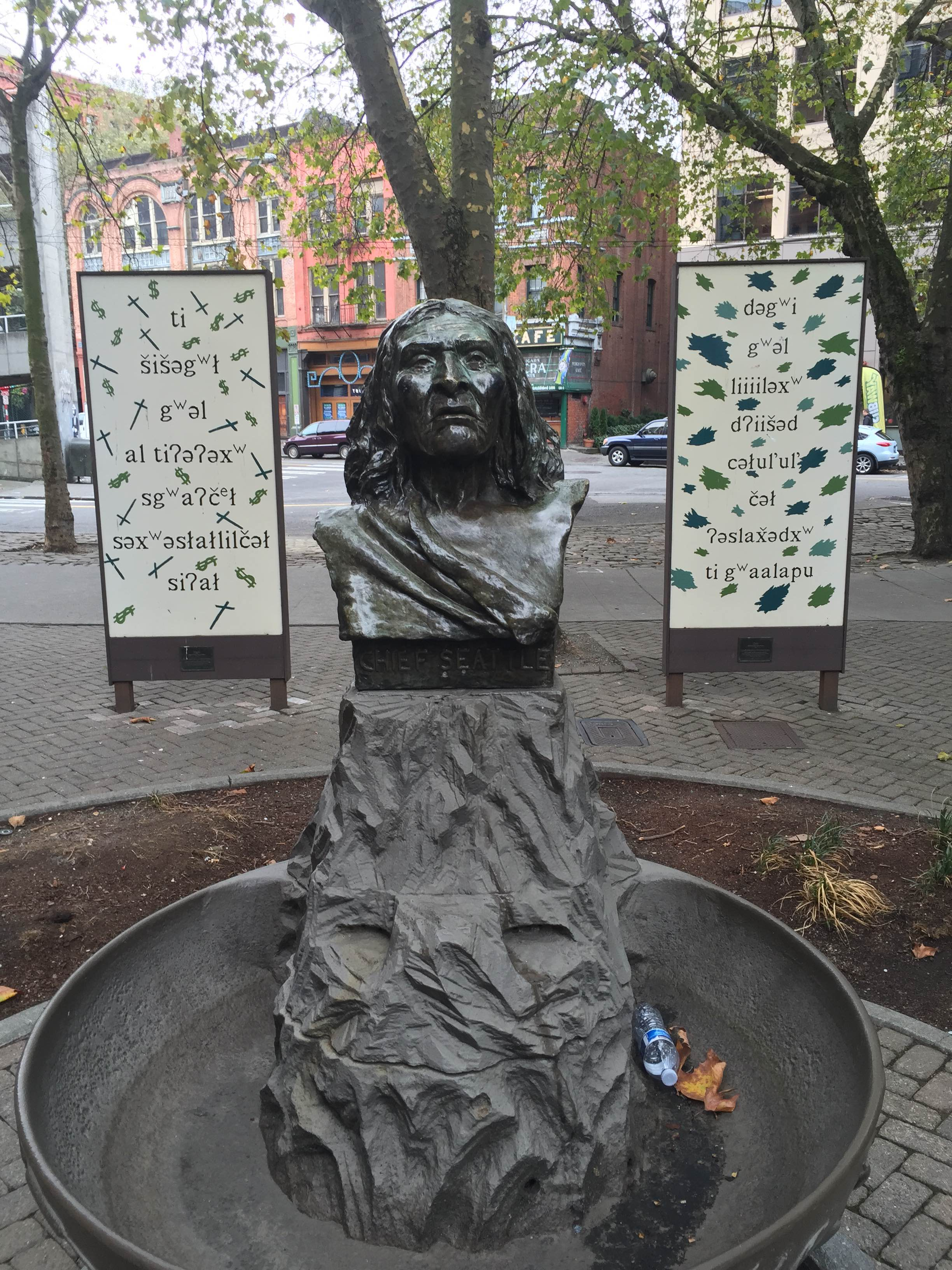
Bust of Chief Seattle with accompanying text in Lushootseed: ti šišəgʷł gʷəl al tiʔəʔəxʷ sgʷaʔčəł səxʷəsłałlilčəł siʔał dəgʷi gʷəl liiiiləxʷ dʔiišəd cəłul̕ul̕ cəł ʔəslax̌ədxʷ ti gʷaalapu

Ethnologue quotes a source published in 1990 (and therefore presumably reflecting the situation in the late 1980s), according to which there were 60 fluent speakers of Lushootseed, evenly divided between the northern and southern dialects. On the other hand, the Ethnologue list of United States languages also lists, alongside Lushootseed's 60 speakers, 100 speakers for Skagit, 107 for Southern Puget Sound Salish, and 10 for Snohomish (a dialect on the boundary between the northern and southern varieties). Some sources given for these figures, however, go back to the 1970s when the language was less critically endangered. Linguist Marianne Mithun has collected more recent data on the number of speakers of various Native American languages, and could document that by the end of the 1990s there were only a handful of elders left who spoke Lushootseed fluently. The language was extensively documented and studied by linguists with the aid of tribal elder Vi Hilbert, d. 2008, who was the last speaker with a full native command of Lushootseed. There are efforts at reviving the language, and instructional materials have been published.

In 2014, there were only five second-language speakers of Lushootseed. As of 2022, although there were not yet native speakers, there were approximately 472 second-language Lushootseed speakers, according to data collected by the Puyallup Tribe. By their definition, a "speaker" includes anyone who speaks in Lushootseed for at least an hour each day.

== Revitalization ==
As of 2013, the Tulalip Tribes' Lushootseed Language Department teaches classes in Lushootseed, and its website has Lushootseed phrases with audio. The Tulalip Montessori School also teaches Lushootseed to young children. Tulalip Lushootseed language teachers also teach at the Tulalip Early Learning Academy, Quil Ceda-Tulalip Elementary in the Marysville School District, Totem Middle School, and Marysville-Getchell, Marysville-Pilchuck and Heritage High Schools. Since 1996, the Tulalip Lushootseed Department has hosted the annual dxʷləšucid sʔəsqaləkʷ ʔə ti wiw̓suʔ, a summer language camp for children. Teachers also offer family classes in the evening every year, making Lushootseed a family experience.

Wa He Lut Indian School teaches Lushootseed to Native elementary school children in their Native Language and Culture program.

As of 2013, an annual Lushootseed conference is held at Seattle University. A course in Lushootseed language and literature has been offered at Evergreen State College. Lushootseed has also been used as a part of environmental history courses at Pacific Lutheran University. It has been spoken during the annual Tribal Canoe Journeys that takes place throughout the Salish Sea.

There are also efforts within the Puyallup Tribe. Their website and social media, aimed at anyone interested in learning the language, are updated often.

To facilitate the use of Lushootseed in electronic files, in 2008 the Tulalip Tribes contracted type designer Juliet Shen to create Unicode-compliant typefaces that met the needs of the language. Drawing upon traditional Lushootseed carvings and artwork, she developed two typefaces: Lushootseed School and Lushootseed Sulad. The Nisqually tribe contracted the Language Conservancy to make a Lushootseed Keyboard for mobile devices.

The University of Washington has long been involved in Lushootseed research and teaching. Lushootseed was first taught on the Seattle campus in 1972 by Thom Hess, a linguistics professor, and the following year he turned over the class to Vi Hilbert, who would be the last native speaker. From 1973 to 1988, Vi Hilbert taught Lushootseed on the Seattle campus. Hess and Hilbert published a Lushootseed dictionary and readers in the 1990s. In the summers of 2016 and 2017, an adult immersion program in Lushootseed was offered at the University of Washington's Tacoma campus. It was sponsored by The Puyallup Tribal Language Program in partnership with University of Washington Tacoma and its School of Interdisciplinary Arts and Sciences. Southern Lushootseed classes started in 2018 on the University of Washington's Seattle campus, taught by Tami Hohn, a Puyallup tribal member.

== Dialects ==
Lushootseed consists of two main dialect groups, Northern Lushootseed (dxʷləšucid) and Southern Lushootseed (txʷəlšucid~xʷəlšucid). Both of these dialects can then be broken down into subdialects:

- Northern Lushootseed
  - (Upper) Skagit
    - Lower Skagit (Swinomish)
  - Sauk
  - Snohomish (Tulalip)
- Southern Lushootseed
  - Skykomish
  - Snoqualmie
  - Suquamish
  - Duwamish
  - Muckleshoot
  - Puyallup
  - Nisqually
  - Squaxin/Sahewamish

The Lower and Upper Skagit dialects have variously been categorized as being different from one another, or one and the same, but are both recognized as being distinct from the Sauk dialect. There is no consensus on whether the Skykomish dialect should be grouped into Northern or Southern Lushootseed.

Dialects differ in several ways. Pronunciation between dialects is different. In Northern dialects, the stress of the word generally falls on the first non-schwa of the root, whereas in the Southern dialects, stress usually is placed on the penultimate syllable. Some words do not fit the pattern, but generally, pronunciation is consistent in those ways. Northern Lushootseed also was affected by progressive dissimilation targeting palatal fricatives and affricates, whereas Southern Lushootseed was not, leading to some words like čəgʷəš ("wife") being pronounced čəgʷas in Northern dialects.

Differences in stress in Northern and Southern Lushootseed. (Stress is marked with an acute accent.)
Northern Lushootseed	Southern Lushootseed	English
bədáʔ	bə́dəʔ	child
sc̓əlíč	sc̓ə́lič	backbone
č̓ƛ̕áʔ	č̓ə́ƛ̕əʔ	rock
dəč̓úʔ	də́čuʔ	one
k̓ədáyu	k̓ádəyu	rat
kʷədád	kʷə́dəd	take/hold something
təyíl	táyil	go upstream
ʔəcá	ʔə́cə	I, me

Different dialects often use completely different words. For example, the word for "raccoon" is x̌aʔx̌əlus in Northern Lushootseed, whereas bəlups is used in Southern Lushootseed.

Morphology also differs between Northern and Southern Lushootseed. Northern Lushootseed and Southern Lushootseed have related, but different determiner systems. There are also several differences in utilizing the prefix for marking "place where" or "reason for," in subordinate clauses, with Northern Lushootseed using dəxʷ- and Southern Lushootseed using sxʷ-.

See Determiners for more information on this dialectical variation.

== Phonology ==
Lushootseed has a complex consonantal phonology and 4 vowel phonemes. Along with more common voicing and labialization contrasts, Lushootseed has a plain-glottalic contrast, which is realized as laryngealized with sonorants, and ejective with voiceless stops or fricatives.

=== Consonants ===
Lushootseed consonants
		Labial	Alveolar		Palatal (-alveolar)	Velar		Uvular		Glottal
		Labial	plain	sibilant	Palatal (-alveolar)	plain	lab.	plain	lab.	Glottal
Stop	voiced	b	d	dz	dʒ	ɡ	ɡʷ			
Stop	voiceless	p	t	ts	tʃ	k	kʷ	q	qʷ	ʔ
Stop	ejective	pʼ	tʼ	tsʼ	tʃʼ	kʼ	kʷʼ	qʼ	qʷʼ	
Stop	lateral ejective		tɬʼ							
Fricative			ɬ	s	ʃ		xʷ	χ	χʷ	h
Approximant	plain		l		j		w			
Approximant	laryngealized		l̰		j̰		w̰			

Lushootseed has no phonemic nasals. However, the nasals [m], [m̰], [n], and [n̰] may appear in some speech styles and words as variants of /b/ and /d/.

=== Vowels ===
Lushootseed vowels
	Front	Central	Back
High	i ~ e		u ~ o
Mid	i ~ e	ə	u ~ o
Low	æ ~ ɑ		

== Orthography ==
According to work published by Vi Hilbert and other Lushootseed-language specialists, Lushootseed uses a morphophonemic writing system meaning that it is a phonemic alphabet which does not change to reflect the pronunciation such as when an affix is introduced. The chart below is based on the Lushootseed Dictionary. Typographic variations such as ⟨c'⟩ and ⟨cʼ⟩ do not indicate phonemic distinctions. Capital letters are not used in Lushootseed.

Some older works based on the Dictionary of Puget Salish distinguishes between schwas that are part of the root word and those inserted through agglutination which are written in superscript.

The Tulalip Tribes of Washington's Lushootseed Language Department created a display with nearly all the letters in the Lushootseed alphabet, except the letter b̓, which is a rare sound which no words begin with.

Letter	Letter Name	IPA	Notes
ʔ	Glottal stop	/ʔ/	
a		/ɑ/	
b		/b/	
b̓	Glottalized b	/bˀ/	Rare, non-initial. Voiced bilabial stop with glottalized stricture
c		/t͡s/	
c̓	Glottalized c	/t͡sʼ/	
č	c-wedge	/t͡ʃ/	
č̓	Glottalized c-wedge	/t͡ʃʼ/	
d		/d/	
dᶻ	d-raised-z	/d͡z/	
e		/e/	
ə	Schwa	/ə/	
g		/ɡ/	
gʷ	g-raised-w	/ɡʷ/	Labialized counterpart of /ɡ/
h		/h/	
i		/i~e/	Pronounced either as in the English "bee" or "bay."
ǰ	j-wedge	/d͡ʒ/	
k		/k/	
k̓	Glottalized k	/kʼ/	
kʷ	k-raised-w	/kʷ/	Labialized counterpart of /k/
k̓ʷ	Glottalized k-raised-w	/kʷʼ/	Labialized counterpart of /kʼ/
l		/l/	
l̓	Glottalized/Strictured l	/l̰/	
ɫ/ɬ/ł	Barred/Belted l	/ɬ/	Though they represent the same sound, all three variations of the letter are seen.
ƛ̓	Glottalized barred-lambda	/t͜ɬʼ/	
m		/m/	Rare due to phonetic evolution.
m̓	Glottalized/Strictured m	/m̰/	Rare due to phonetic evolution. Laryngealized bilabial nasal
n		/n/	Rare due to phonetic evolution
n̓	Glottalized/Strictured n	/n̰/	Rare due to phonetic evolution. Laryngealized alveolar nasal
o		/o/	
p		/p/	
p̓	Glottalized p	/pʼ/	
q		/q/	
q̓	Glottalized q	/qʼ/	
qʷ	q-raised-w	/qʷ/	Labialized counterpart of /q/
q̓ʷ	Glottalized q-raised-w	/qʷʼ/	Labialized counterpart of /qʼ/
s		/s/	
š	s-wedge	/ʃ/	
t		/t/	
t̓	Glottalized t	/tʼ/	
u		/u~o/	Pronounced either as in the English "boot" or "boat."
w		/w~ʋ/	
w̓	Glottalized/Strictured w	/w̰/	Laryngealized high back rounded glide
x		/x/	
xʷ	x-w/x-raised-w	/xʷ/	Labialized counterpart of /x/
x̌	x-wedge	/χ/	
x̌ʷ	Rounded x-wedge	/χʷ/	Labialized counterpart of /χ/
y		/j/	
y̓	Glottalized/Strictured y	/j̰/	Laryngealized high front unrounded glide

See the external links below for resources.

== Morphology and verbs ==
=== Verb prefixes ===
Almost all instances of a verb in Lushootseed (excluding the zero copula) carry a prefix indicating their tense and/or aspect. Below is a (non-exhaustive) list of these prefixes, along with their meanings and applications.

Prefix	Usage
ʔəs-	Imperfective present
lə-	Imperfective present
ʔu-	Completed telic actions
tu-	Past
ɬu-	Future
ƛ̕u-	Habitual
gʷ(ə)-	Subjunctive/future

The prefix ʔəs- is one of the most common. It indicates an imperfective aspect-present tense (similar to English '-ing') for verbs that do not involve motion. More specifically, a verb may use ʔəs- if it does not result in a change of position for its subject. It is commonly known as a "state of being":

ʔəsƛ̕ubil čəd. 'I am feeling fine.' or 'I am in good health.'

If a verb does involve motion, the ʔəs- prefix is replaced with lə-:

ləƛ̕a čəd ʔálʔal. 'I'm going home.'

Completed or telic actions use the prefix ʔu-. Most verbs without ʔəs- or lə- will use ʔu-. Some verbs also exhibit a contrast in meaning between lə- and ʔu-, and only one of them is correct:

ʔusaxʷəb čəxʷ. 'You jump(ed).'

The verb saxʷəb literally means 'to jump, leap, or run, especially in a short burst of energy', and is correctly used with ʔu-. In contrast, the verb təlawil, which means 'to jump or run for an extended period of time', is used with lə-:

lətəlawil čəxʷ. 'You are jumping.'

=== Possession ===
There are five possessive affixes, derived from the pronouns:

Possessive Suffixes
	First Person	Second Person	Third Person
Singular	d-	ad-	-s
Plural	-čəɬ	-ləp	(none)

The third person singular -s is considered marginal and does not work with an actual lexical possessor.

== Syntax ==
Lushootseed can be considered a relatively agglutinating language, given its high number of morphemes, including a large number of lexical suffixes. Word order is fairly flexible, although it is generally considered to be verb-subject-object (VSO).

Lushootseed is capable of creating grammatically correct sentences that contain only a verb, with no subject or object. All information beyond the action is to be understood by context. This can be demonstrated in ʔuʔəy'dub '[someone] managed to find [someone/something]'. Sentences which contain no verb at all are also common, as Lushootseed has no copula. An example of such a sentence is stab əw̓ə tiʔiɫ 'What [is] that?'.

Despite its general status as VSO, Lushootseed can be rearranged to be subject-verb-object (SVO) and verb-object-subject (VOS). Doing so does not modify the words themselves, but requires the particle ʔə to mark the change. The exact nature of this particle is the subject of some debate.

Prepositions in Lushootseed are almost entirely handled by one word, ʔal, which can mean 'on, above, in, beside, around' among a number of potential other meanings. They come before the object they reference, much like in English. Examples of this can be found in the following phrases:

1. stab əw̓ə tiʔiɫ ʔal tə stuləkʷ 'What is that in the river?'
2. ʔuyayus ti dbad ʔal tudiʔ 'My father is working over there.'
3. šəqabac ʔal ti piit 'On top of the bed.'

=== Pronouns ===
Lushootseed has four subject pronouns: čəd 'I' (first-person singular), čəɬ 'we' (first-person plural), čəxʷ 'you' (second-person singular), and čələp 'you' (second-person plural). It does not generally refer to the third person in any way.

Pronouns of Lushootseed
	First Person	Second Person	Third Person
Singular	čəd	čəxʷ	∅
Plural	čəɬ	čələp	∅

The subject pronoun always comes in the second position in the sentence:

dxʷləbiʔ čəxʷ ʔu 'Are you Lummi?' xʷiʔ čəd lədxʷləbiʔ 'I am not Lummi.'

Here, negation takes the first position, the subject pronoun takes the second, and 'Lummi' is pushed to the end of the sentence.

=== Negation ===
Negation in Lushootseed takes the form of an adverb xʷiʔ 'no, none, nothing' which always comes at the beginning of the sentence that is to be negated. It is constructed in two possible ways, one for negatives of existence, and one for negatives of identity. If taking the form of a negative of identity, a proclitic lə- must be added to the sentence on the next adverb. If there are no further adverbs in the sentence, the proclitic attaches to the head word of the predicate, as in the sentence xʷiʔ čəxʷ sixʷ ləbakʷɬ 'Don't get hurt again'.

== Vocabulary ==
The Lushootseed language originates from the coastal region of Northwest Washington State and the Southwest coast of Canada. There are words in the Lushootseed language which are related to the environment and the fishing economy that surrounded the Salish tribes. The following tables show different words from different Lushootseed dialects relating to the salmon fishing and coastal economies.

Southern Lushootseed Salmonoid Vocabulary
sčədadx	a word that covers all Pacific salmon and some species of trout.
sac̓əb	Chinook or King
c̓uwad	Sockeye salmon
skʷǝxʷic	coho salmon
ƛ̓xʷay̓	chum salmon
hədu	the pink salmon
skʷawǝl̓	Steelhead
pədkʷəxʷic	coho season
sc̓ay̓ay̓	gills
ɫičaʔa	nets
ɫičaʔalikʷ	net fishing
ʔalil tiʔiɫ ƛ̓usq̓íl	spawning season
skʷǝɫt	tailfin
t̓altəd	fillet knife
sq̓ʷəlus	kippered dried salmon
səlusqid	fish heads
qəlx̌	dried salmon eggs
ƛ̓ǝbƛ̓əbqʷ	fresh eggs
sɫuʔb	dried chum
sxʷudᶻəʔdaliɫəd	fish with a large amount of body fat
xʷšabus	Lightly smoked

Northern Lushootseed/Snohomish Salmonoid Vocabulary
sʔuladxʷ	a word that covers all Pacific salmon and some species of trout.
yubəč	Chinook or King
scəqiʔ	sockeye salmon
ƛ̓xʷayʔ	chum salmon
skʷəxʷic	silver salmon

Northern Lushootseed/Snohomish Aquatic Vocabulary
qal̓qaləx̌ič	orca/killer whale
č(ə)xʷəluʔ	grey whale
sq̓aƛ̓	otter
sup̓qs	harbor seal
st̓əqxʷ	beaver
sqibk̕ʷ	octopus
ʔaləšək	turtle
waq̓waq̓	frog
sk̕ʷic̕i	sea urchin
təǰabac	sea cucumber
q̓ʷəlačiʔ	star fish
bəsqʷ	crab
t̓aɬiɡʷs	rock cod
p̓uay̓	flounder
kəlapx̌ʷəlč	jelly fish
sʔax̌ʷuʔ	clam
tulqʷ	mussel
ƛ̓ux̌ʷƛ̓ux̌ʷ	native oyster
c̕ubc̕ub	barnacle
sx̌aʔaʔ	little neck steam clams
xʷč̓iɬqs	large native oyster
ɡʷidəq	geoduck
stxʷub	butter clam
sx̌əp̓ab	cockle clam
haʔəc	horse clam
č̓ič̓əlpyaqid / puʔps	periwinkle
sč̓awəyʔ	any seashell
ʔuk̕ʷs	large chiton
x̌ald	small chiton

== Sample text ==
Article 1 of the Universal Declaration of Human Rights in Lushootseed:

- ʔəsdiɬdiɬgʷəs ti sdᶻəw̓il ʔi ti staltalx̌ ʔə ti sbək̓ʷaʔkʷbixʷ tul̕ʔal ti sgʷəcs. ʔəstalx̌ əlgʷəʔ kʷi gʷəsx̌əčbids gʷəl ɬutabab ti bək̓ʷaʔkʷbixʷ x̌əɬ ti tə təɬ syəyaʔyaʔ.

Article 1 of the Universal Declaration of Human Rights in English:

- All human beings are born free and equal in dignity and rights. They are endowed with reason and conscience and should act towards one another in a spirit of brotherhood.
