= Snoqualmie people =

Ethnic group in Washington state

Snoqualmie
sdukʷalbixʷ
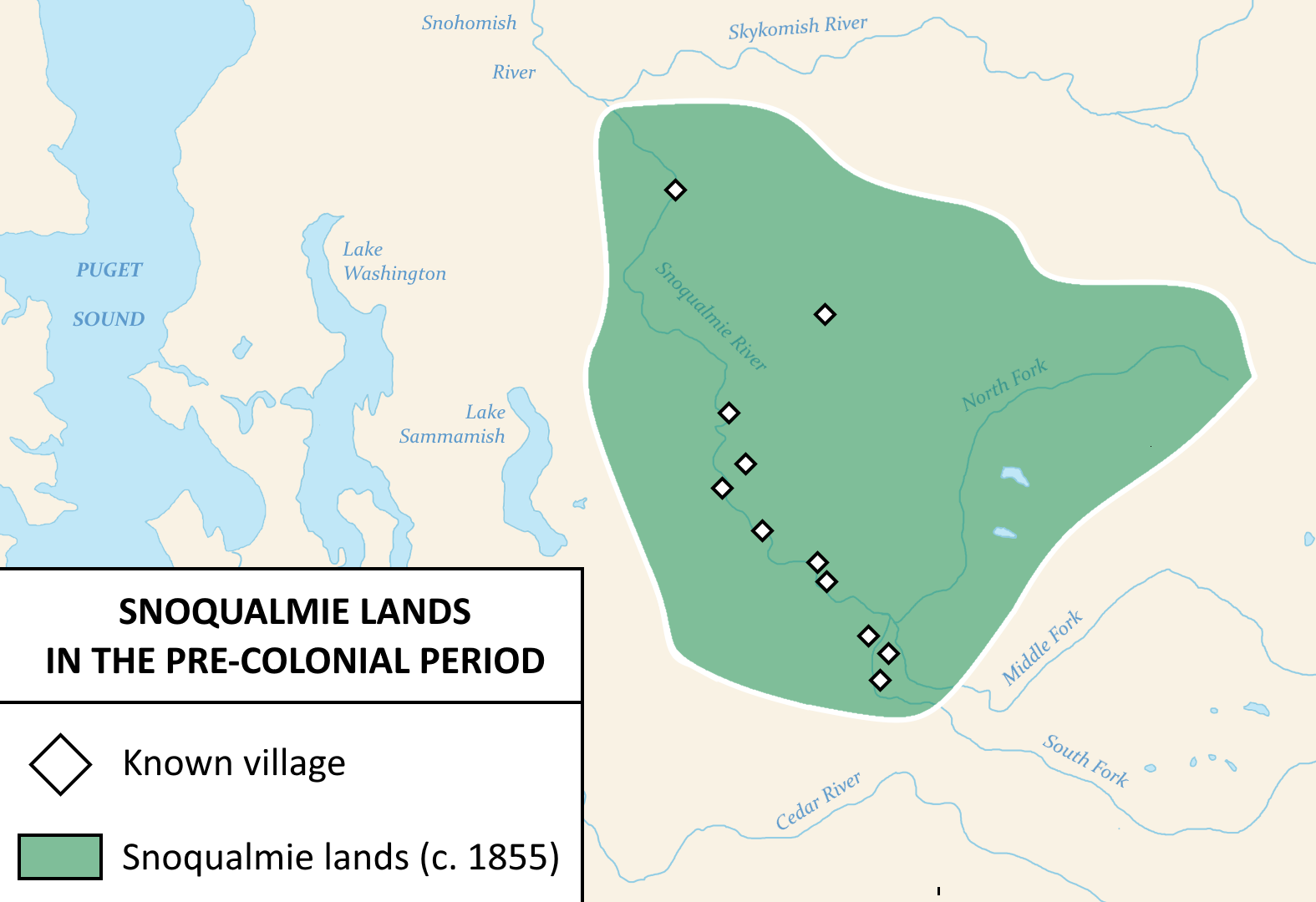
- Snoqualmie lands in the pre-colonial period

Regions with significant populations
- Washington, United States

Languages
- Lushootseed, now also English

Religion
- Traditional religion; Christianity, incl. syncretic forms

Related ethnic groups
- Other Lushootseed-speaking peoples, esp. the Skykomish, Duwamish, and Sammamish

The Snoqualmie people (Lushootseed: sdukʷalbixʷ) are a Lushootseed-speaking Southern Coast Salish people indigenous to the Snoqualmie Valley, located in east King and Snohomish counties in the state of Washington.

Today, they are enrolled in the federally recognized tribes: Snoqualmie Indian Tribe and Tulalip Tribes of Washington.

== Name ==
The name "Snoqualmie" is derived from the Lushootseed endonym of the Snoqualmie: sdukʷalbixʷ. The name is composed of a root, √dukʷ, and the suffix =albixʷ, meaning "people of." The name was traditionally the name for the Snoqualmie River and all related villages located on it, not the name of a united ethnic group as it is today.

The etymology of the root is contested. According to the Snoqualmie Tribe, the name means "people of the moon," with the root √dukʷ referring to dukʷibəɬ, the Changer, and the highest god in traditional Snoqualmie religion. Another possible etymology is that the name means "worthless people," with the homonymic root word √dukʷ meaning "worthless," the name a result of the coast dwelling peoples low opinion of the inland Snoqualmie. It has also been proposed that the root √dukʷ may instead have the connotation of "fearless," resulting in the name meaning "fearless people," which is a more likely meaning than "worthless people," according to linguists Dawn Bates and Thom Hess.

Snoqualmie has also historically been spelled many ways, including Snoqualmu, Snoqualmoo, Snoquelolmi, Snoqualmick, Snoqualamuke, Snoqualmi, and Snuqualmi.

Today, there are many places which carry the Snoqualmie name, including Snoqualmie, Washington, the Snoqualmie River, Snoqualmie Falls, Snoqualmie Pass, and the Snoqualmie Valley.

== History ==
=== Early history ===
Around the beginning of the colonial period in the early 19th century, the Snoqualmie experienced a massive increase in slave raids targeting them from northern peoples. The Snoqualmie began to rapidly expand their own military capabilities. Patkanim, a prominent Snoqualmie leader during the 19th century, began to create several systems to defend the Snoqualmie and centralize his own power. He later led the Snoqualmie on several raids against the U.S. government and for a time was one of the main resistors of U.S. influence in the region.

=== Treaty of Point Elliott ===
In 1855, the Snoqualmie were party to the signing of the Point Elliott Treaty at Muckilteo (Lushootseed: bək̓ʷəɬtiwʔ). Fourteen Snoqualmie men signed the treaty. "Chiefs" and "subchiefs" were arbitrarily assigned to be representative of various tribes and subgroups, which solidified the power of singular men, leaving out other traditional community leaders. Territorial Governor Isaac Stevens' policy was to amalgamate as many independent groups into as few tribes as possible to make the signing of treaties easier. Prior treaties made with other groups in the area had negotiated with each independent village and were signed by all adult men, rather than just a few assigned chiefs.

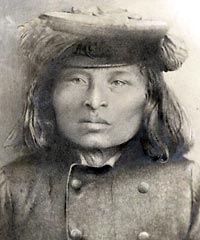
Patkanim, a prominent Snoqualmie leader

Around this time, there had emerged two highly important leaders of the Snoqualmie, Patkanim and Sonowa, who were both recognized at different points as "chiefs" of the Snoqualmie. Patkanim was given representation of all villages downstream of tultxʷ, including the independent Skykomish and Snohomish peoples. Sonowa was given representation of all Snoqualmie villages upstream of tultxʷ. To Indian Agent Michael Simmons at the time, Sonowa was seen as "one of the very best Indians in [the] district," whereas Patkanim was seen as a troublemaker.

The Snoqualmie were originally supposed to be removed from their lands to the coastal Tulalip Reservation, first intended to be a general reservation for all peoples west of the Cascades. A temporary reservation on the then-named Snohomish Bay was to be established solely for the Snohomish, Snoqualmie, Skykomish, and Stillaguamish, as well as their several subgroups. These lands were wholly unsuitable for the Snoqualmie, an inland people. Not only were the Snoqualmie not suited for a saltwater lifestyle, but the treaty commission vastly underestimated the number of people who lived in the area. Early estimates by the commission in 1854 suggested that only 300–400 people lived on the entire Snohomish and Stillaguamish watersheds. By 1856, American estimates reached as high as 1800. On the other hand, the US government would grant the same amount of land intended for 1800 people to just four white settlers (if they were married) under the Donation Land Claim Act. Multiple people, including Sonowa and Agent Simmons, pleaded to the U.S. Government to establish a reservation inland for the Snoqualmie, on the basis that they would not be able to live on the saltwater due to their inland lifestyle.

=== Reservation Era ===
After the signing of the treaty, the Snoqualmie did make an attempt to move to the reservation as indicated in the treaty. Sonowa may have initially left with his people to the Tulalip Reservation, but they ended up back to the Snoqualmie Valley. The Tulalip Reservation did not have enough food or land to support the Snoqualmie in addition to the many other peoples on the reservation, so most returned to their homelands. In 1856 and in 1858, Indian Agents requested multiple times for a reservation to be created near Snoqualmie Falls, however, no reservation was created. Most Snoqualmie could not obtain land at Tulalip either, resulting in the Snoqualmie becoming practically landless.

By 1919, many Snoqualmie still lived in their communities in or near pioneer settlements such as Tolt and Fall City, working in logging camps and saw mills. Indian Agent Charles Roblin reported to the Commissioner of Indian Affairs on the state of the Snoqualmie. Around this time, the Snoqualmie population was around 4,000.

In the 1940s, the Superintendent of the Tulalip Agency again recommended the purchase of a separate reservation for the Snoqualmie.

Eventually, the Snoqualmie Tribe of Indians purchased land for and were granted a Reservation near Snoqualmie, Washington, on which the tribe opened the Snoqualmie Casino in 2008.

== Territory and villages ==
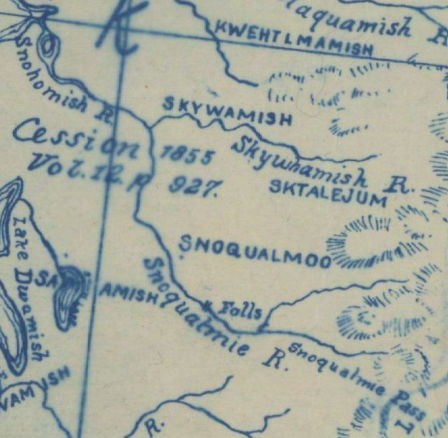
An 1857 map showing the location of the Snoqualmie, here marked as "Snoqualmoo"

The traditional territory of the Snoqualmie consists of the Snoqualmie River watershed, from North Bend downriver to its confluence with the Skykomish. Although it is difficult to determine the exact locations and boundaries, the Snoqualmie also traveled widely throughout the Cascade mountains adjacent to their territory.

According to some historians, the Skykomish were historically a sub-group of the Snoqualmie. However, most experts today agree that, although they were closely allied and intermarried, the Skykomish were completely separate and autonomous from the Snoqualmie.

=== Villages ===
Around the time of the treaty, the Snoqualmie had around 16 villages consisting of at least 58 longhouses, although the exact number of villages is hard to determine. The Snoqualmie built their villages along the Snoqualmie River and its tributaries, primarily at the mouth of the main tributary creeks. Most of the villages were located below Snoqualmie Falls (šəqaʔɬdaɬ) with the largest being located at the mouth of Tokul Creek (dəxʷq̓al), Cherry Creek, Fall City, and Carnation (tultxʷ).

Snoqualmie villages were not united under a single leader. Instead, each village was completely sovereign and autonomous, allied together through shared dialect, kin, and culture. Although some leaders (such as Patkanim) were highly influential and wielded great influence, they traditionally had no actual authority over any other village.

List of known Snoqualmie villages
Name	Anglicization(s)	Location	Notes
st̕apc	Stapts	At the mouth of Cherry Creek	1 longhouse
x̌alalʔtxʷ		Across the Snoqualmie River from Carnation (tultxʷ)	Largest village on the Snoqualmie River; central village of the x̌alalʔtxʷabš
		Stossel Creek	
	Skashia	Griffin Creek, on a prairie	5 longhouses
	Toquiki	Patterson Creek	8 longhouses
	Yetsk	Fall City, on the Raging River	18 longhouses; second-largest village on the Snoqualmie River
	Yahakabulch	Unknown	9 longhouses
	Schwalp	Unknown	4 longhouses
dəxʷq̓al	Tokul, Toquill	Tokul Creek	7 longhouses
sgʷəd	Skwut	Below Snoqualmie Falls (šəqaʔɬdaɬ)	3 longhouses
baqʷab	Bokwab	Snoqualmie Prairie	8 longhouses
	Tswodum	Between the South and Middle Forks of the Snoqualmie River	5 longhouses
səxʷq̓ʷuʔq̓ʷuʔ	Sotsoks	1 mile below North Bend, on the South Fork Snoqualmie River	5 longhouses; common gathering place for winter ceremonies and potlatches

== Culture ==
=== Seasonal patterns ===
Like other Coast Salish peoples, the Snoqualmie were traditionally a complex hunter-gatherer society. They operated on a yearly pattern revolving around the different seasons. In the spring and summer, hunting and gathering was the most common activity. In the fall and early winter, the focus shifted towards fishing.

=== Housing ===
The Snoqualmie traditionally constructed several types of housing. The largest, most important, and most famous building in Snoqualmie culture is the longhouse. A large longhouse could be 120 feet long and support up to 20 families. Each longhouse had a leader and a council made up of the various heads of each family.

The Snoqualmie also constructed temporary structures of several designs. Some temporary mat houses were shaped in a conical design. The Snoqualmie also had a semi-permanent longhouse along Lake Sammamish. The Snoqualmie also sometimes built sweat lodges.

=== Religion ===
Snoqualmie traditional religion, was, like other Coast Salish societies, based on the belief in powerful spirits and powers which were bound to the land. The village at tultxʷ was one of the last locations where the once-prolific Soul Recovery Ceremony was practiced in Puget Sound. The ceremony summoned help from the swaw̓tixʷtəd, a type of small forest spirit who were said to live in a community nearby to the village. The village at what is now Fall City also had resident spirits which made warriors there much stronger.

=== Language ===
The traditional language of the Snoqualmie is Lushootseed, calləd txʷəlšucid in the Snoqualmie dialect. Lushootseed is a Coast Salish language which was historically spoken from what is now Bellingham to the head of Puget Sound at Olympia. Lushootseed is divided into two mutually-intelligible main dialects, Southern Lushootseed (sometimes called Twulshootseed or Whulshootseed) and Northern Lushootseed. Unlike their downriver neighbors, the Snohomish, the Snoqualmie speak a subdialect of Southern Lushootseed similar to the Muckleshoot and Duwamish.

Although usage of Lushootseed has declined in recent years, now mainly restricted to cultural and ceremonial uses, the Snoqualmie Tribe has a language program dedicated to revitalizing the language. The department aims to increase the language's use in daily life, as well as use it in conjunction with teaching the cultural practices of the Snoqualmie people. The website of the Snoqualmie Language Program features many resources available for learning Lushootseed, such as lists of vocabulary, phrases, and links to helpful websites.

Due to their historical closeness with the Sahaptin-speaking Yakama and Wenatchi peoples across the Cascades, some Snoqualmie were bi-lingual in Lushootseed and Sahaptin.

=== Subsistence ===
The Snoqualmie traditionally had a well-rounded diet consisting of many plant and animal resources from the diverse ecosystem of their homelands.

Known to their saltwater-dwelling neighbors as some of the best hunters, the Snoqualmie primarily hunted deer, elk, bear, goat, beaver, grouse, and duck for their meat, pelts, and other resources. Hunting was a large part of the traditional Snoqualmie lifestyle, and hunting trips were frequent and long, lasting upwards of 2–3 weeks. Deer were hunted everywhere, from their homelands in the valley to the islands in the Sound. Elk hunters traveled to the territory of the neighboring Skykomish people. Mountain goats were hunted in the Cascade Mountains. While the best spot in Snoqualmie territory for goat hunting was at the headwaters of the South Fork, people also hunted at the headwaters of the North Fork and at Stampede Pass and Granite Mountain.

Seafood, primarily fish, was another highly important resource of the Snoqualmie. Fisheries were located at every village location up to the falls, as well as other important locations on smaller streams and lakes. There were six common methods of fishing: with spears, with baskets, with gillnets, with traps, with dip nets, and with weirs. The most common fishing method was with large river-spanning weirs which served to control the stream of fish. Dip nets could be easily dropped into the water and raised to gather great amounts of fish. Fish were primarily dried and stored for the winter.

Berries and other plant resources were traditionally gathered by women. Gathering trips consisted of traveling to a creek or other location near the berry grounds, sometimes in tandem with a hunting group, where a camp was set up. Camps often had temporary dwellings, as well as drying and processing racks for the berries, as well as any fish caught or meat gathered from animals during the trip. Berries were collected and brought back to the camp for drying and storage. Berries gathered include huckleberries, blackberries, elderberries, salmonberries, cranberries, and strawberries. Some berries were gathered in the marshes and lakes and prairies of the lowlands. Others were gathered high up on the mountains and in the passes, which were the favored gathering areas of many Snoqualmie women. Slash-and-burn techniques were used to maintain the ecosystem and promote growth.

In the early contact period, the Snoqualmie began growing and harvesting potatoes at the prairies in their territory. Snoqualmie Prairie was one such location, which produced impressive quantities of potatoes.

After the signing of the treaty, many Snoqualmie began to make their living by working in logging camps or sawmills.

=== Travel and trade ===
The Snoqualmie traveled widely throughout their territory and beyond. Living in the foothills of the Cascades, they had close relations with several interior peoples, such as the Yakama, Wenatchi, and the Klickitat. The Snoqualmie regularly crossed over the mountains using several passes, which connected the vast trade networks of the Puget Sound to the other side of the mountains. The oldest pass used to cross the mountains was Snoqualmie Pass. However, after the adoption of horses, the Yakima Pass was easier to cross on horseback and soon became the more commonly used route, and Snoqualmie Pass fell out of use. Today, sections of Interstate 90 follows the trade routes used by the Snoqualmie.

The Snoqualmie were on the path of several major trade routes across the Cascades. One major route, starting near what is now the Seattle Waterfront, the route passed around Lake Washington towards Issaquah and into the Snoqualmie Valley, where it continued along the Snoqualmie River and across the mountains. Another major trade route to the northern Puget Sound between the Snohomish and Yakama peoples passed through Snoqualmie territory, via the Snoqualmie River. Due to being directly on the path of trade between the east and west sides of the mountains, the Snoqualmie directly controlled trade flowing across the mountains, allowing them to become very powerful in relation to other Puget Sound peoples.

The Snoqualmie also made great use of canoes, like other Indigenous peoples on the Northwest Coast. Although there were major barriers to river travel like Snoqualmie Falls, it was common to simply portage canoes around the falls to continue along the river. The Snoqualmie used canoes in their own territory, and they also kept canoes near Mercer Slough (Lushootseed: saʔcaqaɬ) for use on Lake Washington, which could also be used on journeys to the Sound. Even today, canoes are important to the culture of the Snoqualmie. Every year, the Snoqualmie take part in Canoe Journey, a festival intended to maintain friendships between tribes from Puget Sound and beyond.

== Society ==
The bilateral kinship system was historically the foundation of Snoqualmie society, and the basis for higher social organization like that of the village. Coast Salish societies, including that of the Snoqualmie, were historically dominated by the village and the extended family. However, there was also some identity and organization above the village level, going as high as the drainage system in which one lived. This analysis of traditional society is supported by most anthropologists today, however, there has been considerable debate on the nature of Snoqualmie traditional society, and the nature of Coast Salish societies as a whole, during the chaotic and fluid 19th and 20th centuries.

=== Class system ===
Snoqualmie society was stratified into three classes: high-class (siʔab), low-class (p̓aƛ̕aƛ̕), and slave class (studəq). Within the high-class families, there was also differences in the elite-ness of various families. Most families were upper class, with few lower-class families and even fewer slaves, owned by the wealthiest of the wealthy. Recognition of class rank was regional and based on one's family. While it was possible to move up and down the social ladder, it was uncommon, and most people inherited their high-class status from their families.

Nobility was traditionally displayed in many ways. Having an important or famous name, a powerful spirit power, and proper behavior (such as generosity and diligence) were clear indications of high-class status. Class was also indicated by the size of one's house, or by one's wealth and prestige. On the other hand, laziness, selfishness, unruliness, as well as a general lack of prosperity, wisdom, and knowledge were seen as evidence of low-class status. Low class families were identified as those who had "lost their history," as described by anthropologist Wayne Suttles.

Particularly prestigious members of high-class families, such as powerful warriors or religious leaders, often became prominent leaders in their village and in broader society. Although they could wield great influence, they had no real authority over anyone else. While they organized and led various tasks, they could not force anyone to come with them or finish the job. Rather, a leader merely supervised the tasks and made suggestions which were often heeded because of their wisdom. Respected leaders were held in very high esteem by others, who often would donate portions of their food or gave other gifts to the leader as a token of respect. On the other hand, leaders which were not respected could simply be ignored with no threat of punishment. As the world began to change drastically during the early colonial period with the introduction of the fur trade, Snoqualmie leader Patkanim used the changing circumstances to his advantage to greatly increase his influence and authority, becoming a highly-powerful leader and controlling much of the trade on Puget Sound, paving the way for the later centralization of the Snoqualmie around his descendants.

Slaves were prisoners of war and their descendants. Not all families owned slaves, although the wealthiest person in a village would always have at least more than two. Slaves often did menial work such as collecting water, cleaning, or cutting firewood. In some families, master and slave worked alongside each other, but slaves always did more work.

=== Property ownership and stewardship ===
Certain types of property were owned privately, while others were owned by anyone who helped steward them. High value or rare resources, including root-digging plots, were private property, inherited from one's family. Other properties, such as houses, weirs, forts, and canoes, were available to use by anyone who helped in the construction. This resulted in most labor being voluntary, as participating in labor only served to help yourself and others.

=== Centralization under Patkanim ===
In the early colonial period, the fur trade created circumstances enabling peoples far to the north, such as the Lekwiltok of the Kwakwaka'wakw, to begin large-scale annual raiding of peoples to the south for slaves, including the Snoqualmie. This resulted in a massive expansion of warfare and military capabilities among the Snoqualmie in order to defend against these raiders. Patkanim, a prominent leader of the time, used the expansion in trade and military to centralize and ferment his authority among the many Snoqualmie villages. Patkanim selected the village at tultxʷ to be his administrative center, while the village at what is now Fall City became his military center, strategically located and well defended by forts up and down the river.

Patkanim also innovated a new system of political organization around him and his family throughout the villages of the Snoqualmie drainage system. There were three levels: the village, the district, and the chiefdom. Each level of organization had a chief, a subchief, and a council of chiefs. On the village level, the highest ranking family head served as the village chief. There were four districts: Monroe, Tolt, Fall City, and North Bend. Each district had its own role in the administration and defense of the Snoqualmie drainage system. The Monroe district guarded the mouth of the Snoqualmie River, the North Bend district guarded the mountain passes, the Fall City district was the military headquarters of the region, and the Tolt district functioned as a de facto capitol of the region. Patkanim appointed four of his relatives to be head chief of each district. Patkanim made himself the head chief of all the districts, traveling throughout the year to administer the various villages in the drainage system. Sonowa and the upriver Snoqualmie remained quite powerful and Sonowa was given the status of sub-chief of the North Bend district by Patkanim.

In the early 20th century, the system developed by Patkanim continued to evolve further. Political systems which more closely resemble modern-day tribes began to emerge as a necessity to engage with the U.S. government for treaty rights. Following the loss of land of the Snoqualmie, the descendants of Patkanim reorganized the Snoqualmie political system into three villages at Lake Sammamish, Tolt, and Meadowbrook. The new system continued to be centered around Tolt and governed by the Kanim family under Jerry Kanim until his death in 1956.

== Successor tribes ==
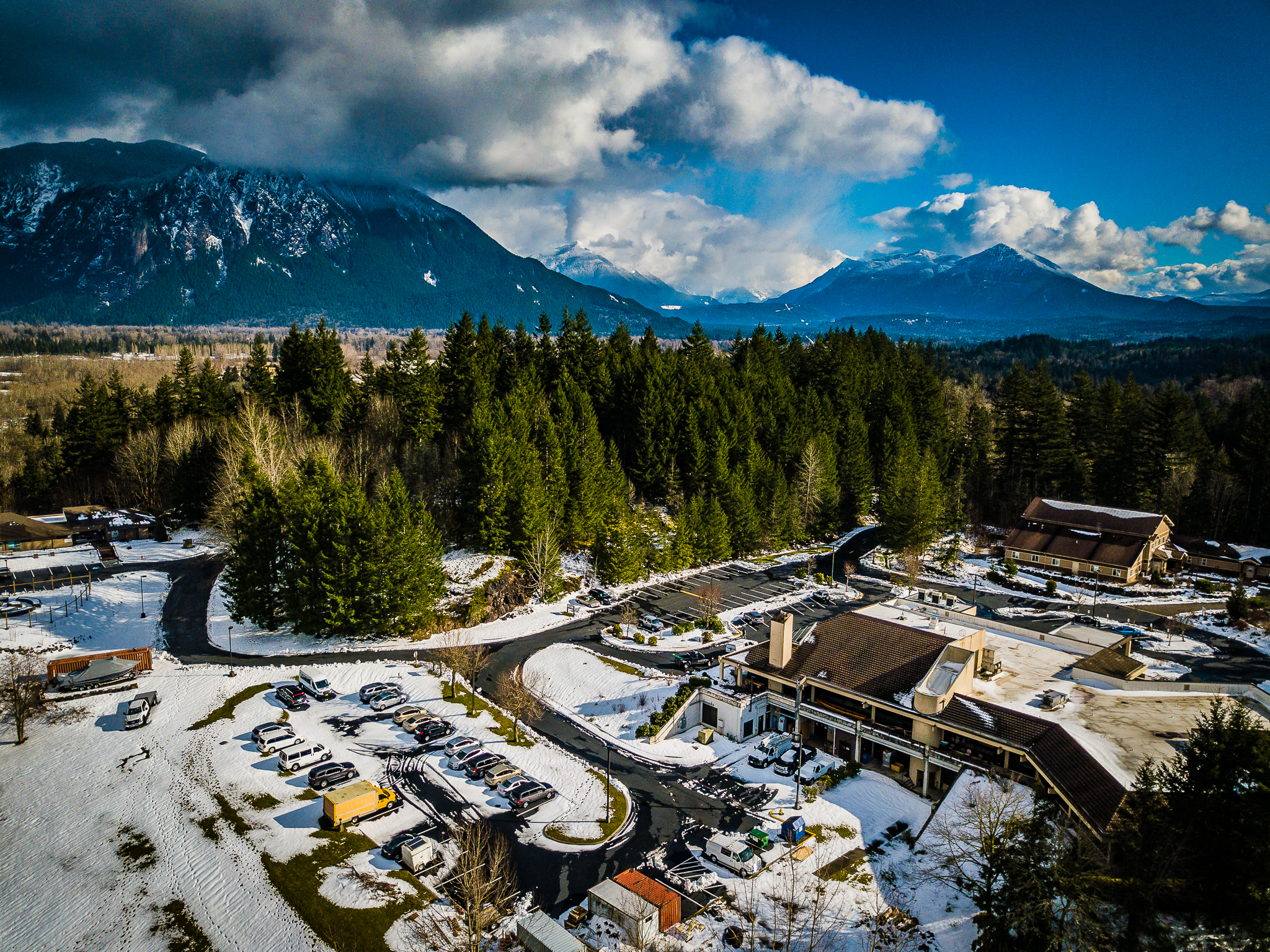
Government campus of the Snoqualmie Tribe

=== Snoqualmie Indian Tribe ===
The Snoqualmie Indian Tribe is a federally recognized tribe based in Snoqualmie, Washington. They gained federal recognition in 1999. The Snoqualmie Tribe was originally recognized by the BIA as some kind of tribal entity for about 100 years, until around the 1950s. Around that time, the federal government ceased to recognize the tribe, however, it is not clear why or when this recognition ceased to exist. In 1927, the Snoqualmie Tribe joined many other Western Washington tribes in a lawsuit against the federal government, Duwamish et al v. the United States. At that time, Jerry Kanim, treaty rights activist and nephew of Patkanim, was the chief of the Snoqualmie Tribe. The non-recognized Snoqualmie eventually reorganized as the Snoqualmie Tribal Organization, whose membership was primarily composed of non-reservation Snoqualmie listed on 1919 and 1923 lists.

=== Tulalip Tribes of Washington ===
The Tulalip Tribes of Washington is a federally recognized tribe based in Tulalip Bay, Washington. The tribe was created by the 1855 Treaty of Point Elliott as the successor to the Snohomish, Skykomish, Snoqualmie, and Stillaguamish peoples. Although most Snoqualmie stayed in their homelands, many Snoqualmie were able to gain land on the Tulalip Reservation, whose descendants make up the Snoqualmie community at Tulalip.

== Notable Snoqualmie ==
- Patkanim (paƛ̕adib), prominent Snoqualmie leader in the 19th century
- Sonowa, also known as Sanawa, prominent leader of the upriver band of Snoqualmie in the 19th century

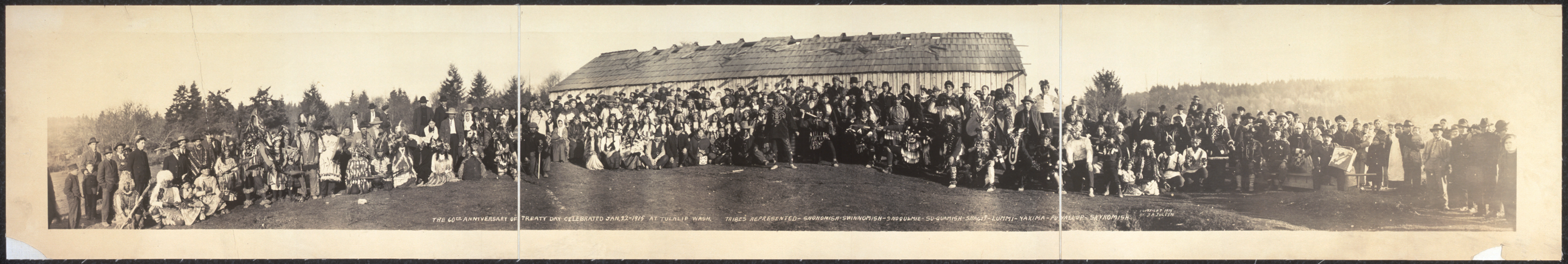
The 60th annual Treaty Day celebration at Tulalip, with members of the Snoqualmie in attendance (c. Jan 22, 1914)
