= Muckleshoot =

Federally-recognized tribe in Washington state, US

Muckleshoot Indian Tribe bəqəlšuɬ
- Location of the Muckleshoot Reservation
- Languages: Lushootseed, English
- Ethnic groups: Duwamish; Stkamish; Smulkamish; Skopamish; Upper Puyallup
- Demonym: Muckleshoot
- Type: Federally-recognized tribe
- Legislature: Muckleshoot Tribal Council

Establishment
  - Treaty of Medicine Creek: December 26, 1854
  - Treaty of Point Elliott: 1855
  - Muckleshoot Reservation established: January 20, 1857
  - Constitution ratified: October 21, 1936
- Website https://www.muckleshoot.nsn.us/

The Muckleshoot Indian Tribe (/ˈmʌkəlʃut/ MUH-kəl-shoot; Lushootseed: bəqəlšuɬ [ˈbəqəlʃuɬ]), also known as the Muckleshoot Tribe, is a federally-recognized tribe based in Auburn, Washington.

The tribe governs the Muckleshoot Reservation and is composed of descendants of the Duwamish, Stkamish, Smulkamish, Skopamish, Yilalkoamish, and Upper Puyallup peoples. The Muckleshoot Indian Tribe's sovereign government was formally established in 1936, after the Indian Reorganization Act of 1934, but its origins lie in the creation of the Muckleshoot Reservation in 1874 under the treaties of Medicine Creek (1854) and Point Elliott (1855).

== Name ==
The name "Muckleshoot" is an anglicization of the Lushootseed word bəqəlšuɬ.

bəqəlšuɬ originally referred only to a prairie, located between the White and Green rivers, and never as a word to refer to the peoples living in this area. Prior to the establishment of the Muckleshoot reservation, the Indigenous peoples of the Green-White river systems were variously called "Green River Indians", "White River Indians", or by their native village terms (such as Skopamish). The name "Muckleshoot" was first recorded in a survey conducted by George Gibbs from 1853-1856, where he recorded "Mukl-shootl", as being a "prairie between the White and Green [rivers]. U.S. Military Station".

The term evolved from referring to a prairie, to referring to a military outpost on the prairie. After the reservation was established at the fort, it took the name of the prairie, and later, was applied to the Indians living at the reservation. The earliest recorded use of "Muckleshoot" to refer to a people was in 1864, by John Montgomery, who described his wife as "an Indian woman of the Muckleshute Band of the Klikitat Tribe." Montgomery, like other settlers at the time, evidently referred to peoples east of the Cascade mountains indiscriminately as "Klikitats," and likely thought that the "Muckleshutes" of the Muckleshoot Reservation were a sub-group of the "Klikitats", due to close ties between the peoples of the Green and White rivers and the interior peoples. In 1868 and 1870, reports from the Commissioner of Indian Affairs described the "Muckleshoots" and the "Muckleshoot Tribe" living at the Muckleshoot Reservation.

== History ==
Tribal distribution map by Leslie Spier (1936)

The Muckleshoot Indian Tribe is the successor of various groups which lived along the Duwamish River's watershed, and parts of the upper Puyallup River's watershed. These include the:

- Duwamish
- Stkamish
- Smulkamish
- Skopamish, the name for all peoples living along the Green River. This term covered eight to ten independent villages along the river, such as the Yilalkoamish.
- Upper Puyallup peoples
  - Tkwakwamish

=== Reservation establishment ===
The origins of the Muckleshoot Indian Tribe lie in the 1854 Treaty of Medicine Creek and the 1855 Treaty of Point Elliott. Although the Stkamish, Skopamish, and Smulkamish bands are mentioned in the preamble to the Treaty of Point Elliott, they did not sign the treaty directly. Along with the Sammamish, they were assumed by the territorial governor of Washington Territory, Isaac Stevens, to be under the control of the Duwamish and Seattle. Stevens organized treaty negotiations around centralized leadership by appointing single "chiefs" as leaders of entire groups. The decision of creating these political offices was not based on the indigenous social organization, and as such, Seattle was appointed as a "head chief" of a Duwamish Tribe that included all the peoples living along the Duwamish watershed, including the Green and White rivers' population. For this reason, the Muckleshoot Tribe has variously claimed that they have both a treaty and non-treaty status. Furthermore, the Muckleshoot Reservation exists on territory ceded by the Treaty of Point Elliott, but was dictated by the Treaty of Medicine Creek (and only the Medicine Creek treaty was ratified at the time), further contributing to the confusion.

The treaties were unpopular with many, and due to the continuing hostility, the Puget Sound War began shortly after, in 1855. The ancestral bands of the Muckleshoot joined the war against the American government. At the war's conclusion, during the Fox Island Council, governor Stevens agreed to the establishment of a new reservation for groups who had not received a reservation under the prior treaties. At Fox Island, Stevens agreed that a reservation would be created in all the lands between the White and Green rivers, including Muckleshoot Prairie.

The Muckleshoot Reservation was eventually established on January 20, 1857 by an executive order from U.S. president Franklin Pierce. However, the reservation did not include all the land previously promised at the Fox Island Council, including traditional fishing and village sites. The reservation would be later expanded in 1874 by president Ulysses S. Grant.

=== Establishment of the Muckleshoot Indian Tribe ===
In 1934, the Indian Reorganization Act allowed Native Americans living on reservations to establish their own governments. The peoples of the Muckleshoot Reservation voted to establish the Muckleshoot Indian Tribe. In 1936, they established a constitution and bylaws. Around this time, in 1937, the Muckleshoot Tribe had 194 enrolled members.

=== Treaty rights and fishing rights ===
Treaty-reserved fishing rights became central to Muckleshoot legal and political history in the twentieth century. The Medicine Creek and Point Elliott treaty framework reserved fishing at usual and accustomed grounds and stations, while later state regulation limited off-reservation fishing in practice.

Muckleshoot oral historian Warren King George identified an 1892 citation of a tribal member known as Big John as an early documented dispute over off-reservation fishing. Big John was fined, ordered to dismantle a traditional fish weir or face imprisonment, and barred from traditional fishing practices.

The Muckleshoot Tribe were denied their land claims in Duwamish Indians v. United States, on the basis that there was no treaty with the "Muckleshoot". Later, however, in 1959, the Indian Claims Commission found that the ancestors of the Muckleshoot had possessed 101,620 acres (158.78 sq mi; 411.2 km^{2}) of land, valued at $86,377. On March 8, 1959, the Commission ordered that the Muckleshoot Tribe be paid that amount by the United States.

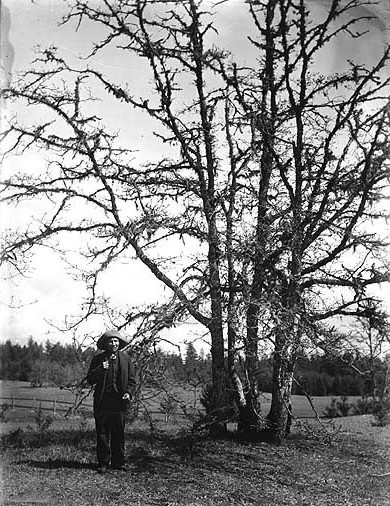
Slugumus Koquilton standing next to an oak tree near Sequalitchew Lake (c. 1906)

A large Army quartermaster depot was established in the Green River Valley at the south end of Auburn to take advantage of railways. It served the ports along Puget Sound, supporting the US war effort in the Pacific. In the post-World War II era, Auburn began to be more industrialized. Together with rapid population growth in the region, which developed many suburbs, these changes put pressure on the Muckleshoot and their reservation holdings. Many private land owners tried to prevent them from fishing and hunting in traditional territories.

In the 1960s and 1970s, the Muckleshoot engaged in a series of protests, intended at protecting their fragile ecosystem. Known as the Fish Wars, these protests attempted to preserve Muckleshoot fishing rights in nearby rivers that were not within the official reservation. County and state authorities had tried to regulate their fishing off-reservation. Similarly, the state tried to regulate other tribes in their fishing along the coastal waters.

In the Boldt Decision, the federal district court upheld the right of the Muckleshoot and other Treaty peoples to fish from the rivers of the region and hunt in these territories. It ruled that the Native Americans had rights to half the catch in their traditional areas. It designated the Muckleshoot as co-managers of the King County watershed, with control over fishing and hunting in their "Usual and Accustomed" historical fishing and hunting grounds.

Declining salmon populations, river modification, and water-quality concerns later became part of the tribe’s treaty-rights and watershed-restoration work. In the Cedar River watershed, water diversion and the Landsburg Diversion Dam affected salmon habitat and fish passage, and the Muckleshoot Indian Tribe later challenged aspects of Seattle’s habitat-conservation plan. The tribe has continued to participate in salmon restoration and treaty-rights enforcement.

In 2006, Seattle and the Muckleshoot Indian Tribe signed a Cedar River settlement addressing instream flows, hatchery operations, tribal access, compensation, and a framework for continued city-tribal coordination.

In 2022, Muckleshoot representatives took part in a Green River levee-removal project near Auburn intended to improve salmon habitat. The project was conducted within an area where the tribe has treaty-protected fishing rights.

Muckleshoot representatives have also described salmon-rights issues as extending beyond harvest levels. King George described such disputes as part of a wider restriction on Muckleshoot access to natural resources, including shellfish, huckleberries, hazelnuts, ferns, and other plants. Muckleshoot Fish Commission member Phil Hamilton later described salmon-rights issues as increasingly environmental, with habitat loss and water quality remaining central concerns for salmon populations.

== Government and politics ==
=== Tribal Council ===
The Muckleshoot Tribe is governed under their constitution, which was approved on May 13, 1936 and was ratified later that year, on October 21, 1936. The primary governing body is the Muckleshoot Tribal Council, a nine-member elected body. The Tribal Council is subject to the General Council, which is composed of all citizens of the Muckleshoot Tribe.

The Muckleshoot Tribe is a member of an intertribal court system, which was formed in 1978.

=== Law enforcement ===
The Muckleshoot Reservation falls under Public Law 280 jurisdiction, with police services supplied by King County and Auburn. The Muckleshoot Indian Tribe and the King County Sheriff's Office have provided tribal police services since 2000. The Muckleshoot Police Department includes a police chief, a storefront deputy, a school resource officer, a Muckleshoot Housing Authority deputy, and patrol deputies assigned to a Community Response Team.

In 2023, the King County Sheriff's Office and the Muckleshoot Indian Tribe Police Department established a Missing and Murdered Indigenous Women and Persons cold-case detective position with support from a U.S. Department of Justice grant.

== Reservation and land base ==
Most Muckleshoot citizens live on or near the 15.871 km^{2} (6.128 sq mi) Muckleshoot Reservation. The reservation is located between the White and Green rivers on Muckleshoot Prairie (47°15′43″N 122°08′45″W), southeast of Auburn, Washington. The reservation is situated in parts of King and Pierce counties. Approximately 1,201 acres of the land on the reservation was in trust in 1975.

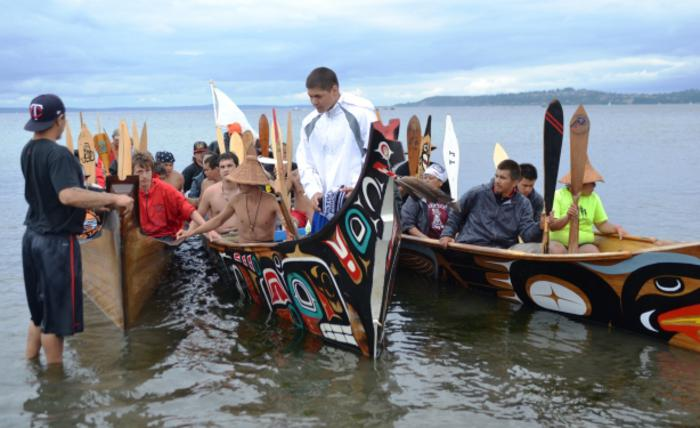
Muckleshoot landing at Alki during Canoe Journey 2012

On November 6, 2013, the Muckleshoot Tribe bought 150 square miles (390 km^{2}) of forest in Washington state to add to its landholdings.

== Demographics ==
As of 2023, the Muckleshoot Tribe has 3,353 enrolled members, of which 1,522 (±337) are of Muckleshoot ancestry alone. As of 2023, the Muckleshoot Reservation has a population of around 3,959 (±569), of which 1,421 (±194) are White, 73 (±50) are Black or African American, 1,103 (±290) are American Indian and Alaska Native, 171 (±114) are Asian, 96 (±102) are Native Hawaiian and Other Pacific Islander, 373 (±151) are Some Other Race, and 722 (±216) are Two or More Races.

== Culture and language ==
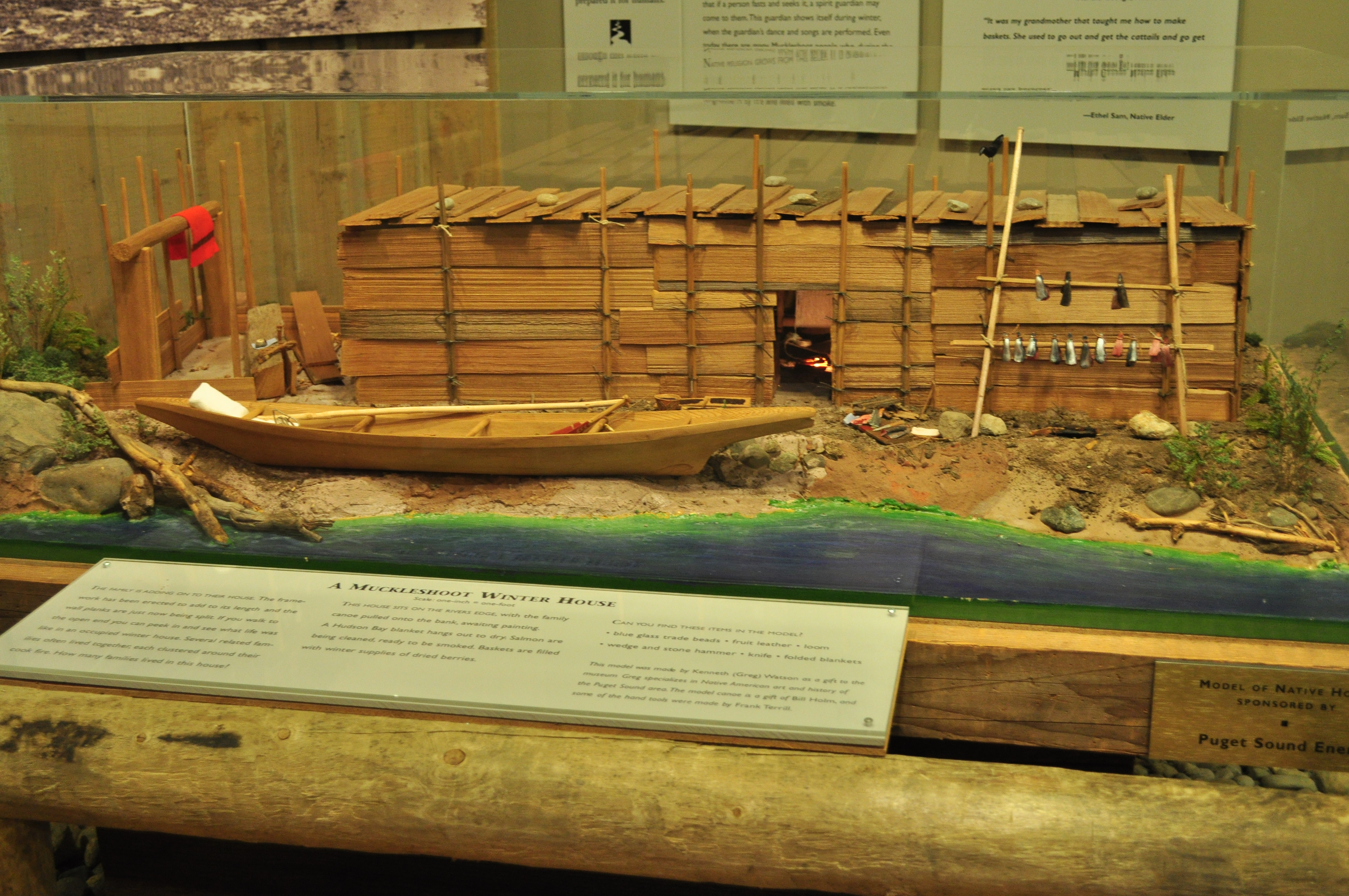
Model of a traditional Coast Salish winter house, located in the White River Valley Museum

The Muckleshoot speak the southern dialect of Lushootseed, called Whulshootseed. The specific variety of Southern Lushootseed spoken at Muckleshoot is called bəqəlšuɬucid, 'Muckleshoot language'. Use of the language has declined, and English is now the majority language. Lushootseed instruction continues in tribal and regional educational settings, including Muckleshoot Tribal School. Muckleshoot citizens Earnie Barr, Eva Jerry, Bertha McJoe, Bernice Tanewasha, and Ellen Williams were involved in creating a written form for Lushootseed.

The Muckleshoot Tribe holds Skopabsh Days each August, which is a three-day festival that features traditional arts, crafts, cooking, and clothing. Additionally, each July, the Muckleshoot Tribe hosts the Muckleshoot Sobriety Powwow.

First Salmon ceremonies are part of Lushootseed and other Coast Salish salmon traditions. Historical accounts describe the first salmon of a run as being eaten ceremonially, with its bones or remains returned to the water. Muckleshoot elder and historian Warren King George identified a Green River site near Auburn as a traditional first-salmon ceremony location, where the remains of the first salmon were returned to the water, usually on cedar branches. King George also described the ceremony as an annual gathering in which the community gives thanks for the salmon’s return. Muckleshoot fishers have also taught younger family members traditional net fishing for spring salmon, including processing, drying, and smoking practices.

== Economy and services ==
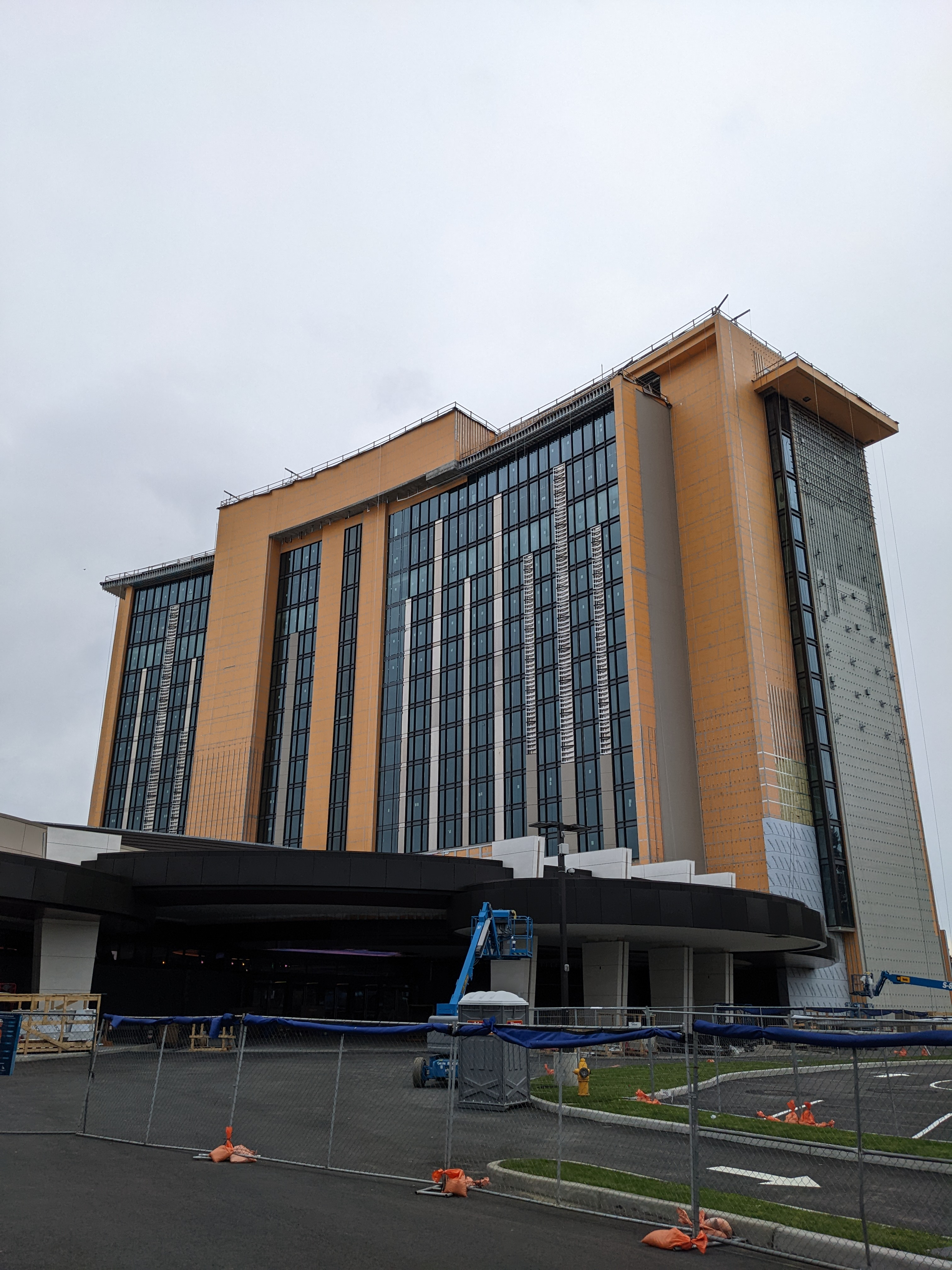
Muckleshoot Casino hotel under construction, March 2023

Most Muckleshoot citizens are employed by industries in the nearby city of Auburn, as well as by the tribal government. Others engage in fishing, logging, or agriculture on the reservation. The tribe manages fisheries and hatcheries, as well as a community center, community housing, a library, a medical and dental clinic, an educational training program, and a youth group program. In total, the tribe employs 1,200, and is the second-largest employer in southern King County. The Bureau of Indian Affairs lists it among tribal entities eligible for federal services.

=== Economic developments ===
The tribe won settlements from Puget Sound Power & Light for the long-term effects of dam construction and the state government for imposing sales taxes on the reservation. It used proceeds from the settlements, as well as revenue from a bingo hall, to purchase more than 800 acres (320 ha) of land on the reservation by 1995.

In 2006, the tribe entered into a $42 million agreement with the Seattle City Council for the conservation and protection of the Cedar River.

The Muckleshoot Tribe acquired the Salish Lodge at Snoqualmie Falls for $62.5 million in 2007. It sold the site to the Snoqualmie Tribe for $125 million in 2019.

Since 2019, the tribe has signed sponsorship agreements with the Seattle Seahawks and Seattle Mariners that include naming rights and jersey sponsorships. The Seattle Kraken began wearing a sponsorship patch with the Muckleshoot Tribe's logo during the 2023–24 NHL season. The Associated Press reported that the Kraken partnership was the first jersey sponsorship in the four major North American men’s professional sports leagues to show a Native American tribe rather than a casino. The tribe is also a naming rights sponsor of the Muckleshoot Heritage Plaza at Lumen Field, the home stadium of the Seahawks and Seattle Sounders FC, through an agreement signed in 2019.

=== Muckleshoot Casino ===
The Muckleshoot Tribe opened the Muckleshoot Casino in April 1995, following changes to Native American gaming laws. The casino and bingo parlor, built with a tropical theme, included an off-track horse racing betting area. Since then, the facility has been expanded four times. The White River Amphitheatre was developed by the tribe on land adjacent to the casino and opened in June 2003. Revenue from these ventures funded the construction of a new tribal medical facility, tribal administrative offices, and a new Indian Shaker church in the early 2000s. Twenty percent of all revenue from tribal gaming is spent on education.

The Muckleshoot Casino was expanded in January 2024 with the opening of an 18-story hotel with 401 rooms. The casino itself was expanded to 300,000 square feet (28,000 m^{2}); a parking garage at the site opened in 2021.

=== Transportation ===
Since 2017, Muckleshoot Tribal Transit has offered free bus service on the reservation. The transit is funded by grants from the Federal Transit Administration and the Bureau of Indian Affairs.

=== Education ===
Educational services are provided through the Muckleshoot Child Care, Muckleshoot Tribal Schools, and the Muckleshoot Tribal College. Muckleshoot Tribal Schools began in 1984, and provide education which emphasizes Indigenous history, art, dance, and culture, as well as language. In 1997, MTS began offering all high-school grades. A K-12 school facility opened in 2009. Students can earn an associate degree at Muckleshoot Tribal College.
