= Southern Lushootseed =

Southernmost dialect of the Lushootseed language

- Twulshootseed, Whulshootseed
- xʷəlšucid (Muckleshoot and Snoqualmie dialects) txʷəlšucid (elsewhere)
- Native to: United States
- Region: Washington
- Ethnicity: Muckleshoot, Puyallup, Suquamish, Duwamish, Nisqually, Squaxin Island
- Extinct: 4 January 2016, with the death of Ellen Williams
- Revival: exist
- Language family: Salishan: Coast Salish; Lushootseed; Southern Lushootseed

Language codes
- ISO 639-3: slh
- Glottolog: sout2965
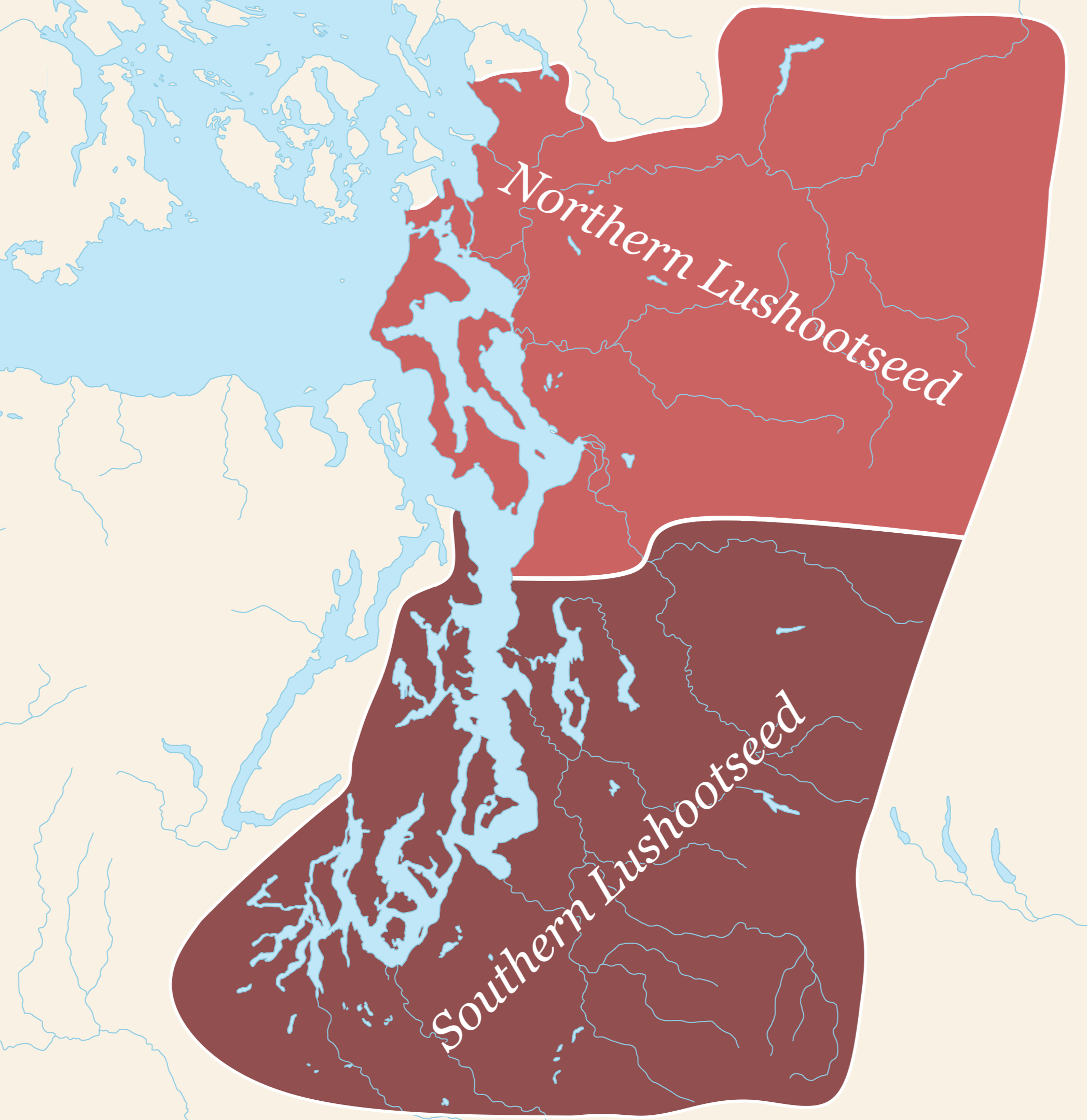
- Southern Lushootseed

Southern Lushootseed, also called Twulshootseed (txʷəlšucid) or Whulshootseed (xʷəlšucid) in the Muckleshoot and Snoqualmie dialects, is the southern dialect of Lushootseed, a Coast Salish language in western Washington State. It was historically spoken by the Muckleshoot, Puyallup, Suquamish, Duwamish, Nisqually, and Squaxin Island tribes. The last fluent speaker was Ellen Williams (1923–2016) and her death rendered the language extinct.

== Language classes ==
Whulshootseed is taught at the Muckleshoot Language Program of the Muckleshoot Tribal College in Auburn, Washington, at a local school, and by the Puyallup Tribal Language Program. A 1999 video, Muckleshoot: a People and Their Language profiles the Muckleshoot Whulshootseed Language Preservation Project.

Community classes for Southern Lushootseed are offered through Tidelands gallery in Seattle.

== See also ==
- Lushootseed language
