= Green River Trail =

Washington state bicycle and pedestrian trail

Coordinates: 47°30′31″N 122°18′02″W

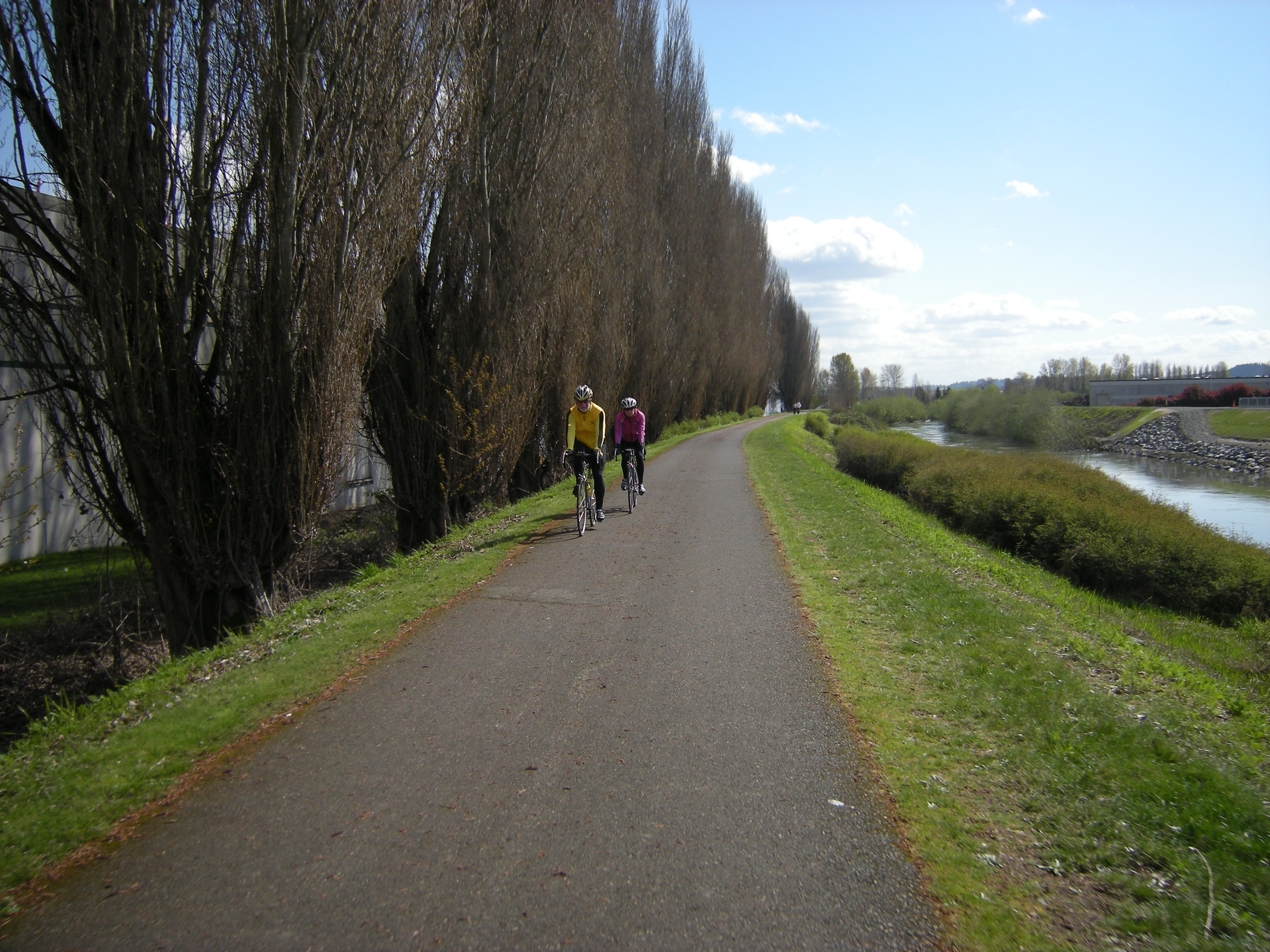
Bicycles on the Green River Trail along the Desimone Levee in Kent.

The Green River Trail is a 19.6-mile (31.5 km) pedestrian and bicycle trail in King County, Washington, USA. It runs along the banks of the Duwamish and Green Rivers, crossing the river several times on bridges. The trail goes through a variety of landscapes, ranging from industrial to rural.

The north end of the trail is near the turning basin of the Duwamish Waterway, near the south Seattle city limits. Heading upriver, the trail goes by Cecil Moses Park. It intersects the northern end of the Interurban Trail near Fort Dent Park in Tukwila, enters Kent near Briscoe Park (sometimes written as Brisco Park), and passes alongside the Green River Natural Resources Area and through the Riverbend Golf Complex, then meets the Interurban Trail again at Kent's Foster Park. Plans would extend the trail south through Auburn, Washington to Flaming Geyser State Park at the Green River Gorge.

== Route ==
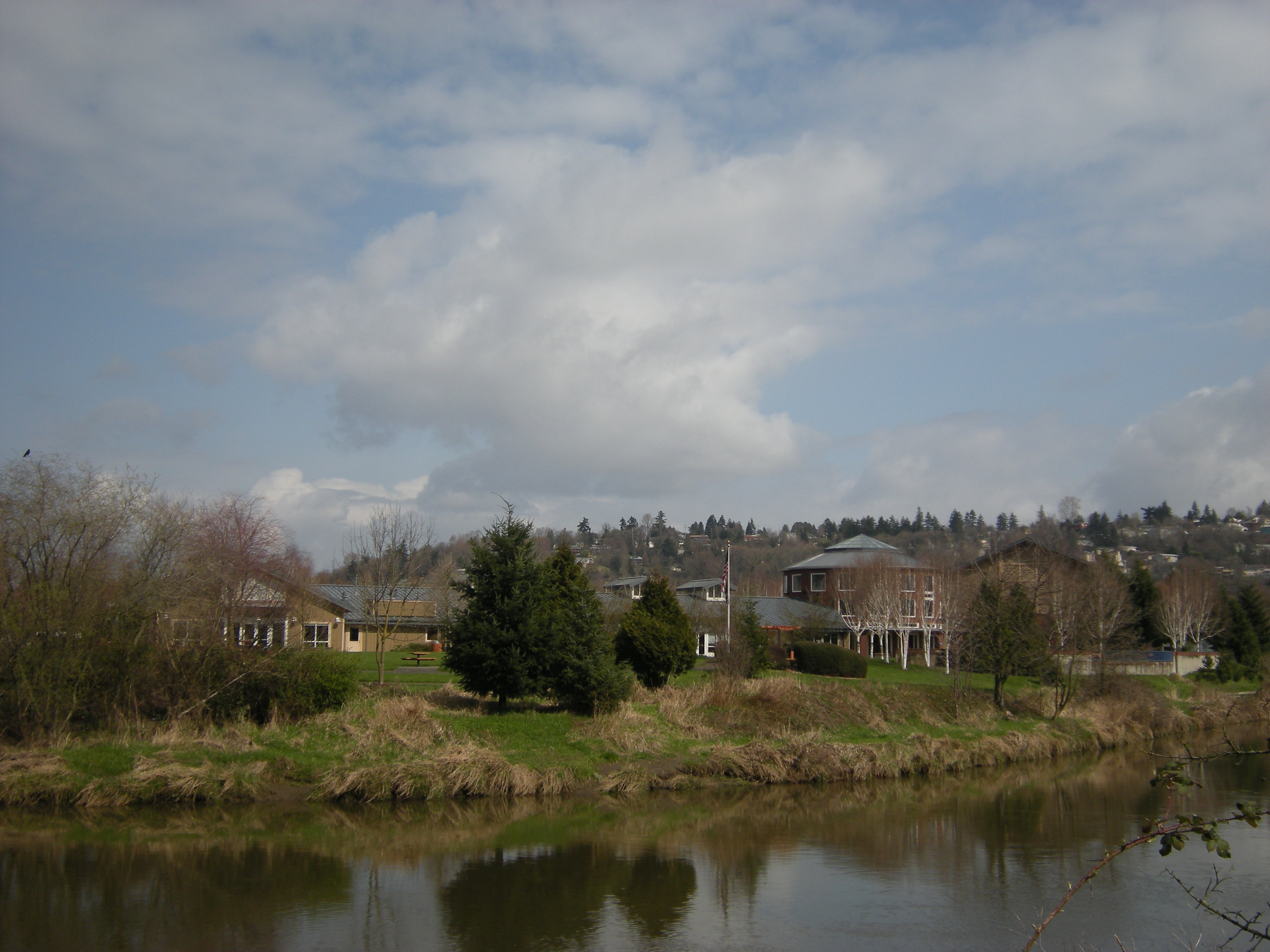
City of Tukwila Community Center, seen across the Duwamish from the trail.

Paved trail begins at the Turning Basin Restoration Area on the left (west) bank of the Duwamish; below this point, the Duwamish is deep-draft navigable. The turning basin allows large ships to turn and go back downstream. The trail passes Cecil Moses Memorial Park and crosses a bridge by North Wind's Weir, a Native American cultural site, then crosses back another bridge to the left bank.

Following the Duwamish, the trail continues past Tukwila's Allentown neighborhood, where the City of Tukwila Community Center can be seen across the river. It crosses under Interstate 5, past the Foster Golf Links (where it leaves the riverbank for a while), rejoins the river, and crosses again to the right bank just above the junction with the Black River. This junction defines the limit of the Duwamish River. Beyond here, the trail and wends through Fort Dent Park, following the right bank of the Green River, then leaves the park by crossing again to the left bank.

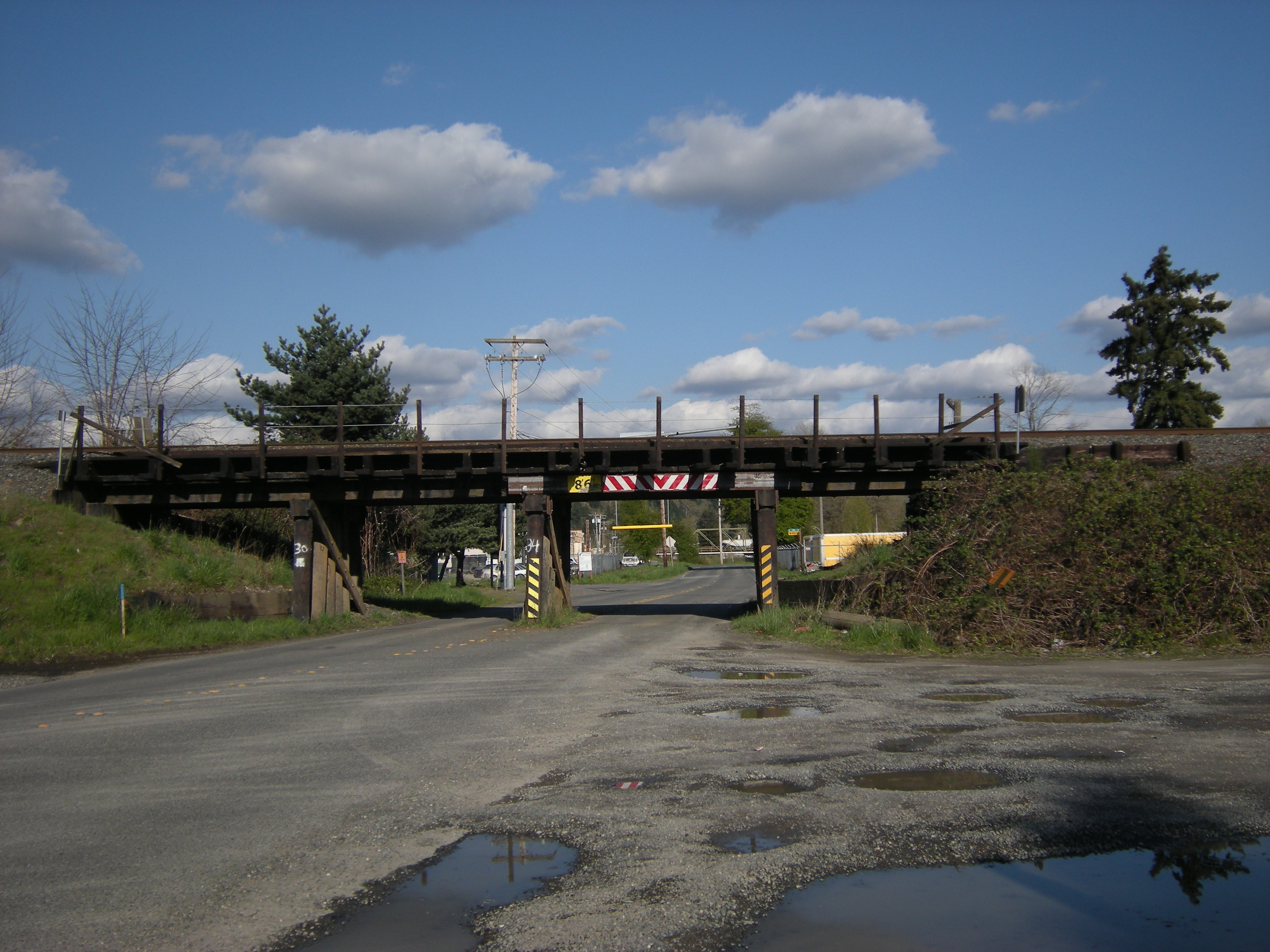
The official trail route continues past Foster Park on city streets, passing under this rail bridge.

Soon comes the northern junction with the Interurban Trail, which (after a few turns) heads almost straight south while the Green River Trail follows the more meandering riverbank. The trail crosses under Interstate 405, passes Tukwila's Bicentennial Park, and Minkler Pond, before eventually returning to the right bank of the Green River, where it runs along the Desimone Levee most of the way to Briscoe Park. As it continues generally south, it passes through or along several other public parks: Three Friends Fishing Hole, Anderson Park, the Green River Natural Resources Area, Van Doren's Landing Park, as well as several green belts.

Near Russell Road Park, the trail takes the first of several large bends. After rounding the Riverbend Golf Course, the trail runs generally east, eventually passing through Riverview Park and meeting up again with the Interurban trail at Foster Park. The trail officially continues along several Kent city streets until another riverside segment brings it to North Green River Park, the end of the current trail.
