= Boeing Plant 1 =

Airplane production facility

Coordinates: 47°31′49.01″N 122°18′40.32″W

Boeing Plant 1 (also known as Boeing Oxbow Plant) was the first airplane production facility of The Boeing Company, serving as its headquarters between 1917 and 1965 in Seattle, Washington, USA. Boeing Plant 1 was used for all aspects of the production of the early Boeing airplane models produced until the completion of Boeing Plant 2 in 1936.

By the 1950s Boeing Plant 1 consisted of more than 20 buildings. The facility was made obsolete by the larger airplanes produced in the 1930s and was used primarily as a forging plant and testing facility, as well as a producer of component parts used in the production of airplanes in other Boeing facilities. The Boeing Plant 1 site was sold to the Port of Seattle in 1970 and is currently located on the southern portion of the Port of Seattle Terminal 115 site.

Only two structures remain from the original Boeing Plant 1 site. One is Building No. 105, also known as the Red Barn, which is currently located at the Museum of Flight. The other is the 1929-vintage administration building, located on its original location, just south of the Terminal 115 site at 200 Southwest Michigan Street, Seattle.

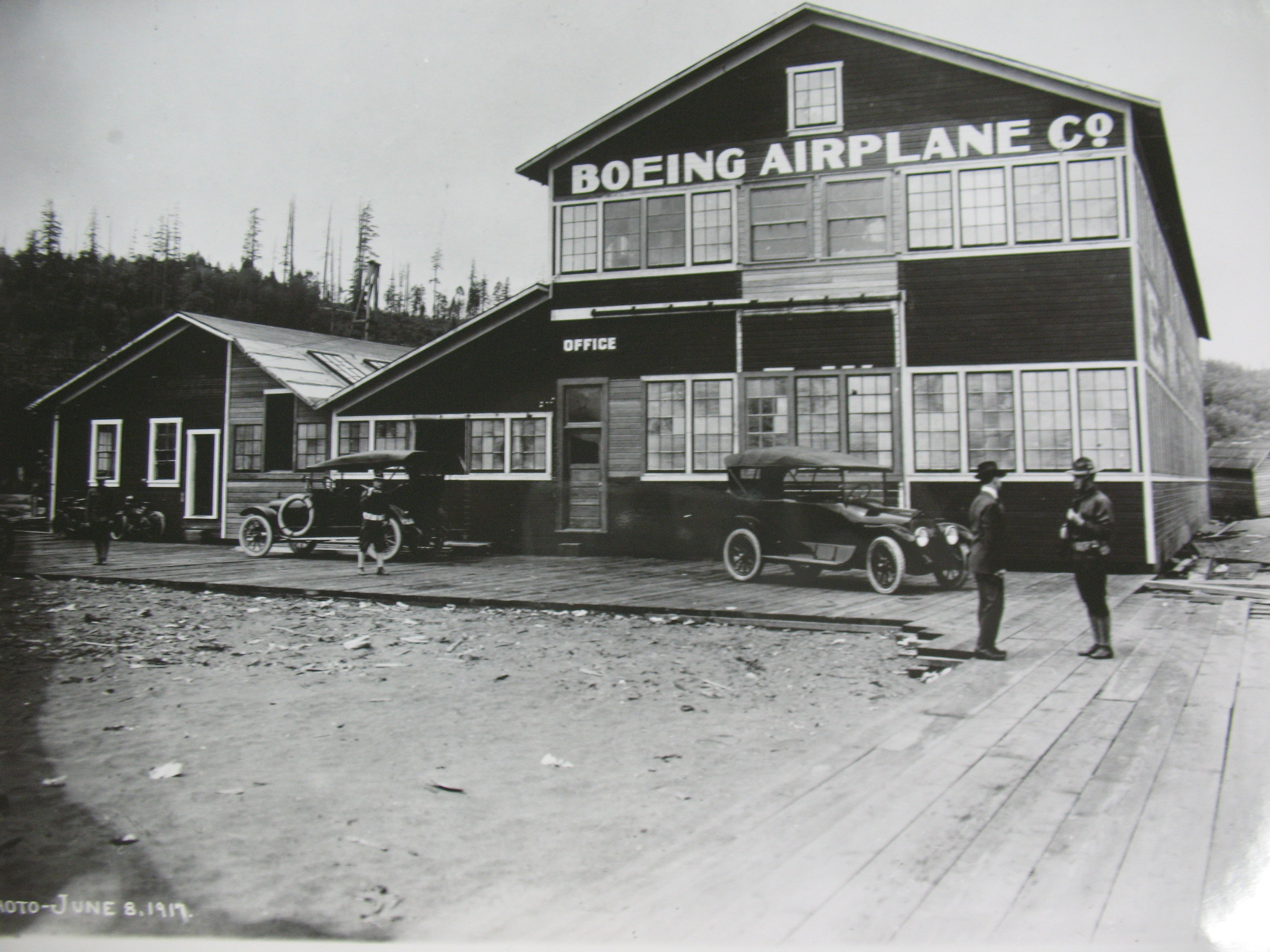
1917-era Boeing Plant 1

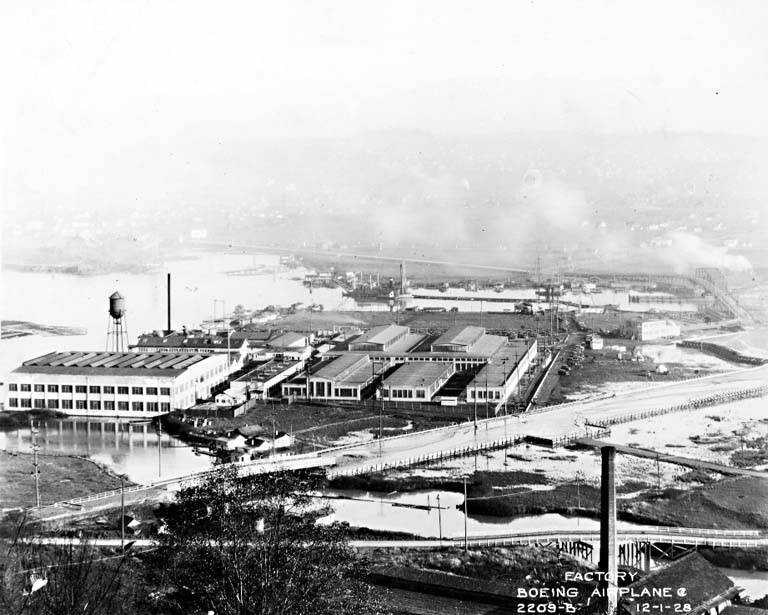
Aerial view of Boeing Plant 1 in 1928

== History ==
In 1909, Edward Heath constructed a wooden boat shipyard on an oxbow meander of the Duwamish River. Heath soon became insolvent, and William Boeing, for whom Heath was building a hugely expensive and luxurious yacht, bought the shipyard and land for ten dollars, in exchange for Boeing's acceptance of Heath's debts.

William Boeing, who had been an aircraft enthusiast since 1909, purchased a Martin "Birdcage" seaplane that he and Martin pilot James Floyd Smith assembled on the shore of Lake Union in Seattle, in 1915. After it was damaged in an accident during testing, and dissatisfied with the timeframe for receiving repair parts from Martin, Boeing decided he could build his own airplanes with the expertise of George Conrad Westervelt and wooden parts fabricated at the Heath facility. After two "B&W" seaplanes were completed in 1916, Boeing decided to go into business manufacturing airplanes and incorporated the Pacific Aero Products Company on July 15, 1916. The B&W seaplanes were offered to the Navy for testing, however, the Navy was not interested and regular production of aircraft would not commence until 1917 when US entry into World War I boosted the demand for Navy seaplanes.

In 1917 operations were consolidated at the Heath Shipyard site which, with completion of the Duwamish channelization in 1916, became suited for the entire development and manufacturing process from fabrication through flight testing. The renamed Boeing Company began producing aircraft in the simple barn-like structure, known as the Red Barn. The entirety of the aircraft was built within the barn's walls. During the first year of operations, Heath was the master woodsman in charge of woodworking at the factory until moving to Portland to start another wooden boat shipyard. Boeing expanded the facility through 1918, including a large assembly plant and several utility buildings.

After World War I, the private air fleet experienced a glut of cheap surplus warplanes, and the demand for airplane production plummeted. The Boeing Company was forced to decimate its employed staff and began producing furniture in lieu of new airplane contracts. During this period, Boeing began designing and producing aircraft specialized in the airmail industry.

In the mid-to-late 1920s, demand for aircraft began to pick up as air travel and airmail began to increase in practicality and popularity. Additional expansion of the Boeing Plant 1 site was completed in 1925 and the early 1930s. The expansion included new machine shop facilities, a hammer drop facility, paint spraying, and coating shops, and some component testing facilities.

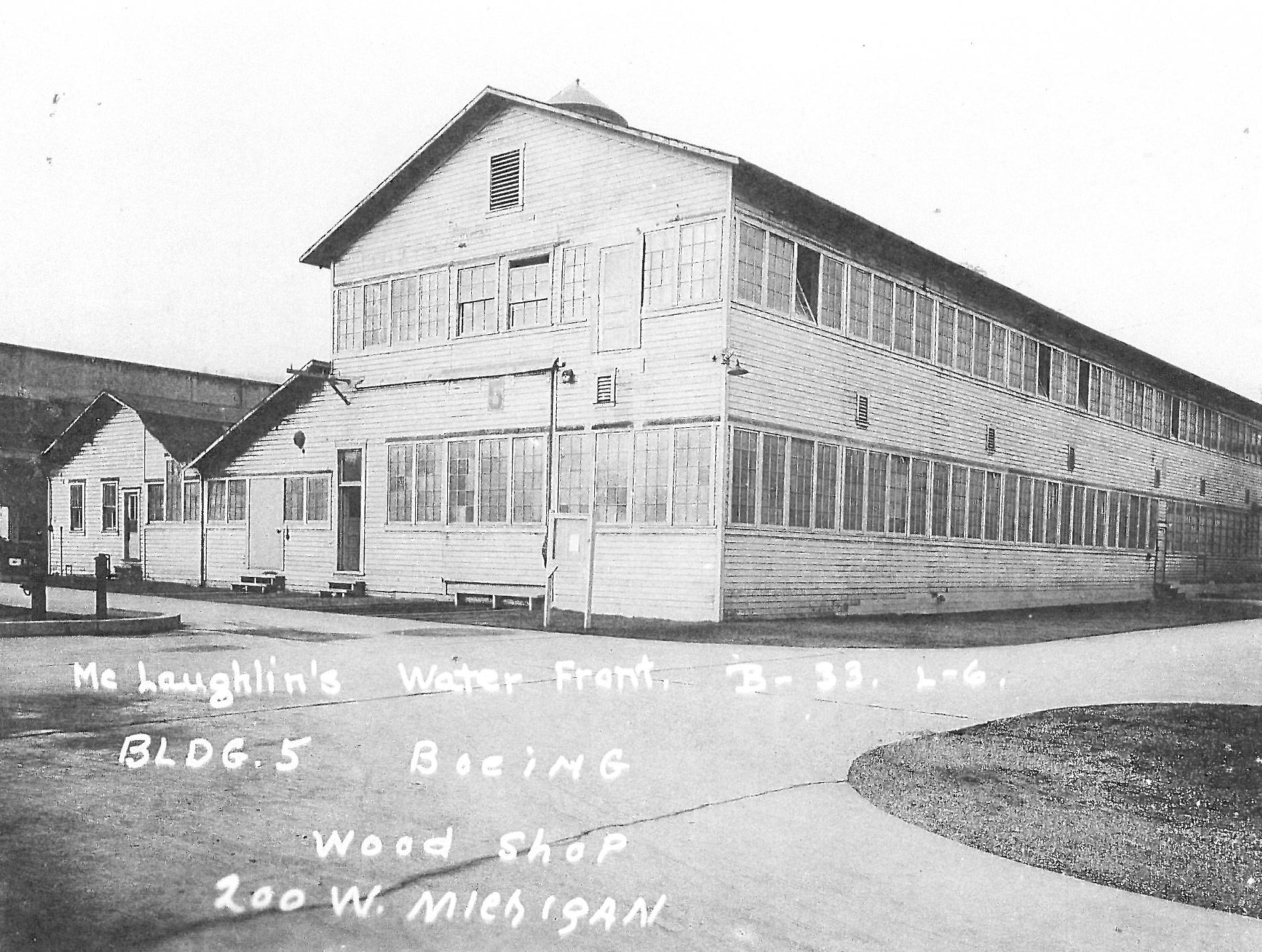
The Boeing Red Barn taken in 1937.

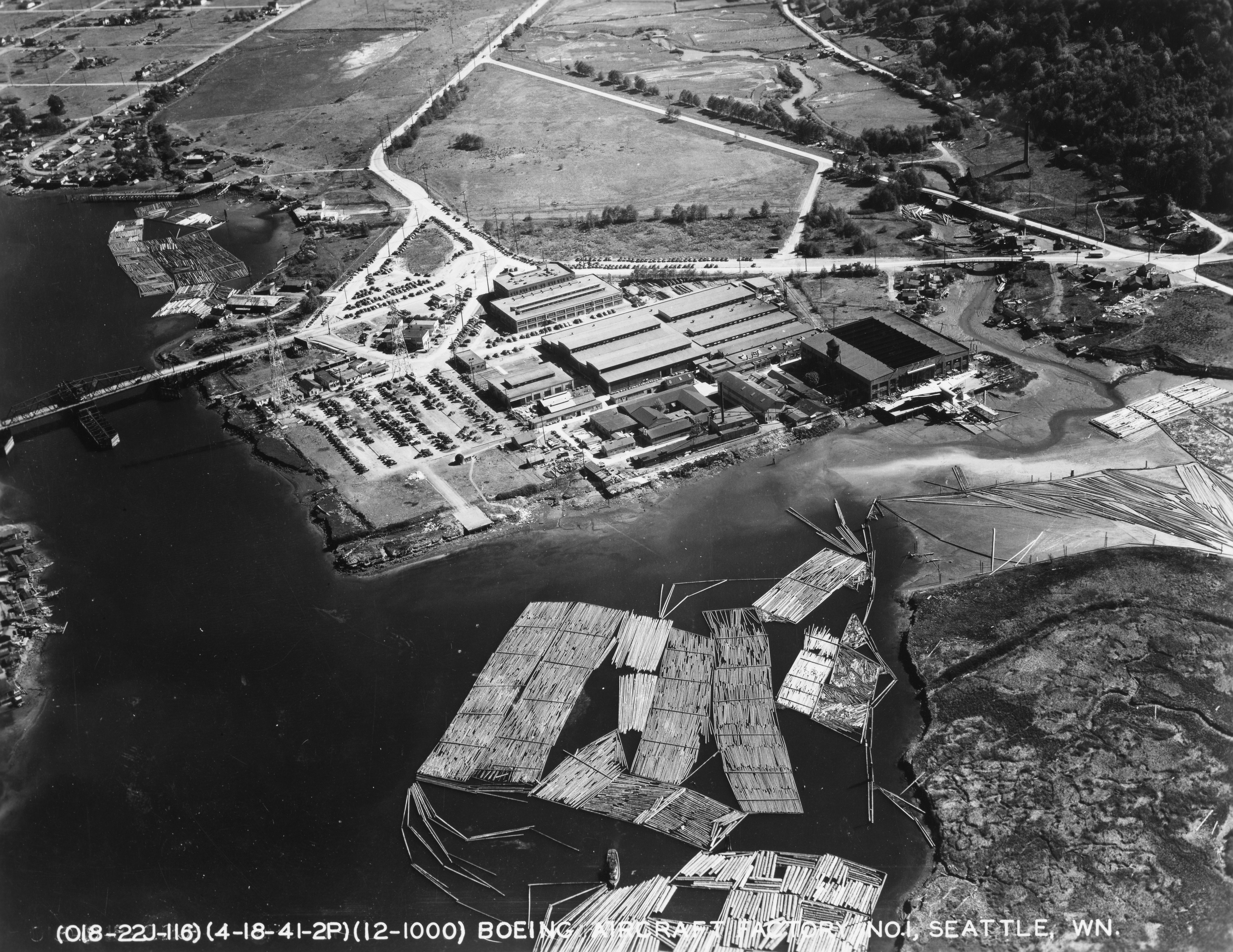
Aerial photo from 1941. Boeing 314 Clipper NC18609 ("Pacific Clipper") is visible on the launching quay.

Plant 1 served Boeing well while it was producing seaplanes that could be assembled then launched into the Duwamish Waterway for flight testing. For land planes the process was more cumbersome; airplanes were produced and assembled onsite, taken apart, barged to Boeing Airfield, flight tested, disassembled, and shipped to the buyer. With the introduction of larger all-metal airframes by Boeing in the 1930s, the need for a facility dedicated to metal fabrication and assembly with direct access to the airfield became critical for productivity and Plant 2 was opened on the east side of the Duwamish in 1936. The last model produced and assembled at the Boeing Plant 1 site was the 314 Clipper. Through its production run the 314, a large seaplane, was assembled on the launching quay of the Plant 1 Assembly Building.

During World War II the Plant 1 site was responsible for the production of airplane components for warplanes and testing. The Boeing static test facilities were greatly expanded in 1942 for the testing of new aircraft.

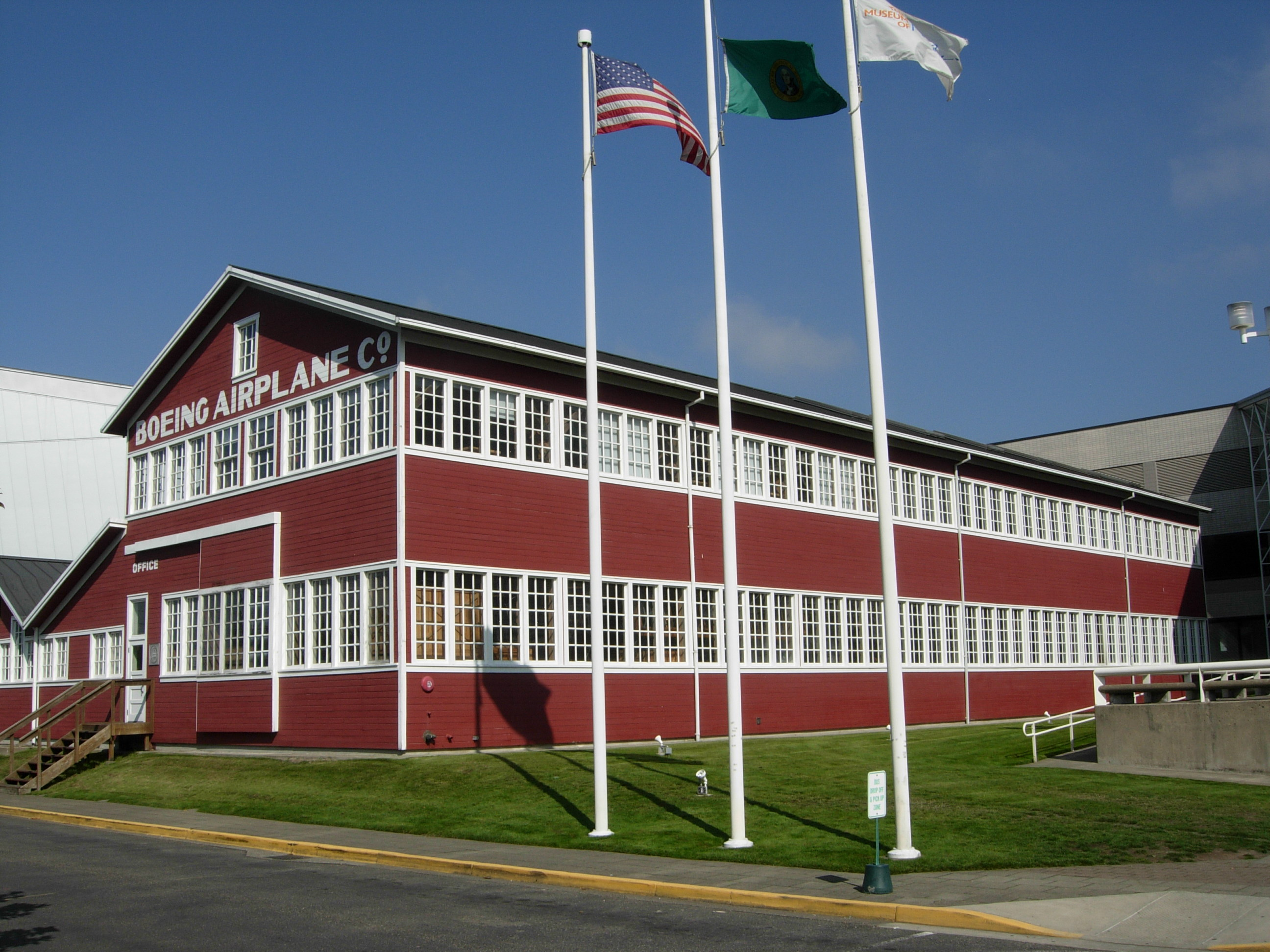
The Red Barn at the Museum of Flight in 2007.

In the post-war period, Boeing Plant 1 was used primarily as a components production facility and a test facility for engines, components, and fuel systems. These included fuel testing, a gun revetment, hydrostatic testing, static testing, and many others.

From the 1950s until 1967, Boeing Turbine Division was the main occupation of Plant 1. Turbine Division designed and manufactured three engine models from 100 to 300 HP. One was used in the Indianapolis 500, Several drone torpedo helicopters, fire trucks, Swedish S tanks and Korean War minesweepers.

The facility largely fell into decay in the 1960s, and in the wake of the Boeing Bust the site was sold to the Port of Seattle as part of the larger Terminal 115 project. The Boeing Plant 1 structures were demolished between 1970 and 1976. The now-famous red barn structure was nearly demolished, but was instead placed on the national historic register, barged down the river in 1975, and trucked to its current home at the Museum of Flight.
