= North Wind's Weir =

Site on Duwamish River, Washington

Coordinates: 47.503233°N 122.296744°W

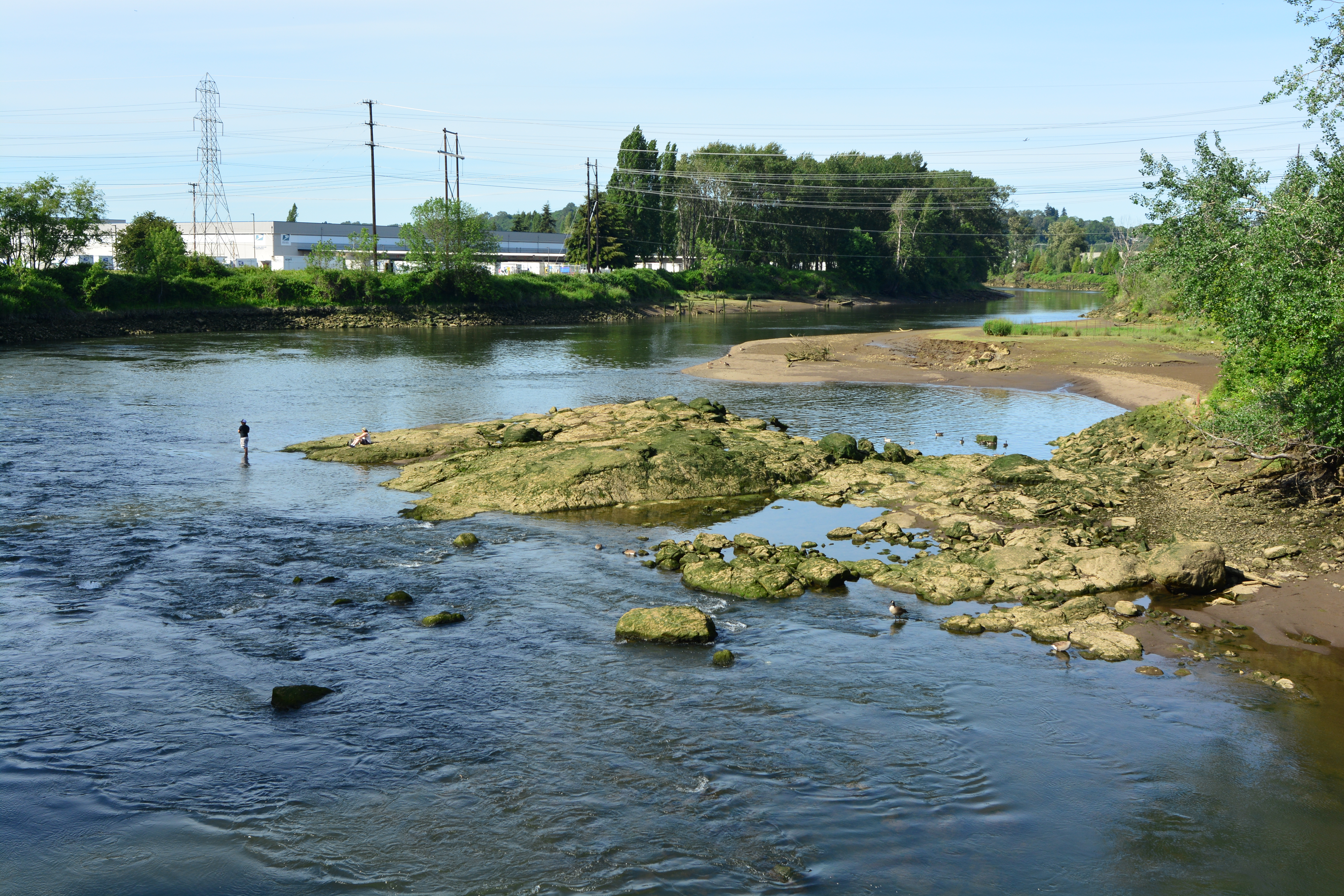
North Wind's Weir at low tide. The view here looks north from a foot-and-bicycle bridge on the Green River Trail.

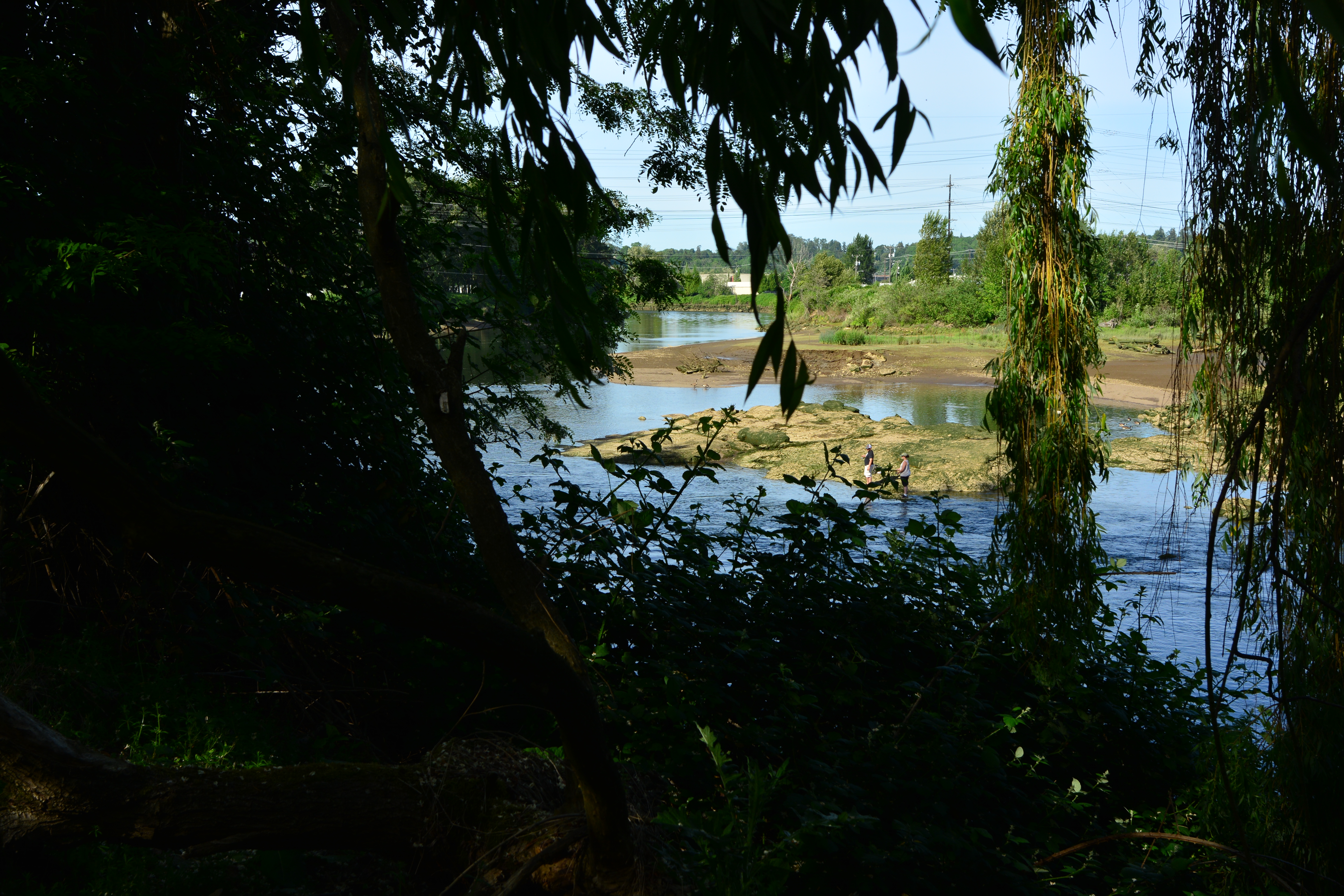
Seen here from Cecil Moses Memorial Park on the west bank of the Duwamish

North Wind's Weir or North Wind's Fish Weir south of Seattle on the Duwamish River in Tukwila, Washington is a site that figures prominently in the oral traditions of the Salish people of the Puget Sound region. The legends describe battles between North Wind and South Wind for control of the region.

== Salish tradition ==
According to Salish tradition, North Wind stretched a weir of ice across the Duwamish River at this site; no fish could pass, starving the people up the valley, the people of the Chinook Wind who was married to North Wind's daughter Mountain Beaver Woman. The mother of Mountain Beaver woman survived the starvation, but retreated to the mountain. Mountain Beaver Woman's son, the child Storm Wind, also survived.

The people of the North Wind warned Storm Wind to stay away from the mountain, trying to keep from him the knowledge of what had happened to his people, but eventually he defied them and found his grandmother living in misery. He heard her story and helped her out of her misery; she, in return, aided him with a flood that shattered the weir and turned it to stone. Storm Wind and his grandmother defeated North Wind, who only occasionally and briefly torments the area with snow and ice.

== Location and environs ==
North Wind's Weir is just east of Cecil Moses Memorial Park, in a zone where fresh and salt waters mix, creating a key transition zone for young Chinook salmon swimming downstream to Puget Sound. A pedestrian and bicycle bridge coming out of the park on the Green River Trail crosses the Duwamish River just south of the weir, allowing a view of the rock formation in the river, except when there is a high tide. The United States Army Corps of Engineers, King County, and construction contractor Doyon Project Services completed a habitat restoration project at the site in December 2009, restoring 2.5 acres (1.0 hectare) of mudflat and vegetated marsh.
