= Black River (Washington) =

There are two waterways called the Black River in Washington state:

- Black River (Duwamish River tributary)
- Black River (Chehalis River tributary)
