= Boeing Plant 2 =

Defunct Boeing factory building

Coordinates: 47°31′49.01″N 122°18′40.32″W

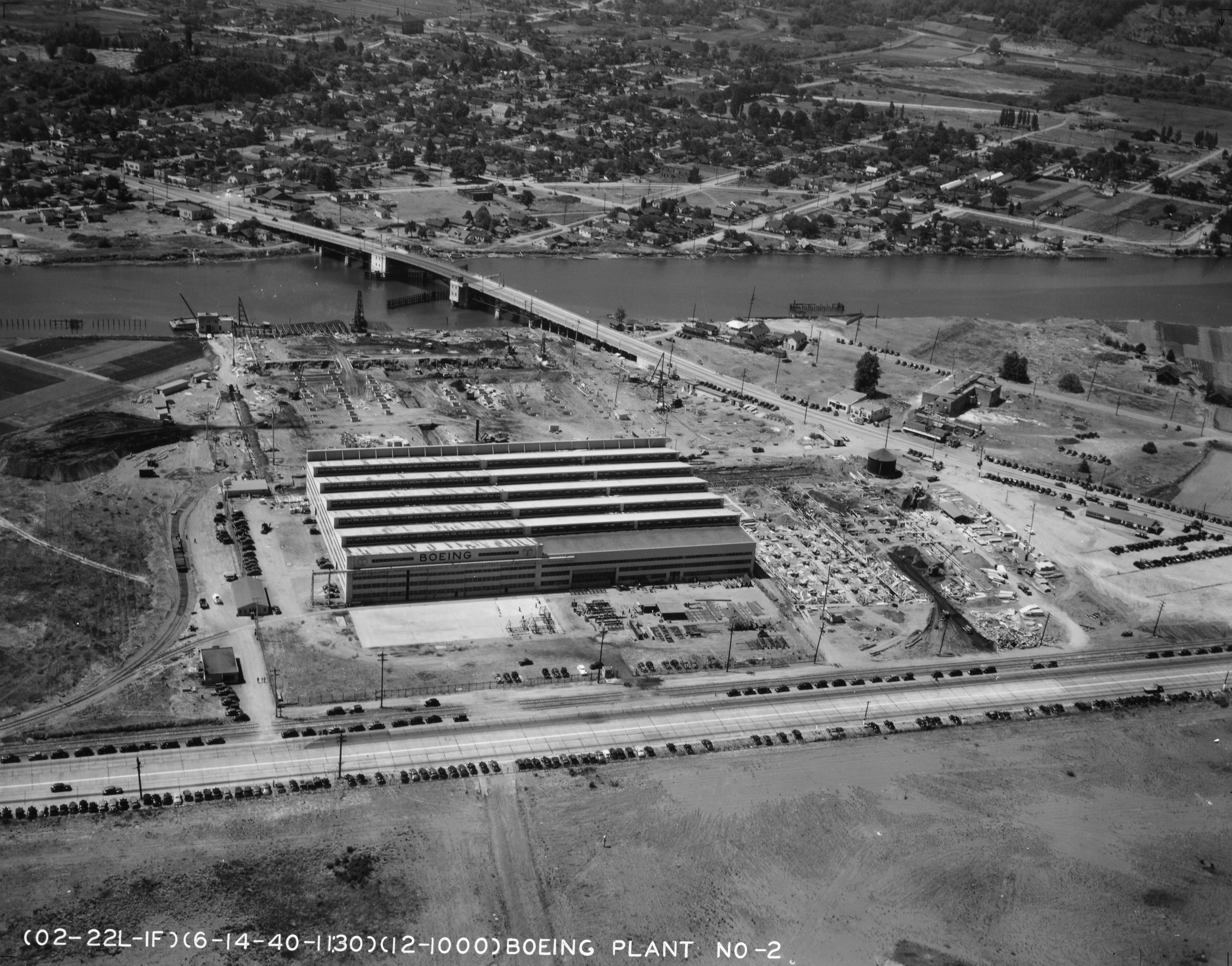
- Aerial photo of Boeing Plant 2 dated June 14, 1940
- Built: 1936
- Location: Seattle, Washington, U.S.
- Products: Boeing B-17 Flying Fortress; Boeing 307 Stratoliner; Boeing B-29 Superfortress; Boeing B-50 Superfortress; B-47 Stratojet; Boeing 377; B-52 Stratofortress; Boeing 737

Boeing Plant 2 (also known as Air Force Plant 17) was a factory building which was built in 1936 by The Boeing Company in Seattle, Washington, United States. By the time production ceased in the building, the plant had built half of the Boeing B-17 Flying Fortresses, the Boeing 307 Stratoliners, the Boeing 377s, some of the Boeing B-29 Superfortresses, Boeing B-50 Superfortresses, B-47 Stratojets, B-52 Stratofortresses, and the initial Boeing 737s. It was located between the Duwamish River and Boeing Field, to the east of the 16th Avenue South Bridge, facing East Marginal Way South.

== History ==
In the 1930s, it became apparent that Boeing Plant 1, located right down the river, was rendered obsolete in Boeing's transition from producing small wood/fabric seaplanes to larger all-metal land aircraft. Plant 2 was built as a modern assembly line where metal airframe components could be fabricated and assembled in the same facility and completed aircraft would have access to an airfield. In 1936, the plant was finished with a goal to build early prototypes of the B-17 Flying Fortress and the Boeing 307 Stratoliners. At this time the floor was 60,000 square feet (5,600 m^{2}). 600,000 square feet (56,000 m^{2}) was added to the plant in May 1940 to support Boeing production of 380 Douglas DB-7 light bombers. By the time of the Japanese attack on Pearl Harbor, the plant had been expanded to 1,776,000 square feet (165,000 m^{2}). In total, 6,981 B-17s were produced in Plant 2.

To hide the factory from possible aerial attack, the U.S. Army Corps of Engineers built houses of plywood and fabric and installed fake streets to camouflage the roof. The idea was to blend the facility into the surrounding neighborhood across the river. This elaborate pretend town was nicknamed the "Boeing Wonderland" by the Seattle Daily Times on July 23, 1945. Later in the war, the first three B-29 Superfortress were built in the facility. While B-29s were built by Boeing in Renton, Washington, and Wichita, Kansas, a Bell plant at Marietta, Georgia, and a Martin plant at Omaha, Nebraska, sub assemblies were produced in Plant 2 and shipped to the Renton plant. All 370 of the follow-on aircraft, the Boeing B-50 Superfortress, were built in Plant 2. In addition, 56 Boeing 377 airliners were built in the plant.

In the late 1940s, the first two B-47 Stratojets, the first swept-wing bombers, were built at the plant. During the 1950s, 278 B-52 Stratofortresses were also built in the facility. Due to the roof being thirty-five feet high, early jets had a hinge on their tail to fit inside the building since their tails were 48 feet (15 m) high. B-52 production was consolidated in Wichita, Kansas in 1958, ending the era of regular aircraft assembly at the plant.

In the 1960s the first three Boeing 737s were assembled in Plant 2, but finished in the neighboring Thompson Site. The Thompson Site was then used to produce another 268 737s. Production of the 737 was moved to the Boeing Renton Factory in 1970, where production continues to this day.

In the 1980s, the plant was used as a machine shop but that discontinued as work shifted to more modern facilities. The National Air and Space Museum's Boeing 367-80 and the museum's Boeing 307 were restored in the facility in 1990–2002. The Museum of Flight's Boeing B-17F and Boeing B-29 were restored in Plant 2 and the museum's Lockheed Super Constellation was stored in the facility. A Douglas World Cruiser reproduction project was also underway in the plant. All remaining aircraft were removed from Plant 2 on September 18, 2010.

Eventually the main building fell into decay due to lack of adequate maintenance and earthquakes. Broken water mains sometimes flooded the tunnels which led to other buildings on the site. Demolition began in late 2010. Satellite buildings remain operational and on the footprint of the old plant are large tarmac lots for automobiles and airplanes. Under an agreement with both state and federal governments as well as local Native American tribes, the company restored more than five acres (2 ha) of wetlands along the Duwamish River.

== Notable workers ==
In 1940, Joe Sutter took a summer job at the plant while studying aeronautical engineering at the University of Washington. He eventually ended up becoming the "father of the 747".
