= Black River (Duwamish River tributary) =

River in the United States

Coordinates: 47°28′27″N 122°15′3″W

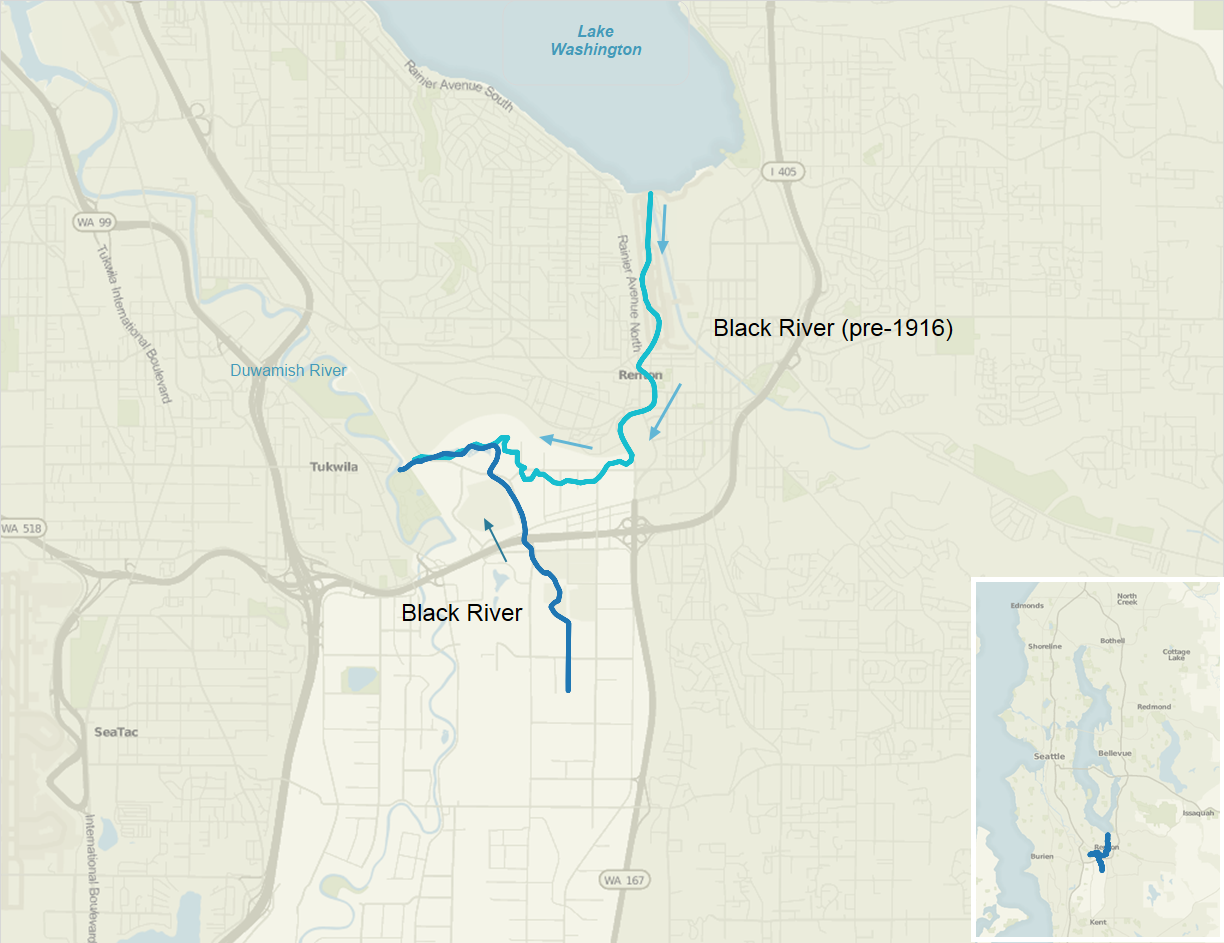
Pre-1916 and current courses of the Black River

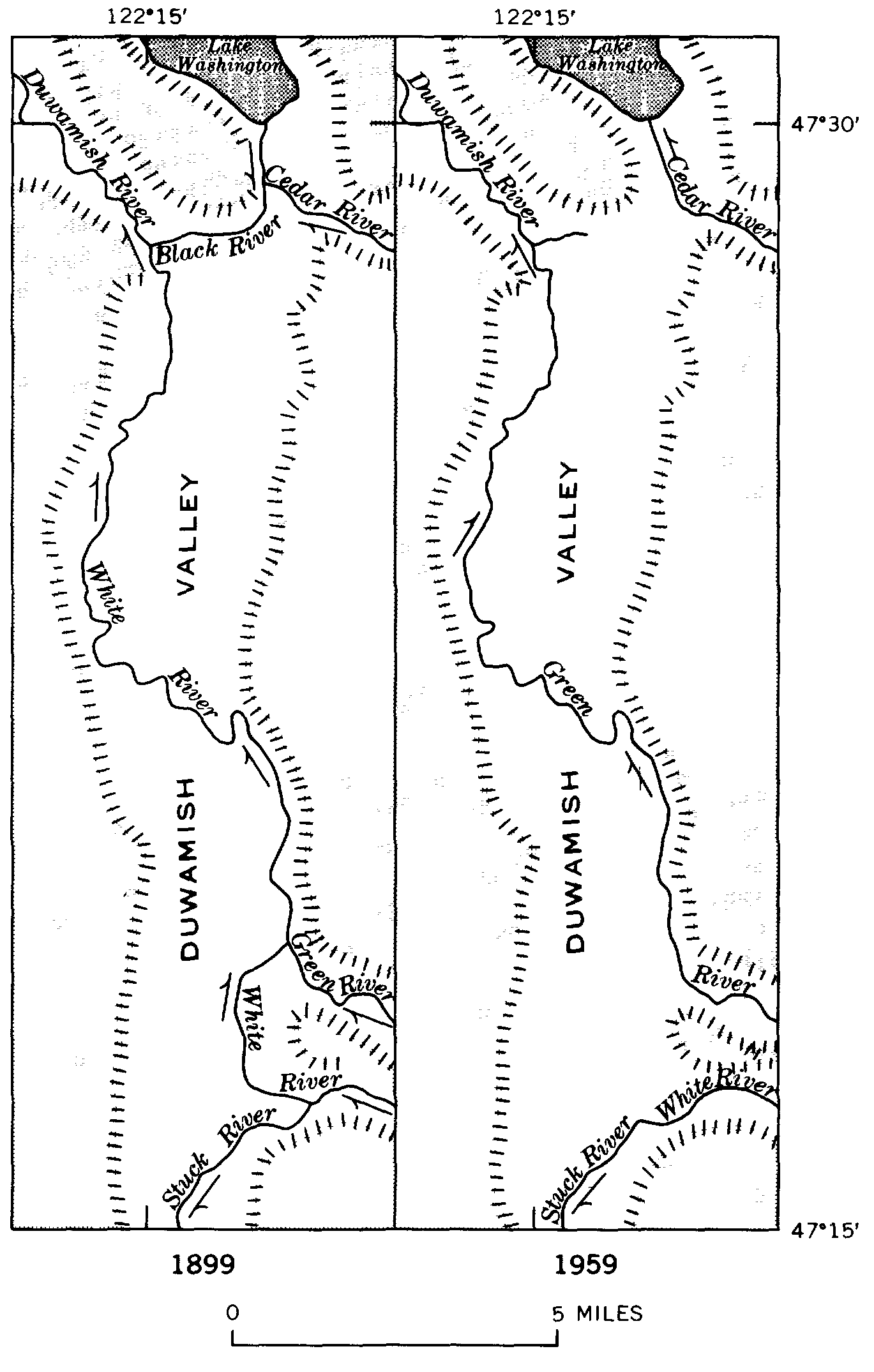
Maps showing the changes of course and nomenclature of rivers in the Duwamish Valley, 1899-1959.

The Black River is a tributary of the Duwamish River in King County in the U.S. state of Washington. It drained Lake Washington until 1916, when the opening of the Lake Washington Ship Canal lowered the lake, causing part of the Black River to dry up. It still exists as a dammed stream about 2 miles (3.2 km) long.

Before the 20th century, Lake Washington emptied from its south end into the Black River, which was joined by the Cedar River before meeting the White River (now the lower Green River; the White River has been diverted south). The confluence of the Black and White rivers created the Duwamish River, which emptied into Elliott Bay in Puget Sound. Thus, the water of rivers emptying into Lake Washington, such as the Sammamish River, once flowed through the Black and Duwamish rivers. Today, Lake Washington's water empties into Puget Sound via the Lake Washington Ship Canal.

In November 1911, the Cedar River flooded Renton. In 1912, the Cedar was diverted from the Black River into Lake Washington to avoid future floods. Its water still flowed through the Black after passing through Lake Washington. In 1916, with the opening of the Lake Washington Ship Canal in Seattle, the lake's level dropped nearly nine feet and the Black River dried up. Today, part of its bed forms the Black River Riparian Forest and Wetland.

The Duwamish people lived along the Black River for many centuries. Duwamish settlements remained along the river until it dried up in 1916. Several indigenous villages were located near the confluence of the Black and Duwamish rivers. The area was called "Inside Place" (Lushootseed: Dx^{w}dəw, from which comes the word "Duwamish"), referring to its location inland from Puget Sound. Long used as a place of refuge, the area became home to hundreds of natives displaced by the growing city of Seattle. The Black River was also a big fishery for the Duwamish people, until the river dried up.

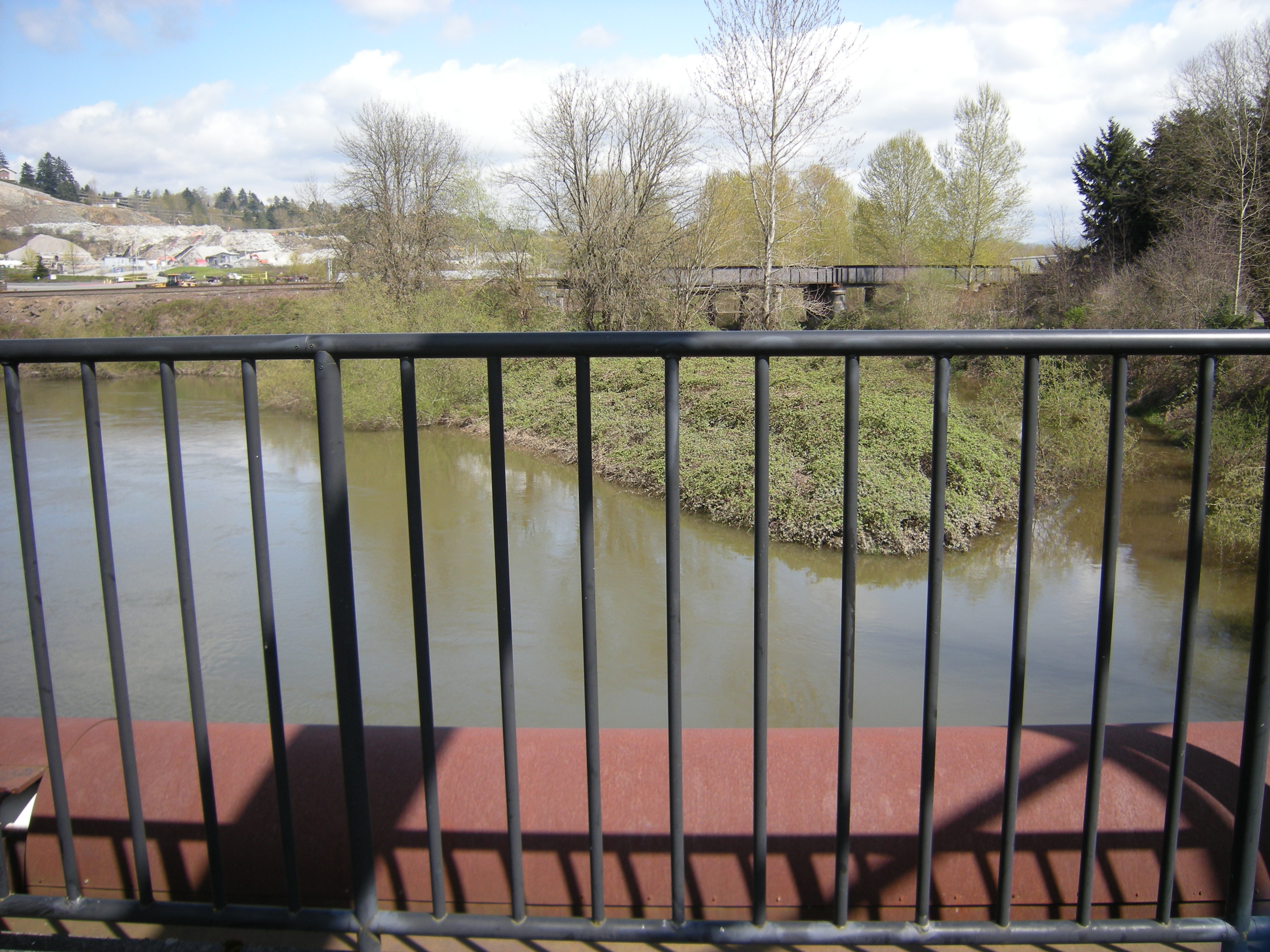
The remnant of the Black River (at right) joins Green River to form the Duwamish (at left). Seen from the Fort Dent Pedestrian Bridge, 2009. This image looks upstream on the Black River and downstream on the Duwamish.

== See also ==
- Fort Dent
- List of rivers in Washington
