= Duwamish Number 1 Site =

Archaeological site in Washington, US

- U.S. National Register of Historic Places
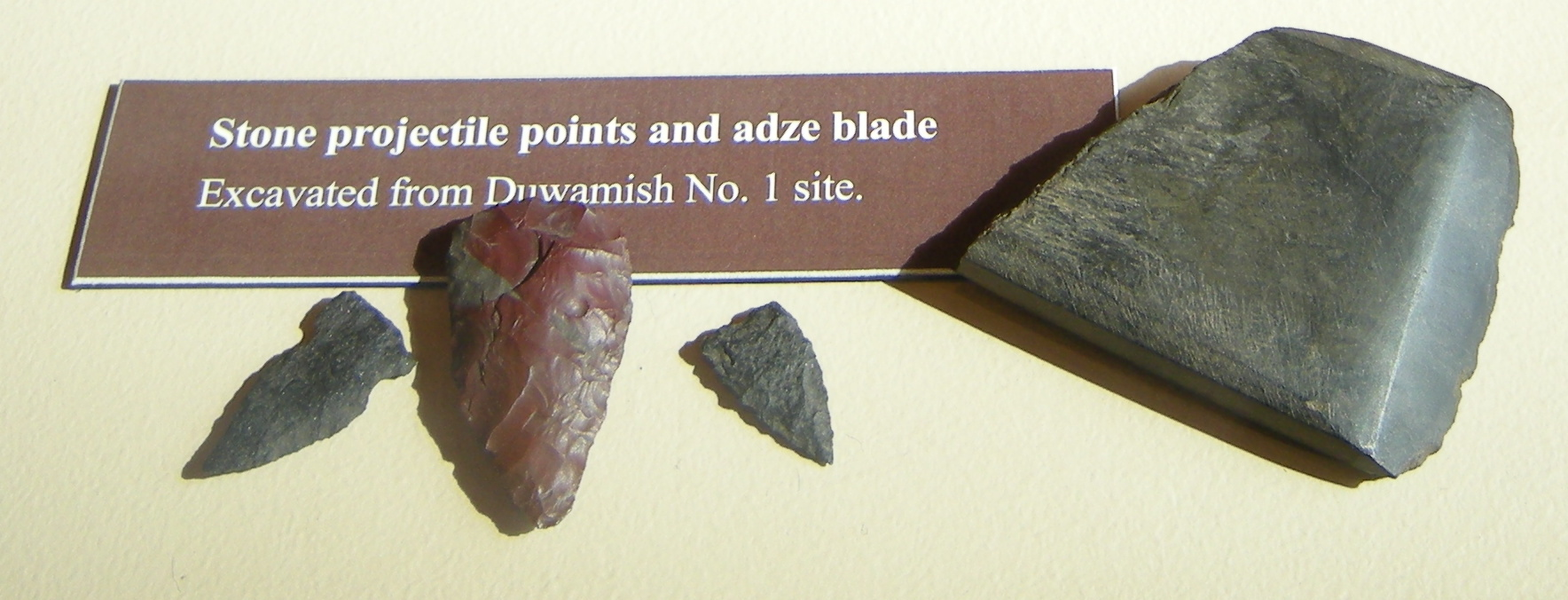
- Nearest city: Seattle, Washington
- NRHP reference No.: 77001338
- Added to NRHP: October 18, 1977

The Duwamish Number 1 Site, also known as 45KI23, is an archaeological site on the only remaining original stretch of Duwamish River in Seattle, Washington discovered by David Munsell, an archaeologist employed by the U.S. Army Corps of Engineers, in November 1975. It is adjacent to the site of the Duwamish Longhouse and Cultural Center (DLCC).

== History ==
The site was a shell midden and village between 670 and 1700 CE, comprising four separate eras of occupation over nearly 1,000 years. The earliest material found at the site dates to around 80 BCE. The researchers also found remains of ducks and large mammals like deer and elk in the midden. It is believed to comprise the remains of the village həʔapus ('where there are horse clams'), also called yəlíqʷad ('basket cap') at an earlier date in Lushootseed. According to Duwamish tribal elders, this village was home to hundreds of Duwamish living in several longhouses in the nineteenth century. In the latter period of inhabitation, from 1740 to 1840, the midden demonstrates the presence of broken glass and chinaware fragments, indicating significant contact and trade with white European settlers.

== Excavation ==
The site was excavated by archaeologists in 1978, and again in 1986.

The site is owned by the Port of Seattle, which has set the site aside for public access as həʔapus Village Park and Shoreline Habitat. The Duwamish Longhouse and Cultural Center (DLCC), owned and operated by the Duwamish Tribe, is now situated across Marginal Way from the archaeological site.

== See also ==
- History of the Duwamish tribe
- National Register of Historic Places listings in King County, Washington

== Sources ==
- Williams, David B. (2005). The Street-Smart Naturalist: Field Notes from Seattle, Graphic Arts Center Publishing Co.
