= Fort Dent =

Historic fort and current park in Tukwalia, WA

Coordinates: 47°28′0.1″N 122°14′53″W

- Tukwila, Washington, United States

Site information
- Type: Military installation
- Controlled by: United States Army

Location
- Location of Fort Dent Fort Dent (the United States)

Site history
- Built: 1856
- In use: 1856–1876

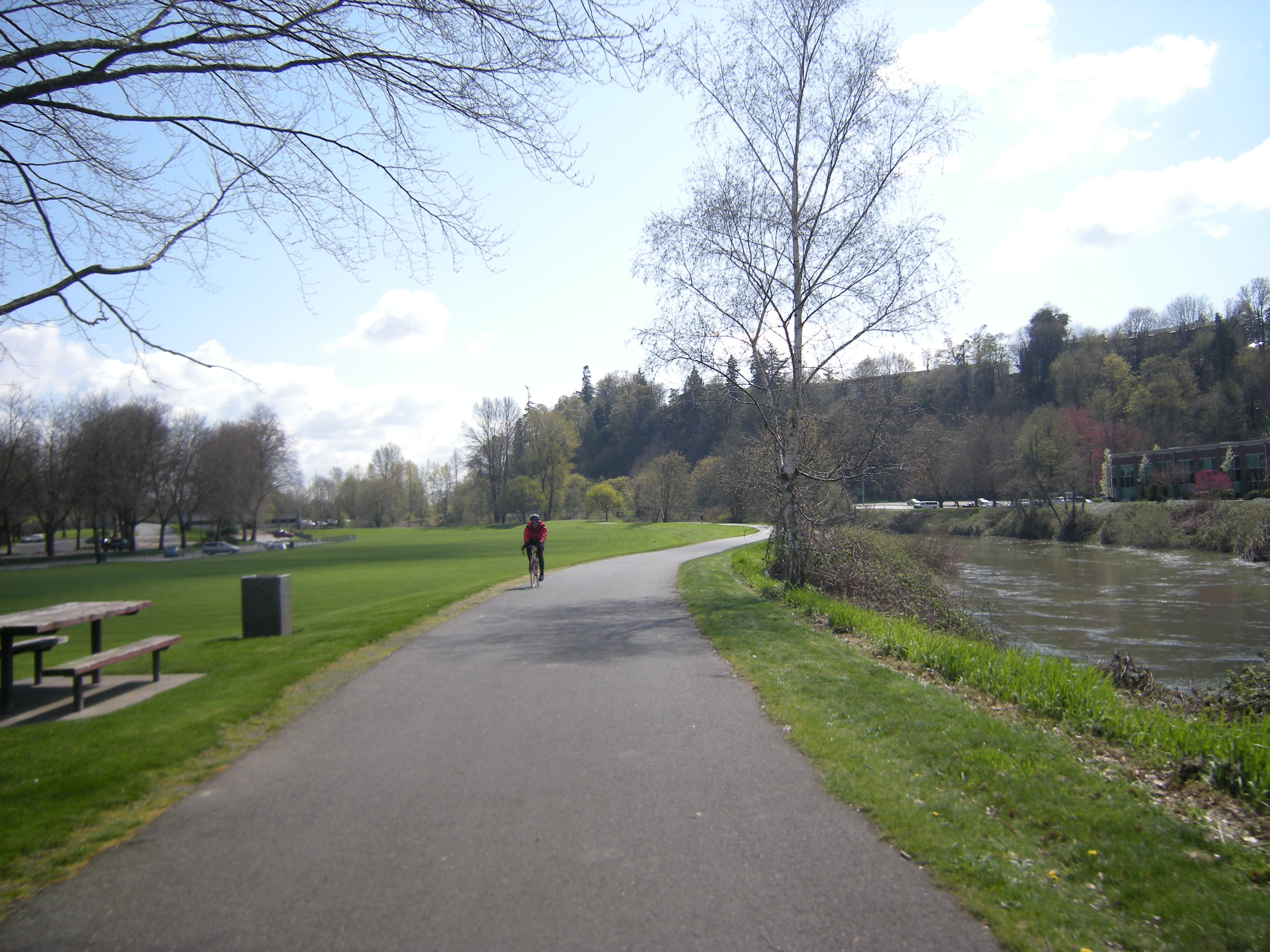
Bicycle approaching on Green River Trail as it passes through Fort Dent Park. This is looking upstream on the right bank of the Green River.

Fort Dent is a historic fort and present-day park in Tukwila, Washington.

== History ==
Fort Dent was a blockhouse built on the orders of Territorial Governor, Isaac Stevens, in approximately 1860. It was located southeast of the confluence of the Black and Green Rivers, which join to form the Duwamish River. It was named for General Frederick Tracy Dent, the brother-in-law of Ulysses S. Grant.

Previously the land had been occupied by the Duwamish tribe, but had been partially vacated after the signing of the Point Elliot Treaty in 1855.

Today, the site is occupied by Fort Dent Park and the Starfire Sports Complex, with fields for softball, soccer, and occasionally rugby union games, as well as a 4,500 seat soccer stadium. It became a park of King County, Washington, in 1968, and in 2003 was acquired by the City of Tukwila, its current owner. The non-profit Starfire Sports operates the sports complex on the site under a 40-year agreement with the city.
