= Duwamish River =

Coordinates: 47°35′04″N 122°21′37″W

- Duwamish Waterway in southern Seattle, 2018

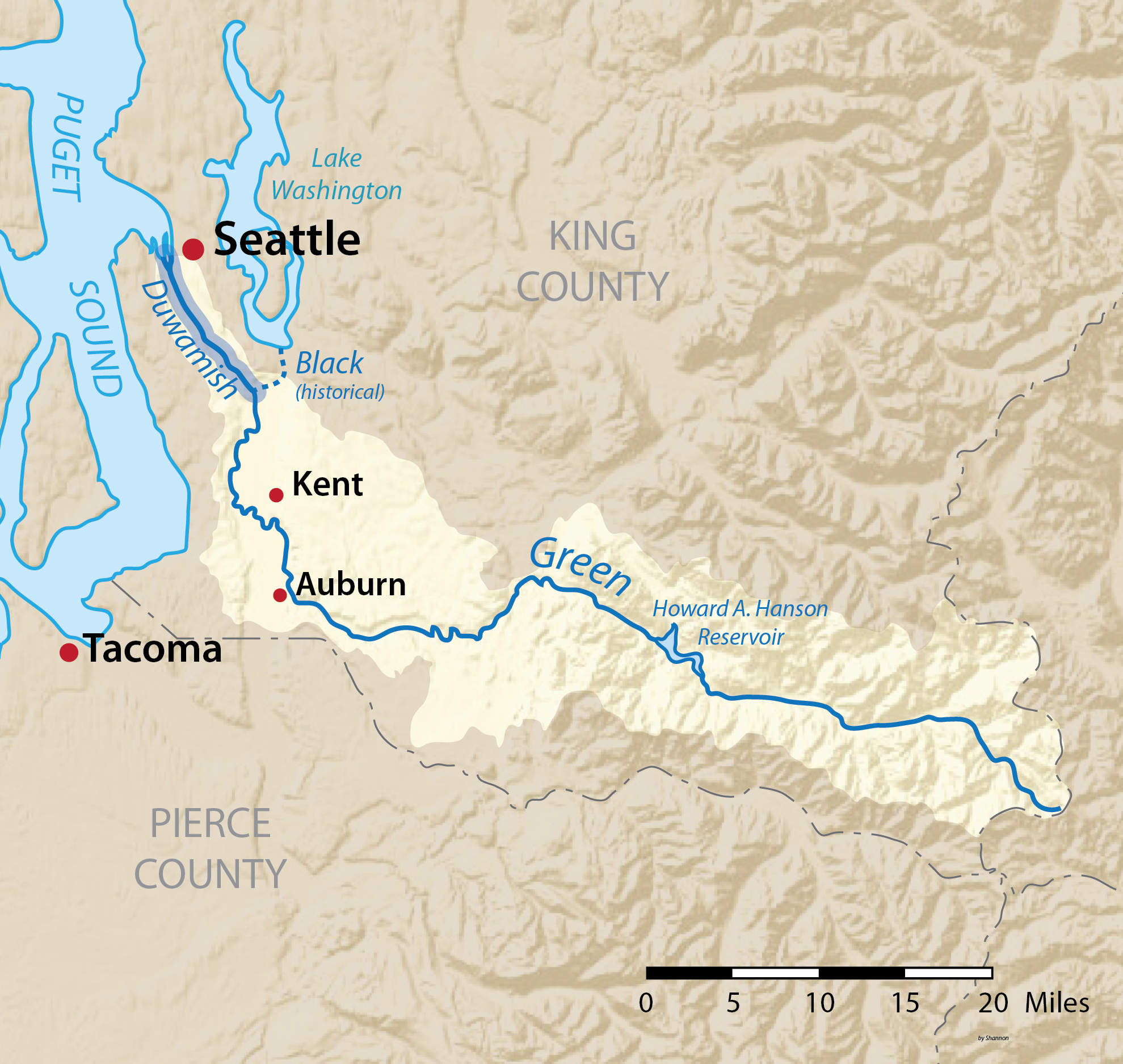
- Map of the Duwamish/Green River watershed with the Duwamish highlighted

Location
- Country: United States
- State: Washington
- Cities: Seattle, Tukwila

Physical characteristics
- Source: Confluence of Green River and Black River
  - location: Fort Dent Park, Tukwila, Washington
- Mouth: Elliott Bay
  - location: Seattle, Washington
- Length: 11 mi (18 km)

Basin features
- Tributaries
  - left: Longfellow Creek, Hamm Creek

The Duwamish River runs north for about 11 miles (18 km) through the cities of Tukwila and Seattle in the US state of Washington before emptying into Elliott Bay on the Puget Sound. Historically, the river formed from the confluence of the White and Black rivers in what is now Renton, but human modifications in the early 20th century led it to become the lower portion of the Green River. During the Last Glacial Period, the Duwamish Valley was carved out by glacial meltwater from the advancing Cordilleran ice sheet, forming what was initially an inlet of Puget Sound, which was later filled by the eruption of Mount Rainier and the Osceola Mudflow around 5,600 years ago.

Lushootseed-speaking Coast Salish peoples, including the eponymous Duwamish people, occupied the region for thousands of years prior to colonization. Euro-American settlement began in the 1850s, and many Duwamish were forced to leave the region after the 1855 Treaty of Point Elliott. Industrial development in the growing city of Seattle led to various efforts to reclaim land in the river's broad mudflats, culminating in the construction of Harbor Island and the channelization of the river into the Duwamish Waterway during the early 20th century. During this period, the White River was diverted away from the Duwamish, and the construction of the Lake Washington Ship Canal cut off the river from the Lake Washington watershed, greatly lessening its flow. The area around the Duwamish Waterway was extensively industrialized during the 20th century, supporting industries such as ship and airplane manufacture. Extensive shoreline modifications such as bulkheads, piers, wharves and sheet pile retaining walls were installed across the river, resulting in limited natural habitat.

The Duwamish has been subject to restoration and cleanup efforts since the late 20th century, and was declared a federal Superfund site in 2001. The river continues to serve as a habitat for various fish (including several species of salmon), birds, and invertebrates. Although much of the watershed consists of commercial and industrial property, it contains some residential neighborhoods and various parks, allowing for recreational use of the river.

== Name ==
The Lushootseed term dxʷdəw, 'the inside', refers to the inland region centered on the confluence of the Duwamish, Black, Cedar and Green rivers. dxʷdəw was a major center of settlement, with multiple towns. dxʷdəw may have initially been the name of a single village in the region. The Duwamish people (dxʷdəwʔabš, 'people of the inside') take their name from this region. Euro-American settlers named the river after the Duwamish in the early 19th century. Early variant spellings for the river included Dewampsh, D'Wamish, and Dwamish.

== Course ==
=== Historic (pre-1906) ===
Prior to the rerouting efforts of the early 20th century, the Duwamish River formed from the confluence of the White and Black rivers. The Black River drained Lake Washington into the Duwamish. During this period, the Duwamish and its tributaries had a drainage basin covering 1,640 square miles (4,250 km^{2}).

Small tributary creeks flowed into the lower Duwamish as it proceeded through various meanders down the Duwamish Valley, before opening into salt marshes near the delta. The delta's mudflats stretched into Elliott Bay, encompassing most of the modern reclaimed land around the bay.

=== Present ===
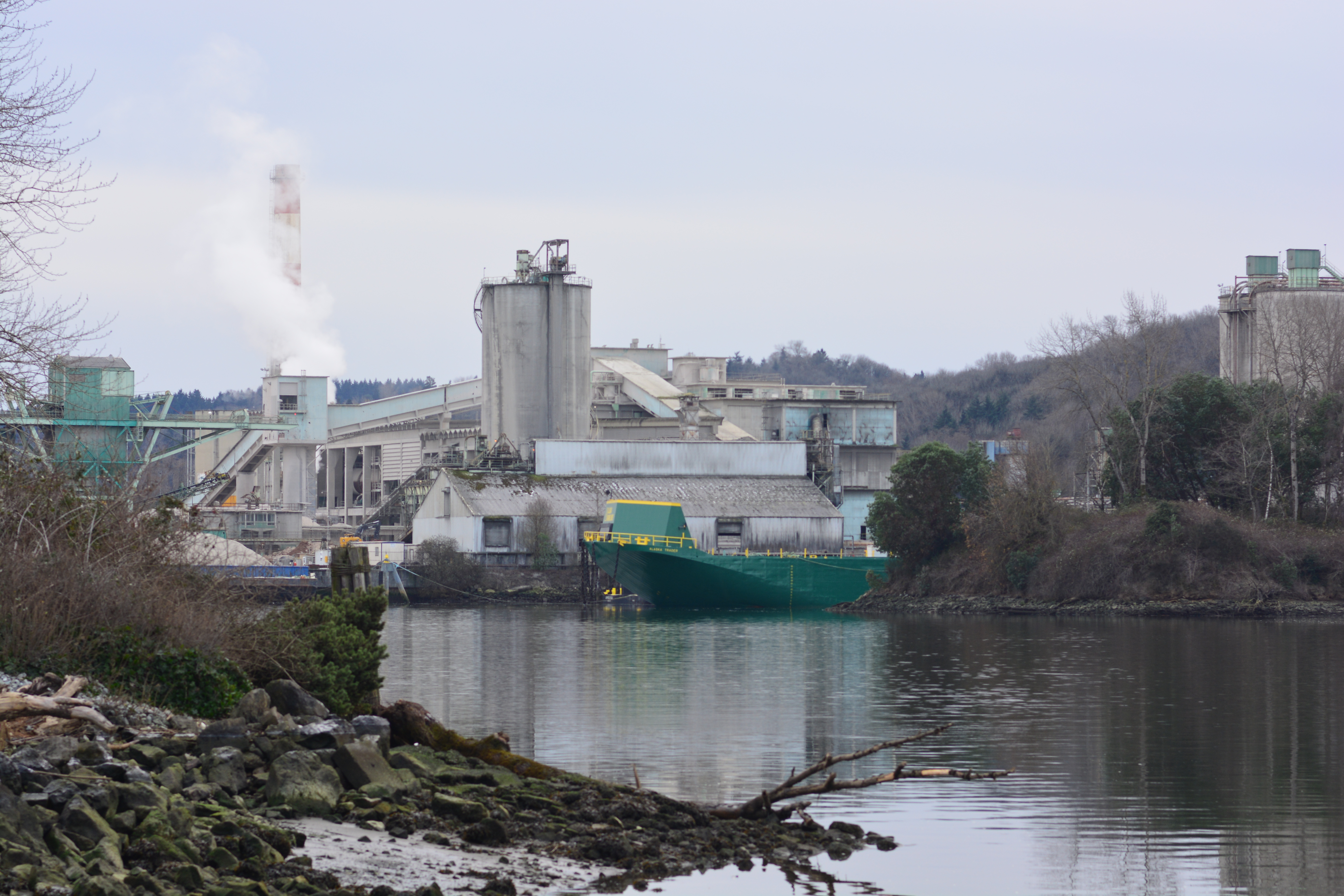
A cement plant along the Duwamish River

In its present course, the Duwamish is the tidally-influenced lower 11 miles (18 km) of the Green River. The Green River becomes the Duwamish at the confluence with the remnants of the Black River in Fort Dent Park, Tukwila. It flows northwest through Tukwila, before broadening into the Duwamish Waterway shortly before entering Seattle city limits adjacent to Boeing Field. Just south of the city limits, Hamm Creek drains into the waterway from the west. The waterway splits into east and west channels on either side of the artificial Harbor Island before reaching Elliott Bay. A small stream, Longfellow Creek, drains into the west channel.

==== Bridges ====
Going upstream from the river's source, a small pedestrian bridge crosses the river at the Foster Golf Course. 56th Avenue S, Interstate 5, 42nd Ave S, East Marginal Way, and Tukwila International Boulevard cross the river in Tukwila, alongside a pedestrian bridge at S 119th St. Straddling the city limits of Seattle is the South Park Bridge. Within the city itself are the First Avenue South Bridge and West Seattle Bridge. The Spokane Street Swing Bridge spans the western channel of the Duwamish Waterway, connecting Harbor Island to West Seattle.

== Watershed ==
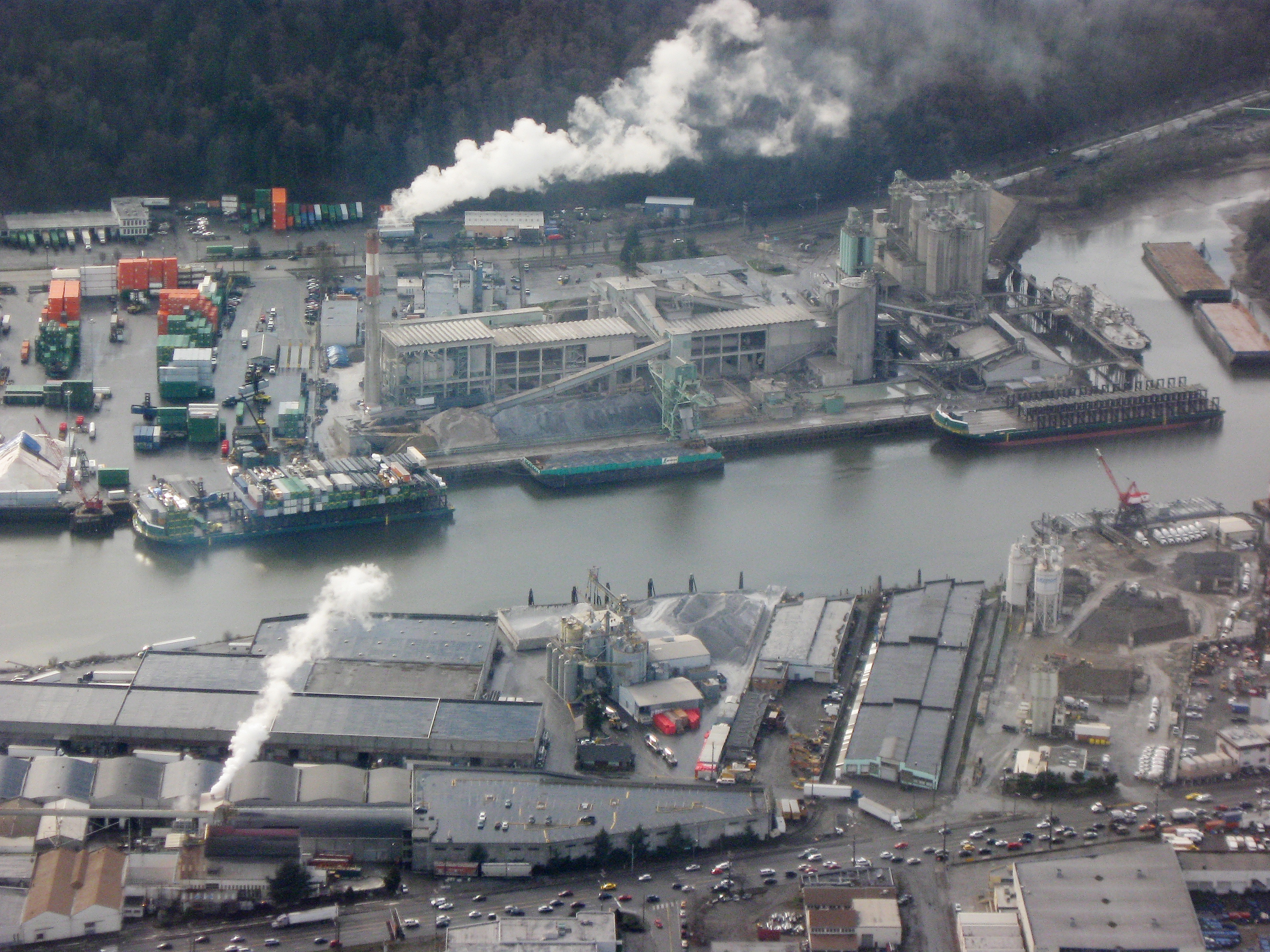
Industry along the Duwamish, 2009

The Green and Duwamish Rivers have a combined drainage basin covering 566 square miles (1,466 km^{2}), including portions of Seattle, Tukwila, SeaTac, Renton, Federal Way, Auburn, Black Diamond, and Enumclaw, as well as various forested unincorporated areas across south-central King County.

The Puget Sound region has a marine climate, with cool moist air from the Pacific allowing for moderate temperatures during the summer and winter. Monthly temperatures at nearby Seattle–Tacoma International Airport average 40 to 43 °F (4 to 6 °C) during the winter and 60 to 65 °F (16 to 18 °C) during the summer. The majority of precipitation falls between October and January, with a total annual average of about 38 inches (970 mm).

=== Hydrology ===
Prior to large-scale modification, the flow rate of the Duwamish averaged about 2,500 to 9,000 cubic feet (71 to 255 m^{3}) per second throughout the year. During floods, this rate could increase to 15,000 to 30,000 cubic feet (420 to 850 m^{3}) per second. The Howard A. Hanson Dam was constructed on the upper Green River in 1961 to control floods and ensure a more consistent water level in the river, decreasing the peak flow rates of the Duwamish. However, the periodic release of water from the dam has increased moderate flow rates to about 3,920 to 6,460 cubic feet (111 to 183 m^{3}) per second.

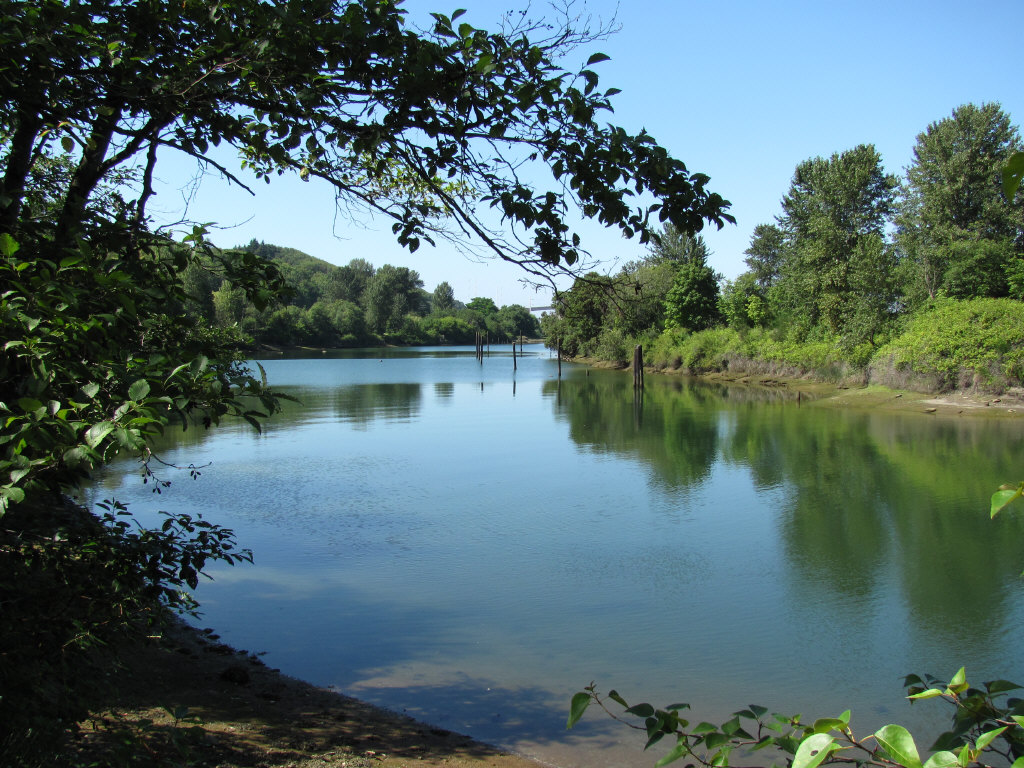
The river from the Duwamish River Trail, 2010

The riverbanks of the upper Duwamish are generally 9 to 13 feet (3 to 4 m) higher in elevation than the portions of the floodplain closest to the valley escarpments. The banks of the lower Duwamish descend from the rest of the valley, forming a terrace level. The lower waterway is influenced by both freshwater from the Duwamish-Green system and tidal flows of saltwater from Elliott Bay. A saltwater intrusion can extend up to 2.8 to 4.8 miles (4.5 to 7.7 km) upstream from the mouth, increasing the river's turbulence and resuspending sediments in the water.

About 420 acres (170 ha) of tidal marshland once covered the area between Kellogg Island and the mudflats on Elliott Bay. Constrained by the terraces along the floodplain, the tidal marsh was about 2,300 feet (700 m) wide at its narrowest. The marshland was mainly spread across two main river islands, alongside various smaller islands and a small region on the northern coast of the mudflats. Kellogg is a remnant of the largest of these islands. Two lobes of primarily freshwater marshland (periodically inundated by the tides) stretched inland along the river, covering roughly 420 acres (170 ha). An additional 494 acres (200 ha) of freshwater marshland was present in depressions along the floodplain.

River modification and surrounding construction has erased most of the Duwamish's former mudflats and estuary. The United States Army Corps of Engineers maintains a federal navigation channel along the lower portion of the river, dredging up to around 4.7 miles (7.6 km) from the mouth to ensure the waterway is deep enough for ships to navigate. The majority of the shoreline along the lower Duwamish is used for industrial and commercial purposes, with extensive shoreline modifications such as bulkheads, piers, wharves, sheet pile retaining walls and banks armored with riprap. Only pockets of natural habitat remain in the waterway, mostly limited to small, shallow intertidal benches.

=== Water quality ===
Storm drains and sanitary systems across much of southern Seattle and adjacent municipalities feed into the lower Duwamish. Pollutants in these sources include metal, polycyclic aromatic hydrocarbons, polychlorinated biphenyl, dioxins, phthalates, and various other organic compounds, posing a risk to humans and wildlife. These sources account for only about 1% of the sediment entering the waterway, but have a far higher concentration of contaminants than sources further upstream.

== Biology ==
A 1995 survey found 33 resident and seasonal fish species in the lower Duwamish waterway. Salmon runs of various species traverse the Duwamish to access Green River spawning grounds. Chinook, chum, and coho salmon are the most common, although pink and sockeye salmon are rarely found. Steelhead and cutthroat trout are found in the river, with occasional instances of bull trout. Chinook and chum juveniles often reside in the Duwamish estuary, although they may be threatened by river lamprey. Spring chinook and sockeye salmon runs in the Duwamish greatly declined over the twentieth century, likely due to the river's rerouting.

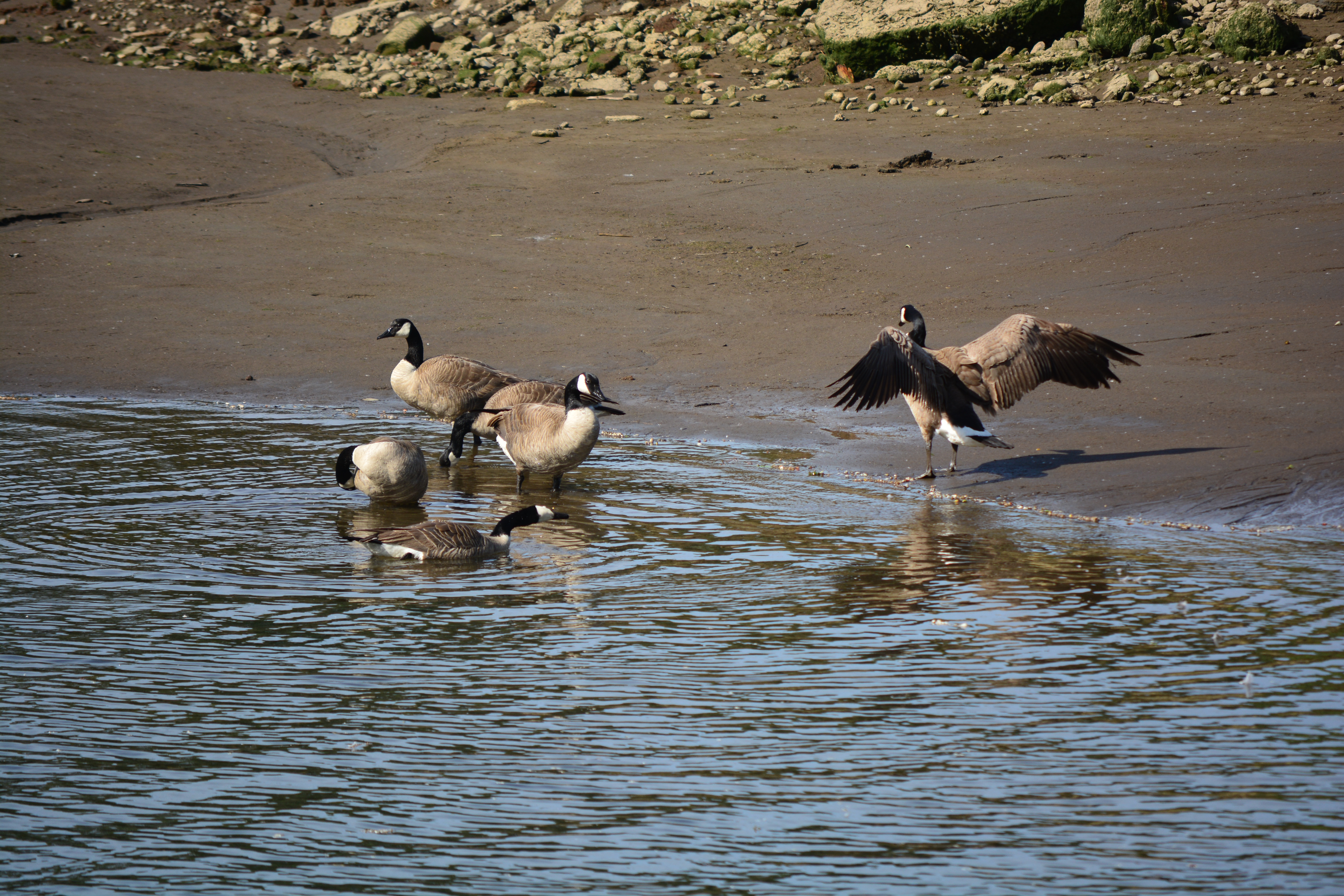
A group of Canada geese on the banks of the Duwamish near North Wind's Weir

Shiner perch, staghorn sculpin, snake prickleback, starry flounder, and Pacific sand lance are commonly found in the river. Sculpins and flounder frequently travel a significant distance upriver, able to tolerate low salinity environments. Freshwater species in the river include redside shiner, mountain whitefish, and largescale suckers.

Benthic invertebrates such as burrowing polychaete worms and bivalves are common in the sediments of the Duwamish, while large molluscs and crustaceans such as slender crabs, Crangon shrimp, and Pandalus shrimp are commonly found on the river bottom. In the higher salinity areas closest to the mouth, dungeness crabs are found.

Birds such as the great blue herons and cormorants prey on juvenile salmon in the Duwamish estuary. Birds under federal or state protections noted in the estuary include bald eagles, common loons, common murres, merlins, peregrine falcons, and western grebes.

== Geology ==
The oldest rocks in the Duwamish valley are Eocene sedimentary rocks of the Puget Group, subdivided into the Renton and Tukwila Formations, the latter interrupted by isolated andesite sills. A separate formation of marine sedimentary rocks contains shallow-water marine fossils mixed with volcaniclastic rocks. Additional sedimentary rocks date from Oligocene in the Blakeley Formation. The Pacific coastline was once the edge of a large flat plain stretching to the Rockies, akin to the Mississippi basin. The subduction of the Juan de Fuca Plate under the North American Plate formed the Cascade Range along the coast in the late Eocene, around 36 mya (million years ago). In the late Oligocene, around 25 mya, the mountains were subject to another round of uplifting. Receiving heavy rainfall, the earliest iterations of the Cascade rivers had formed by this period, although flowed in a more northwesterly direction. The Green River likely flowed through much of the Cedar's present course during this period.

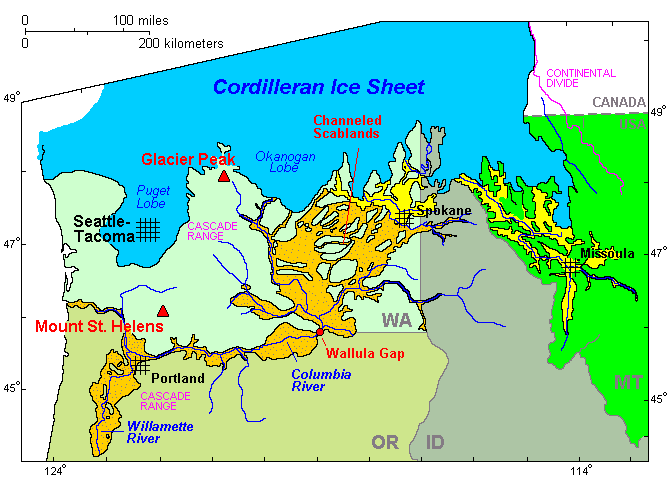
Extent of the Cordilleran ice sheet during the Missoula floods

The Puget Lowland was scoured by the expansion of the Cordilleran ice sheet during a series of six glaciations over the course of the Quaternary period. Each expansion led to the Puget Lobe, a large tongue of ice, filling the lowland region between the Cascade and Olympic ranges. The Vashon Stade, the most recent of these periods of glacial advance, lasted from c. 15,000-13,000 BCE, forming the majority of the topography of the Puget Sound. During this period, Seattle and the future Duwamish river were buried under at least 3,000 feet (900 m) of ice. The present landscape of the region sits atop several hundred meters of glacial sediment. The advancing lobe deposited a layer of glacial outwash consisting of sand and gravel. Overlying this is a dense and relatively thin layer (ranging from 3 to 30 feet (0.9 to 9 m) thick of glacial till, consisting of a poorly-sorted mixture of sand, silt, and gravel.

The Duwamish Valley was scoured by glacial meltwater from the Cordilleran ice sheet. A large freshwater lake, fed by the meltwater, formed in the southern Puget Sound as the ice retreated following the glacial maximum. Recessional outwash was deposited atop the channels, consisting of coarser outcroppings on either edge of the valley, and finer lacustrine deposits along the central portions of the valley. By c. 12,900 BCE, the Puget Lobe had retreated northward to the Strait of Juan de Fuca, allowing seawater to fill the basin. This was offset by significant post-glacial rebound of up to 650 feet (200 m) in the northern lowlands, which was partially overcome by a 300 feet (90 m) sea level rise over the succeeding millennia.

Following these rise of sea levels, a large inlet of the Puget Sound occupied what would later become the Duwamish, stretching to the present location of Auburn. Marine shells have been found in fossil deposits in the Duwamish valley, including barnacles and molluscs such as mussels, periwinkles, and limpets. The Green River formed a delta on the southeastern bank of the inlet. Further inland, the Puyallup split into two distributaries, flowing alternatively into deltas at the Duwamish and Puyallup inlets. Around 3700 BCE, a large lahar known as the Osceola Mudflow erupted from the collapsing northeastern flank of Mount Rainier, filling the two inlets with volcanic debris.

Late Holocene geologic formations in the region feature a significant portion of alluvial deposits alongside lahar sediment. Following the Osceola Mudflow, significant progradation (delta growth) and aggradation (vertical accumulation of sediment) occurred. The Duwamish delta advanced at a rate of roughly 21 feet (6.4 m) a year following the mudflow, alongside aggradation from periodic smaller landslides and lahars from Mount Rainier. Alluvial deposits in the Duwamish Valley vary from tens to hundreds of feet in thickness, generally thinning towards the south. Surface alluvial deposits directly along the river are younger than those along the broader valley, which were deposited while the valley was still flooded by seawater.

== History ==
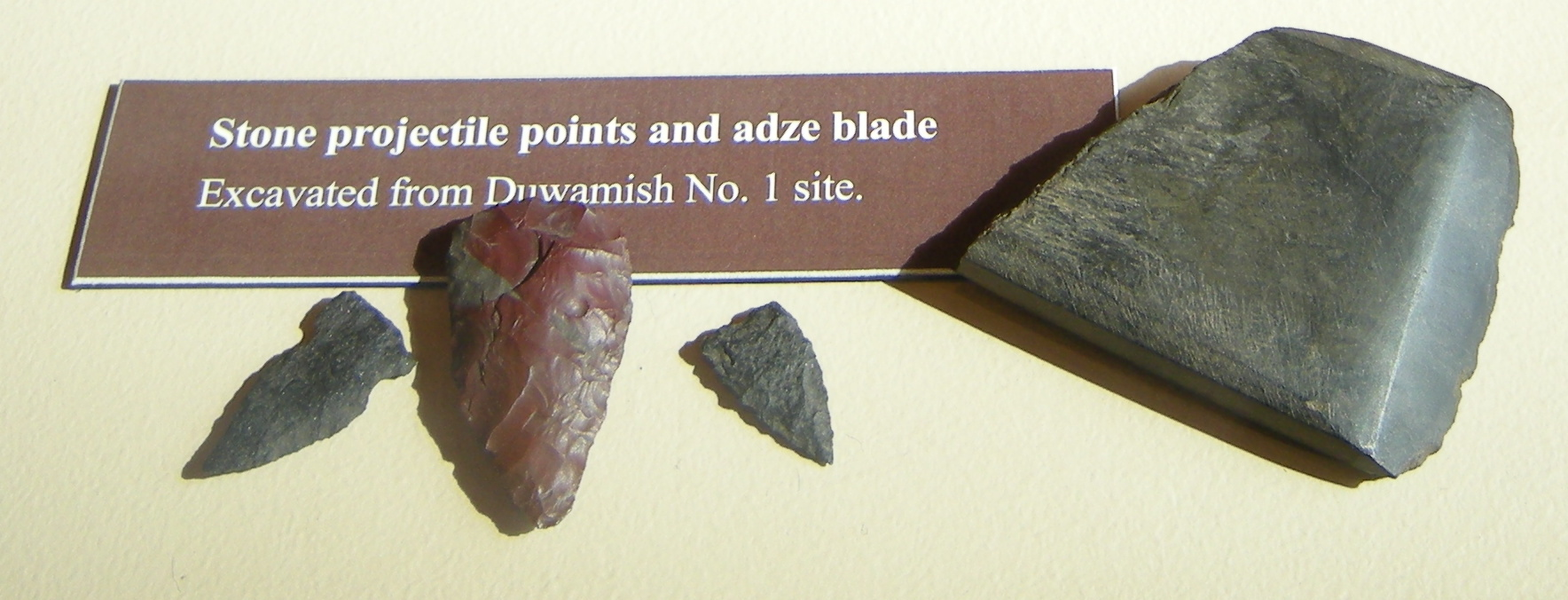
Native American stone tools from the Duwamish Number 1 Site, displayed at the Duwamish Longhouse

Lushootseed-speaking Coast Salish peoples occupied the region for thousands of years prior to colonization. The earliest evidence of human habitation in the Duwamish watershed dates to c. 12,000 BCE. The eponymous Duwamish people (dxʷdəwʔabš, 'people of the inside') occupied the river basin prior to colonization. The lower river valley had three major settlements. túʔulʔaltxʷ ("Herring's House") had a large potlatch house and at least four longhouses. Across the estuary at tutúɬaqs ("Little-bit-straight Point") were another three longhouses. Slightly inland was the village of yəlíqʷad ("Basketry Hat"), with three large longhouses; this site was abandoned following a smallpox epidemic in the 1770s.

Denser settlement increased towards the Duwamish heartland in the dxʷdəw (the region centered around the confluence of the Duwamish, Black, Cedar and Green rivers), with at least four settlements located in the area prior to American settlement. Coast Salish villages were typically composed of longhouses occupied by extended families. The density of settlement in the Duwamish river valley allowed for relative ease of trade and communication.

Pacific salmon, caught in the Duwamish and adjacent rivers, was the staple protein of local Coast Salish. It could be readily preserved via smoking or drying, and different species of salmon had predictable and seasonal runs. Edible seaweeds and shellfish such as oysters, geoduck, and cockles were gathered from the massive mud flats at the river's mouth, with low tides revealing several miles of exposed mud. Further inland, the Duwamish valley opened into forests containing the useful Douglas fir and redcedar, as well as game such as deer. Native peoples hunted harbor seals, who were able to travel several miles upriver. Plants such as berries and camas, at times managed by controlled burns, were also staple food sources.

=== Colonial settlement ===
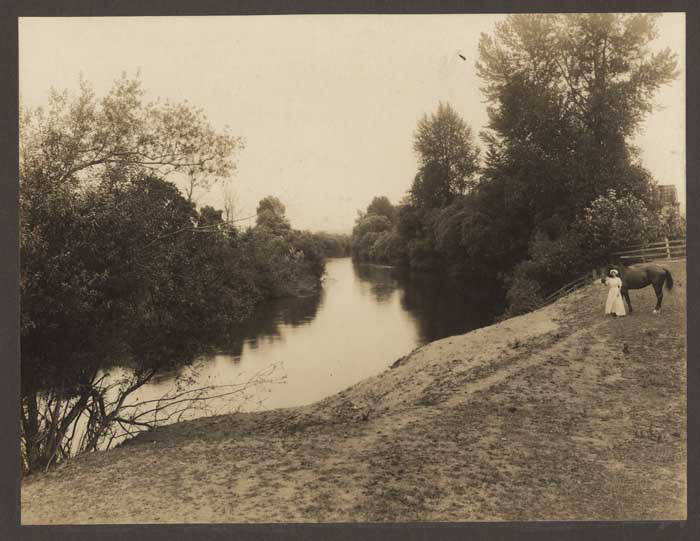
Undeveloped portion of the Duwamish, c. 1914

The first known Europeans to enter the Puget Sound were the members of George Vancouver's 1792 expedition. British, Spanish, and Russian merchants frequented the region in the following years as part of the maritime fur trade, trading with the native peoples for pelts, which they sold in Asia, and a carve-out for the trade was included in the Treaty of 1818, which saw the United Kingdom and the United States agree to jointly occupy the region. Although the Hudson's Bay Company loosely administered the Puget Sound area as part of the Columbia District fur-trading region, indigenous interactions with the company were mainly limited to the outpost at Fort Nisqually in what is now DuPont, Washington. In 1846, with increasing numbers of settlers traveling the Oregon Trail, the area was transferred to full United States control and American colonists began to settle in what was to become the Washington Territory.

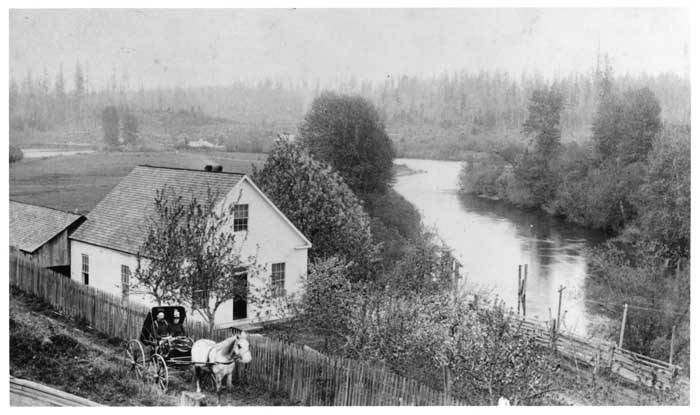
Settler James W. Steele's homestead on the Duwamish, c. 1885

In the spring or summer of 1850, Colonel Isaac Ebey surveyed the area, canoeing down a portion of the river and recording it as the "Dewams". Pioneer John Holgate also canoed down the Duwamish along with two hired native guides that summer. He considered settling, but ultimately did not stake a claim until returning to the area in 1853. In September 1851, a party of homesteaders traveled from California to the Duwamish Valley to stake farm claims. Luther Collins held the largest of these initial claims, a 640 acre riverside parcel encompassing the modern neighborhood of Georgetown and portions of Beacon Hill. Two other homesteaders settled further upriver in 1853 and began logging operations. Settlers introduced livestock to the region and cleared forests for pastureland.

After the outbreak of the Puget Sound War and the Treaty of Point Elliott in 1855, the Fort Dent military blockhouse was erected at former site of a Duwamish tribal settlement near the source of the river. The Duwamish were briefly relocated to the Port Madison Indian Reservation across the Puget Sound. A lack of resources and conflicts with the Suquamish prompted the majority to return to their traditional territory along the Duwamish river by late 1856. By the summer of 1857, around 300 Duwamish people likely resided at tutúɬaqs. Some later joined the Muckleshoot. Those that remained in the valley were subject to settler attacks and arsons over the following decades, including the burning of túʔulʔaltxʷ in 1893, leading the population to disperse. In 1910, the Duwamish people had a small village at the former settlement of Foster along the upper Duwamish.

Logjams on the river were cleared for boat access during the 1870s, disrupting salmon habitats. The cleared river allowed the Puget Sound mosquito fleet to offer passenger ferry service on the Duwamish. This industry continued until the 1920s, when it declined due to the spread of automobiles.

=== Development ===
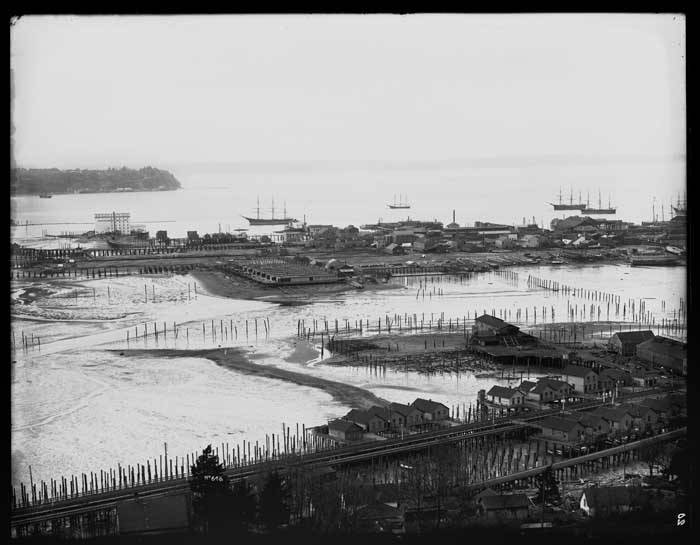
View of the Duwamish estuary tideflats from Beacon Hill, showing trestle posts, c. 1898

Following the railroad company Northern Pacific's decision to place the western terminus of the Northern Pacific Railway in Tacoma, the Seattle government began investment into efforts for a separate regional railway line to compete with Northern Pacific. In July 1873, the Seattle and Walla Walla Railroad company incorporated and began selling shares, initially seeking to build a line across the Cascades to connect the city to eastern Washington. The Seattle City Council bestowed the Duwamish estuary tide flats to the company, which began surveying efforts that winter. Many community volunteers (who worked in exchange for shares in the company) began construction work in May 1874, regrading and laying track along the Duwamish valley. The tide flats proved a formidable barrier to railway development, and no attempt was made to cross it until a massive investment by James Colman into the struggling railway company in 1876. Beginning in May, former police chief Joe Surber was contracted to pile drive the flats, with a work crew constructing a trestle bridge that remained significantly above water at high tide. Construction on the Seattle and Walla Walla finished in August and October, stretching only as far east as Renton and Newcastle.

The original trestle, weakened by shipworms, was abandoned following the railroad's 1880 sale to Henry Villard, who renamed it the Columbia and Puget Sound Railroad. A second trestle was constructed by Surber, generally following the modern course of Interstate 5. Increasing amounts of land in the northern estuary and tide flats was wharfed and subject to industrial development. Marginalized groups such as Chinese immigrants and sex workers were relegated to the inexpensive but notoriously foul-smelling and low-quality reclaimed land by social and economic pressure.

In 1883, Henry Yesler began to construct on the tidal flats of the Duwamish estuary, which by then were in the possession of Villard and Northern Pacific; however, they declined to take any action against Yesler, and in doing so triggered a land rush for the tidal flats. Engineer James J. Hill proposed the construction of a railroad terminal on the flats, opposed by City Engineer Reginald H. Thomson, who argued that it would interfere with the future development of the delta.

In the 1890s, governor Eugene Semple proposed the construction of a canal from Elliot Bay through Beacon Hill into Lake Washington, alongside a series of channels through the Duwamish tide flats. The material displaced would be used to reclaim much of the tidelands. Semple argued this land could be sold to finance the project. Semple pushed a bill through the Washington legislature in 1893 to allow private contractors to build waterways on state land. He incorporated a company to manage the project the next year and began fundraising, but received push-back from landowners and figures such as lawyer Thomas Burke, who invested in an alternate northern canal route through Lake Union.

Beginning in 1901, Semple's Waterway Company utilized water cannons to blow material away from Beacon Hill and into the Duwamish tideflats. His opponents used financial pressure and various legal challenges in an attempt to halt the canal's construction. After a 1902 Congressional hearing, the United States Army Corps of Engineers examined the two canal proposals and cautioned against both, judging the southern route to be impractical and the northern route to be unreasonably expensive. As his project was privately-funded, the Waterway Company continued construction on the south canal. However, the cost of the large amount of water used in the process provoked political opposition, leading the city to cancel its water contract with Semple. His company shifted to digging drainage canals for flood control through the reclaimed Duwamish tideflats. However, these did little to alleviate flooding.

=== Rerouting ===
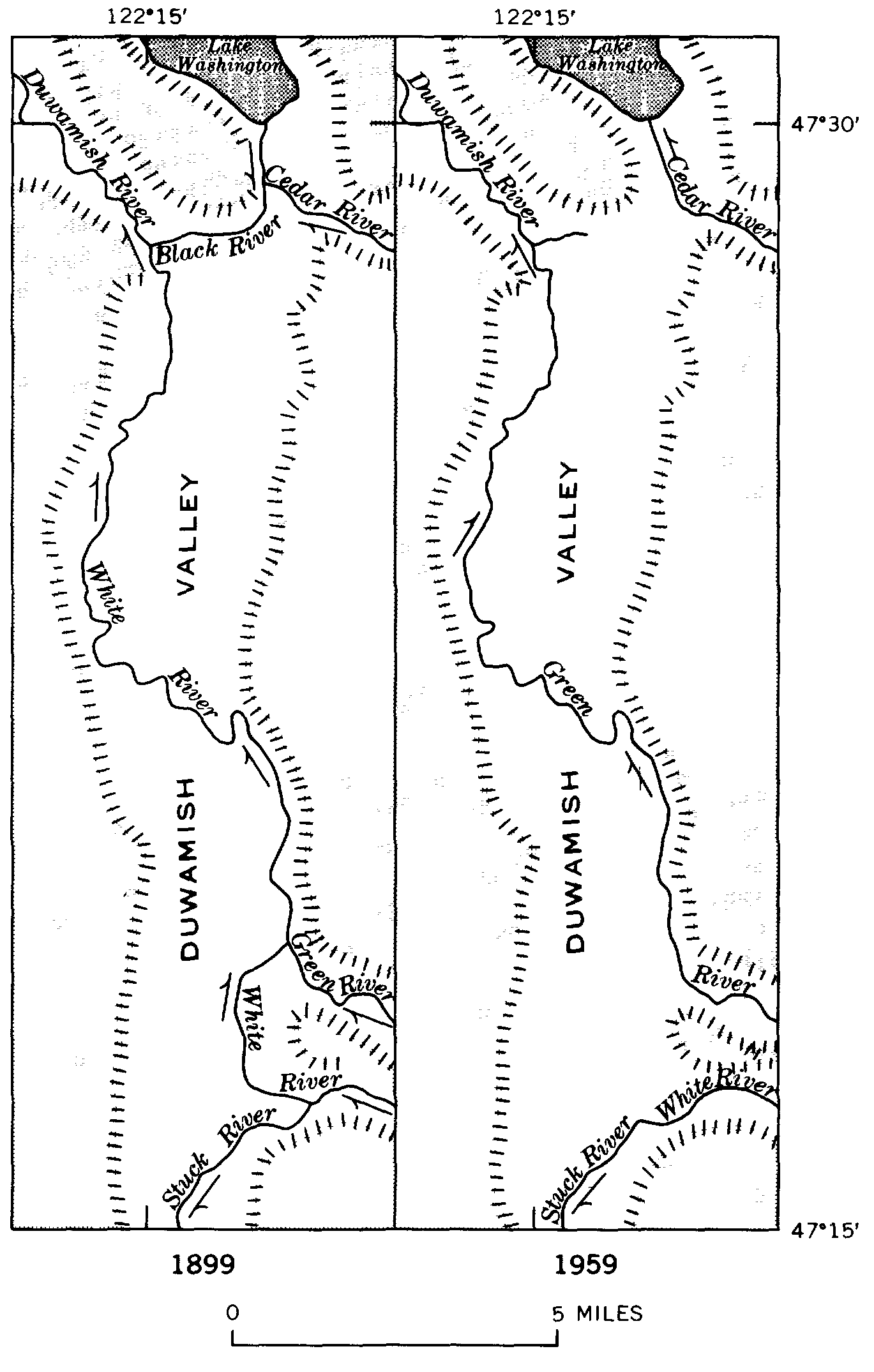
Map of the Duwamish and adjacent rivers before and after rerouting

As forests in the Duwamish Valley were cleared, flooding in the area worsened. A major flood, described by contemporary accounts as the worst in living memory, hit the valley in late 1892. After local farmers used explosives to clear a small bluff in 1899, much of the White River accidentally flooded into the Stuck River, previously a small distributary channel which drained into the Puyallup. This greatly lessened the floods of the Duwamish Valley in southern King County, but worsened the situation in the Puyallup watershed of neighboring Pierce County, leading to tensions between the two counties. Following lawsuits by Pierce County farmers, the Washington Supreme Court ruled that the rerouting was legal.

After heavy rainfall and the rapid melting of Cascade snows in November 1906, the White River and Duwamish flooded, the most severe flood ever recorded in the watershed. Although the area around Kent was flooded, waters rapidly receded after a logjam south of Auburn diverted the entirety of the White River into the Stuck. Following further legal battles and King County's deployment of armed guards into the valley to prevent a further rerouting, city engineer Hiram M. Chittenden moved to support maintain the river's new course. In exchange King County reached a deal with Pierce to pay for 60% of the Pierce County flood control budget for 99 years.

The Green River and Black River continued to flow into the Duwamish. The Black River continued to serve as a flood risk, bringing in water from Lake Washington and indirectly Lake Sammamish, as well as from the Cedar River, which periodically inundated the watershed during the spring.

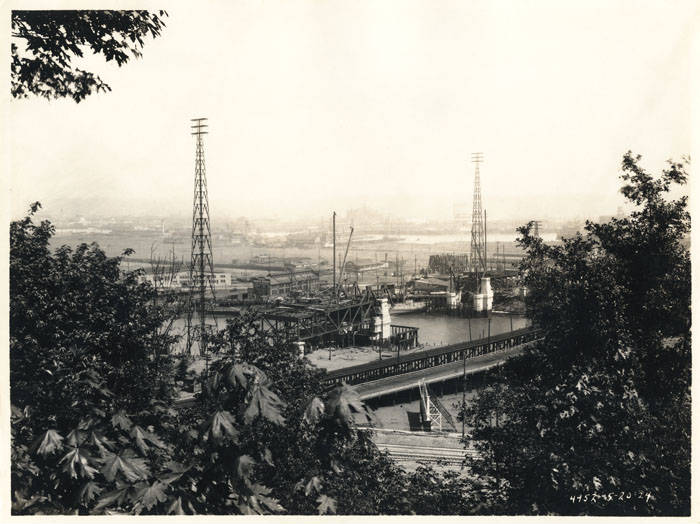
View of the West Spokane Street Bridge and Harbor Island, 1924

In 1900, the Seattle General Construction Company was given the permit to fill the Duwamish tideflats. The Puget Sound Bridge and Dredging Company was contracted to build an island on the flats using soil dredged from the river, as well as earth displaced during contemporary regrading efforts such as the Denny Regrade. The lone resident of the remaining tidal flats, a chicken farmer named Charles Butler, was evicted from the area. In 1910, the company completed the construction of Harbor Island, then the largest artificial island in the world, dividing the mouth of the Duwamish into east and west channels. In 1911, the Cedar River was diverted from directly draining into the Black River, instead flowing into Lake Washington.

The concept of straightening the Duwamish into a single, deep channel was first proposed in 1892, but initially deemed impractical. In 1909, the Washington State Legislature authorized the creation of improvement districts to expand the lower Duwamish for the access of larger ships, as well as construct a ship canal allowing access to Lake Washington. These improvement districts would have the ability to issue bonds and levy taxes. King County voters approved a $1.75 million bond issue the following year. Efforts to expand the port were briefly blocked by legal intervention from rail interests, but these were opposed by other businesses. Governor Marion Hay supported the creation of a public port, which was instituted in March 1911 by the Port District Act. This act authorized the creation of port districts to construct and manage harbor facilities, including waterways. The Port of Seattle was created to manage local harbor facilities.

The 1911 Plan of Seattle outlined the importance of channeling the Duwamish, clearing its meanders and its many small tributary creeks. The Duwamish Waterway was initially planned to be 300 feet (91 m) in width and extend to the former confluence of the Green and White Rivers in Auburn. One proposal extended the canal even further, connecting it with Commencement Bay in Tacoma. Construction began in 1913, focused on the five-mile portion south of Harbor Island.

Chittenden lobbied for federal funding to construct the northern canal. The Lake Washington Ship Canal and the Ballard Locks were opened in 1917, leading to the lowering of Lake Washington's water level by nine feet. Cut off from the Black River, the lake began to drain out through the canal, reducing the Black River to a small creek occupying only a portion of its previous course. As a result, the Green River and Duwamish effectively became one continuous river. The discharge and drainage area of the Duwamish system were reduced by 70%.

=== Industrialization ===
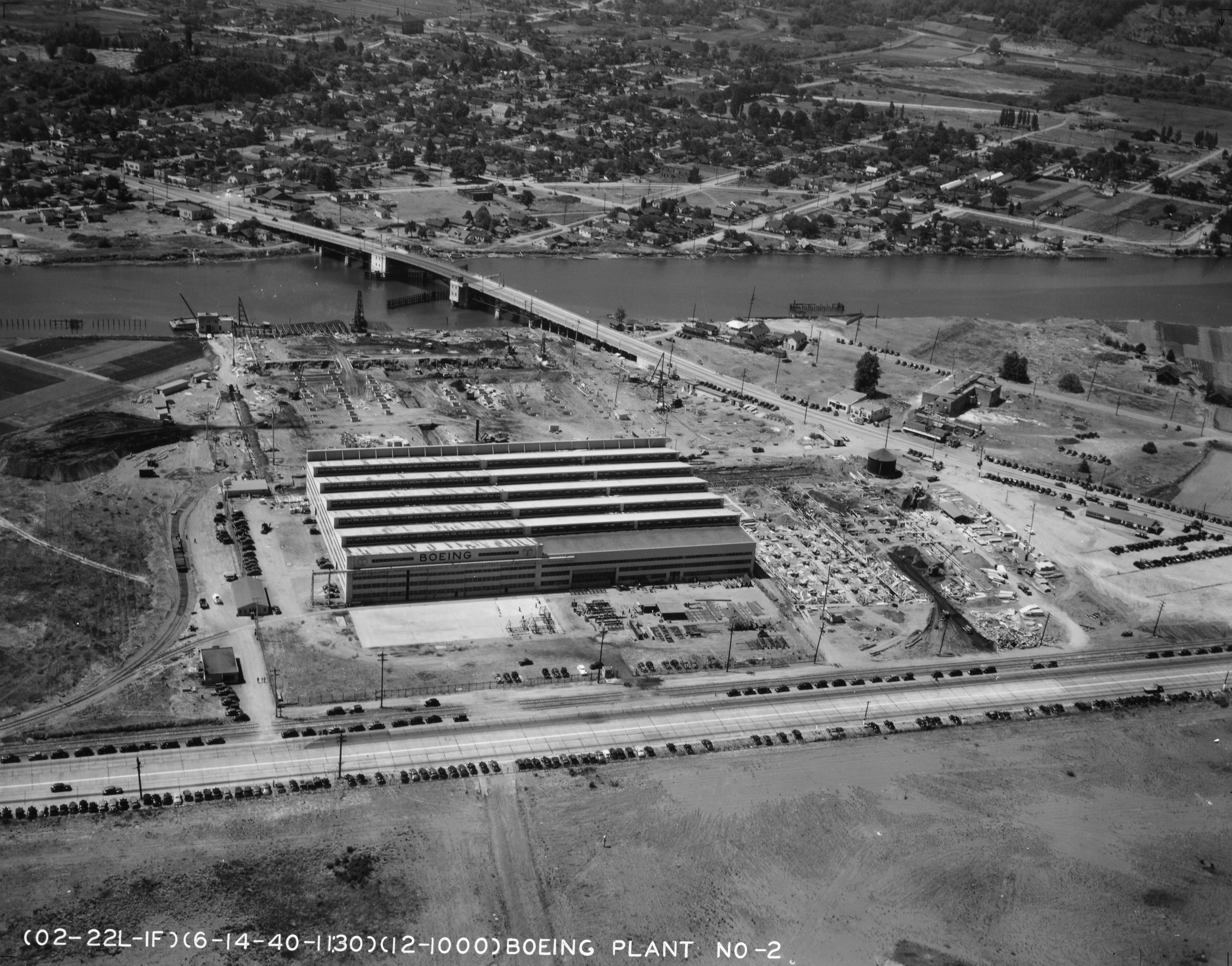
Boeing Plant 2 in 1940, with the Duwamish behind it

At the turn of the 20th century, the land around the Duwamish was primarily used for agriculture. During the early 1900s, industrial facilities such as lumberyards, steel mills, cement and brick manufacturers, and shipyards were constructed in the area. Among the first was the Georgetown Steam Plant, constructed in 1906.

Shipyards were established on the Harbor Island and the Duwamish Waterway during the early 1910s. In 1916, the Boeing Airplane Company was founded. It constructed a factory along the east bank of the Duwamish two years later, and began testing aircraft at fields along the river valley. These were consolidated into a larger airfield, named Boeing Field after it was acquired by King County in 1928. Boeing constructed Plant No. 2 along the river at Tukwila in 1936, spanning over 100 acres (40 ha). Industrial activity around the Duwamish greatly expanded after the outbreak of World War II in 1939. The Boeing plant was used to produce transport and bomber aircraft, while the Seattle-Tacoma Shipbuilding Corporation greatly expanded industrial production in its Harbor Island drydocks. By the mid-1950s, early industrial activities such as lumber milling and brick manufacture had ceased.

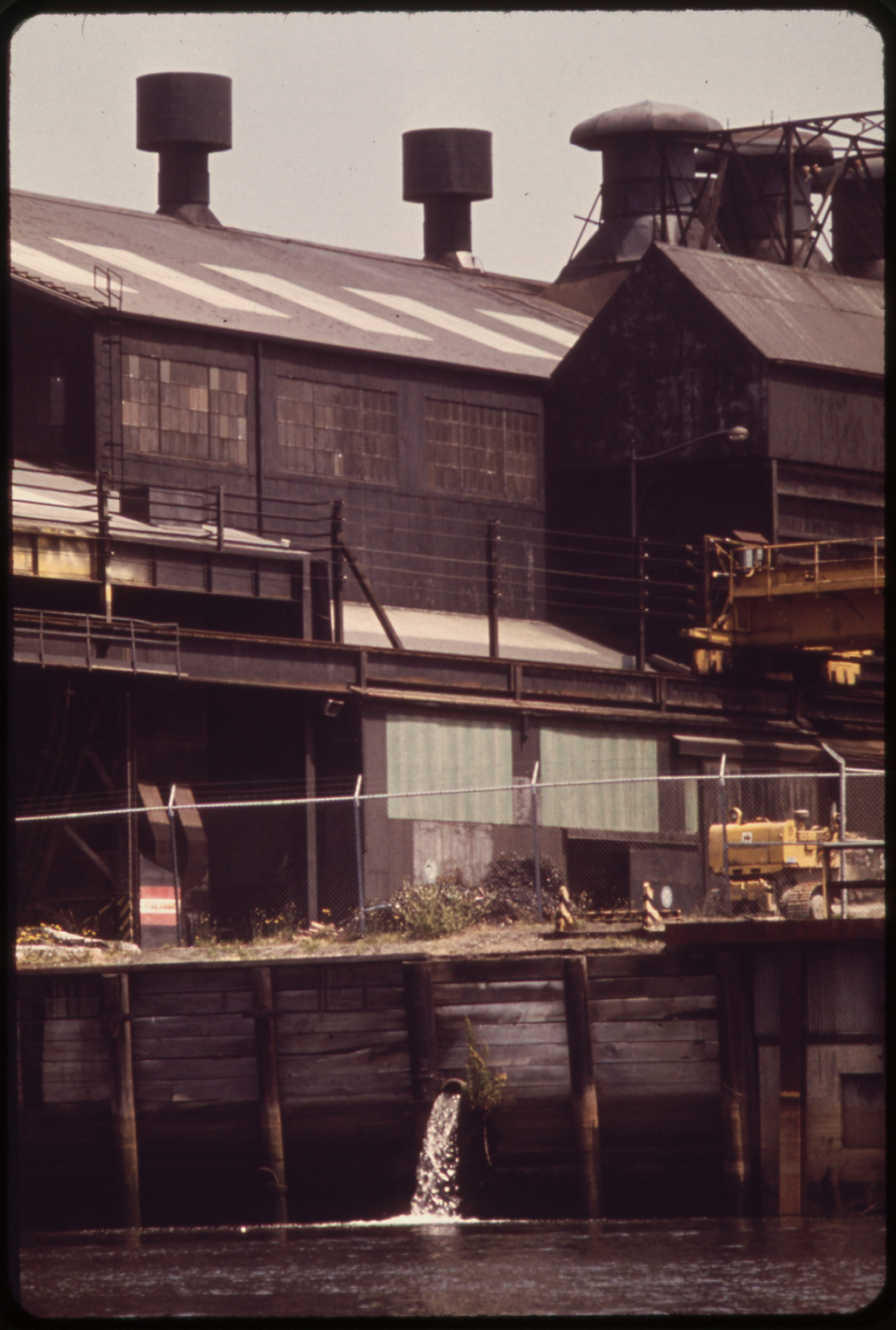
A factory culvert dumping wastewater into the Duwamish, 1973

Seattle's early sewer system, constructed in the first decade of the 1900s, pumped sewage and wastewater into water sources such as the Duwamish and Lake Washington. The sewer systems of Auburn, Kent, and Renton, built over the following decades, discharged untreated sewage into the Duwamish watershed. Following worsening water conditions in Lake Washington in the 1930s, several sewage pipelines previously discharging into the lake were instead redirected to the Duwamish. The river's first sewage treatment plant was established in 1938. A sanitary sewer system was constructed in the river basin during the 1970s.

The Howard A. Hanson Dam was constructed on the Green River in 1961, lessening the periodic flooding of the Green-Duwamish watershed. During the 1950s and 1960s, the Seattle government attempted to rezone the South Park and Georgetown neighborhoods to allow for further industrial expansion along the Duwamish. This was strongly opposed by South Park residents, leading the city to abandon the planned rezoning in 1967.

=== Contemporary history and restoration ===
By the 1980s, up to 25% of the river's flow during low periods was effluent from a sewage treatment facility in Renton, which had taken over from various smaller sewage plants to process waste from around Seattle and Lake Washington. This improved the water quality of the lake, but significantly decreased that of the Duwamish. In 1987, the plant's discharge pipe was extended to Puget Sound, bypassing the river. However, various sewer outflows continued to dump into the lower Duwamish Waterway.

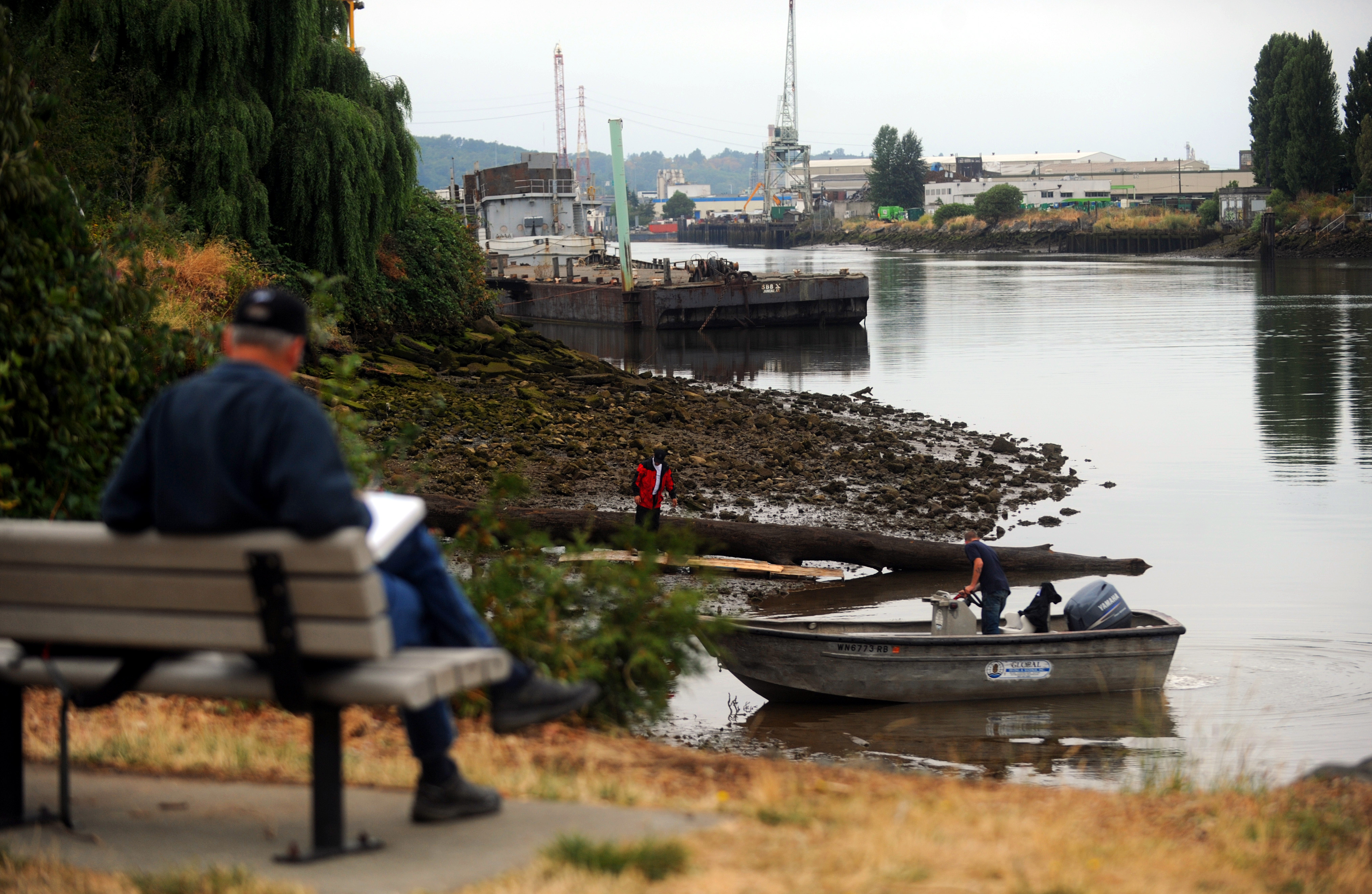
View of the river from Duwamish Waterway Park, 2009

In 1977, the remains of an ancient Native American village were discovered by a University of Washington team on the western bank of the river near Kellogg Island, interrupting the Port of Seattle's construction of a terminal. The area was placed on the National Register of Historic Places as the Duwamish #1 Site and left undeveloped for several decades. This discovery led environmentalists to push to declare the island as a bird sanctuary, a project which was ultimately successful after years of opposition from the Port of Seattle. Terminal 107 Park was opened on the site in 2000, later renamed to həʔapus Village Park and Shoreline Habitat.

The Washington government inconsistently enforced the provisions of the 1972 Clean Water Act, prompting private groups to sue several companies which polluted in the Duwamish in the 1990s. The United States Environmental Protection Agency (EPA) declared Harbor Island and the adjacent East and West Duwamish waterways as one of its first Superfund sites in 1983, while the 5 miles (8.0 km) stretch of the river from the southern end of Harbor Island was declared the Lower Duwamish Waterway Superfund site in 2001. The broader watershed was designated as part of the EPA's Urban Waters Federal Partnership program in 2013. As part of contaminant remediation efforts, Boeing restored 5 acres (2 ha) of shoreline on the Duwamish Waterway in 2013 in what at that point was the largest restoration project undertaken in the estuary.

== Land use ==
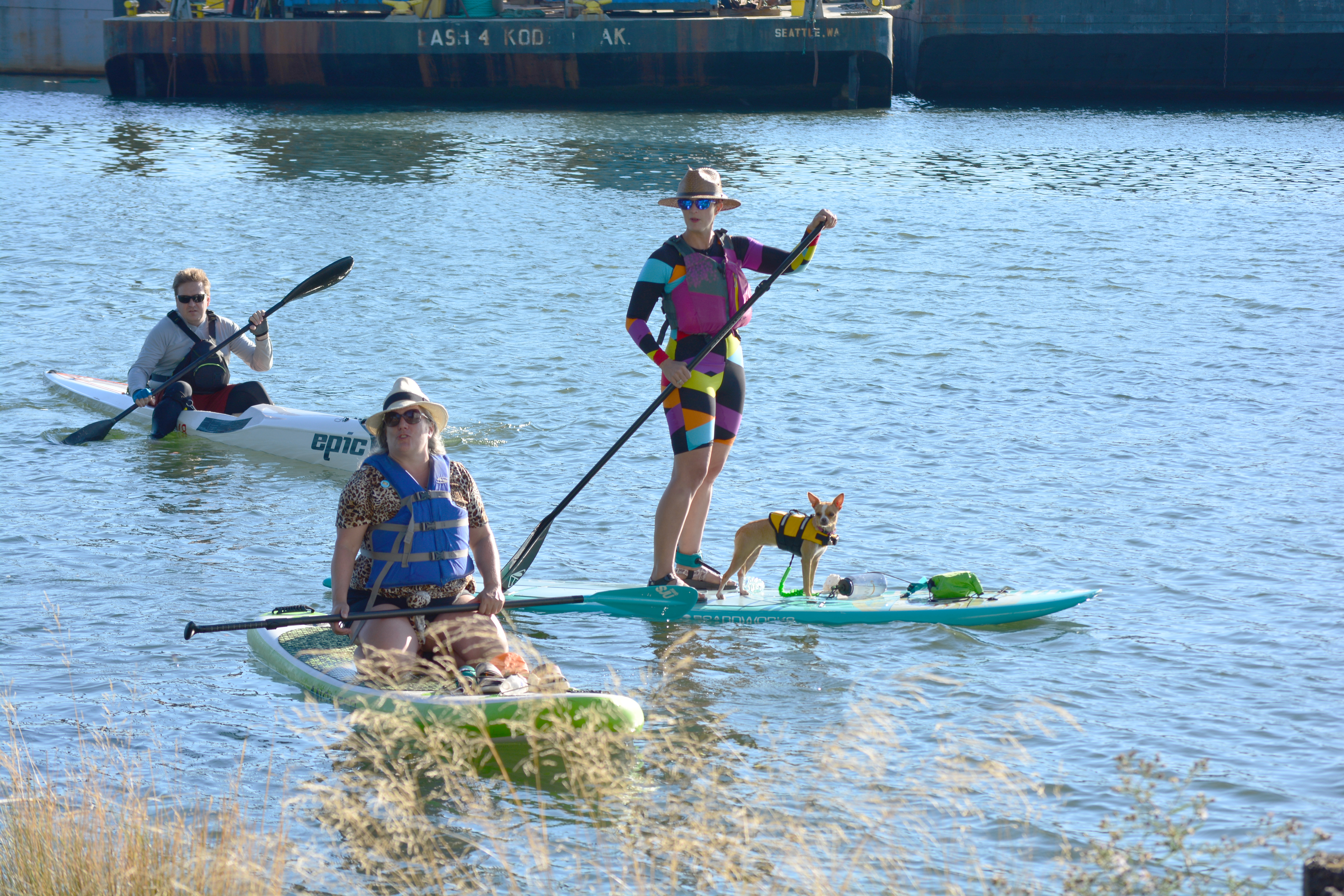
The Duwamish is used for recreational activities such as paddleboarding and kayaking

The lower Duwamish shoreline primarily consists of commercial and industrial properties. Two Seattle neighborhoods near the river, Georgetown and South Park, contain a mix of residential and commercial areas, including a small number of houses directly along the river. As of 2017, the combined Duwamish-Green watershed has a population of around 630,000. Residents of the urban areas in the Duwamish valley are generally low-income, and at a higher risk of suffering negative health effects from environmental damage.

The Green and Duwamish watersheds are collectively managed by the state government as Water Resource Inventory Area 9.

=== Recreation and fishing ===
The Duwamish is used for recreational activities such as boating, fishing, and kayaking. Members of the Muckleshoot and Suquamish Indian Tribe continue to exercise traditional fishing rights in the Duwamish estuary, with the former maintaining a commercial fishery in the area. Migratory salmon from the waterway are generally safe to eat, while resident fish, crabs, and shellfish from the waterway often contain toxic chemicals such as polychlorinated biphenyl.

The Port of Seattle owns various public parks along the Duwamish Waterway, expanded during environmental restoration efforts. Terminal 18 Park sits on the southwestern edge of the Harbor Island. On the western shoreline of the waterway are t̓uʔəlaltxʷ Village Park and həʔapus Village Park, near the Duwamish Longhouse. Jack Perry Park and sbəq̓ʷaʔ Park are on the eastern shore of the waterway in SoDo. Around the South Park neighborhood are Duwamish Waterway Park, t̓ałt̓ałucid Park, Duwamish River People's Park, and Salmon Cove Park, all on the western bank. The Lushootseed names t̓uʔəlaltxʷ, həʔapus, sbəq̓ʷaʔ, and t̓ałt̓ałucid, alongside Salmon Cove and Duwamish River People's Park, were implemented after community comment in October 2020. These parks were previously named for shipping terminals and streets, resulting in names described as confusing and difficult to locate.
