= History of the Duwamish people =

The region now known as Seattle has been inhabited since the end of the last glacial period (c. 8,000 BCE.: 10,000 years ago). Archaeological excavations at West Point in Discovery Park, Magnolia confirm that the Seattle area has been inhabited by humans for at least 4,000 years and probably much longer. West Point was called Oka-dz-elt-cu, Per-co-dus-chule, or Pka-dzEltcu. The village of tohl-AHL-too ("herring house") had been inhabited at least since the 6th century CE, as had hah-AH-poos—"where there are horse clams"—at the then-mouth of the Duwamish River in what is now the Industrial District. The Lushootseed (Skagit-Nisqually)-speaking Salish Dkh^{w}'Duw'Absh ("People of the Inside") and Xacuabš ("People of the Large Lake")—ancestors of today's Duwamish Tribe—occupied at least 17 villages in the mid-1850s and lived in some 93 permanent longhouses (khwaac'ál'al) along the lower Duwamish River, Elliott Bay, Salmon Bay, Portage Bay, Lake Washington, Lake Sammamish, and the Duwamish River tributaries, the Black and Cedar Rivers.

Tens of people lived in each longhouse; forerunners of cohousing, they were cooperatives of extended families that were quite unlike the single or single family cabins of White American settlements. The villages were traditionally larger than they might have first appeared to White settlers, since Coast Salish people had, in recent decades before extensive White settlement (c. 1774–1864), experienced some 62% losses due to introduced diseases. For comparison, the catastrophic Spanish flu Pandemic of 1918–19 took an estimated 2.5%–5% mortality worldwide; about 28% of the U.S. population contracted the Spanish flu.

Like many Northwest Coast natives, the Dkh^{w}'Duw'Absh and Xacuabš relied heavily on fishing for their well-being and their livelihood: the Pacific Northwest fisheries were once one of the richest in the world, second only to the Grand Banks. Remnants of Dkh^{w}'Duw'Absh fishing gear were found near the abundant tide pools of sbuh-KWAH-buks ("shaped like a bear's head", the West Seattle peninsula). The site is in what is now called Me-Kwa-Mooks Park, where dense trees provide habitat for many birds including screech owls. Me-Kwa-Mooks Park is about 1 mi. (1.6 km) west of Camp Long in the south of the Alki neighborhood of West Seattle, (map ). Up the hill, a 50-acre (20 hectare) stand of massive, old-growth Douglas fir and western red cedar—many towering more than 200 feet (61 m), their roots carpeted by sword ferns and salal—survived the clear cutting of Seattle. The fragment of forest in Schmitz Park (1908–1912) is a living reminder of what much of Seattle looked like before the City of Seattle.

From the 1800s the Maritime Fur Trade opened access to European goods for rival northern tribes from Vancouver Island and the Georgia Strait). Having guns prompted their more effective raiding south, deep into recently named Puget Sound, in turn prompting social and organizational change. The Hudson's Bay Company (HBC) established Fort Langley (1827), then Fort Nisqually (1833) near present-day Dupont, within easy range and prompting keen interest in trade. As a young man, Si'ahl (later called Chief Seattle) made himself both well-known and notorious around Fort Nisqually. Catholic missionaries began arriving in 1839, settlers in earnest from 1845. In 19th century maneuvering with European Great Powers, the United States assumed regional sovereignty in 1846. White settlements at sbuh-KWAH-buks (Alki) and what is now Pioneer Square in Downtown Seattle were established in 1851 and 1852. The latter settlement was right upon and between prominent villages on Elliott Bay and villages on the Duwamish River estuary.

== Origins and prehistory ==
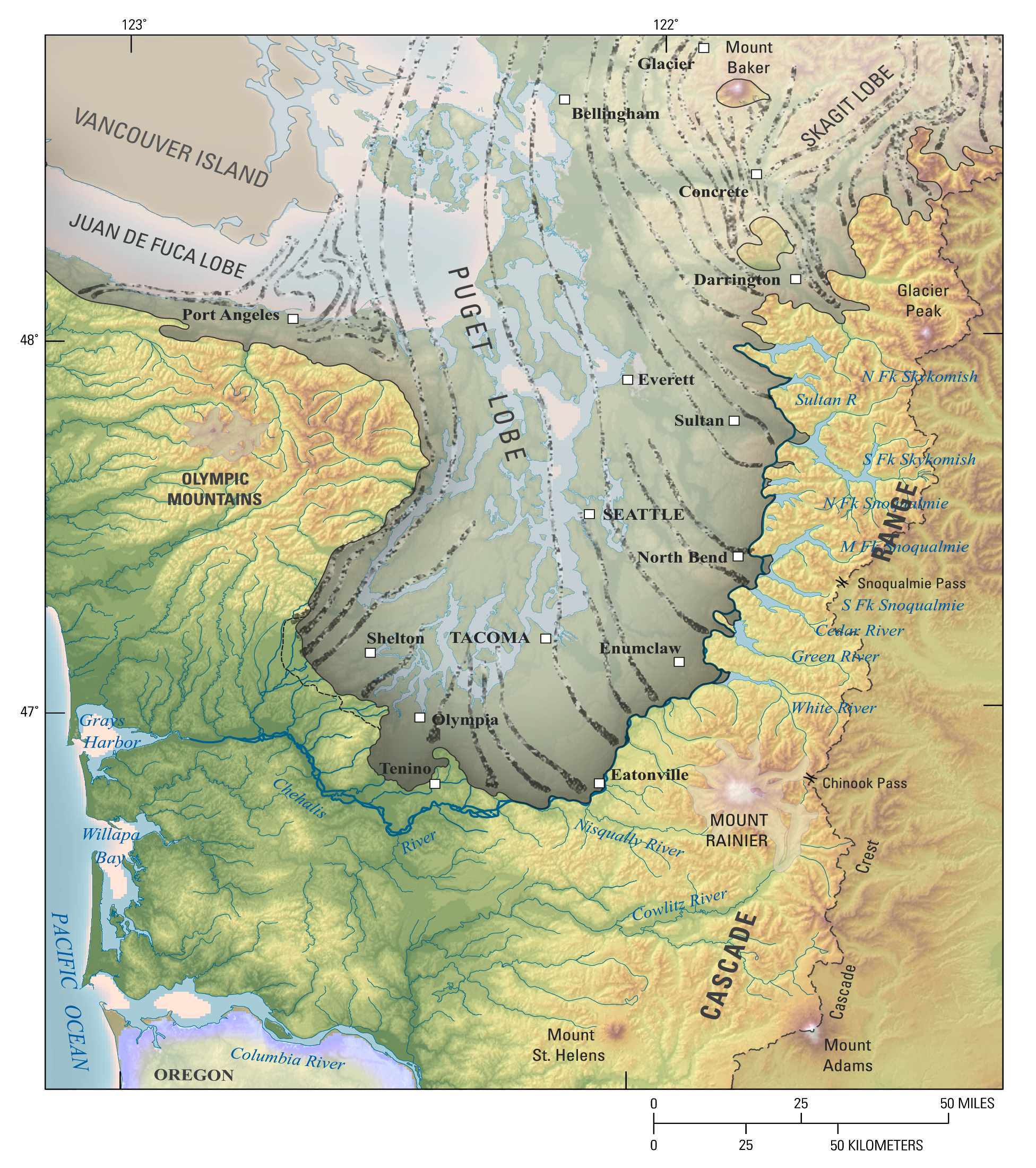
The Puget Lobe, which covered Puget Sound for thousands of years

Western Washington has been permanently inhabited since at least 12,000 years ago, at the end of the Pleistocene epoch and the Last Glacial Maximum. Although it is possible that humans lived in the region before that time, the landscape was highly volcanic and unstable, leading to vast alteration of the coastline and rivers over time. Much of the Puget Sound region was covered in glaciers, unsuitable for long-term settlement until the eventual recession of the mile-thick sheets of ice. After the recession of the glaciers, humans were able to permanently move into the region. Duwamish oral history recorded the recession of the glaciers in a story called the "Epic of the Winds." The epic describes how North Wind covered the land in ice by building a dam across the Duwamish River. North Wind loved Mountain Beaver, and he killed her husband, South Wind. The child of South Wind and Mountain Beaver, Storm Wind, sought revenge against North Wind for the murder of his father. Storm Wind brought torrents into the region, driving the ice of North Wind away, pushing him far to the north.

The earliest evidence for human habitation along the Duwamish watershed dates back 12,000 years, with most of the waterways being first peopled around 7,000-8,000 years ago. The oldest settlement occupied by the ancestors of the Duwamish was at Bear Creek (tubaʔal), near what is now Woodinville. The Bear Creek site was formerly a tool-making site between 10,000 and 12,500 years ago. Tools discovered at the site contained the DNA of ice-age animals consumed for food, such as bison, bear, deer, sheep, and salmon. Another archaeological site at West Point (paq̓ac̓aɬčuʔ) had thousands of artifacts dating back 4,200 years. Villages at the mouth of the Duwamish River such as t̕uʔəlalʔtxʷ had been continuously inhabited since the 6th century CE.

In the year 1700, a massive earthquake shook the Northwest Coast, felt as far away as Japan. The quake resulted in a large tsunami which struck the coastline. This event is recorded in Duwamish oral history, in which Thunderbird participated in an ancient battle, shaking the ground and "rolling up" the waters.

In the first half of the 19th century, the Duwamish began facing extreme raiding from the Lekwiltok and Kwakwaka'wakw, who raided much of the Puget Sound area for slaves and loot. Food resources varied, and resources were not always sufficient to last through to spring. There is evidence that an extensive trade and potlatch network evolved to help distribute resources to areas in need that varied year to year, and was potent and effective until European diseases arriving in the 1770s and ravaged the region for more than a century.

By 1851, the Duwamish had around 17 villages with a total of 93 buildings, including longhouses, around the present-day Seattle area. There were four prominent villages on Elliott Bay and the lower Duwamish River. Before modern civil engineering, the area at the mouth of Elliott Bay had extensive tidelands which were abundantly rich in marine life and a plentiful source of food for the Duwamish.

== 1855–1920s ==
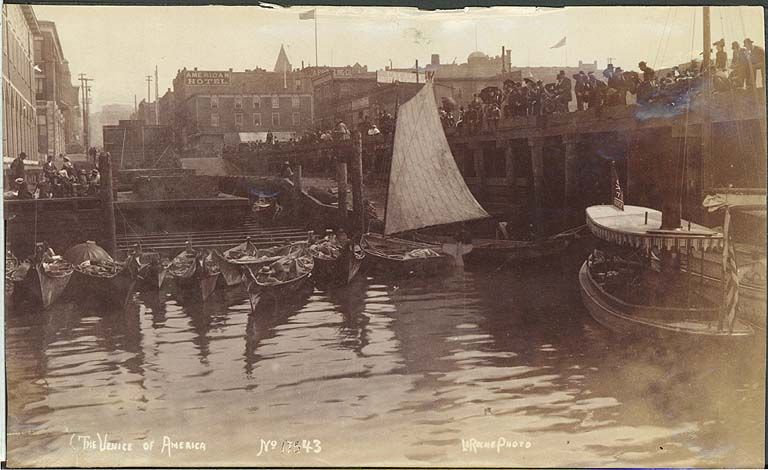
Seaettle waterfront with moored Indian canoes, Seattle, c. 1892

By the time Coast Salish began to realize the implications of the changes brought by Europeans at ever-increasing rates, the time was late. After just five years, lands were occupied; the harsh Treaty of Point Elliott was signed in 1855. There is question about the legitimacy of the treaty, from the lack of understanding of whether the Natives signing the treaty were legitimate representatives of their peoples and whether the written treaty accurately matched what they were told they were signing. Squalli-Absch ("People of the Grass Country", Nisqually) si'ab Lescay (Chief Leschi, 1808–1858) urged and led resistance, with Yakama Chief Kamiakim. Si'ahl warned his white friend and sub-Indian Agent 'Doc' Maynard, possibly saving some 30 white people in early Seattle by sending a messenger to warn of a raid by Lescay and Kamiakim's war party (1856). Note that Native Americans warred for complicated conceptions of prestige and for resources, and did not comprehend the European war for conquest or annihilation. The blockhouse was sturdy timber with breastworks and ravines, defended by 57 armed volunteers—at least six Marines—and overshadowed by the 150-man, 566 ton, 16 gun sloop-of-war Decatur and the bark Bronte, anchored and cannon zeroed (bearing and range laid in) at close range out on Elliott Bay. The Battle of Seattle (1856) ended more a skirmish, somewhat more farce than tragedy.

Whites asserted that the Point Elliott Treaty required the Dwamish who were living in what became metropolitan Seattle to move onto reservations established for other tribes, most of whom (with the exception of the Dkh^{w}'Suqw'Absh [Suquamish from c. 1855]) were long-time competitors if not rivals. The Duwamish tribe maintains that the terms of the treaty require a Duwamish reservation—explicitly blocked at local behest in 1866, in contravention of the superseding and precedent treaty. Some followed si'ab Si'ahl to the Suquamish reservation at Port Madison. Others moved to the Tulalip or Muckleshoot reservations. Many refused to move, or shuttled back and forth between reservations.

Among losses due to introduced diseases, a smallpox epidemic broke out among the Northwest tribes in 1862 and killed roughly half the affected native populations. Documentation in archives and historical epidemiology demonstrates that governmental policies furthered the progress of this epidemic among the natives, and did little or nothing about the waves of other introduced epidemics. Mean population decline 1774–1874 was about 66%.

The name "Seattle" for the city (c. 1853) is an Anglicization of si'áb Si'ahl, the Duwamish and Suquamish chief (si'áb, high status man). The name for the city is attributed to 'Doc' Maynard, a complex figure, who named the city after Chief Seattle, an enigmatic one. True names and images of people contain a measure of the sacred for many indigenous peoples, particularly for Coast Salish (in contrast to social names, true names are only revealed intimately). Social names are considered sacred personal property, exclusive to the particular family. Consequently, Si'ahl, the Duwamish, and Suquamish were initially not pleased with the naming of the city. Eventually an accommodation was developed, with Si'ahl being accorded due honor in both Native and White cultures, and Seattle, the city, incurred another social obligation to the Duwamish people.

The trustees of the first incorporation of Seattle (January 1865) later passed an ordinance calling for the removal of Indians and providing for the punishment of those who might harbor them. A Duwamish reservation was blocked in 1866. The commitments made by the United States government in the Treaty of Point Elliott have not yet been met.

Seattle waterfront at Washington Street c. 1890–1892, with Indian canoes moored at the boat launch. A steam launch and two small sailboats are seen, as well as a crowd on the pier.

With the regional diaspora of the Treaty, some Duwamish retreated to the West Seattle peninsula, where they carried on—at least for a while—their traditional ways of life. What was apparently their last enclave in West Seattle was destroyed by arson in 1893 when a white man identified only as "Watson" set fire to eight makeshift homes on the banks of what is today the East Waterway. Nearly all other remaining longhouses were destroyed by non-native arson by 1910. The demographic shift had become exponential after 1880.

In the 1900s, Native families came by canoe to the Seattle waterfront, where they camped on their way to work in the hops fields upriver. They were allowed to stay on Ballast Island, a bleak strip of land just offshore at what is now Alaskan Way, created by the ballast dumped from ships that took on cargoes of lumber or grain. Canvas tents were adopted in place of their native cattail mat shelters for traveling. Poverty was severe. Hops agriculture along the river valleys blossomed in the 1880s. Native men continued working in the lumber mills and in fishing; women sold shellfish, basketry, and made other adaptations.

Many longtime residents of West Seattle tell stories about finding middens full of clam scrapers, arrowheads, and other artifacts in the 1920s and 1930s—archeological sites were not protected until 1906, and then only on public land. Two vista points looking across Elliott Bay toward the city are marked with Northwest Indian totem poles.

== Notes and references ==
Most of the following notes refer to sources listed in Bibliography for Duwamish (tribe), which also includes the sources referenced in Duwamish tribe, Cheshiahud (Lake John) and History of Seattle before white settlement.

== Bibliography ==
- See Duwamish (tribe)—Bibliography.
- Cummings, BJ (2020). The River That Made Seattle - A Human and Natural History of the Duwamish. Seattle: University of Washington Press. ISBN 9780295747439.
- Waterman, T.T. (2001). Hilbert, Vi; Miller, Jay; Zahir, Zalmai (eds.). sdaʔdaʔ gʷəɬ dibəɬ ləšucid ʔacaciɬtalbixʷ - Puget Sound Geography. Lushootseed Press. ISBN 979-8750945764.
