= Ningi, Nigeria =

- City and Local government area
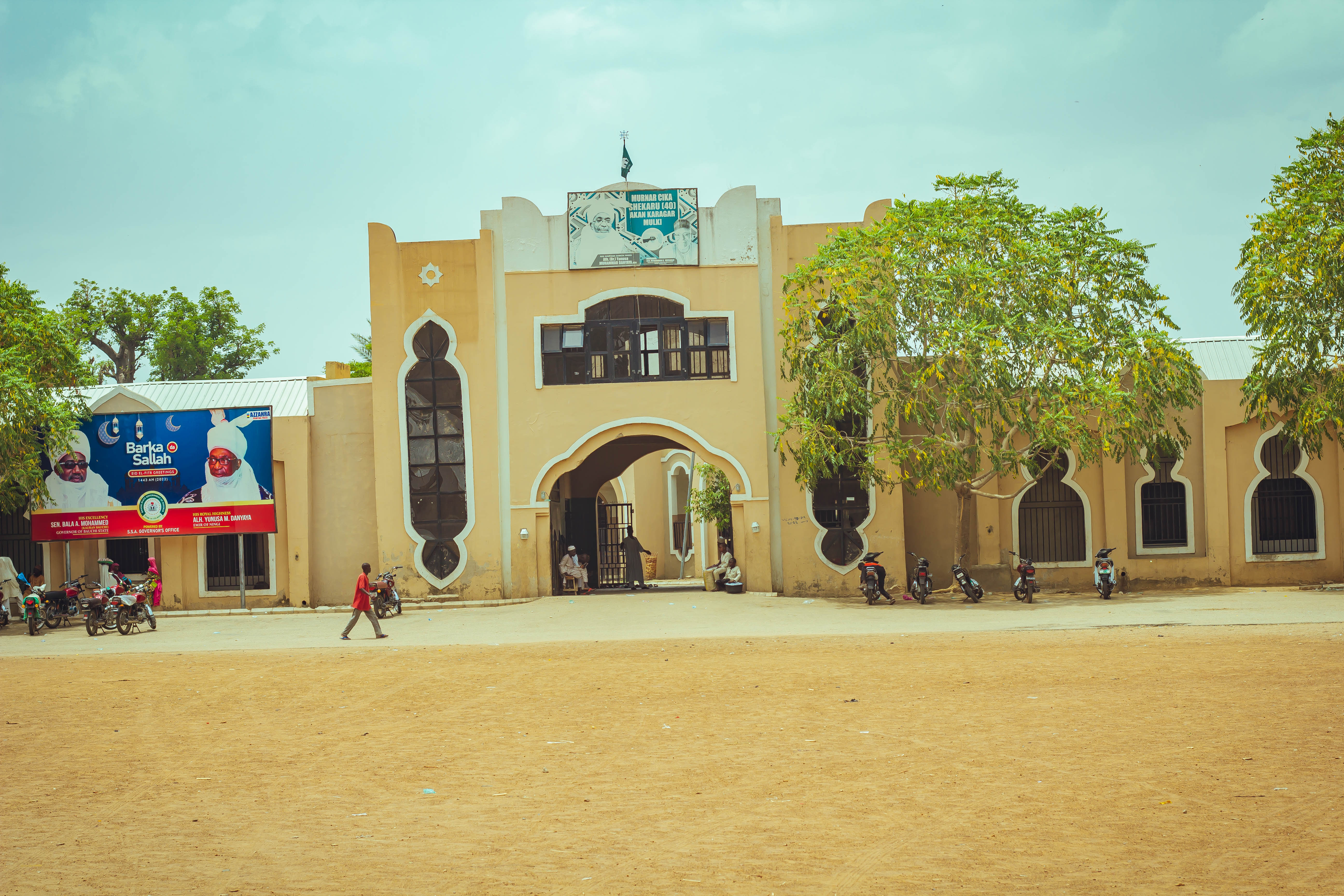
- Ningi Emirate Palace
- Interactive map of Ningi, Nigeria
- Location in Nigeria
- Coordinates: 11°4′N 9°34′E
- Country: Nigeria
- State: Bauchi State

Government
  - Local Government Chairman: Nasiru Zakarai
  - House of Representatives Member: Adamu Hashimu Ranga

Area
  - Land: 4,625 km^{2} (1,786 sq mi)

Population (2006 Population Census)
  - Total: 387,192
- Time zone: UTC+1 (WAT/CET)
- Postal code: 742001 - 742102

Ningi is a town, a local government area, and an emirate in Bauchi State, Nigeria. The Ningi emirate comprises two local government areas, Ningi and Warji, with a combined area of 5,250 km^{2} (2,030 sq mi) and a population of 501,912 according to the 2006 Census. The Ningi local government area covers an area of 4,625 km^{2} (1,786 sq mi) with a population of 387,192 at the 2006 Census. The area is inhabited mostly by Hausa people, Duwa, Ningawa. Yunusa Muhammadu Danyaya was the longest Emir to reign who ascended the throne from 1978 until his death on 25 August 2024.

The local government area was formerly home to the Gamo-Ningi language, but the last speaker died in the 1980s and the rest have switched to Hausa.

== Local Government ==
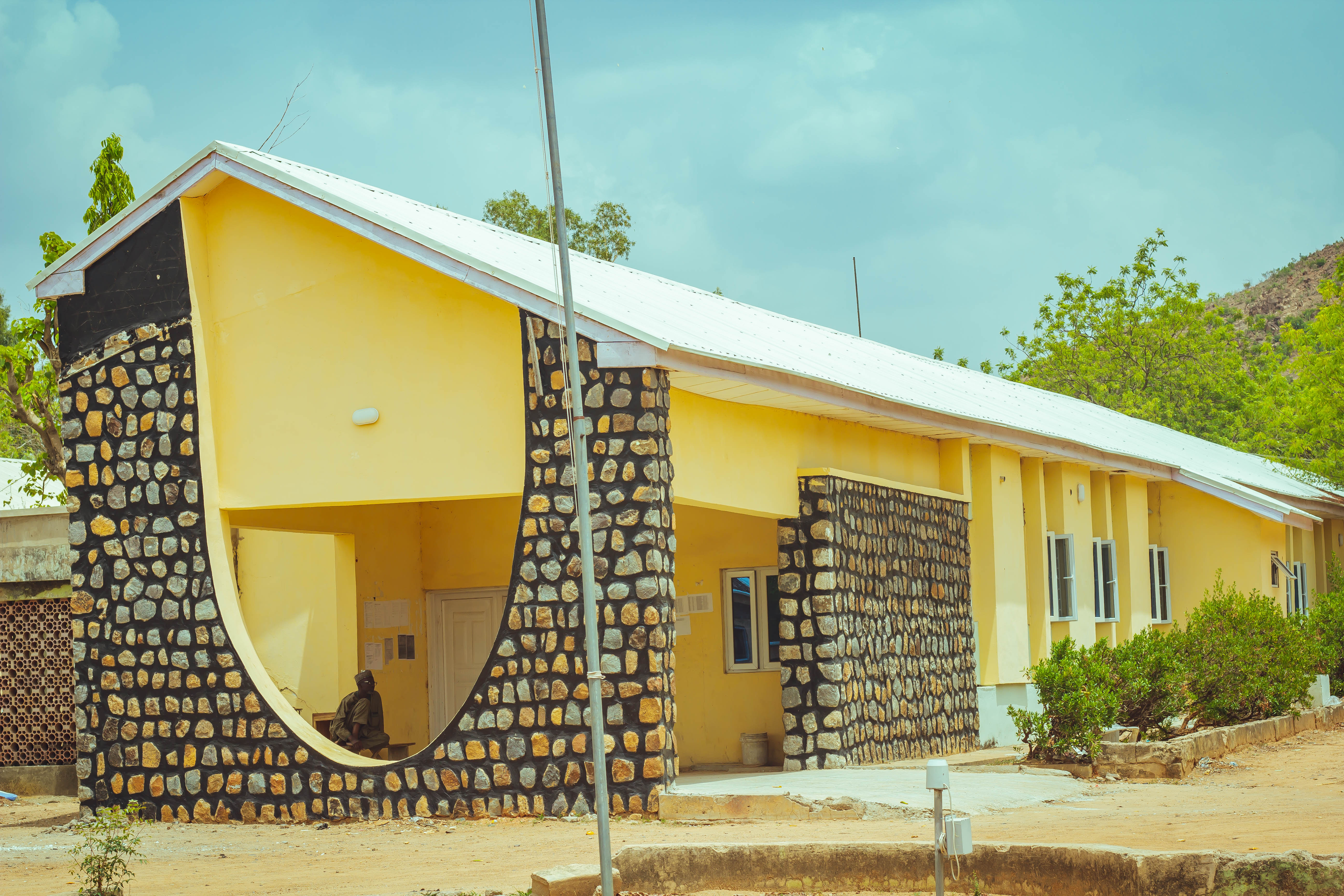
Ningi Local Government Secretariat Building

Ningi Local Government Area is in the town of Ningi and the area council comprises 3 districts;

1. Ningi
2. Ari
3. Burra

== Geography/Climate ==
The average temperature of Ningi LGA is 32 °C (90 °F) and the local government has a total area of 4,625 square kilometres (1,786 sq mi). Two distinct seasons are experienced in the region - the rainy, and dry. The average wind speed is estimated to be 10 km/h (6.2 mph).

In Ningi, the dry season is partially cloudy and hot all year round, while the wet season is oppressive and generally cloudy. The average annual temperature ranges from 13 to 39 °C (56 to 102 °F); it is infrequently below 50 °C (122 °F) or beyond 41 °C (106 °F).

From March 9 to May 18, the hot season, which has an average daily high temperature above 37 °C (98 °F), lasts for 2.3 months. With an average high of 38 °C (101 °F) and low of 23 °C (74 °F), April is the hottest month of the year in Ningi.

== Economy ==
Majorily agrarian, the Ningi LGA is recognized for raising a wide range of animals and growing a number of different crops. Sugarcane, millet, and soybeans are among the crops farmed in the Ningi LGA, and camels, cows, and goats are among the livestock raised and sold there. The Ningi LGA is home to a number of marketplaces that serve as trading hubs for a range of commodities and services, demonstrating the thriving trade that occurs there.

== List of rulers ==
1. Hamza – 1847–1849
2. Ahmadu – 1850–1855
3. Abubakar Danmaje – 1855–1870
4. Haruna Karami – 1870–1886
5. Abubakar Gajigi – 1886–1890
6. Usman Danyaya – 1890-1902
7. Mamuda Lolo – 1902–1905
8. Musa Dangwido – 1905–1906
9. (Restoration of) Mamuda Lolo – 1906–1908
10. Abdu mai Fatima – 1908–1915
11. Zakari Dankaka – 1915–1922
12. Adamu Danyaya – 1922–1955
13. Haruna II – 1955–1957
14. Abdullahi Adamu Danyaya – 1957–1961
15. Ibrahim Gurama – 1963–1977
16. Yunusa Muhammad Danyaya – 1978–2024
17. Haruna Yunusa Danyaya – 2024–Today

== Notable people ==
- Idi Othman Guda, Senator, Bauchi Central Constituency
- Abdul Ahmed Ningi, Senator, representing Bauchi Central
