= Bibliography of Duwamish (tribe) =

The Duwamish tribe is a Native American tribe in western Washington, and the indigenous people of metropolitan Seattle. The Duwamish tribe today includes the People of the Inside (Dx^{w}'Dəw?Abš), for Elliott Bay environs today; and the People of the Large Lake (Xacuabš), for those around Lake Washington of today.

Includes the sources referenced in Cheshiahud (Lake John) and History of Seattle before white settlement.

- "Alki". Seattle City Clerk's Neighborhood Map Atlas. Office of the Seattle City Clerk. 2002-06-15. Archived from the original on 2007-09-29.
- Anderson, Ross; Green, Sara Jean (2001-05-27). "A culture slips away". Seattle History: 150 Years: Seattle By and By. The Seattle Times. p. 1. Archived from the original on 7 May 2006.
  and Ibid (2001-05-27). "The settlers saw trees, endless trees. The natives saw the spaces between the trees". Seattle History: 150 Years: Seattle By and By. The Seattle Times. p. 2. Archived from the original on 18 May 2006.
- "Area 4". Seattle City Clerk's Neighborhood Map Atlas. Office of the Seattle City Clerk. 2002-06-17.
  Map is NE Seattle around Sand Point-Magnuson Park, for which there is no common name.
- Barber, Mike (2000-07-21). "500 gather at Daybreak Star center to honor Northwest Indian leader". Seattle Post-Intelligencer.
- Bates, Dawn; Hess, Thom; Hilbert, Vi (1994). Bates, Dawn (ed.). Lushootseed dictionary. map by Dassow, Laura. Seattle and London: University of Washington Press. ISBN 0-295-97323-4.
  Completely reformatted, greatly revised and expanded update of Hess, Thom, Dictionary of Puget Salish (University of Washington Press, 1976).
- "Beach Life". Camp Long School Nature Programs. Seattle Parks and Recreation. 2006-03-19. Archived from the original on 18 May 2006.
- "Beach Life (low tide days April–August)". Camp Long School Nature Programs. Seattle Parks and Recreation. 2006-03-09. Archived from the original on 18 May 2006.
  Also Me-Kwa-Mooks Park (update 24 September 2004), Seattle Parks and Recreation.
- Beck, Mary Giraudo (1993). Potlatch: native ceremony and myth on the Northwest Coast. Anchorage: Alaska Northwest Books. ISBN 0-88240-440-7.
- Billings, Molly (February 2005). "The Influenza Pandemic of 1918". Human Virology at Stanford. Stanford University. Archived from the original on 22 April 2006.
  Same as "The Influenza Pandemic of 1918"
- Bounds, Ken (2001-06-13). "News and Views From The Superintendent". View Number 16. Seattle Parks and Recreation. p. NEW PARKS, NEW VISTAS. Archived from the original on 2006-10-01.
  A periodic electronic newsletter
- Boyd, Robert (1999). The Coming of the Spirit of Pestilence: Introduced Infectious Diseases and Population Decline Among Northwest Coast Indians, 1774-1874. Seattle and Vancouver: University of Washington Press and University of British Columbia Press. ISBN 0-295-97837-6.
- Brown, Dee Alexander (1970). Bury my heart at Wounded Knee: an Indian history of the American West. New York: H. Holt. ISBN 978-0-8050-6634-0.
- Buerge, David. "Chief Seattle and Chief Joseph: From Indians to Icons". American Indians of the Pacific Northwest. University of Washington Libraries: Digital Collections. Archived from the original on 2006-06-04.
- Castro, Hector; Barber, Mike (2001-01-20). "After decades, Duwamish tribe wins federal recognition: Now they have it, but it doesn't mean fishing rights". Seattle Post-Intelligencer. Archived from the original on 2001-12-23.
- "Chudups John and others in a canoe on Lake Union, Seattle, ca. 1885". Seattle Historical Society Collection. University of Washington Digital Collections. c. 1885. Archived from the original (JPEG from silver gelatin print) on 2007-01-06.
  Negative Number: SHS 2228, Museum of History and Industry, Seattle .
- Cole, Douglas and Chaikin, Ira (1990). An iron hand upon the people: the law against the potlatch on the Northwest coast. Vancouver and Seattle: Douglas & McIntyre and University of Washington Press. ISBN 0-295-97050-2.
- Crowley, Walt; Wilma, David (2003-02-23). "Federal Judge George Boldt issues historic ruling affirming Native American treaty fishing rights on February 12, 1974". HistoryLink Essay 5282. Archived from the original on 10 July 2006.
  Authors referenced Daniel Jack Chasan, The Water Link: A History of Puget Sound as a Resource (Seattle: University of Washington Press, 1981);
  The Gale Encyclopedia of Native American Tribes ed. by Sharon Malinowsky, Anna Sheets, Jeffrey Lehman, Melissa Walsh Doig (Detroit: Gale, 1998), 285;
  Fay G. Cohen, Treaties on Trial: the Continuing Controversy over Northwest Indian Fishing Rights (Seattle: University of Washington Press, 1986).
- Dailey, Tom (2006-06-14). "Duwamish-Seattle". Coast Salish Villages of Puget Sound.
  Page links to Village Descriptions Duwamish-Seattle section .
  Dailey referenced "Puget Sound Geography" by T. T. Waterman. Washington DC: National Anthropological Archives, mss. [n.d.] [ref. 2];
  Duwamish et al. vs. United States of America, F-275. Washington DC: US Court of Claims, 1927. [ref. 5];
  "Indian Lake Washington" by David Buerge in the Seattle Weekly, 1–7 August 1984 [ref. 8];
  "Seattle Before Seattle" by David Buerge in the Seattle Weekly, 17–23 December 1980. [ref. 9];
  The Puyallup-Nisqually by Marian W. Smith. New York: Columbia University Press, 1940. [ref. 10].
  Recommended start is "Coast Salish Villages of Puget Sound" .
- "Decatur". Dictionary of American Naval Fighting Ships. Department of the Navy, Navy Historical Center. Archived from the original on 2004-03-01.
- "Delridge Open Space Acquisitions". PRO PARKS PROJECT INFORMATION. Seattle Parks and Recreation. 2005-11-08. Archived from the original on 2006-09-21.
- Denny, Orion O. (c. 1904). "Duwamish man and woman known as Old Tom and Madeline, Portage Bay, Seattle, Washington, ca. 1904" (JPEG from photograph). General Indian Collection no. 564. University of Washington Digital Collections.
  Negative Number: NA591
- Dorpat, Paul (May 2002) [2001-06-18]. "Seattle Neighborhoods: University District -- Thumbnail History". HistoryLink Essay 3380. HistoryLink. Archived from the original on 3 May 2006.
  Dorpat referenced Dorpat, Seattle: Now and Then Vols. 1, 2, and 3. Seattle: Tartu Publications, 1984, 1988;
  Walt Crowley and Paul Dorpat, "The Ave: Streetcars to Street Fairs", typescript dated 1995 in possession of Walt Crowley and Paul Dorpat, Seattle, Washington;
  Walt Crowley, Rites of Passage. Seattle: University of Washington Press, 1995;
  Cal McCune, From Romance to Riot: A Seattle Memoir. Seattle: Cal McCune, 1996;
  Roy Nielsen, UniverCity: The City Within City: The Story of the University District Seattle: University Lions Foundation, ca. 1986;
  Clark Humphrey, Loser: the Real Seattle Music Story. Portland, OR: Feral House, 1995.
- Eskenazi, Stuart (2002-05-14). "Duwamish mull next move". Local News. The Seattle Times.
- Furtwangler, Albert (1997). Answering Chief Seattle. Seattle and London: University of Washington Press. ISBN 0-295-97633-0.
- Gibbs, George (1967) [1877]. Indian tribes of Washington Territory. Fairfield, Washington: Galleon Press.
- Green, Sara Jean (2001-07-26). "At her four-day birthday celebration, Vi Hilbert gives the gifts - stories of Puget Sound's first culture". The Seattle Times. Archived from the original on 10 May 2006.
- Harmon, Alexandra (1996). "Puget Sound Tribes". In Hoxie, Frederick E. (ed.). Encyclopedia of North American Indians. Boston: Houghton Mifflin. pp. 522–4. ISBN 0-395-66921-9.
- Hilbert, Vi (1991). "When Chief Seattle (Si'al) Spoke". In Wright, Robin K. (ed.). A Time of gathering: native heritage in Washington State. Seattle: Burke Museum: University of Washington Press. ISBN 978-0-295-96819-3.
  Highly regarded.
- "History, Me-Kwa-Mooks Park". Seattle Parks and Recreation. 2004-09-24.
- "History - Pre-Euro American Settlement". Warren G. Magnuson Park. Seattle Parks and Recreation. 2005-11-22. Archived from the original on 2007-09-29.
- "History of United Indians of All Tribes Foundation". United Indians of All Tribes. 2003. Archived from the original on 2006-02-15.
- Holm, Tom (Cherokee, Creek) (1996). "Warriors and warfare". In Hoxie, Frederick E. (ed.). Encyclopedia of North American Indians. Boston: Houghton Mifflin. pp. 666–8. ISBN 0-395-66921-9.
- "Industrial-District". Seattle City Clerk's Neighborhood Map Atlas. 2002-06-15. Archived from the original on 2007-09-29.
  Maps "NN-1120S", "NN-1130S", "NN-1140S".Jpg [sic] dated 13 June; "NN-1030S", "NN-1040S".jpg dated 17 June 2002.
- Ith, Ian (2004-10-03). "The Road Back: From Seattle's Superfund Sewer to Haven Once More". Pacific Northwest magazine. Reese, Tom, photographer. The Seattle Times. Archived from the original on 6 July 2006.
  Good photos
- Ith, Ian (2004-10-01). "The Road Back: From Seattle's Superfund sewer to haven once more". Pacific Northwest Magazine. The Seattle Times.
- Kamb, Lewis (2004-10-25). "Duwamish chairwoman honored for championing her tribe's cause". Seattle Post-Intelligencer.
- Kamb, Lewis (2004-03-29). "Duwamish long for longhouse; tribe has land, just need a little more money". Seattle Post-Intelligencer.
- Speer, Thomas R., ed. (2004-07-22). "Chief Si'ahl". Duwamish Tribe. Archived from the original (DOC) on 2006-06-23.
  Includes bibliography.
  Original no longer available. As of 2009-04-09 a similar web page is at https://web.archive.org/web/20090213151404/http://duwamishtribe.org/chiefsiahl.html. Versions of the original are archived at https://web.archive.org/web/*/http://www.duwamishtribe.org/html/chief_si_ahl.html. The doc is archived at https://web.archive.org/web/20080119214434/http://www.duwamishtribe.org/Life_siahl.doc.
- Lange, Greg; Tate, Cassandra (1998-11-04). "Legislature incorporates the Town of Seattle for the first time on January 14, 1865". HistoryLink.org Essay 168. HistoryLink.
- Lange, Greg (2000-10-15). "Seattle and King County's First White Settlers". HistoryLink.org Essay 1660. HistoryLink. Archived from the original on 7 May 2006.
- Lange, Greg (4 February 2003) [8 December 2000]. "Smallpox Epidemic of 1862 among Northwest Coast and Puget Sound Indians". HistoryLink.org Essay 5171. Archived from the original on 25 June 2006.
  Lange referenced a very extensive list.
  Summary article
  - Lange, Greg (2000-12-08). "Smallpox kills 14,000 Northwest Coast Indians from April to December 1862". HistoryLink.org Essay 3176.
    Lange referenced Lange, "Smallpox Epidemic of 1862 among Northwest Coast and Puget Sound Indians" , HistoryLink.org Online Encyclopedia of Washington State History. Accessed 8 December 2000.
- Long, Priscilla (2001-01-20). "Duwamish Tribe wins federal recognition on January 19, 2001, but loses it again two days later". HistoryLink.org Essay 2951.
  Long referenced Hector Castro and Mike Barber, "After Decades, Duwamish Tribe Wins Federal Recognition", Seattle Post-Intelligencer January 20, 2001, (www.seattlep-i.com);
  Bernard McGhee, "Duwamish Tribe Wins Recognition", The Seattle Times, January 20, 2001, (www.seattletimes.com);
  Bureau of Indian Affairs, "BIA Issues Final Determination on the Recognition of the Duwamish Tribal Organization", News Release, January 19, 2001 (https://web.archive.org/web/20060901062007/http://www.doi.gov/bia/);
  Sara Jeanne Greene, "Chief Seattle's Tribe Clings to its Identity", The Seattle Times, June 18, 2001 (www.seattletimes.com);
  Susan Gilmore, "Duwamish Denied Tribal Status", Ibid., September 29, 2001 ().
  Note: This file was revised on 3 August 2001 and again on 20 January 2001.
- McDonald, Cathy (2004-05-13). "Walkabout: Terminal 107 / Kellogg Island Trail". Travel / Outdoors. The Seattle Times: Seattle History. Archived from the original on September 22, 2004.
- McRoberts, Patrick; Oldham, Kit (2003-08-15). "Fort Lawton military police clash with Native American and other protesters in the future Discovery Park on March 8, 1970". HistoryLink.org Essay 5513.
- Miller, Jay (Lenape) (1996). "Seattle (Si'al)". In Hoxie, Frederick E. (ed.). Encyclopedia of North American Indians. Boston: Houghton Mifflin. pp. 574–6. ISBN 0-395-66921-9.
- Morgan, Murray (1982) [1951]. Skid Road: an Informal Portrait of Seattle (revised and updated, first illustrated ed.). Seattle and London: University of Washington Press. pp. 20–54. ISBN 0-295-95846-4.
- Nodell, Bobbi (2002-09-01). "Duwamish take to canoes in celebration of their past". The Seattle Times.
- Payton, Charles (March 2000). "Native American Resources of King County". King County Historic Preservation Program (Technical Paper No. 19): 4. Archived from the original on 20 June 2006.
  Office of Business Relations and Economic Development
- "The people and their land". Puget Sound Native Art and Culture. Seattle Art Museum. 2003-07-04.
- "Reproduction & Use Policies". University of Washington Libraries, Digital Collections. n.d. Archived from the original on December 28, 2004.
- Rochester, Junius (2002-11-20) [2001-06-09]. "Seattle Neighborhoods: Laurelhurst -- Thumbnail History". HistoryLink.org Essay 3345. Archived from the original on 5 May 2006.
  Rochester referenced Christine Barrett, A History of Laurelhurst (Seattle, WA: Laurelhurst Community Club, 1981, revised 1989);
  Paul Dorpat, Seattle: Now & Then, Vols. II and III (Seattle, WA: Tartu Publications, 1984 and 1989);
  Lucile Saunders McDonald, The Lake Washington Story, (Seattle, WA: Superior Publishing Co., 1979);
  Brandt Morgan, Enjoying Seattle's Parks (Seattle, WA: Greenwood Publications, 1979);
  Harry W. Higman and Earl J. Larrison, Union Bay: The Life of a City Marsh, (Seattle, WA: University of Washington Press, 1951);
  J. Willis Sayre, This City of Ours (Seattle, WA: Seattle School District No. 1, 1936);
  Sophie Frye Bass, Pig-Tail Days in Old Seattle (Portland, OR: Binfords & Mort, 1937);
  Roger Sale, Seattle: Past to Present (Seattle, WA: University of Washington Press, 1976).
- * Roxberger, Daniel L. (1994). "Sovereignty". In Davis, Mary B. (ed.). Native America in the twentieth century: an encyclopedia. Vol. Garland reference library of social science, v. 452. New York: Garland. pp. 172–3.
- Sheridan, Mimi; Tobin, Carol (2001-07-17). Wilma, David (ed.). "Seattle Neighborhoods: Licton Springs -- Thumbnail History". HistoryLink.org Essay 3447.
  Authors referenced an extensive list, most of them primary sources. See the Bibliography at Licton Springs or Northgate for a complete reference.
- Shukovsky, Paul (2002-05-11). "Decision is death knell for Duwamish: Bush administration reaffirms earlier ruling that tribe is extinct". Seattle Post-Intelligencer.
- Shukovsky, Paul (1996-03-22). "Metcalf Would Block Tribal Recognition". Seattle Post-Intelligencer. p. News, p. C1.
- "Southern Coast Salish Territories". "Maps", "American Indians of the Pacific Northwest Collection", "Libraries Home > Subject > History > Tm > Pacific Northwest History". University of Washington Libraries, Digital Collections. Archived from the original on 2006-06-18.
- Speer, Thomas R. (2004). "Duwamish history and culture". from "Dkhw'Duw'Absh, 'People of the Inside'". Duwamish Tribe. Archived from the original on 2006-04-03.
- Speidel, William C. ("Bill") (1978). Doc Maynard: the man who invented Seattle. Seattle: Nettle Creek Publishing Company. pp. 196–197, 200. ISBN 0-914890-02-6.
  Speidel provides a substantial bibliography with extensive primary sources.
- Speidel, William C. (1967). Sons of the profits; or, There's no business like grow business: the Seattle story, 1851-1901. Seattle: Nettle Creek Publishing Company. pp. 196–197, 200. ISBN 978-0-914890-00-3.
  Speidel provides a substantial bibliography with extensive primary sources.
- Suttle, Wayne P.; Lane, Barbara (1990-08-20). "South Coast Salish". In Sturtevant, William C. (ed.). Handbook of North American Indians. Vol. 7. Northwest coast. Washington: Smithsonian Institution. pp. 485–500. ISBN 0-16-020390-2. (v. 7).
- Sykes, Karen (2005-01-13). "Hike Of The Week: Urban trail is a tribute to man and nature". Take a hike. The Seattle Post-Intelligencer.
- Talbert, Paul (2006-05-01). "SkEba'kst: The Lake People and Seward Park". The History of Seward Park. SewardPark.org. Archived from the original on 2005-12-14.
- Tate, Cassandra (2001-07-08). "Seattle Neighborhoods: West Seattle -- Thumbnail History". HistoryLink.org Essay 3428. Archived from the original on 28 April 2006.
  Tate referenced an autobiographical sketch by Arthur Denny found in William Farrand Prosser, A History of the Puget Sound Country; Its Resources, Its Commerce and Its People (New York: The Lewis Publishing Company, 1903);
  West Side Story ed. by Clay Eals (Seattle: Robinson Newspapers, 1987);
  [No author, title]. Olympia Columbian, June 4, 1853;
  Alexandra Harmon, Indians in the Making: Ethnic Relations and Indian Identities around Puget Sound (Berkeley: University of California Press, 1998);
  [No author, title]. Seattle Post-Intelligencer, December 21, 1996;
  Walt Crowley, National Trust Guide: Seattle (New York: John Wiley & Sons, Inc., 1998);
  [No author, title]. West Seattle News, May 15, 1903;
  [No author, title]. West Seattle Herald, February 2, 1924;
  [No author, title]. Seattle Post-Intelligencer, March 7, 1998; Ibid., November 13, 2000;
  [No author, title]. The Seattle Times, October 20, 1997;
  Ibid., February 24, 1998;
  Ibid., May 26, 2000;
  Albert Furtwangler, Answering Chief Seattle (Seattle: University of Washington Press, 1997);
  [No author, title]. Seattle Press-Times, March 7, 1893;
  Jane Wilson MacGowan, "Gully, Cove Fill Childhood with Memories", Neighbors, Spring 2000;
  [No author]. West Seattle Memories: Alki (Seattle: Southwest Seattle Historical Society, 1999);
  Brandt Morgan, Enjoying Seattle's Parks (Westport, CT: Greenwood Publications, 1979);
  Deborah Bach, "Indians Are Out, Wildcats Are In at West Seattle High", Seattle Post-Intelligencer, April 25, 2003.
- "University District". Seattle City Clerk's Neighborhood Map Atlas. Office of the Seattle City Clerk. 13 June 2002.
- Webster, Ira; Stevens, Nelson (c. 1905). "Salmon Bay Charlie's house at Shilshole with canoe anchored offshore, ca. 1905" (JPEG from glass negative, previously taped, slightly sulfided). PEMCO Webster & Stevens Collection. University of Washington Digital Collections.
  Negative Number: MOHAI 83.10.9,067
- Wilma, David (2001-01-29). "Descendants of pioneers reverse the stand of their ancestors and support federal recognition of the Duwamish tribe on June 18, 1988". HistoryLink.org Essay 2956.
  Wilma referenced "Petition: To the Honorable Arthur A. Denny, Delegate to Congress from Washington Territory," n.d., National Archives Roll 909, "Letters Received by the Office of Indian Affairs, 1824-81";
  Pioneer Association of the State of Washington, "A Petition to Support Recognition of The Duwamish Indians as a 'Tribe', June 18, 1988, in possession of Ken Tollefson, Seattle, Washington.
- Wilma, David (2001-03-28). "Seattle Neighborhoods: Lakewood -- Thumbnail History". HistoryLink.org Essay 3140.
  Wilma referenced "Lakewood Community Club", brochure, 1948, Rainier Valley Historical Society, Seattle;
  David Buerge, "Indian Lake Washington", The Weekly, August 1, 1984, pp. 29–33;
  Don Sherwood, "Seward Park - Graham Peninsula", "Interpretive Essays on the History of Seattle Parks", handwritten bound manuscript dated 1977, Seattle Room, Seattle Public Library;
  Don Sherwood, "Genessee P.F., Wetmore Slough", Ibid.;
  Don Sherwood, "Stanley S. Sayres Memorial Park", Ibid.;
  "Cougar captured near Lake Washington about February 23, 1870", Timeline Library, (www.Historylink.org);
  Paul Dorpat, Seattle Now and Then, (Seattle: Tartu Publications, 1984), 82;
  Lucile B. McDonald, The Lake Washington Story, (Seattle: Superior Publishing Co., 1979), 23, 87, 88;
  Redick H. McKee, Road Map of Seattle and Vicinity, 1890, Seattle Public Library;
  "Guide Map of the City of Seattle, Washington Territory", ca. 1888, brochure, Seattle Public Library;
  David Wilma Interview with Grover Haynes, president, Lakewood-Seward Park Community Club, March 31, 2001, Seattle, Washington.
- Wilma, David (2001-01-24). "Seattle pioneers petition against a reservation on the Black River for the Duwamish tribe in 1866". HistoryLink.org Essay 2955. Archived from the original on 2 May 2006.
  Wilma referenced "Petition: To the Honorable Arthur A. Denny, Delegate to Congress from Washington Territory," n.d., National Archives Roll 909, "Letters Received by the Office of Indian Affairs, 1824-81";
  Pioneer Association of the State of Washington, "A Petition to Support Recognition of The Duwamish Indians as a 'Tribe', June 18, 1988, in possession of Ken Tollefson, Seattle, Washington.
- Wilse, Anders B. (1897–1900). "Indian encampment on Ballast Island at the Seattle waterfront, ca. 1900" (JPEG from Silver gelatin print). Wilse Collection. University of Washington Digital Collections.
  Negative Number: MOHAI 90.45.14, Museum of History and Industry, Seattle
