= Town of Seattle Ordinance No. 5 =

1865 anti-Native American ordinance

Ordinance No. 5

Board of Trustees of the Town of Seattle
- Long title: An Ordinance for the Removal of Indians
- Territorial extent: Seattle, Washington Territory
- Enacted: February 7, 1865
- Signed by: Charles C. Terry
- Date of expiry: January 18, 1867

Summary
- Expels Native Americans from Seattle unless employed and housed by settlers
- Status: Void

Shortly after the settlement's first incorporation in 1865, the Board of Trustees of the Town of Seattle, Washington Territory, passed Ordinance No. 5, subtitled An Ordinance for the Removal of Indians, expelling all Native Americans from residence in the town unless employed and housed by a white settler. Instituted on February 7, 1865, the ordinance banned all Native Americans from living within the town limits of Seattle unless employed by a settler and housed immediately adjacent to their employer.

While the law was enforced by the Town Marshal, it was ultimately unsuccessful at driving the Duwamish from Seattle. Many moved to settlements immediately outside the town limits. The ordinance was ultimately rendered void following the disincorporation of Seattle by petition in January 1867. It was not reinstated when Seattle reincorporated as a city in 1869, although other anti-indigenous legislation continued.

== Background ==
Previously part of the disputed and largely unsettled Oregon Country, territory inhabited by the Duwamish people fell under direct American colonial settlement in 1851, following two settlement parties led by Arthur Denny and Luther Collins. The American settlers, referred to as "Bostons" by the Duwamish, were on initially relatively good relations with the native peoples. Natives and settlers worked together, and some intermarriages between settler men and native women occurred. However, settlers increasingly began seeing natives with disdain. Three settlers were acquitted for the lynching of a Duwamish man, Mesatchie Jim. This led to a cycle of violence between settlers and natives, leading to vigilante killings of both settlers and natives.

Instituted by territorial governor Isaac Stevens, the 1855 Treaty of Point Elliott attempted to force the Duwamish into the Suquamish reservation. It was signed by Seattle, chief of the Duwamish and Suquamish, who had maintained amicable relationships with early settlers and ultimately became the namesake of the new settlement. However, the treaty was not ratified by Congress for several years. During this period, the Puget Sound War broke out over treaty disagreements. Seattle stayed neutral in this conflict and evacuated many Duwamish to the Suquamish reservation prior to the 1856 Battle of Seattle.

Most Duwamish returned to their territory adjacent to the town of Seattle by the end of 1856. Local and territorial government repeatedly attempted to displace them from the isthmus, in order to achieve full control over land and resources, as well as to maintain the segregation of races.

== Ordinance ==
The ordinance was part of an initial slate of five ordinances by the newly formed Board of Trustees of the Town of Seattle, all signed by board president Charles C. Terry on February 7, 1865. Ordinance No. 5 was divided into three sections. The first prohibited any Native American from residing in any "street, highway, lane, or alley, or vacant lot" in the Town of Seattle, a territory then defined by the property lines of Charles Plummer to the south and William Nathaniel Bell to the north. The second section carved out an exception for natives employed by settlers if housing was provided "on, or immediately attached to their own place of residence". The third section entrusted enforcement of the act to the Town Marshal.

Provisions to allow for continued Native American workers were outlined due to their crucial status to period settlements in the region. The Town of Seattle, and its corresponding ordinances, were abolished on January 18, 1867, after a widespread public petition calling for disincorporation. It was reincorporated as the City of Seattle in 1869. While Ordinance No. 5 was never re-instated, similar anti-indigenous measures remained in effect, such as an 1866 ban of marriages between natives and whites and repeated pressure against the creation of a Duwamish reservation by Seattle settlers.

== Impact ==
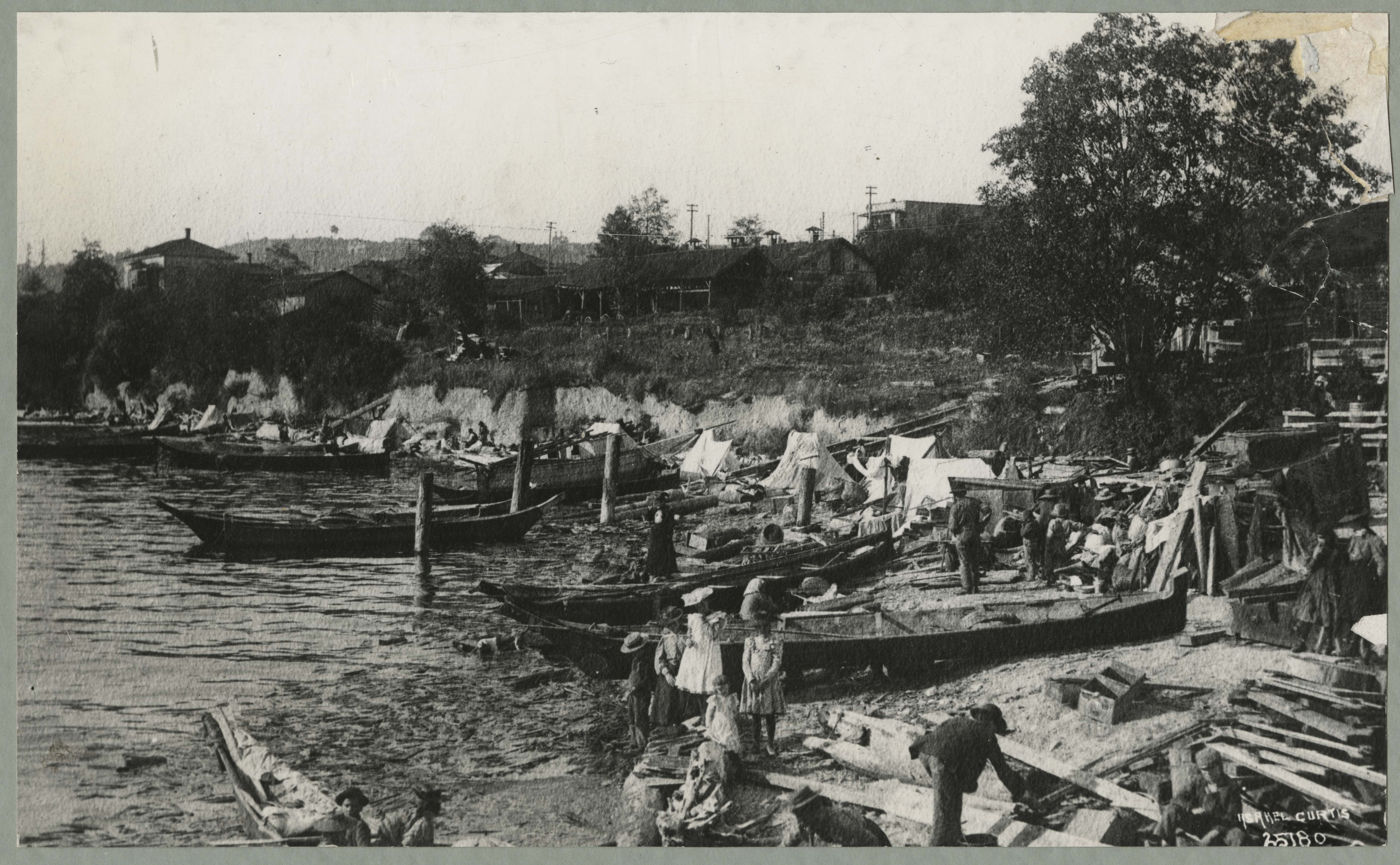
Native Americans and canoes at the Belltown coast, c. 1898

Despite its intentions, the ordinance was not completely successful in driving Native Americans from the town of Seattle. Native presence in and around the city continued, with one observer claiming to have seen Chief Seattle himself within the bounds of the city in 1865.

Many Duwamish living within the bounds of Seattle sought refugee at babaqʷəb, in what is now the Belltown neighborhood of downtown Seattle. Traditionally a winter village, two longhouses were located at the site, occupied for salal berry collection and salmon fishing. During the enforcement period of Ordinance No. 5, it was the closest village site where the Duwamish were allowed to reside. Even after the repeal, the area served as a refuge for the displaced Duwamish. Tents and cabins were erected along the beach by the 1880s. Other Duwamish settled at Herring's House (Lushootseed: t̓uʔəlaltxʷ) at the Duwamish delta, although they were later displaced outside of city limits by arson attacks.

== Legacy ==
In anticipation of the 150th anniversary of the ordinance's passage on February 7, 2015, the Metropolitan King County Council passed a resolution recognizing February 7 as Native American Expulsion Remembrance Day, stating that the 1865 ordinance was one of "a series of actions by Seattle's city government and residents" that harmed indigenous peoples. The resolution was praised by local indigenous activists.

== Works cited ==
- Klingle, Matthew (2007). Emerald City: An Environmental History of Seattle. The Lamar Series in Western History. New Haven: Yale University Press. doi:10.2307/j.ctt1npdq8. ISBN 978-0-300-11641-0. JSTOR j.ctt1npdq8.
- O'Malley, Corey Susan (2017). Categorization in Motion: Duwamish Identity, 1792-1934 (PhD thesis). University of California Los Angeles. ProQuest 1965264526.
- Ruby, Robert H. (2010). A Guide to the Indian tribes of the Pacific Northwest. Norman: University of Oklahoma Press. ISBN 978-0-8061-4024-7.
- Thrush, Coll (2017). Native Seattle: Histories from the Crossing-Over Place. Weyerhaeuser Environmental Books (2 ed.). Seattle: University of Washington Press. ISBN 978-0-295-74133-8. JSTOR j.ctvcwnvq3. Archived from the original on February 1, 2024.
- Williams, David B. (2015). Too High and Too Steep: Reshaping Seattle's Topography. Seattle: University of Washington Press. ISBN 978-0-295-99504-5. JSTOR j.ctvcwnk3t. Archived from the original on February 1, 2024.
