= Duwamish Tribe =

Cultural organization in Washington state

Duwamish Tribe Duwamish Tribal Services
- Named after: Duwamish people
- Formation: 1925
- Founded at: Seattle, Washington
- Type: Unrecognized tribal organization
- Legal status: Not federally recognized or state recognized
- Location: United States
- Official language: English
- Chairwoman: Cecile Hansen
- Website: duwamishtribe.org

The Duwamish Tribe, officially known as the Duwamish Tribal Organization, is a Seattle-based organization of Duwamish people (Lushootseed: dxʷdəwʔabš), and those who identify as their descendants. The organization is currently neither a federally recognized tribe nor a state-recognized tribe.

The Duwamish Tribe has sought federal acknowledgment as the Duwamish Indian Tribe several times. The Bureau of Indian Affairs currently lists the petition as supplementing its documented petition under the 2015 acknowledgment regulations.

In 2022, the Duwamish Tribe filed a lawsuit against the US Department of Interior (DOI) in a US District Court seeking a judicial declaration that they were federally recognized. In 2025, the court ordered the DOI to reconsider the Tribe's petition for federal recognition under the 2015 regulations.

The Duwamish Tribe has operated the Duwamish Tribal Services since 1983, a nonprofit dedicated to serving the needs of their members.

== History ==
=== Historical context ===
In the mid-nineteenth century, when Euro-American settlers began arriving, the Duwamish Valley and Elliott Bay had at least 17 Duwamish villages.

The Duwamish were one of the signatory tribes of the 1855 Treaty of Point Elliott. Under this treaty, the Duwamish and other peoples ceded their land to the United States. In return, among other things, the Duwamish were promised the creation of a reservation for their people, as well as fishing and hunting rights. Although the Suquamish Reservation was established with the expectation that the Duwamish would move there, many Duwamish people chose to remain in their homelands near Seattle.

In 1856, at the Fox Island Council, then-Territorial Governor Isaac Stevens agreed to create the Muckleshoot Reservation, a reservation for all the peoples continuing to live on the Duwamish River watershed (including the Green and White rivers), as part of efforts to relocate the Duwamish and others. Although many did move to the reservation, many Duwamish continued to resist moving.

In 1866, the Superintendent of Indian Affairs proposed the creation of another reservation in Duwamish homelands. Many early Seattle settlers opposed the proposal, including David Denny, Henry Yesler, and David "Doc" Maynard. petitioned against it, writing "such a reservation would do a great injustice" and be "of little value to the Indians." The proposed reservation was not established after settlers objected.

=== Formation of the modern organization ===
In 1925, the Duwamish Tribe drafted a constitution and bylaws for their new organization.The people in the tribe comprised mostly (71%) descendants of marriages between pioneer men and Duwamish women.

== Petitions for federal recognition ==
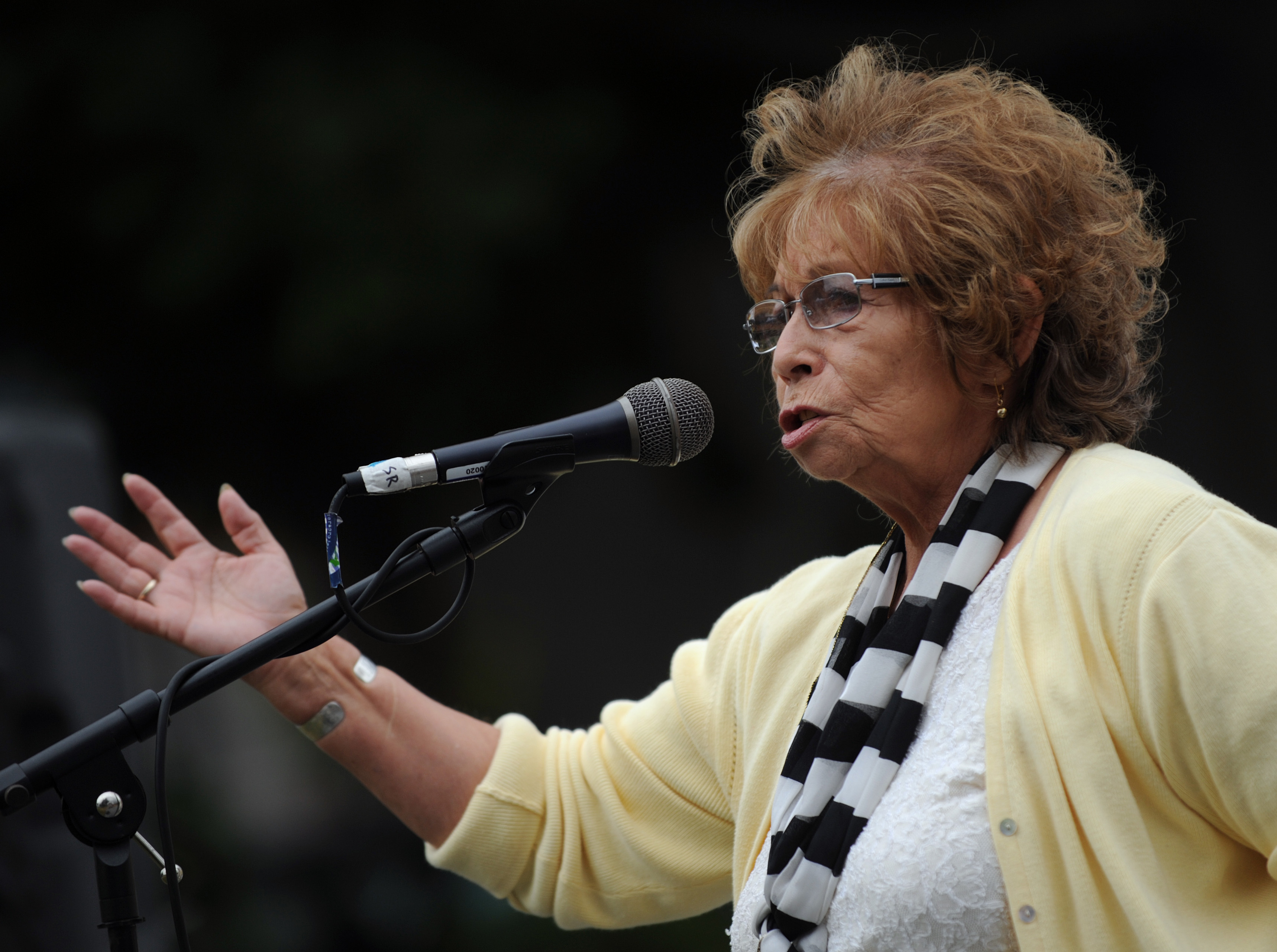
Cecile A. Hansen, Chairwoman of the Duwamish Tribe, speaks at the 5th Annual Duwamish River Festival

=== 1977 letter of intent and 1996 proposed finding ===
The Duwamish Tribe has petitioned the US Department of the Interior for federal recognition several times. They first submitted their letter of intent in 1977; however, the petition was denied in 1996. The 1977 petition was evaluated under the 1978 criteria, rather than the revised 1994 criteria. In the proposed finding, the Department concluded that the petitioner satisfied some acknowledgment criteria but did not satisfy others. The proposed finding treated the Duwamish Tribal Organization as an organization formed in Organization as an organization formed in 1925; it found that the DTO was not a continuation of an earlier Duwamish political entity.

=== 1988 Pioneer Association support petition ===
In June 1988, 72 descendants of early Washington settlers reversed their ancestors' petition against a Duwamish Reservation and petitioned the Bureau of Indian Affairs in support of federal recognition of the Duwamish Tribe. The signers were members of the Pioneer Association of the State of Washington, which maintains Pioneer Hall in Madison Park as a meeting hall and archive of pioneer records.

=== 2001 recognition and reversal ===
In January 2001, the Duwamish Tribe briefly received federal acknowledgment, but the decision was suspended shortly afterward during the transition to the George W. Bush administration and later reversed.

=== 2013 remand and 2015 final decision ===
In March 2013, Federal Judge John C. Coughenour granted summary judgement in Hansen et al v. Salazar ordering the Department of Interior to reconsider or explain the denial of the Tribe's petition; however, they were denied two years later in July, stating that they do not meet the criteria for federal recognition.

=== Congressional recognition bill ===
In 2015, Representative Jim McDermott introduced a bill (HR 2176) to extend federal recognition to the Duwamish Tribe; however, no actions were taken on the bill after its introduction.

=== 2022 lawsuit and 2025 remand ===
In May 2022, the Duwamish Tribe and Cecile Hansen filed a federal lawsuit against Secretary of the Interior Deb Haaland and the Bureau of Indian Affairs, challenging the Department's handling of the recognition petition. The complaint alleged, among other claims, that the federal acknowledgment process had disadvantaged the organization by undervaluing descent through Duwamish women who married non-Native settler men.

On January 1, 2025, Federal District Judge Jamal N. Whitehead ordered the DOI to reopen the Tribe's Federal Acknowledgment Process record, reconsider their petition under the 2015 acknowledgment regulations, and accept the Tribe's new and supplemental evidence. In the remand order, the district court noted that the 2015 acknowledgment regulations differ from earlier rules by allowing some evidence of self-identification, limiting the community and political-authority review period to 1900 onward, and allowing evidence of patterned out-marriages.

=== Current BIA petition status ===
As of May 2026, the Bureau of Indian Affairs lists Petition #025 for the Duwamish Indian Tribe as "Supplementing Doc. Petition." The BIA page states that the Department is waiting for the petitioner to supplement its documented petition, that the petitioner chose the 2015 acknowledgment regulations, and that the matter is not currently in litigation.

== Duwamish Tribal Services ==
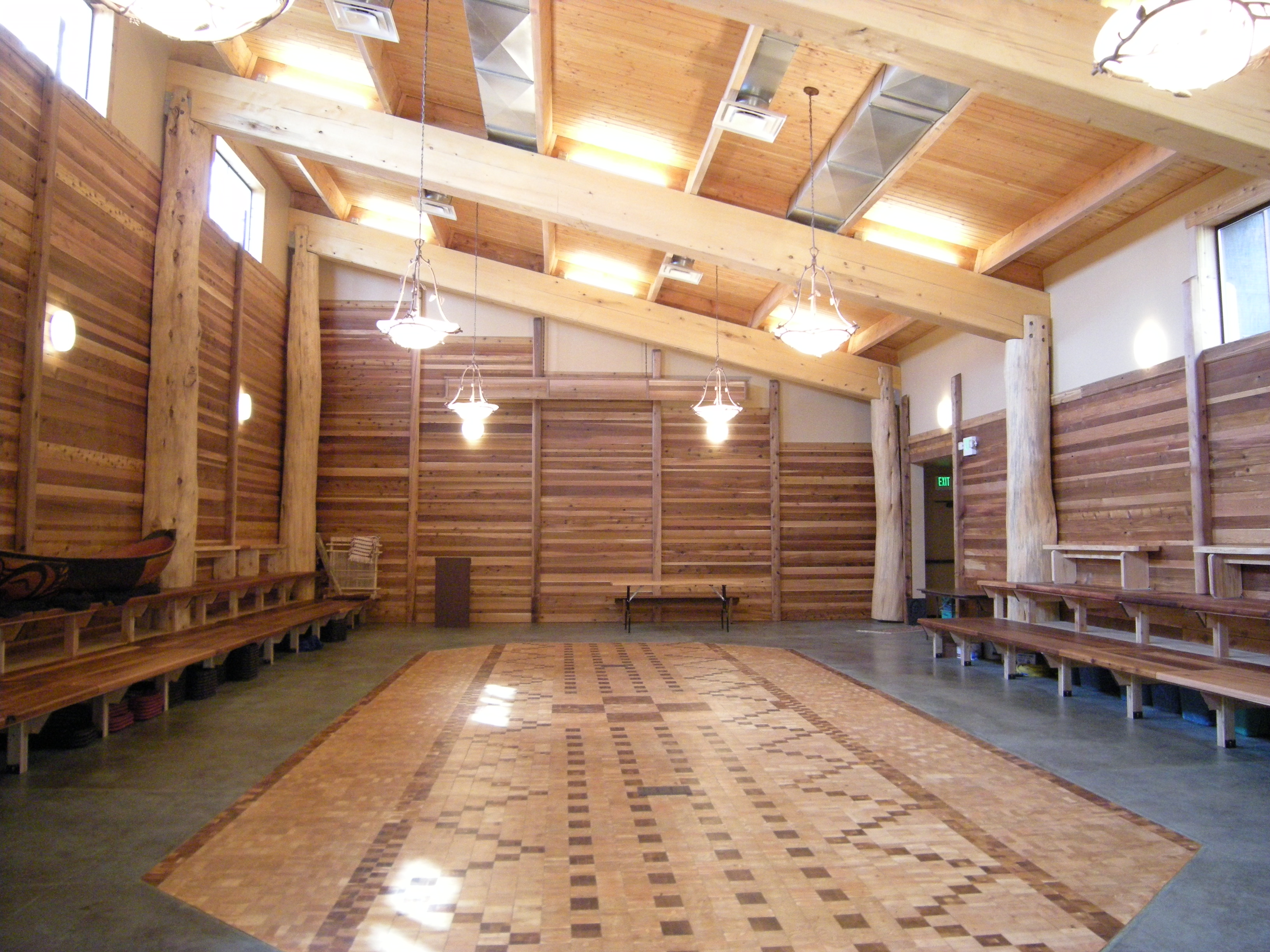
The interior of the Chief Si?ahl Duwamish Longhouse and Cultural Center

The Duwamish Tribal Services was incorporated as a 501(c)(3) nonprofit organization. IRS-derived nonprofit records list the organization's tax-exempt status as beginning in April 1981.

For the fiscal year ending June 2024, Duwamish Tribal Services reported revenue of $4,228,154, expenses of $2,751,088, and net assets of $13,534,836 for Duwamish Tribal Services. The organization previously received grants from institutional sources, including Network for Good and Seattle Pride.

Duwamish Tribal Services owns and operates the Duwamish Longhouse and Cultural Center in Seattle, which functions as a public cultural and community space.

In 2017, non-Native fundraisers created a charity campaign, Real Rent Duwamish, to generate support and income for the organization.

== See also ==
- History of the Duwamish people
- List of federally recognized tribes in the contiguous United States
- List of organizations that self-identify as Native American tribes
- Coast Salish
- Lushootseed
