= Yunusa Muhammad Danyaya =

Former Emir of Ningi

Yunusa Muhammadu Danyaya
- Emir of Ningi

Emir of Ningi
- Reign: 1978 – 25 August 2024
- Successor: Haruna Yunusa Danyaya
- Born: 1936 (age 89–90); Ningi, Northern Region, British Nigeria
- Died: Kano, Kano State, Nigeria
- Burial: Emir's Palace, Ningi, Bauchi State, Nigeria
Names
- Alhaji Yunusa Muhammadu Danyaya
- Occupation: Public Administrator, Traditional Ruler

Alhaji Yunusa Muhammadu Danyaya OON (1936 – 25 August 2024) was a Nigerian public administrator and traditional ruler who served as the Emir of Ningi, a first-class traditional state in Bauchi State, Nigeria. Appointed in 1978, his reign spanned 46 years until his death in August 2024.

== Early life and education ==
Yunusa Muhammadu Danyaya was born in 1936 in Ningi, then part of the Northern Region of British Nigeria. He attended Ningi Elementary School from 1941 to 1946 and Bauchi Middle School between 1946 and 1951. He subsequently enrolled at the School of Hygiene in Kano in 1951.

Between 1956 and 1957, he completed a course in public administration at Ahmadu Bello University (ABU), Zaria. He later pursued further studies at the British Council in Kano (1959–1960) and obtained a Diploma in Public Administration from ABU Zaria in 1962.

== Public service and career ==
Danyaya began his career in public administration within the Ningi Native Authority. He worked as a dispenser at Nasaru Dispensary from 1953 to 1958. During this period, he held various local administrative roles, serving as a member of the Ningi Native Authority Outer Council (1954–1956) and the Ningi Emirate Council (1956–1960). He was appointed Councillor for Medical and Health (1958–1959) and Councillor for Works, Police, and Prisons (1959–1960). In 1959, he was conferred with the traditional title of Chiroman Ningi and appointed District Head.

In 1963, he transitioned to the private sector as a welfare officer at the Nigerian Tobacco Company in Zaria, serving until 1967. He then joined the Northern Nigeria Marketing Board as an Assistant Marketing Officer. Over the following decade, he held administrative positions, including Assistant Manager in Gusau and Kaura Namoda (1968), Groundnut Depot Manager in Maiduguri (1969), Sub-Area Manager for Gombe, Biu, and Kumo (1970), and Acting Area Manager for the North Eastern States Marketing Board in 1976.

In addition to his administrative roles, Danyaya served on public and corporate boards. He was the Acting Chairman of the Board of Directors of Inland Bank Nigeria Plc from 1988 to 1991, a Director at the Hadejia-Jama'are River Basin Development Authority (1989–1991), and Chairman of the Governing Board of the College of Legal and Islamic Studies in Misau, Bauchi State (1996–1999).

== Reign as Emir ==
Following the death of his predecessor, Danyaya was installed as the Emir of Ningi in 1978. In 1998, the Bauchi State Government upgraded the Ningi Emirate to first class status, making him a first-class monarch.

Between 1979 and 1983, he represented the Bauchi State Council of Chiefs on the National Council of States. He served on national bodies including the National Constitutional Conference and the Vision 2010 Traditional Rulers Sub-committee. He also served as the Chairman of the Environmental Health Officers Registration Council of Nigeria and led the Bauchi State Inter Religious Council.

== Death and succession ==
Danyaya died on the morning of 25 August 2024 at a hospital in Kano State, aged 88, two days after returning from a medical trip to Saudi Arabia. His funeral prayer was conducted later that afternoon at the Emir's Palace in Ningi, where he was interred.

On 1 September 2024, the Bauchi State Government appointed his eldest son, Alhaji Haruna Yunusa Danyaya, as the 17th Emir of Ningi.

== Honors ==
- Officer of the Order of the Niger (OON) – National Honors Award conferred by the Federal Republic of Nigeria.

== See also ==
- Ningi, Nigeria
- Bauchi State
- Nigeria
