= Adamu Hashimu Ranga =

Nigerian politician

Adamu Hashimu Ranga is a Nigerian politician and a member of the Nigerian House of Representatives, representing Ningi/Warji Federal Constituency of Bauchi State.
