= Warji =

- LGA and town
- Interactive map of Warji
- Location in Nigeria
- Coordinates: 11°11′0″N 9°45′0″E
- Country: Nigeria
- State: Bauchi State

Government
  - Local Government Chairman: Aminu Barmini
  - House of Representatives Member: Adamu Hashimu Ranga

Area
  - Total: 625 km^{2} (241 sq mi)

Population (2006)
  - Total: 114,720
  - Density: 184/km^{2} (475/sq mi)
- Time zone: UTC+1 (WAT)
- 3-digit postal code prefix: 742

Warji is a Local Government Area of Bauchi State, Nigeria. Its headquarters is in the town of Warji.

It has an area of 625 km^{2} and a population of 114,720 at the 2006 census.

The postal code of the area is 742.

== Climate ==
The weather in Warji fluctuates from oppressive wet season to partly overcast dry season, with temperatures ranging from 13 °C (56 °F) to 39 °C (102 °F), rarely dropping below 10 °C (50 °F) or exceeding 42 °C (107 °F).
