= Cheshiahud =

- Cheslahud
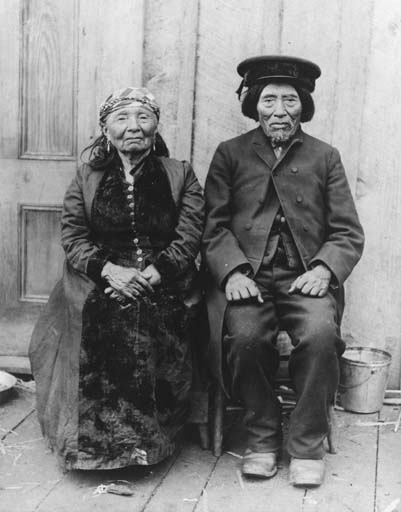
- Old Tom and Madeline at their house on Portage Bay across from today's University of Washington campus. Old Tom was also known as Indian John or Cheshishon, so they are likely also Lake John Cheshiahud and Tleboletsa.

Duwamish tribe leader

Personal details
- Resting place: Evergreen Washelli Memorial Park
- Spouse(s): Sbeilsdot (or Lucy Annie); Tleboletsa (or Madeline)
- Children: Daughter, Jennie (Janey)
- Nickname(s): Lake John Cheshiahud, Chudups John, Old Tom, Indian John, Lake Union John, Cheshishon

Cheshiahud (also Cheslahud, Lake John Cheshiahud, or Chudups John) and his family on Lake Union, Seattle, Washington, in the 1880s are, along with Princess Angeline, among the few late-19th century Dkh^{w}'Duw'Absh (people of the Duwamish tribe) about whom a little is known. In the University of Washington (UW) Library image archives, he is called Chudups John or Lake Union John. His family were among the few of the Duwamish people who did not move from Seattle to the Port Madison Reservation or other reservations. They lived on Portage Bay, part of Lake Union, when a photo was taken around 1885. According to the Duwamish Tribe, Lake John had a cabin and potato patch at the foot of Shelby Street (either West Montlake Park or Roanoke neighborhood, on Portage Bay—sources are not specific). A commemorative plaque of unknown reliability is said to exist at the eastern foot of Shelby. This land was given to him by Seattle pioneer David Denny or the property was purchased—see below. Photographer Orion O. Denny recorded Old Tom and Madeline, c. 1904, further noted in the UW Library archives as Madeline and Old John, also known as Indian John or Cheshishon, who had a house on Portage Bay in the 1900s, south of what is now the UW campus although native people had been prohibited from residence in Seattle since the mid-1860s.

== Before conquest ==
His story is typical of the relatively few natives remaining in Seattle after proscription; the rest moved or died of diseases brought to the region by people of European descent.

In 1854, E. A. Clark owned "a pretentious two-story frame building" near Henry Yesler's sawmill, which he called his "What-Cheer-House". The house was located on the southwest corner of what is now First Avenue South at Yesler Way, in the heart of today's Pioneer Square neighborhood. Although settlers were required to live on their claims for four years in order to receive title to them, many settlers whose claims were outside the growing village of Seattle maintained a second residence in town.

In 1852, John Harvey and E. A. Clark staked adjacent claims over the hill and across the valley on Clark's Prairie, the anthropogenic grassland of the Xacuabš (the People of the Large Lake), who are thought to have had a village of two longhouses—khwaac'ál'al, which housed tens of people near a sacred place on adjacent Brighton Beach. These places are in what is now the Brighton neighborhood. (See also History of Seattle before white settlement.) With his new location in town (and the village dispossessed), Clark became the county auditor and a justice of the peace in 1855.

A traveler, James McCormick, was murdered on Lake Union in July, 1853, but the murder was not discovered until the following spring of 1854. Two Indians were lynched for the murder, and Clark led an angry mob that hoped to hang a third young Indian accused (and later acquitted) of being involved in the murder; Sheriff Carson Boren prevented the lynching. The young Indian who escaped Clark's noose was later known as Cheshiahud or "Lake John".

Legal real property by settlers did not begin until at least a pretense of agreement with natives was made with the 1859 ratification of the 1855 Treaty of Point Elliott.

In the fall and winter of 1855–1856, hostilities broke out between Indians urging resistance and the White American settlers, primarily over discontent with the Point Elliott Treaty and other treaties enacted by Governor Isaac Stevens in 1854–1855. These hostilities climaxed in the "Battle of Seattle" in January 1856. Hostile Indians including Yakamas and Klickitats from east of the Cascade mountains assembled on Lake Washington, led by Yakama Chief Kamiakim and si'ab Lescay (Chief Leschi), to stage an attack on Seattle. Many friendly Indians took refuge in town, including Cheshiahud. The settlers retreated to a blockhouse on Elliott Bay at the end of Cherry Street. Although the battle lasted only one day and had only two known fatalities, nearly every building in King County outside the village of Seattle was burned, including the cabin and outbuildings of John Harvey and E. A. Clark, and the dam on the Black River that had raised Lake Washington—the White population was in the hundreds at this time.

== After the conquest ==
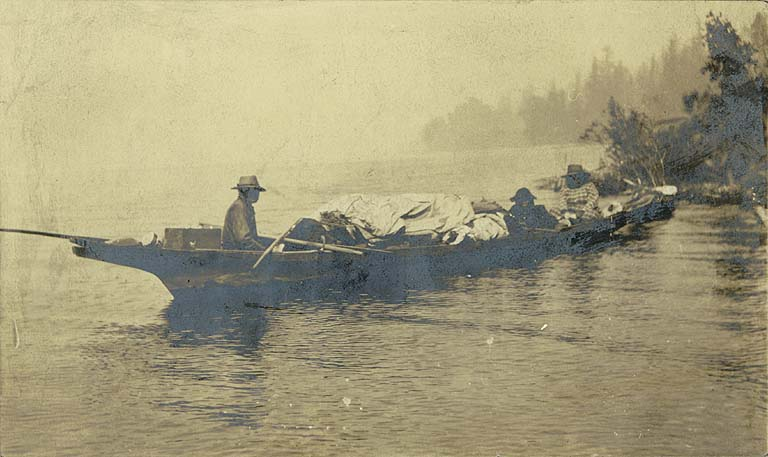
Lake John Cheshiahud and others in a canoe on Lake Union, c. 1885. A folded mast extends from the prow.

After the short war, Cheshiahud became a friend of David Denny and was sometimes known as Denny John. Cheshiahud married Sbeilsdot or Lucy Annie; as a widower, he married Tleboletsa or Madeline. He appears to have lived at sa'tsakaL (what is now Mercer Slough of Kelsey Creek, southwest Bellevue) in the 1870s, where they raised Jennie Davis (Janey Davis). The family later lived on the southwest lakeshore near or at SExt3i'tc1b (Bryn Mawr) until about 1880. He sold that property and bought land from David Denny, at the foot of Shelby Street on Portage Bay. Sbeilsdot died about 1885, but Cheshiahud lived for many years on Portage Bay with Tleboletsa. Their final years were spent in retirement at the Port Madison Reservation. In 1927, his daughter Jennie (Janey) provided a list of locations along Lake Washington that is a primary source of current knowledge about indigenous villages. Cheshiahud is buried at Evergreen Washelli Memorial Park beside his first wife, Lucy.

== Bibliography ==
- Boyd, Robert (1999). The Coming of the Spirit of Pestilence: Introduced Infectious Diseases and Population Decline Among Northwest Coast Indians, 1774-1874. Seattle and Vancouver: University of Washington Press and University of British Columbia Press. ISBN 978-0-295-97837-6.
- "Chudups John and others in a canoe on Lake Union, Seattle, ca. 1885". Seattle Historical Society Collection. University of Washington Digital Collections. c. 1885. Archived from the original (JPEG from silver gelatin print) on 2007-01-06.
  Negative Number: SHS 2228, Museum of History and Industry, Seattle .
- Denny, Orion O. (c. 1904). "Duwamish man and woman, Cheshiahud and Tieboletsa, also known as Old Tom and Madeline, Portage Bay, Seattle, Washington, ca. 1904" (JPEG from photograph). General Indian Collection no. 564. University of Washington Digital Collections.
  Negative Number: NA591
- Furtwangler, Albert (1997). Answering Chief Seattle. Seattle and London: University of Washington Press. ISBN 0-295-97633-0.
- "Lake John". Duwamish Tribe. Archived from the original on 2006-06-16.
- Lange, Greg; Tate, Cassandra (1998-11-04). "Legislature incorporates the Town of Seattle for the first time on January 14, 1865". HistoryLink.org Essay 168.
- Suttles, Wayne P.; Lane, Barbara (1990-08-20). "South Coast Salish". In Sturtevant, William C. (ed.). Handbook of North American Indians. Vol. 7. Northwest coast. Washington: Smithsonian Institution. p. 491. ISBN 0-16-020390-2. (v. 7).
- Talbert, Paul (2006-05-01). "SkEba'kst: The Lake People and Seward Park". The History of Seward Park. SewardPark.org. Archived from the original on 2005-12-14.
