= Me-Kwa-Mooks Park =

Park in Seattle, Washington, United States

- View of the park looking out toward Puget Sound
- Type: Public
- Coordinates: 47°33′49″N 122°24′20″W
- Area: 20.2-acre (82,000 m^{2})
- Established: 1971; 54 years ago
- Operated by: Seattle Parks and Recreation

Me-Kwa-Mooks Park is a 20.2-acre (82,000 m^{2}) public park located in the West Seattle neighborhood of Seattle, Washington, USA. Me-Kwa-Mooks is an Anglicized version of the Lushootseed word for Alki Point, sbaqʷabqs (pronounced SBAH-kwahb-ks), meaning "prairie point."

Today's Me-Kwa-Mooks Park is land that was acquired by the Parks Department in 1971. The site was originally the homestead of the pioneers Ferdinand and Emma Schmitz. When all the Schmitz family died it became city land.

In 1994, 4th and 5th graders from Pathfinder K-8 School helped make Me-Kwa-Mooks a park. In 2009, Pathfinder moved to Cooper Elementary School, a 10-year-old building on the other side of West Seattle, so they could no longer work on the park.

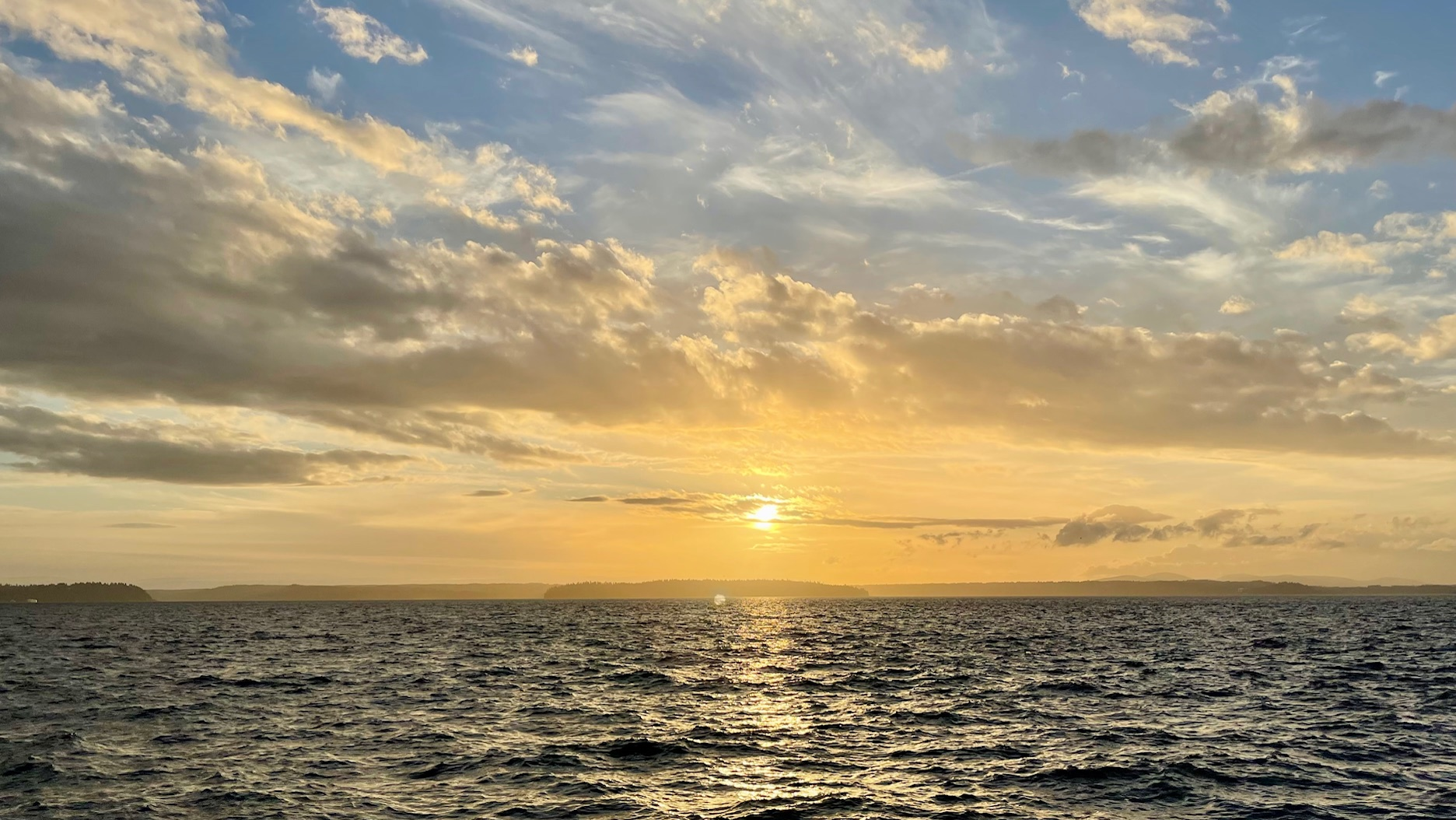
Me-Kwa-Mooks Park, facing west and looking across Puget Sound, late afternoon October 2023. Seattle, WA
