= History of Seattle before white settlement =

In the history of Seattle before white settlement, thirteen prominent villages existed in what is now the city of Seattle. The people living near Elliott Bay, and along the Duwamish, Black and Cedar Rivers were collectively known as the doo-AHBSH, or People of the Doo ("Inside"). Four prominent villages existed near what is now Elliott Bay and the (then-estuarial) lower Duwamish River. Before civil engineers rechanneled the Duwamish, the area had extensive tidelands, and had an abundance of seafoods.

The people living around Lake Washington were collectively known as hah-choo-AHBSH or hah-chu-AHBSH or Xacuabš, People of HAH-choo or Xachu, "People of a Large Lake" or "Lake People". When major European contact began, these people considered themselves related but distinct from the Dkh^{w}'Duw'Absh. The lake drained by the Black River in what is now Renton. The Black River joined the Cedar and White (now Green) rivers to become the Duwamish River and empty into what is now referred to as southeast Elliott Bay. As European contact continued and increased, the hah-choo-AHBSH (Xacuabš) and doo-AHBSH, (Dkh^{w}'Duw'Absh) became identified as the people represented by the Duwamish tribe. The people are Coast Salish, and (Skagit-Nisqually) Lushootseed by language.

Prairie or tall grassland areas (anthropogenic grasslands) grew in what is now Belltown, South Lake Union, Brooklyn in the University District (map ), along what is now Sand Point Way NE (map ), Brighton–Seward Park, Georgetown, and likely Alki, among others. The Liq'tid (LEEK-teed) or Licton Springs area was used as a spiritual health spa. Cranberries were harvested from the Slo'q 'qed (SLOQ-qed, bald head) a 85-acre (34-hectare) marsh and bog at what is now the North Seattle Community College garage, Interstate 5 interchange, and Northgate Mall of Northgate, the headwaters of the south fork of Thornton Creek. Open areas for game habitat were maintained by selective burning every few years, another application of anthropogenic grasslands.

== Downtown and lower Duwamish River ==
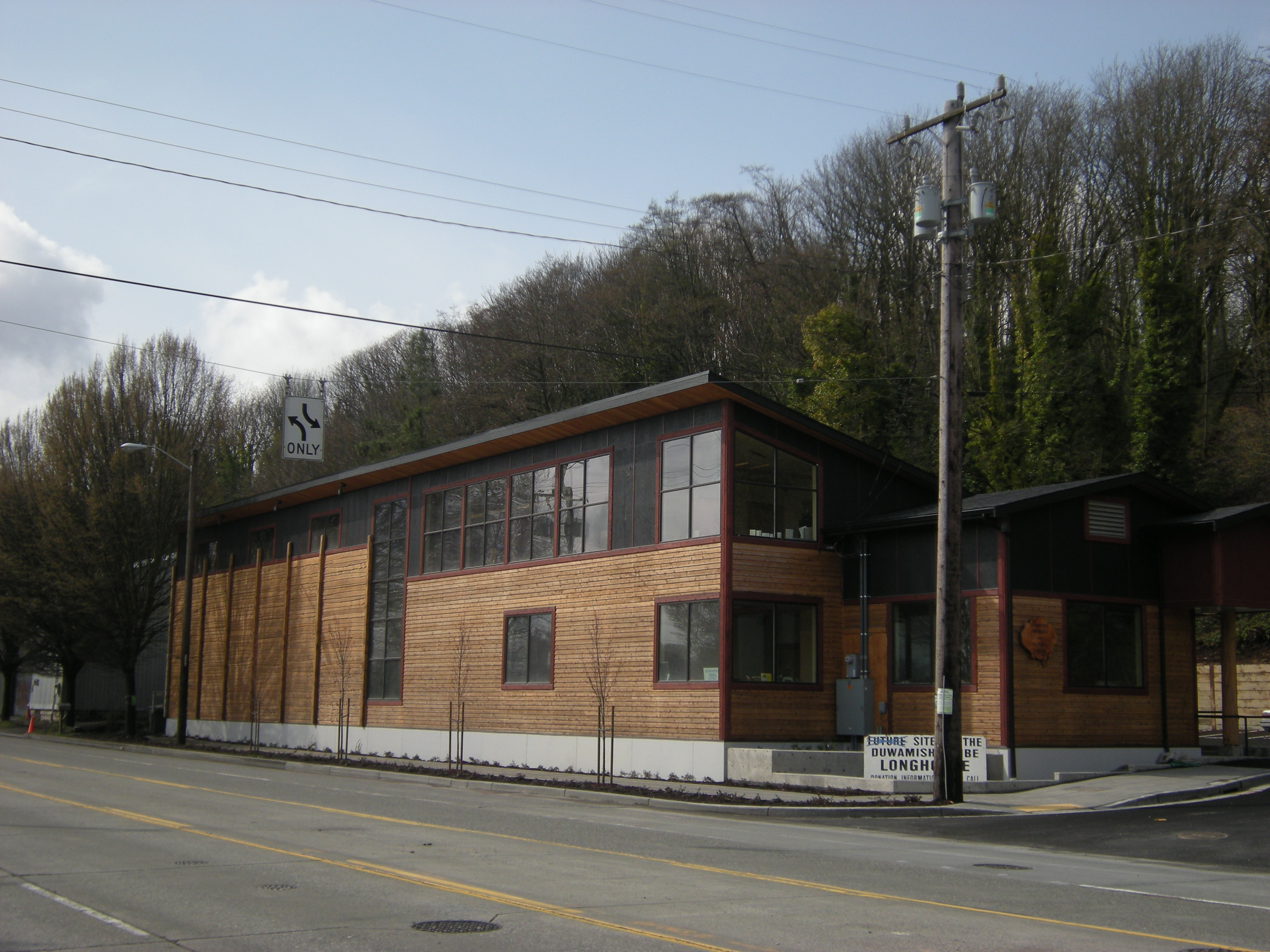
The present-day Duwamish Longhouse and Cultural Center, near the historic site of tohl-AHL-too ("herring house")

dzee-dzee-LAH-letch was the most important village on what is now called Elliott Bay, with some 200 people c. 1800. Chief Seattle [si'áb Si'ahl] lived here for some time. The village had eight large khwaac'ál'al (longhouses)—each 60 feet by 120 feet (18 m x 37 m)—plus a large potlatch house, where people from all over the area gathered. dzee-dzee-LAH-letch ("little crossing-over place") was located near the trail: appropriately, where the King Street Station was later built. Before the extensive tidelands were filled in, there was a spit here, separating Elliott Bay from a lagoon known for flounder.

tohl-AHL-too ("herring house") and later hah-AH-poos ("where there are horse clams") was on the west bank of the Duwamish River near its former estuarial mouth on Elliott Bay, located around what is now south Harbor Island. This was the original village site that had been inhabited since the 6th century (see also Duwamish tribe#History). It was abandoned sometime before 1800, but there elders reported that the village had seven (60 ft by 120 ft (37 m), 18 m x 37 m) longhouses plus a large (60 ft by 360 ft (110 m), 18 m x 110 m) potlatch house. At the successor village nearby there were three longhouses occupied by 75-100 people.

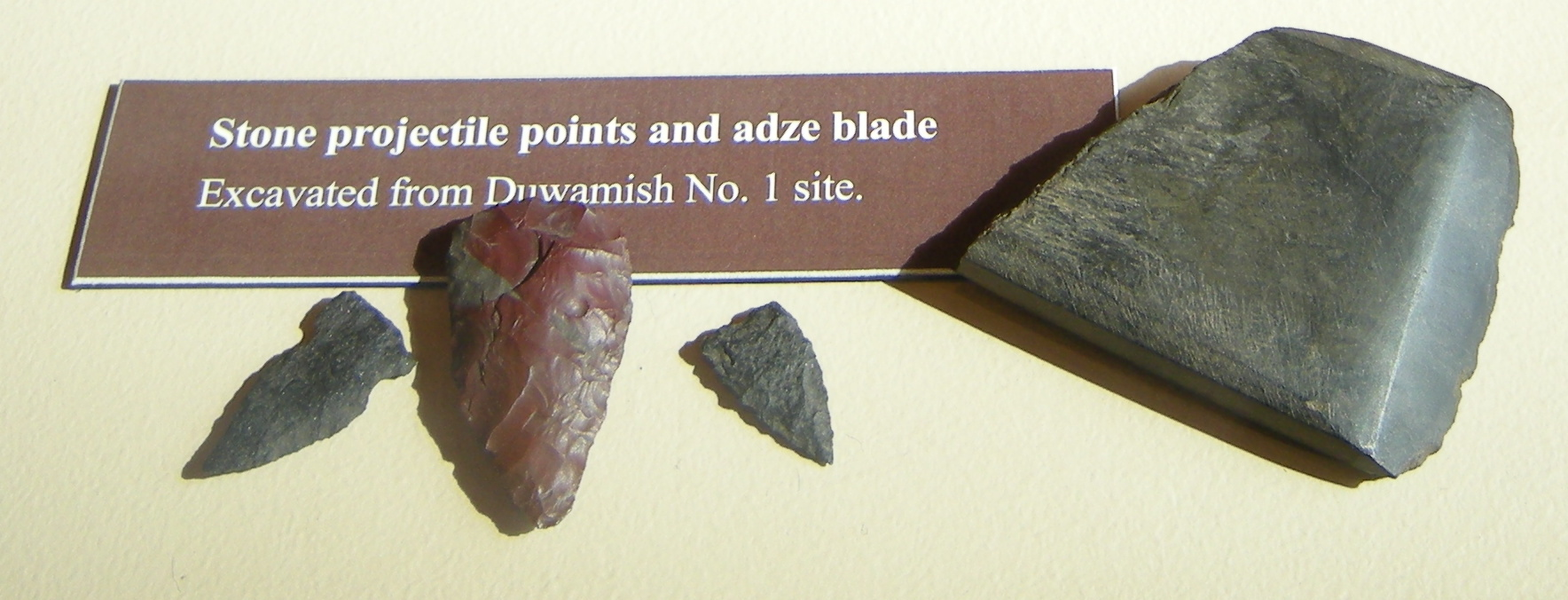
Three stone "projectile points" and a stone adze blade from Duwamish No. 1 site. Displayed at Duwamish Longhouse and Cultural Center

The Duwamish was a bountiful estuary, a powerful meandering river with extensive tidal flats and wildlife, when pioneer John Pike officially bought the land from the U.S. government in 1860, soon after the Treaty of Point Elliott, 1855. Local shipyards built fishing boats for European immigrants until the resource diminished. The site was being cleared of buildings to construct a marine terminal when archaeological discoveries in 1977 halted further development. This site is in what is now known as Herring House Park (Herring's House Park), just north of Terminal 107 (map ). The site overlooks Kellogg Island and a natural channel of the river. The 17-acre (69,000 m^{2}) park contains a natural intertidal basin at the shoreline and areas of marsh, meadow and forest in the upland portion. In season, the park has hundreds of juvenile fish, and migrating salmon which attract harbor seals, ospreys, and bald eagles and provide habitat for cormorants, great blue herons, purple martins and other native waterfowl. Overlooking the park is the Duwamish Longhouse, cultural center of the Duwamish Tribe (above). Above the contemporary Duwamish Longhouse is the restored and partially daylighted watershed of to-AH-wee (trout), now called Longfellow Creek, just over the ridge that is now called Delridge. Puget Creek was the freshwater resource and a seasonal fishery for the village. Much of Puget Park is now a natural area, along with others nearby. Eventually, with ongoing volunteer effort, the surroundings will have restored areas and views.

too-PAHLH-tehb was at the mouth of the easternmost estuary of the Duwamish River, approximately 1st Avenue at Spokane Street.

yee-LEH-khood ("basket cap" like those worn by the Yakama people) was a particularly long-established village on the then-west bank of a bend in the Duwamish River, in what is now Terminal 107 Park, the higher ground of the Port of Seattle terminal.

The kehl-kah-KWEH-yah ("Proud People") had their village at too-KWHEHL-teed ("a large open space") farther upstream at a former bend of the Duwamish, in what is now south Georgetown. The large open space was likely artificially maintained.

Salmon Bay Charlie and Chilohleet'sa's house at Shilshole with a canoe anchored offshore, c. 1905.

== North of Downtown ==
The people called shill-shohl-AHBSH had the village of shill-SHOHL ("threading a needle", apparently for the narrow opening out to Puget Sound) on the north shore of what is now named Salmon Bay, where the Ballard Locks were built. (See also SWAH-tsoo-gweel village, just below.)

== Along Lake Washington ==
All the people living around Lake Washington were collectively known as Xacuabš (hah-choo-AHBSH or hah-chu-AHBSH), People of HAH-choo or Xachu, "People of a Large Lake" or "Lake People". Initially, at the time of major European contact, these people considered themselves related but distinct from the Dkh^{w}'Duw'Absh. The lake drained out the Black River in present-day Renton. The Black River joined the Cedar and White (now Green) rivers to become the Duwamish River and empty into what is now called southeast Elliott Bay.

The hah-chu-AHBSH called what is known now as Bailey Peninsula in Seward Park skEba’kst (skuh-BAHKST, "nose"); the isthmus was cqa'lapsEb (TSKAH-lap-suhb, "neck"). As Lake Washington was then 9 feet (2.7 m) higher and the isthmus was only a few hundred feet wide, during seasonal floods the peninsula would become an island. A large wetland and marsh was north of what is now the park entrance circle, at what is now Andrews Bay. The lake, bay, wetlands, and peninsula were richly abundant.

The Xacuabš had a village of two longhouses (khwaac'ál'al, forerunners of sizable cohousing for tens of people in each one) at xaxao'Ltc (ha-HAO-hlch, the "sacred or taboo place", from xá?xa?), at or near what is now Brighton Beach. Villages were diffuse. Other khwaac'ál'al were on the southwest lake shore at SExti'tcb ("by means of swimming", Bryn Mawr), at TL’Ltcus (TLEELH-chus, "little island", Pritchard's Island), and to farther north at Leschi Park.

Besides providing food, the lake was home to powerful spirits. The word xá?xa? also means sacred, great and mighty. The previously mentioned xaxao'lc ("taboo place") at Brighton Beach, south of the peninsula, was named for a supernatural spirit who was said to live in the lake there. The unusual sound of the babbling waters at this place indicated its presence. Near Colman Park lived an ?ya’hos, a horned spirit that was associated with landslides and earthquakes. Remarkably, this is the approximate location of the Seattle Fault, which moved more than 20 feet (6.1 m) vertically during an earthquake about 1,100 years ago. This quake caused a landslide at South Point on Mercer Island sending a large section of forest into the lake. Little earth beings were said to inhabit the tree stumps there and drove insane a man while he was trying to harvest the bark from the stumps.

Two villages whose names are unknown were located to the east of Downtown on Lake Washington. One of the possible village sites of the skah-TEHLB-shahbsh was around what was later named Wetmore Slough, now the filled Genesee Park in Columbia City. A second village of the skah-TEHLB-shahbsh was at what is now Leschi Park.

What is now Rainier Beach (Atlantic City Park) is the possible site of one of two skah-TEHLB-shahbsh villages, though the village name is not known.

The influential and principal village of the hloo-weelh-AHBSH was in the vicinity of present-day Brooklyn Avenue, at a then-much larger Portage Bay, and SWAH-tsoo-gweel ("portage") on the north shores of a Union Bay nearly a mile farther than today, near what is now the Burke-Gilman Trail and the southeast corner of Ravenna Park. (What is now the Burke-Gilman Trail was built along the shoreline c. 1886 by the Seattle, Lake Shore and Eastern Railway.) Five longhouses were located on the north of the bay. Other longhouses were near the present University of Washington (UW) steam plant (west of the UW IMA Building, and between what is now the Center for Urban Horticulture and present-day Children's Hospital). For this village, their backyard was the neighborhoods of the Ravenna Creek watershed today. In summer, the village largely moved to Sahlouwil, what is now southeast Laurelhurst on Lake Washington.

The village of hehs-KWEE-kweel ("skate") was of the hloo-weelh-AHBSH (from s'hloo-WEELH, "a tiny hole drilled to measure the thickness of a canoe"), for the narrow passage through then-large and resource-rich Union Bay marsh. Traces of the marsh survive as the Union Bay Natural Area and the Foster Island area of north Washington Park Arboretum. The trees and the island of Stitici, (Stee-tee-tchee) were their ceremonial burial ground. Stitici, Little Island, is now called Foster Island. The village was at the northeast tip of what is now Madison Park. One longhouse may have been used as a potlatch house. The Duwamish Tribe is today leveraging the sacred site in the path of substantial enlargement of SR 520 through south Union Bay between Redmond and Interstate 5, in their quest for recognition.

TLEHLS ("minnows" or "shiners") was on the shores of what is now called Wolf Bay in Windermere, on Lake Washington south of SqWsEb, now called Magnuson Park. BEbqwa'bEks (small prairie—anthropogenic grassland) was near what is now Windermere. One or three longhouses have been documented. These people may have been associated with the hloo-weelh-AHBSH of Union Bay.

The village of too-HOO-beed was of the too-oh-beh-DAHBSH extended family and was near what is now called Thornton Creek in what is now Matthews Beach, with Meadowbrook their back yard.

== Bibliography ==
- Anderson, Ross; Green, Sara Jean (27 May 2001). "A culture slips away". The Seattle Times. Seattle History : 150 Years: Seattle By and By. p. 1. Archived from the original on 7 May 2006.
  and Ibid (27 May 2001). "The settlers saw trees, endless trees. The natives saw the spaces between the trees". The Seattle Times. Seattle History : 150 Years: Seattle By and By. p. 2. Archived from the original on 18 May 2006.
- Bates, Dawn; Hess, Thom; Hilbert, Vi; map by Dassow, Laura (1994). Bates Dawn (ed.). Lushootseed dictionary. Seattle and London: University of Washington Press. ISBN 0-295-97323-4.
  Completely reformatted, greatly revised and expanded update of Hess, Thom, Dictionary of Puget Salish (University of Washington Press, 1976).
- Dailey, Tom (14 June 2006). "Duwamish-Seattle". Coast Salish Villages of Puget Sound.
  Page links to Village Descriptions Duwamish-Seattle section .
  Dailey referenced "Puget Sound Geography" by T. T. Waterman. Washington DC: National Anthropological Archives, mss. [n.d.] [ref. 2];
  Duwamish et al. vs. United States of America, F-275. Washington DC: US Court of Claims, 1927. [ref. 5];
  "Indian Lake Washington" by David Buerge in the Seattle Weekly, 1–7 August 1984 [ref. 8];
  "Seattle Before Seattle" by David Buerge in the Seattle Weekly, 17–23 December 1980. [ref. 9];
  The Puyallup-Nisqually by Marian W. Smith. New York: Columbia University Press, 1940. [ref. 10].
  Recommended start is "Coast Salish Villages of Puget Sound" .
- "Delridge Open Space Acquisitions". PRO PARKS PROJECT INFORMATION. Seattle Parks and Recreation. 8 November 2005. Archived from the original on 21 September 2006.
- "History - Pre-Euro American Settlement". Warren G. Magnuson Park. Seattle Parks and Recreation. 22 November 2005. Archived from the original on 29 September 2007.
- "Southern Coast Salish Territories". "Maps", "American Indians of the Pacific Northwest Collection", "Libraries Home > Subject > History > Tm > Pacific Northwest History". University of Washington Libraries, Digital Collections. Archived from the original on 18 June 2006.
- Speer, Thomas R. (2004). "Duwamish history and culture". from "Dkhw'Duw'Absh, 'People of the Inside'". Duwamish Tribe. Archived from the original on 3 April 2006.
- Switzer, Jeff (20 February 2005). "Duwamish Tribe seeks protection for Foster Island". King County Journal.
- Sykes, Karen (13 January 2005). "Hike of the Week: Urban trail is a tribute to man and nature". Take a hike. The Seattle Post-Intelligencer.
- Talbert, Paul (1 May 2006). "SkEba'kst: The Lake People and Seward Park". The History of Seward Park. SewardPark.org. Archived from the original on 14 December 2005.
- "University District". Seattle City Clerk's Neighborhood Map Atlas. Office of the Seattle City Clerk. June 2002.
