= Duwamish people =

Coast Salish people in Washington State

Duwamish
dxʷdəwʔabš
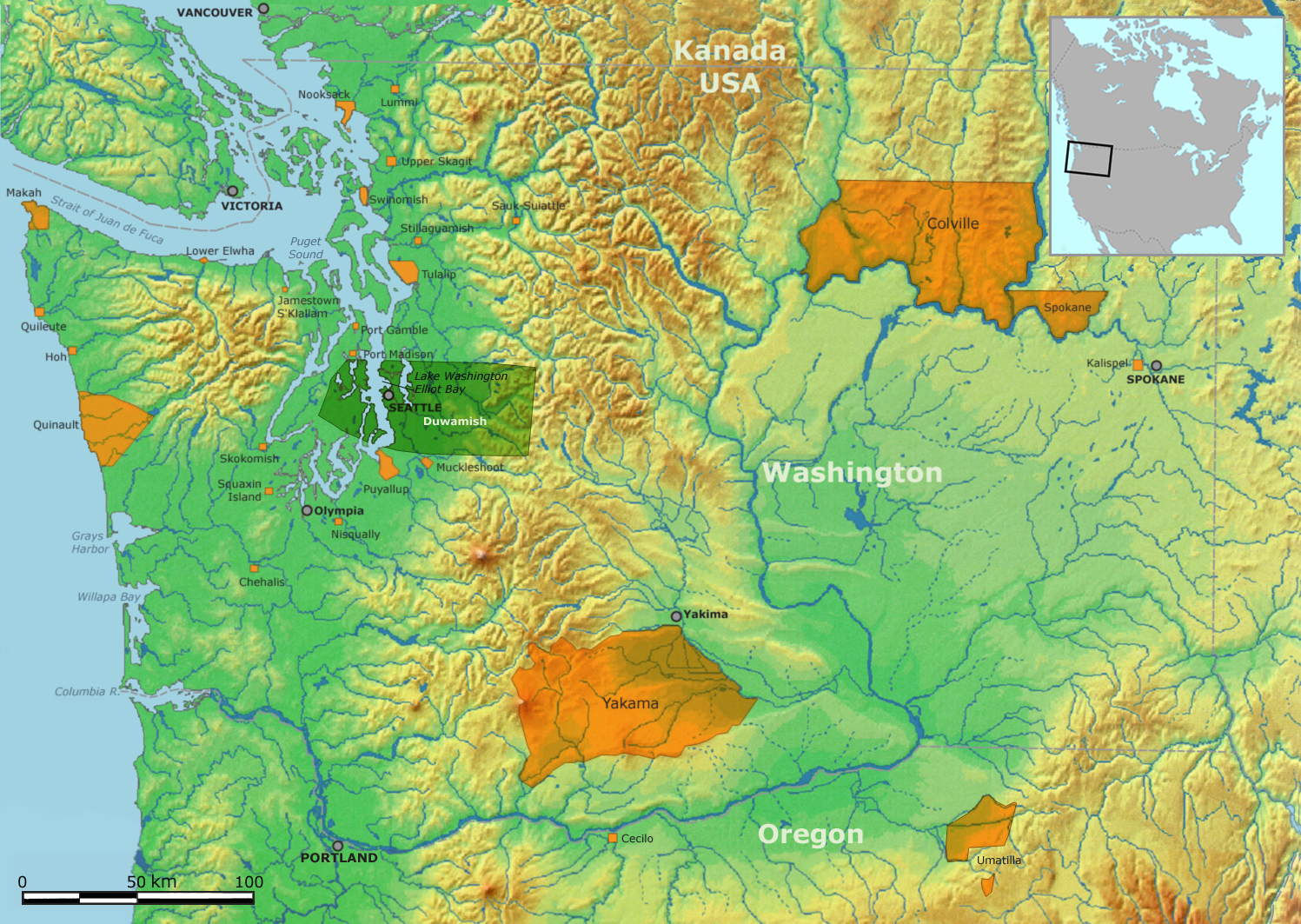
- Duwamish territory shown highlighted in green. Orange blocks are current Indian reservations

Total population
- About 351 (1854), unknown but more than 600 (2023); 159 by ancestry alone (2020)

Regions with significant populations
- Western Washington, United States

Languages
- English, formerly Lushootseed (Southern)

Religion
- Indigenous folk religion, Christianity, including syncretic forms

Related ethnic groups
- Other Lushootseed-speaking peoples

The Duwamish (Lushootseed: dxʷdəwʔabš, [dxʷdəwʔɑbʃ]) are a Lushootseed-speaking Southern Coast Salish people in western Washington, and the Indigenous people of metropolitan Seattle.

Prior to colonization, the center of Duwamish society was around the Black and Duwamish rivers in Washington. The modern Duwamish primarily descend from two separate groups: the dxʷdəwʔabš, or Duwamish, and the x̌ačuʔabš, a group of peoples whose traditional territory extends around Lake Washington. Although the primary language used by the Duwamish today is English, the Duwamish historically spoke a subdialect of the southern dialect of Lushootseed, a Coast Salish language spoken throughout much of western Washington.

For centuries, the Duwamish have lived in at least 17 villages around the Seattle area. In 1855, the Duwamish were among the signatories of the 1855 Treaty of Point Elliott, in which they ceded their land to the United States government and in return would remove to reservation lands established by the treaty. Two reservations were created for the Duwamish: the Muckleshoot and Suquamish reservations. However, no reservation was ever created directly in the Duwamish homeland. Since then, although many Duwamish did move to the reservations, many others did not, preferring to remain in their homelands, creating a schism between Duwamish descendants. Today, the Duwamish, including the modern tribes descended from the aboriginal Duwamish such as the Suquamish Nation, the Muckleshoot Indian Tribe, and the unrecognized Duwamish Tribe, have been a large part of the modern history of the Seattle area, continuing to advocate for their treaty rights and the preservation and revitalization of their culture, language, and land.

Duwamish people today are enrolled in several different tribes. These include the unrecognized Duwamish Tribe and the federally recognized tribes:

- Lummi Tribe of the Lummi Reservation
- Muckleshoot Indian Tribe
- Suquamish Indian Tribe of the Port Madison Reservation
- Swinomish Indian Tribal Community
- Tulalip Tribes of Washington

== Name and etymology ==
The name Duwamish is an anglicization of the Lushootseed name dxʷdəwʔabš. The name dxʷdəwʔabš means "people inside the bay." The name refers to the Cedar River, which is called dxʷdəw in Lushootseed, and means "inside the bay." The name references the way the Duwamish villages were located inland, rather than along Puget Sound.

The name is composed of the prefix dxʷ-, meaning "toward, to," the suffix =abš, meaning "people," and the root word √dəw, a variant form of dəkʷ, meaning "inside something relatively small." dxʷdəwʔabš has also been spelled variantly as dxʷduʔabš.

== Classification ==
The Duwamish are a Southern Coast Salish people. The Southern Coast Salish are a group of related peoples who share similar culture, history, and customs. Included in this classification are the many Lushootseed-speaking peoples and the Twana (who speak the Twana language). The broader Coast Salish are a group of related peoples who have elements of shared history and culture and speak related languages.

Prior to colonization, "Duwamish" (dxʷdəwʔabš) originally referred to just those from Elliott Bay and the Duwamish, Black, and Cedar Rivers. However, beginning around 1855, the word "Duwamish" was used to also include the Green and White river peoples and the x̌ačuʔabš. The x̌ačuʔabš were composed of several related peoples whose villages were located along Lake Washington and the Sammamish River; the x̌aʔx̌ačuʔabš, whose villages were located around Lake Union, and the Shilshole (šilšulabš), whose village was located on Salmon Bay. At the time of initial major European contact, these peoples considered themselves wholly distinct from the Duwamish.

== Territory ==
The center of Duwamish territory was historically the area at the confluence of the Black and Cedar Rivers, called the Lake Fork.

== History ==
=== Prehistory and early contact period ===
Western Washington has been permanently inhabited for at least 12,000 years, to the Pleistocene epoch and the end of the Last Glacial Maximum. Although it is possible that humans lived in the region before that time, the landscape was highly volcanic and unstable, leading to vast alteration of the coastline and rivers over time. Archaeological sites at the former village at West Point (Lushootseed: paq̓ac̓aɬčuʔ) date back at least 4,200 years. Villages at the mouth of the Duwamish River such as həʔapus and t̕uʔəlalʔtxʷ had been continuously inhabited since the 6th century CE.

In the first half of the 19th century, the Duwamish began facing extreme raiding from the Lekwiltok and Kwakwaka'wakw, who raided much of the Puget Sound area for slaves and loot. Food resources varied, and resources were not always sufficient to last through to spring. There is evidence that an extensive trade and potlatch network evolved to help distribute resources to areas in need that varied year to year, and was potent and effective until European diseases arriving in the 1770s and ravaged the region for more than a century.

By 1851, the Duwamish had 17 villages with at least 93 buildings, including longhouses, around the present-day Seattle area. There were four prominent villages on Elliott Bay and the lower Duwamish River. Before modern civil engineering, the area at the mouth of Elliot Bay had extensive tidelands which were abundantly rich in marine life and a plentiful source of food for the Duwamish.

Duwamish contact with Europeans was sporadic until the 1850s. From the early 19th century, the maritime fur trade in the Puget Sound–Strait of Georgia regions greatly accelerated the pace of social and organizational change. American settlements at Alki Point (sbaqʷabqs) and what is now Pioneer Square in Downtown Seattle were established in 1851 and 1852. From this point on, Americans settled the region at ever-increasing rates, eventually leading to the Treaty of Point Elliot in 1855.

In 1854, American ethnologist George Gibbs conducted a survey of the Indigenous peoples of Puget Sound. In this survey, he recorded 162 Duwamish people living at Lake Fork and along the Duwamish River, and 189 Duwamish and their relatives living on Lake Washington and along the Green and White rivers, for an estimated total of 351.

=== Treaty of Point Elliott and the Puget Sound War ===
The Duwamish attended and took part in the signing of the Treaty of Point Elliot on January 22, 1855, at bək̓ʷəɬtiwʔ (Point Elliott, now Mukilteo, Washington). The treaty was drawn up hastily and negotiations were conducted only in English and Chinook Jargon, a trade language which was not spoken by many attending and later deemed not suitable for diplomatic processes. This poor diplomacy created several misunderstandings and disputes between the parties that persist into the modern day. The treaty was signed by then-territorial governor Isaac Stevens and representatives from the Duwamish (led by Chief Seattle) and 14 other treaty tribes. It would not be ratified until 1859, four years after the negotiations. During that time, the unsigned treaty was used as justification for many illegal encroachments on Duwamish territory.

Duwamish signatories of the Treaty of Point Elliot

- Seattle
- Ts'huahntl
- Nowachais
- Hasehdooan (a.k.a. Keokuck)

Due to the American government's policy of consolidating many smaller peoples into large treaty tribes and Stevens' personal political motivations, prominent leaders were designated as chiefs for the purposes of the treaties. Signatories were appointed more or less at the behest of the Americans, bypassing what they saw as the maddening fluidity of tribal leadership. Four people represented the Duwamish on the treaty: Seattle, Ts'huahntl, Nowachais, and Hasehdooan. Seattle signed the treaty under for the Duwamish, Suquamish, and twenty-one other tribes designated as "allied tribes" under the Duwamish, creating the notion that he was the leader of a large confederation of tribes. This did not reflect the reality of Duwamish political organization at the time. Hasehdooan/Keokuck was one of the leaders of the Black River settlements, and his signature was likely intended to serve as a signature for all the people in the core area of the Duwamish. Seattle's signature was intended to serve for all Suquamish and Duwamish as well.

The Duwamish signed away the title to more than 54,000 acres, which today includes the cities of Seattle, Renton, Tukwila, Bellevue, and Mercer Island. Among other things, the treaty guaranteed both hunting and fishing rights, and reservations for all signatory tribes. As part of that guarantee, the Port Madison, Snohomish, Swinomish, and Lummi reservations were established as temporary reservations, and it was promised by the American side that other reservations would soon be expanded and new reservations established for other tribes. It was originally planned by the treaty commission that all tribes west of the Cascades would eventually locate to the Tulalip Reservation, including the Duwamish, and some Duwamish did indeed move to the Tulalip Reservation at the time. The then-believed temporary Port Madison reservation was established for use primarily by the Duwamish, Suquamish, and several other tribes. While many Duwamish later moved to the Port Madison reservation, including Seattle, many did not, and either never left or returned to their homelands along the Duwamish watershed to await a reservation of their own. This was due to several reasons. The Port Madison Reservation was not large enough to sustain the 1000+ individuals estimated to be assigned there, the reservation was too far from their usual and accustomed areas, and the mainland Duwamish were not on friendly terms with the Suquamish of the Port Madison area at the time.

Later that year, due to dissatisfaction with the established reservations, lack of follow-through on promises, abuse of power, and murder of Indigenous people at the hands of settlers, the Puget Sound War began. The Stkelmish (Note: The Stkelmish were one of the x̌ačuʔabš groups. Their village was located near what is now Bellevue.) village of saʔcaqaɬ, south of modern-day Bellevue, was used as a staging ground in the 1856 Battle of Seattle. The Duwamish took part in the battle on both sides, with many of the Hachuamish fighting against the Americans, and Chief Seattle aiding the settlers in the siege.

In August 1856, the Fox Island Council was held to address the grievances held by people after the treaty. There, Isaac Stevens agreed to establish a reservation, the Muckleshoot reservation, for the Duwamish and other tribes living along the Duwamish watershed, including the White and Green rivers, in hopes that the remaining Duwamish would move to the reservation. The reservation was understood by the Indigenous people at the meeting to consist of a wedge of land between the White and Green rivers, however the official documents only include the area of today's reservation. It was created in 1857 by executive order.

=== Reservation era (late 19th century) ===
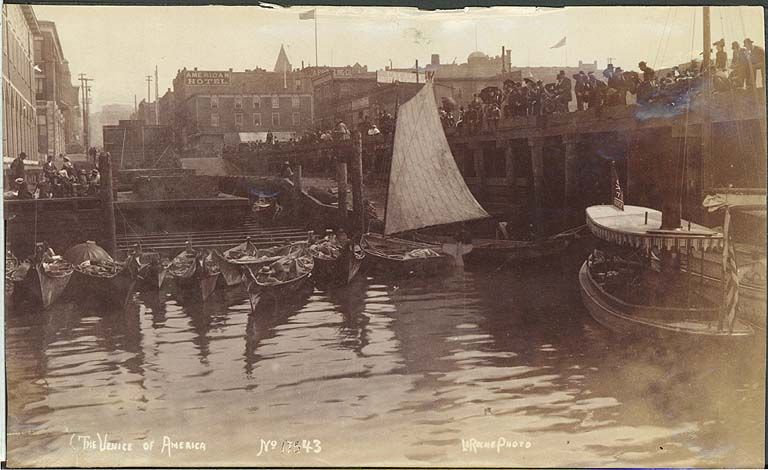
Seattle waterfront with moored Indian canoes (c. 1892)

In the years following, most of the remaining Duwamish moved from their historical homelands along Lake Washington and along the Duwamish and Cedar Rivers to the Suquamish Reservation, with others moving to the Muckleshoot and Tulalip reservations, although some still stayed behind, refusing to move. Some of those who remained assimilated into white society. This period led to the modern split between the Duwamish descendants: the Muckleshoot, Suquamish, and eponymous Duwamish tribes. The remaining Duwamish were expelled from the town of Seattle following the passage of Town of Seattle Ordinance No. 5.

Efforts were made to increase the size of the already existing reservations or create another reservation for the Duwamish to accommodate the influx of people. G. A. Paige, the Indian Agent in charge of the Port Madison reservation, wrote in 1857 that a reservation should be established at the Lake Fork, as requested by the Duwamish. Around that time, around 150 Duwamish had requested to speak to Isaac Stevens about the creation of a reservation, and he promised to them that "if he were properly informed about their situation" he would create a reservation for them. In 1864, the Port Madison reservation was enlarged by executive order at the request of Seattle and a delegation of other natives. Proposals were made by the US Superintendent of Indian Affairs in 1866 to create another reservation in the Duwamish homeland near what is now Renton and Tukwila, but American settlers wrote to Arthur Denny, the territorial delegate to congress, complaining about the proposal. Denny himself signed the complaint petition, as well as David Denny, Henry Yesler, David "Doc" Maynard, and virtually all of Seattle's establishment, saying that "such a reservation would do a great injustice" and be "of little value to the Indians." The petition was forwarded to the BIA and subsequently, the proposal was blocked later that year. In 1868 President Andrew Johnson was recommended to sign an executive order to designate all land between the Green and White rivers as part of the Muckleshoot reservation. However, the order was either misplaced or set aside, and no action was taken. The Muckleshoot reservation was eventually expanded by executive order in 1874, in order to provide a home for the other Duwamish living on the lower Duwamish drainage system.

After the 1860s, the Duwamish who remained off-reservation continued to live in their traditional communities along Lake Washington and the Black, Cedar, White, and Green rivers. Traditional longhouses were built at these sites into the mid-1800s. One such settlement was located at the confluence of the Black and Cedar rivers. The settlement was led by William (also known as Stoda), the most powerful political leader of the Duwamish from the mid-1800s until his death. William led the Duwamish both at the confluence and on the reservations, keeping their political integrity intact. William brought Duwamish from the still-existing Duwamish villages, as well as those living on the Port Madison and Muckleshoot reservations, to a sing gamble ceremony in 1894. After his death in 1896, the off-reservation Duwamish community began to move to new white settlements. By 1910, all known independent Duwamish settlements had disappeared. This was greatly effected by Ordinance No. 5, which in 1865 banned Native Americans from living in the city unless housed and employed by a white settler, and also by the repeated burning of still-existing Duwamish settlements.

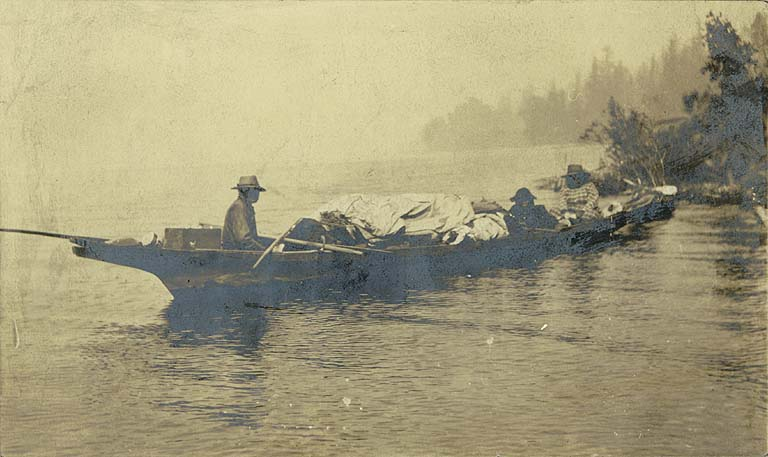
Cheshiahud and others in a canoe on Lake Union (c. 1885)

By this time, all Duwamish were either living on reservations or as part of white settlements. However, William Rogers (the nephew of William/Stoda) and Charles Satiacum continued the sociopolitical relationships between individual Duwamish both on and off the reservation. In 1915, in cooperation with the Northwest Federation of American Indians, they produced a list of 361 Duwamish people, on and off-reservation, who were part of the "Duwamish Tribe of Indians" led by them, chief and sub-chief, respectively.

In 1925, another group of Duwamish descendants organized as the Duwamish Tribal Organization. While the earlier 1915 organization was primarily composed of people who had lived in or descended from the Duwamish communities in the area, the Duwamish Tribal Organization's initial membership was primarily (71%) composed of people descended from early mixed-race marriages in the 1850s, but otherwise had little to no contact with extant Duwamish communities at the time.

In the early 1900s, many Duwamish had converted to the Indian Shaker Church, a local religion of mixed Christian and Indigenous beliefs. Since then, the primary religion of the Duwamish has been Christianity, albeit of several different denominations.

=== Modern history ===
Much of the 20th- and 21st-century history of the Duwamish has been marked by a struggle for defending treaty rights and claims. In 1962, the Duwamish were awarded $62,000 for their land claims. In 1974, United States v. Washington (commonly known as the Boldt Decision), ruled that federally-recognized tribes in the state of Washington have rights to 50% of the fishing harvest, as guaranteed by the treaties. The ruling was appealed and upheld in 1979. Duwamish descendants enrolled in the federally recognized tribes had fishing rights; however, the Duwamish Tribe, as they are unrecognized, were not included in the Boldt Decision.

The Duwamish Tribe themselves have also been working towards federal recognition. In 1977, they filed a petition for federal recognition.

The Duwamish continue to be involved in Seattle's urban Indian culture and are represented in institutions such as United Indians of All Tribes and the Seattle Indian Health Board.

Federally-recognized tribes such as the Muckleshoot and Suquamish as well as the Duwamish Tribe have worked closely with the city of Seattle to promote and develop and preserve local Native culture and history, both for the Duwamish, and non-Duwamish urban Indians. As of late 2022, Indigenous businesses have begun to open in Seattle, including ʔálʔal Cafe, (Note: From the Lushootseed "ʔalʔal," meaning "house") which uses local ingredients and shares traditional Native American dishes from around North America.

The Duwamish also work with nearby cities to preserve and protect their history. The Duwamish Hill Preserve in Tukwila is a culturally significant space in traditional stories and served as a historical vantage point. In addition, the Renton History Museum in Renton, Washington, has a small exhibit on the archaeological and cultural history of the Duwamish.

== Traditional culture and society ==
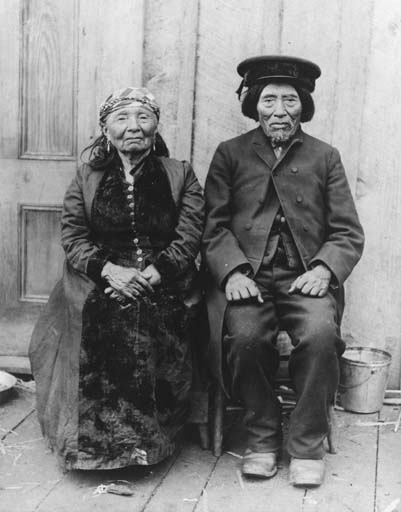
Duwamish man and woman, Old Tom and Madeline, Portage Bay, Seattle, c. 1904. "Old Tom" is likely Cheshiahud

=== The village ===
Like many other Coast Salish societies, traditional Duwamish society was dominated by the village. It was the basis of societal organization for the Puget Sound peoples and, in the pre-contact period, the village was the highest form of social organization. Each village had one or more cedar plank longhouses housing one or more extended families. Longhouses were often divided into sections by dividers made of cattail or cedar, with each family having their own section of the house with a fire pit in the center of the section. A single longhouse could support as few as tens of people, to as many as hundreds of people.

The Duwamish, a primarily riverine people, built most of their villages along the dxʷdəw, today the Duwamish, Black, and Cedar Rivers. The x̌ačuʔabš, on the other hand, were primarily lake-oriented peoples and their villages were mostly located along Lake Washington and Lake Union.

Although the village was the highest form of social cohesion, it was not centralized. There were no formal organs of government or authority which ruled over a village. Although members of the Duwamish have been historically called "chiefs," the Duwamish (along with other Puget Sound peoples) did not have chiefs. Rather, that term was bestowed upon important individuals of local villages by members of the United States government and the general public. In reality, authority was entrusted to high-status individuals when called for, such as leading a war party, constructing a house, or gathering berries. The highest-status male of the highest-status family in a village was generally seen as the leader of the village for most purposes, and this position fluctuated often.

Longhouse architecture continues to be used to this day in cultural settings. An example is the north face of the Burke Museum at the University of Washington. More recently, on January 3, 2009, the Duwamish Tribe opened the Duwamish Longhouse and Cultural Center. The Center's design of the main hall of the Duwamish Longhouse and Cultural Center closely echoes a traditional longhouse.

=== Social organization ===
For most of their history, the Duwamish were not a unified tribe. Instead, villages were completely autonomous, linked by shared language, culture, location, and family. While some villages held higher status and had a certain influence over others, there was no official authority of one village over another.

Duwamish villages, due to their geographical and familial closeness, were historically tightly allied within their drainage. Duwamish villages also were closely allied with their neighbors, such as the Hachuamish, the Sammamish, the Snoqualmie, the Stkamish, the Puyallup, the Homamish, Suquamish, and many more. As marrying distant peoples to get unique access to far-away resources was ideal, some Duwamish intermarried and allied with peoples as far away as the Stillaguamish. Good marriages gave prestige and could result in the gain of material wealth.

Intermarriage between villages created a large trade network stretching across much of the Pacific Northwest, extending up into what is now British Columbia and over the Cascade Range. The Puget Sound was the primary waterway connecting the Lushootseed-speaking peoples with the rest of the world, allowing swift water travel across great distances.

Duwamish society was divided into an upper class, lower class, and slave class. Each of these classes were largely hereditary, although social movement did happen. Nobility was based on impeccable genealogy, inter-tribal kinship, wise use of resources, and possession of esoteric knowledge about the workings of spirits and the spirit world, making an effective marriage of class, secular, religious, and economic power. There were physical distinctions for high-status individuals: mothers carefully shaped the heads of their young babies, binding them with cradle boards just long enough to produce a steep sloping forehead.

== Successor tribes ==
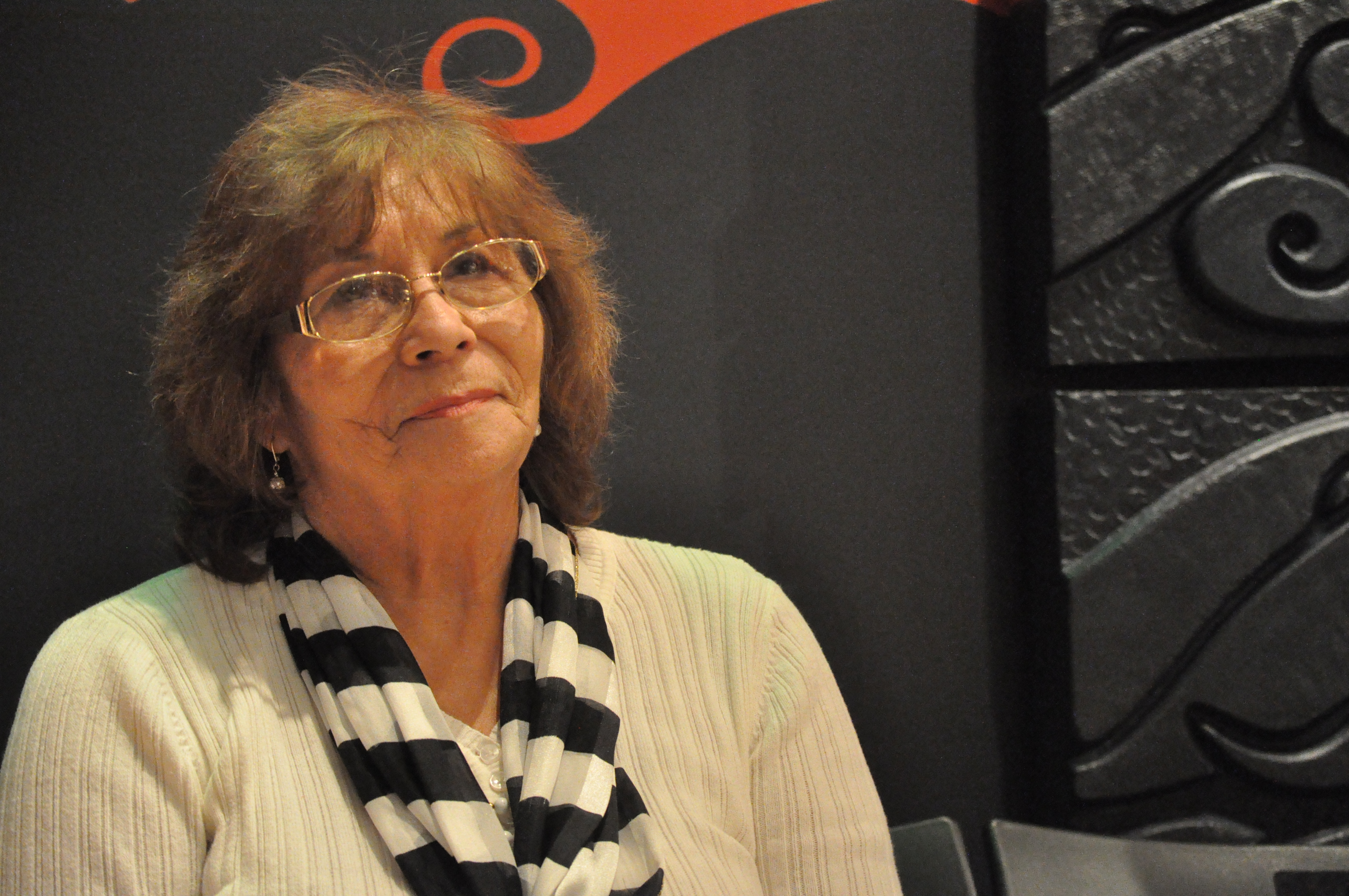
Cecile Hansen, chairwoman of the Duwamish Tribe, 2011

Today, Duwamish people are primarily enrolled in the federally recognized tribes, the Lummi Tribe of the Lummi Reservation, Muckleshoot Indian Tribe, Suquamish Indian Tribe of the Port Madison Reservation, Swinomish Indian Tribal Community, and Tulalip Tribes of Washington, and the unrecognized Duwamish Tribe. They are all located in western Washington. The Muckleshoot Tribe and the Suquamish Nation are the federally recognized successors-in-interest to the aboriginal Duwamish, and the Duwamish Tribe is seeking recognition as one of the successors to the aboriginal Duwamish as well.

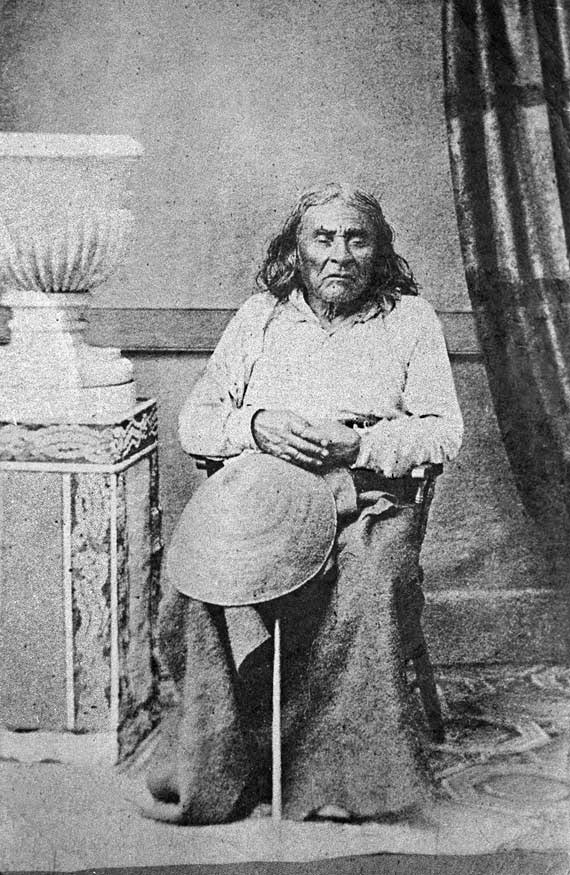
Chief Seattle, 1864

=== Duwamish Tribe ===
The Duwamish Tribe is an unrecognized tribe based in Seattle, Washington which has been seeking federal recognition as the Duwamish Indian Tribe.

In 1925, the Duwamish Tribal Organization (commonly known as the Duwamish Tribe) was formed, where they drafted a constitution, wrote bylaws, and implemented structure for the organization. To this day, they are not recognized as a tribe by the U.S. federal government or the state of Washington. Until 1974, the Duwamish Tribe mostly pursued land claims agreements in court, entitled to treaty tribes by Congress. They first and unsuccessfully attempted to pursue claims against the Court of Claims and in Congress in 1934, however, in 1962, they were successful in submitting a claim to the Indian Claims Commission.

They have sought and been denied federal recognition by the Bureau of Indian Affairs in 1996, 2015, and 2019. In 2001, they were briefly granted recognition by an executive order from President Bill Clinton as he left office. However, it was reversed less than two days later as the incoming President George W. Bush cancelled the many executive orders Clinton signed in his final days citing "procedural errors." Most recently, in May 2022, they once again sued the Department of the Interior for recognition.

In 2022, the Duwamish Tribe sued for federal recognition in The Duwamish Tribe et al. v. Haaland et al., heard in Washington Western District Court. Representatives of the Muckleshoot, Suquamish, Tulalip and Puyallup tribes have voiced their opposition to federal recognition for the Duwamish Tribe, pointing out that many Duwamish people are enrolled in their tribes. On January 1, 2025, the District Court ordered the Department of Interior to reconsider the Tribe's petition for federal recognition under the regulations adopted in 2015, canceling the previous denial.

The Duwamish tribe owns and operates several services and organizations. In 1979, the Duwamish Tribe established the Duwamish Tribal Services, a 501(c) nonprofit organization which provides social services to the organization's members. In addition, the Duwamish Tribe constructed the Chief Si?ahl Duwamish Longhouse and Cultural Center on purchased land along Marginal Way, across from Terminal 107 Park. It is built near the site of the former village həʔapus.

In 1991, the Duwamish Tribe had about 400 members, and in 2019, they had about 600 members. Since 1975, the tribe has been led by Chairwoman Cecile Hansen, an enrolled member of the Suquamish Tribe and the great-great-grandniece of Chief Seattle.

=== Muckleshoot Indian Tribe ===
The Muckleshoot Indian Tribe is a federally-recognized tribe located in Auburn, Washington. They are descended from the Duwamish and several other related peoples whose territories were mostly located along the Duwamish River watershed. They are one of the largest tribes in Washington state with a population of over 3,000.

Their reservation was established by the 1856 Fox Island Council, and is located mostly along the White River. The Muckleshoot Tribe was created by the merger of the tribes living on the Muckleshoot Reservation after the 1934 Wheeler-Howard Act (also known as the Indian Reorganization Act). They operate several tribal businesses, casinos, schools, and other services, and they work closely with state, federal, and city affairs in the Seattle area and beyond.

== Notable Duwamish ==
- Seattle (Suquamish/Duwamish, c. 1784 – c. 1866), military leader and diplomat
- Angeline (c. 1820 – c. 1896), Chief Seattle's daughter and basket maker, one of the few Native residents of Seattle during the ban
- Cheshiahud, nature guide and one of the few Native residents of Seattle during the ban
- Hwehlchtid, also "Salmon Bay Charlie," remained in Shilshole Bay
