= Sultan, Washington =

Sultan
- City
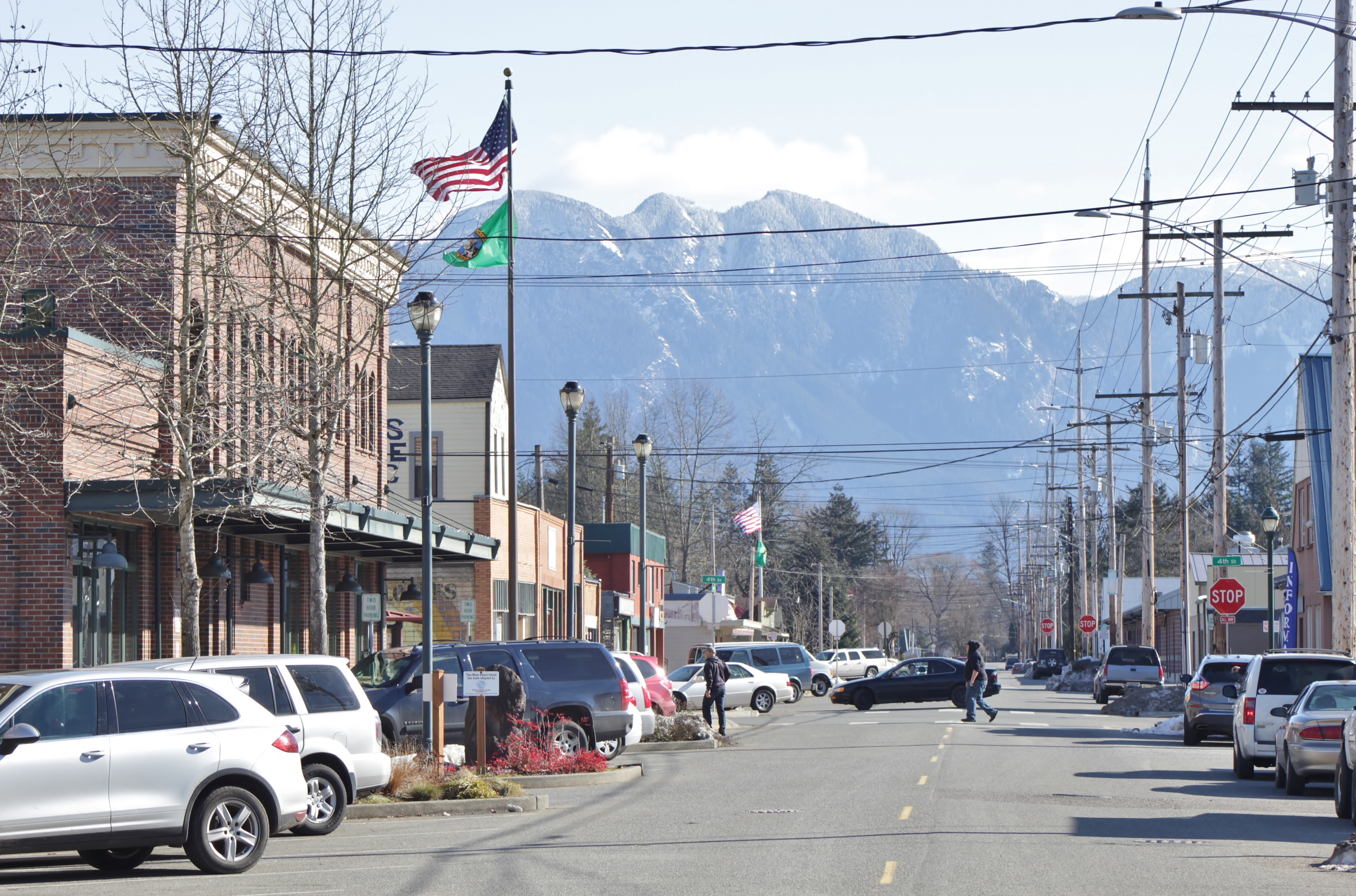
- Main Street in downtown Sultan

- Flag Seal
- Interactive map of Sultan
- Coordinates: 47°51′59″N 121°48′33″W
- Country: United States
- State: Washington
- County: Snohomish
- Established: 1880
- Incorporated: June 28, 1905

Government
  - Type: Mayor–council
  - Mayor: Russell Wiita

Area
  - Total: 3.27 sq mi (8.48 km^{2})
  - Land: 3.27 sq mi (8.48 km^{2})
  - Water: 0 sq mi (0.00 km^{2})
- Elevation: 108 ft (33 m)

Population (2020)
  - Total: 5,146
  - Estimate (2022): 6,205
  - Density: 1,571.7/sq mi (606.84/km^{2})
- Time zone: UTC-8 (Pacific (PST))
  - Summer (DST): UTC-7 (PDT)
- ZIP Code: 98294
- Area code: 360, 564
- FIPS code: 53-68260
- GNIS feature ID: 1526700
- Website: www.sultanwa.gov

Sultan is a city in Snohomish County, Washington, United States. It is located approximately 23 miles (37 km) east of Everett at the confluence of the Skykomish River and the Sultan River, a minor tributary. The city had a population of 5,146 at the 2020 census.

The city was founded in 1880 at the site of a Skykomish village and initially settled during a small gold rush. Sultan was platted in 1889, just prior to the arrival of the Great Northern Railway, and was a hub for mining and the lumber industry. It was incorporated on June 28, 1905, with a population of 700. The city was home to a Civilian Conservation Corps camp during the Great Depression and undertook several civic improvements in the post-war years.

Sultan has since become a bedroom community for large employment centers in the Puget Sound region. The city has several public parks, a historic museum, and is located near outdoor recreation areas in the Cascade Mountains. It is connected to nearby cities by U.S. Route 2.

== History ==
The area around the Sultan and Skykomish rivers was occupied by the Skykomish, a branch of the Snohomish people, prior to the arrival of American settlers. The Skykomish had a permanent village at the confluence named tʷ'tsɬitɬd, along with a nearby fishery named stək'talidubc. Following the discovery of a rich gold vein along the Sultan River, the land around the confluence was claimed for a homestead by John Nailor and his wife in 1880. Among the first arrivals to the area were Chinese prospectors, who later settled the land but were evicted in 1885. Nailor built a small store and hotel to serve miners and loggers, eventually serving as the first postmaster after the settlement received a post office in 1885. The town and river were named "Sultan", an anglicization of Tseul-tud (also known as Tseul-dan), then chief of the Skykomish tribe.

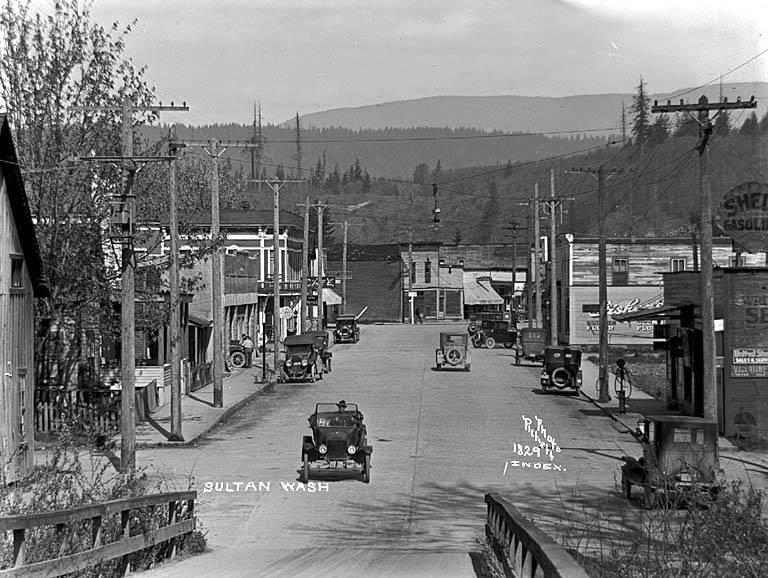
Main Street in Sultan, c. 1913

The Nailors sold 20 acres (8.1 ha) of their homestead to William B. Stevens in 1889, who filed the first plat for Sultan City that October. The Great Northern Railway placed a supply depot for its railroad workers in Sultan in 1891, meeting river steamboats and contributing to the town's early growth. Sultan gained its first sawmill in 1891 and a shingle mill in 1895, as the local economy transitioned away from mining and towards logging. Sultan was officially incorporated as a city on June 28, 1905. At the time, the city had a population of 700 people and three general stores, along with a variety of small industries. By 1912, the city had a public library, electrical service, paved streets, and was considering a plan to build a hydroelectric dam that would also provide municipal water service. A bridge across the Skykomish River was built in 1908 to connect to new farms on the south bank.

An economic slowdown after World War I led to a population decrease in the Skykomish Valley, causing Sultan voters to approve a reduction in the city's size in June 1920. The area was home to various illicit industries during the Prohibition era and experienced several major crimes, including the murder of town marshal Percy Brewster on March 2, 1927, by a serial robber who later escaped from prison before being re-captured. The area also experienced an economic downturn during the Great Depression and was home to a Civilian Conservation Corps camp that primarily dealt with firefighting and forest management. The Works Progress Administration also completed several projects in the city, including two expansions of the high school and its gymnasium in 1929 and 1939. Several major fires struck Sultan in the 1940s, including one in October 1945 that destroyed a block of buildings on Main Street and another in 1947 that decimated the Sultan Union High School.

Sultan residents participated a civic improvement program during the 1950s and 1960s that upgraded or replaced several major facilities, often with assistance from the state government. A new city hall was opened in 1954, the elementary school was expanded in 1957, and a new landing field for airplanes and helicopters opened in 1958. The city annexed 33 acres (13 ha) of rural land to the southeast in 1958 and it was subsequently developed for housing. The Skykomish River Bridge was also replaced by a new span in 1961. The Snohomish County Public Utility District (PUD) constructed the Culmback Dam on the Sultan River, creating the Spada Lake reservoir and providing electricity and drinking water for Everett and much of the county beginning in 1965.

The Sky River Rock Festival and Lighter Than Air Fair, one of the first outdoor U.S. music festivals, was hosted at a raspberry farm south of Sultan beginning August 30, 1968. The three-day festival, organized by radio station KRAB and the Helix newspaper, attracted an estimated 20,000 hippies, of whom 13,000 had paid tickets, and was considered to be a forerunner for later festivals like Woodstock. Musical acts at the festival included Santana, the Grateful Dead, Country Joe McDonald, Muddy Waters, Buffy St. Marie, and John Fahey, among others. The Sultan city government declined to allow the festival to return the following year due to the traffic and logistical issues that were experienced, including the venue running out of drinking water. The event was largely forgotten by local residents, but was revived for a one-time festival in 2017.

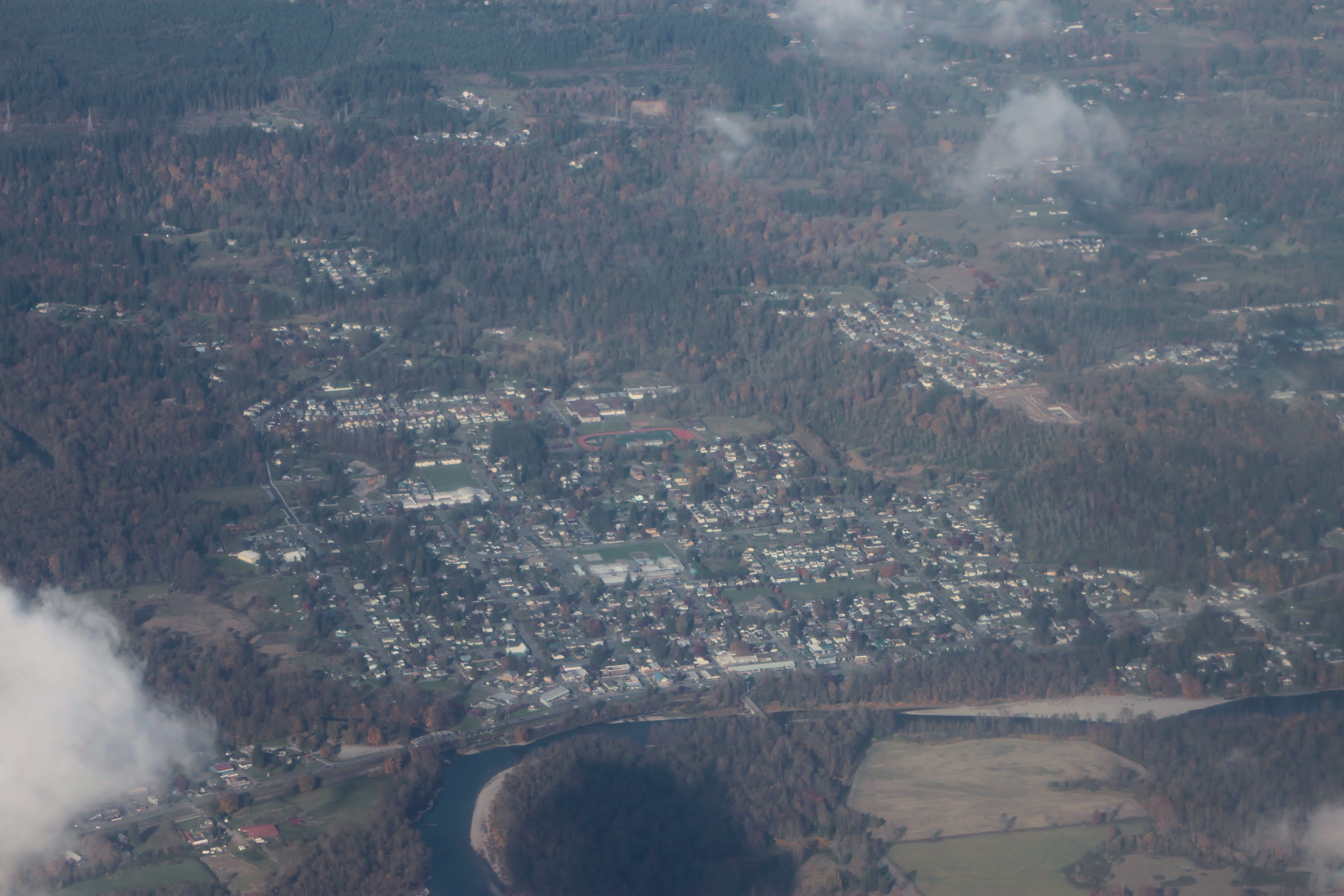
Aerial view of Sultan, showing suburban development from the 1990s and 2000s

Sultan has since developed into a bedroom community for workers commuting to Everett, Seattle, and Bellevue. Several suburban subdivisions were built in the 1990s and early 2000s, contributing to a population boom and political strife over the area's rural and small-town character. The Department of Veteran Affairs considered the Sultan area for a new national military cemetery, but ultimately chose a site near Kent. Sultan celebrated its centennial in 2005 with several festivals and the dedication of a new visitor center. Despite the population growth, the city's traditional businesses have left Sultan and caused a decline in local employment options.

During the 2007 financial crisis, a Monroe city councilmember unsuccessfully suggested merging the two cities to resolve development issues and Sultan's city budget shortfall. The Sultan city government instead began outsourcing its policing and library services to county agencies while undergoing other reforms. The city government has endorsed schemes to lure new industries, including offering tracts of land and opening new parks and a shooting range in a bid to appeal to outdoor recreation companies.

== Geography ==
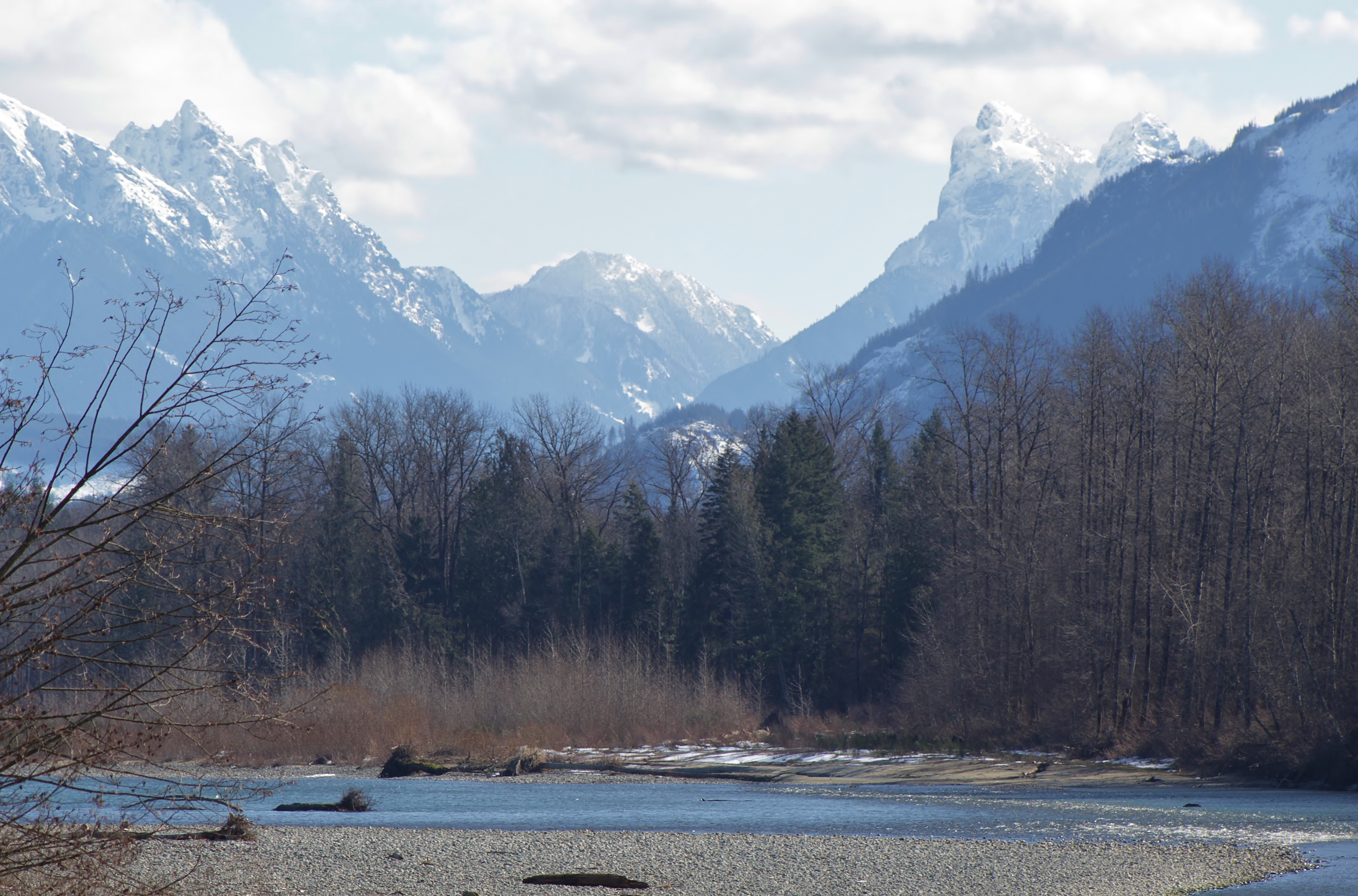
A view of Mount Index and the Skykomish River from Sultan

Sultan is located along the Skykomish River at its confluences with the Sultan and Wallace rivers in south-central Snohomish County, approximately 23 miles (37 km) east of Everett, the county seat. U.S. Route 2 and the BNSF Railway's Scenic Subdivision bisect the city from west to east, connecting it to Everett, Monroe, Gold Bar, and Stevens Pass. The city limits of Sultan are generally defined by the Skykomish River to the south, the Sultan River and Old Owens Road to the west, and several county roads to the north and east. According to the United States Census Bureau, the city has a total area of 3.15 square miles (8.16 km^{2}).

The city is located within the Skykomish Valley, which is flanked to the north and south by the Cascade foothills. Several prominent peaks of the mountain range are visible on the northern and eastern horizons, including Mount Pilchuck, Mount Index, Mount Persis, and Mount Stickney. The Sultan Basin is located on the north side of the Skykomish River and is a flat plain with some rolling hills.

Downtown Sultan is one of three identified flood zones within the city, which covers 30 percent of residents, and has experienced major floods as recently as 1991 and 2009. The city government installed three emergency sirens to alert residents of an incoming flood or another disaster.

== Economy ==
As of 2015, Sultan had an estimated workforce population of 3,709 and an unemployment rate of 10.4 percent—far above the county average of 3.1 percent. The most common employers for Sultan residents are in the retail sector (20.9%), followed by educational and health services (15.3%), manufacturing (11.9%), and construction (7.0%). Only 8.8 percent of employed residents work within Sultan city limits, while the rest commute to other areas for work. The most common commuting destinations for Sultan residents include Monroe (11.0%), Seattle (9.7%), Everett (8.2%), Redmond (6.0%), and Bellevue (5.5%). The average one-way commute for the city's workers was approximately 38.8 minutes; 80 percent of commuters drove alone to their workplace, while 9.4 percent carpooled and 3.6 percent used public transit.

Sultan businesses and employers provide approximately 1,010 jobs, and are primarily in the services and manufacturing industries. The city's largest employer is the Sultan School District, which provides 254 jobs.

== Demographics ==
Historical population
Census	Pop.	Note	%±
1910	576		—
1920	687		19.3%
1930	830		20.8%
1940	961		15.8%
1950	814		−15.3%
1960	821		0.9%
1970	1,119		36.3%
1980	1,578		41.0%
1990	2,236		41.7%
2000	3,344		49.6%
2010	4,651		39.1%
2020	5,146		10.6%
2022 (est.)	6,205		20.6%
U.S. Decennial Census

Sultan is one of the smallest cities in Snohomish County, and its population has significantly increased since the start of suburban development in the late 1960s, reaching over 3,300 by 2000. Sultan's population grew an additional 20 percent between 2000 and 2005. The city government has made various preparations for additional population growth, including new connections to the Spada Lake water supply to supplement its own system. By 2035, the city and its surrounding urban growth area is expected to have a population of 8,369.

=== 2020 census ===
As of the 2020 census, there were 5,146 people and 1,808 households living in Sultan, which had a population density of 1,571.8 inhabitants per square mile (606.9/km^{2}). There were 1,883 total housing units, of which 96.0% were occupied and 4.0% were vacant or for occasional use. The racial makeup of the city was 75.5% White, 0.9% Native American and Alaskan Native, 0.9% Black or African American, 2.7% Asian, and 0.3% Native Hawaiian and Pacific Islander. Residents who listed another race were 8.4% of the population and those who identified as more than one race were 11.3% of the population. Hispanic or Latino residents of any race were 15.1% of the population.

Of the 1,808 households in Sultan, 51.7% were married couples living together and 9.6% were cohabitating but unmarried. Households with a male householder with no spouse or partner were 17.9% of the population, while households with a female householder with no spouse or partner were 20.7% of the population. Out of all households, 39.2% had children under the age of 18 living with them and 27.4% had residents who were 65 years of age or older. There were 1,808 occupied housing units in Sultan, of which 77.4% were owner-occupied and 22.6% were occupied by renters.

The median age in the city was 35.0 years old for all sexes, 34.1 years old for males, and 35.9 years old for females. Of the total population, 29.2% of residents were under the age of 19; 28.9% were between the ages of 20 and 39; 30.3% were between the ages of 40 and 64; and 11.7% were 65 years of age or older. The gender makeup of the city was 50.8% male and 49.2% female.

=== 2010 census ===
As of the 2010 U.S. census, there were 4,651 people, 1,607 households, and 1,142 families residing in the city. The population density was 1,476.5 inhabitants per square mile (570.1/km^{2}). There were 1,752 housing units at an average density of 556.2 per square mile (214.8/km^{2}). The racial makeup of the city was 86.2% White, 0.2% African American, 1.0% Native American, 1.6% Asian, 0.2% Pacific Islander, 7.1% from other races, and 3.7% from two or more races. Hispanic or Latino of any race were 12.2% of the population.

Of the 1,607 households, 44.4% had children under the age of 18 living with them, 52.5% were married couples living together, 12.3% had a single female householder with no spouse present, 6.3% had a single male householder with no spouse present, and 28.9% were non-families. 21.0% of all households were made up of individuals, and 6.1% had someone living alone who was 65 years of age or older. The average household size was 2.89 and the average family size was 3.36.

The median age in the city was 32.3 years. 30.7% of residents were under the age of 18; 8.4% were between the ages of 18 and 24; 32% were from 25 to 44; 21.6% were from 45 to 64; and 7.3% were 65 years of age or older. The gender makeup of the city was 51.5% male and 48.5% female.

== Government and politics ==
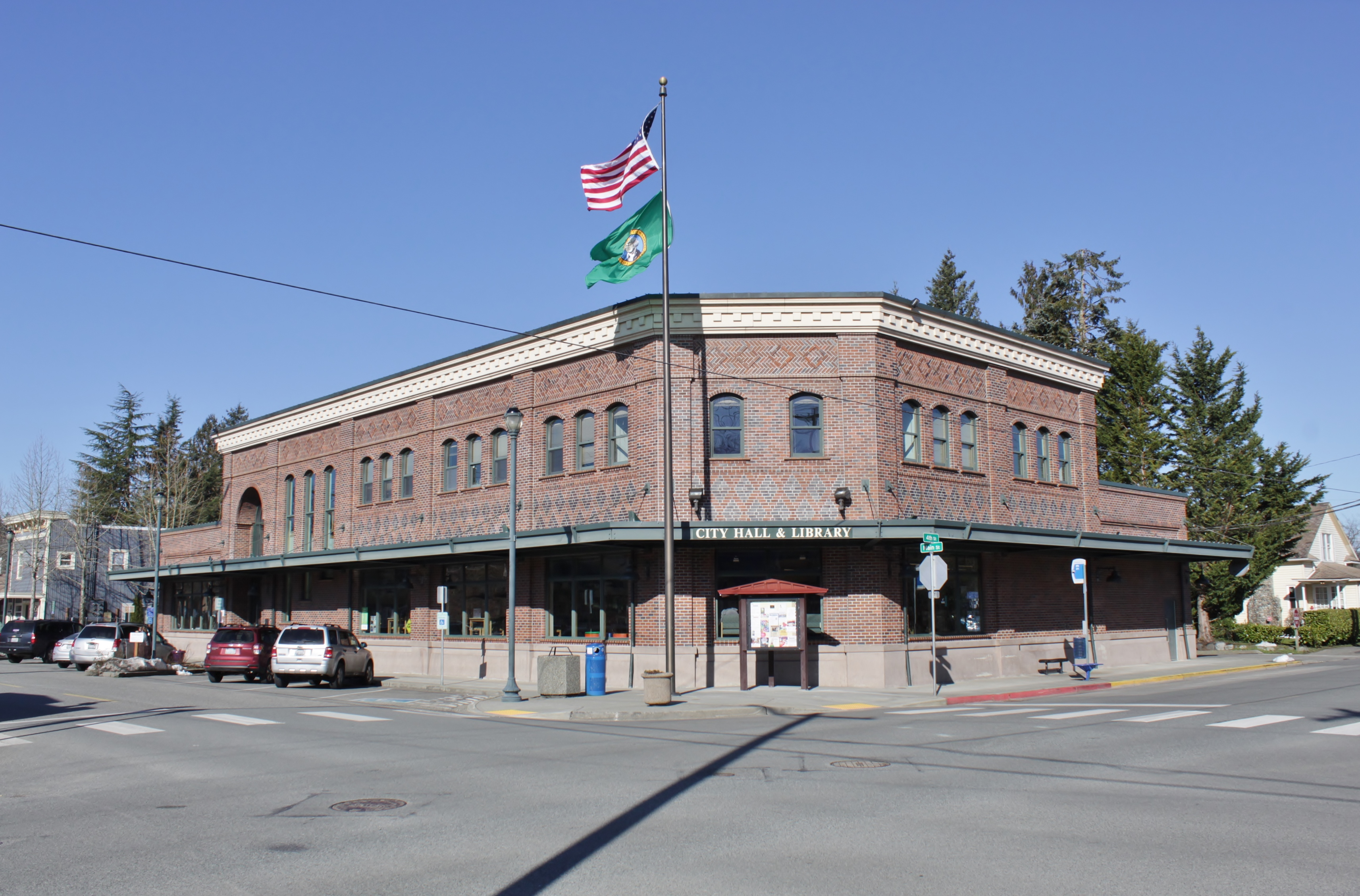
Sultan's city hall and public library

Sultan is a non-charter code city with a mayor–council government. The city council meets twice per month at city hall and has seven members who are elected to four-year terms in non-partisan elections. The office of mayor is also a four-year position and is currently held by Russell Wiita, a former city councilmember who was elected in 2019. The city hall, located in downtown Sultan, is shared with a public library operated by Sno-Isle Libraries. An attempt to switch to a council–manager government was defeated by voters in 2003.

The city government has 15 full-time employees and had a budgeted expenditure of $11.1 million in 2016. The city funds various departments and services, including public sanitation, water and sewer systems, planning, and parks. Other services, including fire services and the library, are contracted out to regional agencies. The local police department was disbanded in 2008 and transitioned to services from the Snohomish County Sheriff's Office for public safety.

Sultan's public library was established in 1927 by the Women's Improvement Club, but was later transferred to city control. It is currently operated by the countywide Sno-Isle Libraries system and located in the city hall building in downtown. The library was formerly operated by the city government, but was annexed into the Sno-Isle system in March 2008 due to a potential shutdown caused by the budget shortfall.

At the federal level, Sultan is part of the 8th congressional district, which encompasses the eastern portions of the Snohomish, King, and Pierce counties as well as the entirety of Chelan and Kittitas counties. It was part of the 1st congressional district until 2022, when the 8th district was extended into Snohomish County. At the state level, the city is part of the 12th legislative district, which also crosses the Cascade Mountains and includes Skykomish, part of Snoqualmie, and all of Chelan County except for Wenatchee. Sultan was previously part of the 39th legislative district until it was moved into the cross-mountain district as part of a redistricting compromise in 2022. The city lies within the Snohomish County Council's 5th district, which includes the Skykomish Valley, Snohomish, and Lake Stevens.

== Culture ==
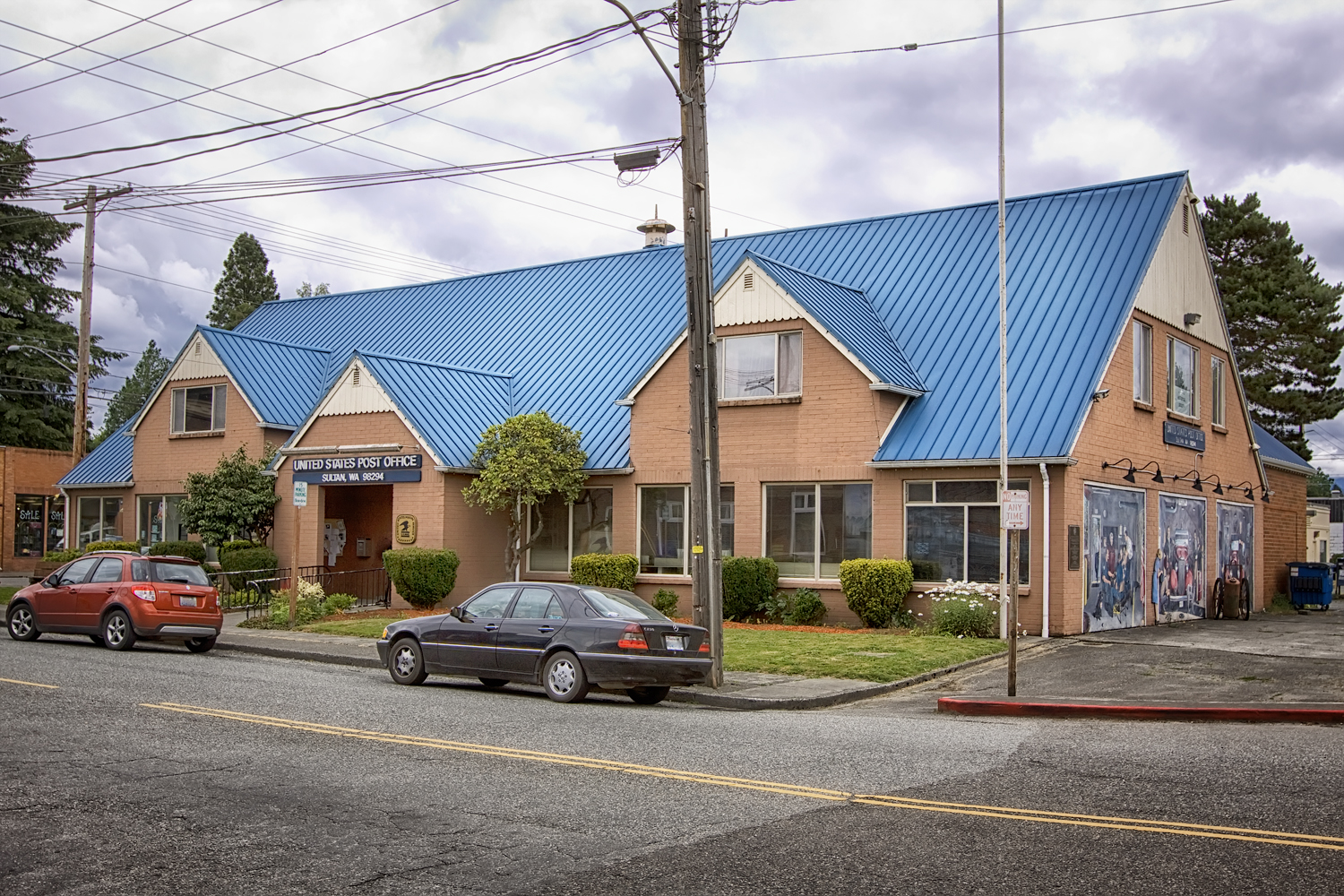
Sultan's post office, also home to a historic museum

=== Arts and events ===
The city hosts an annual three-day street fair in July, known as the "Sultan Shindig", which was established in 1983 and attracts 20,000 visitors. It includes carnival rides, street vendors, live music, games, a parade, and a car show. The celebration also honors the history of the Skykomish Valley by holding several logging contests, including axe throwing, firewood chopping, speed climbing, and wood sculpting. The 2018 festival marked the debut of the Shindig Shandy, a sweet beer produced by Timber Monster Brewing for the event. Another festival is held in late September to commemorate the return of spawning salmon to the Sultan River.

=== Parks and recreation ===
Sultan has four city parks, all located near downtown, and several athletic and recreational facilities. The city's largest park is the 76-acre (31 ha) Osprey Park, located along the eastern bank of the Sultan River and home to a regular salmon spawning ground. The park also features picnic tables, sports fields, basketball courts, and a dog park. Traveler's Park on U.S. Route 2 features a tree round from a 1,000-year-old Douglas fir that was donated to the city government in 1976 by a local logging company. Sultan opened a skate park in 2008. The city is also home to a Boys & Girls Club that opened at its current location in 2015, five years after a fire destroyed the previous club.

=== Notable people ===
- Carolyn Eslick, state legislator and former mayor
- John Koster, former state legislator and county councilmember
- Boeda Strand, basket weaver and member of the Snohomish tribe

== Education ==
Public schools in the Sultan area are operated by the Sultan School District, which also covers nearby Gold Bar and other rural areas north and west of Index. The school district had an enrollment of approximately 1,992 students in 2016, with 104 total teachers. It has one high school, one middle school, and two elementary schools (of which one serves Sultan). The current high school was constructed in 1951 to replace an earlier building that was destroyed four years prior. A $56 million bond issue to upgrade the district's four schools and construct a new administrative building was rejected by voters in 2016. The Sky Valley Historical Society maintains a small local museum in the city's post office building in downtown Sultan.

== Infrastructure ==
=== Transportation ===
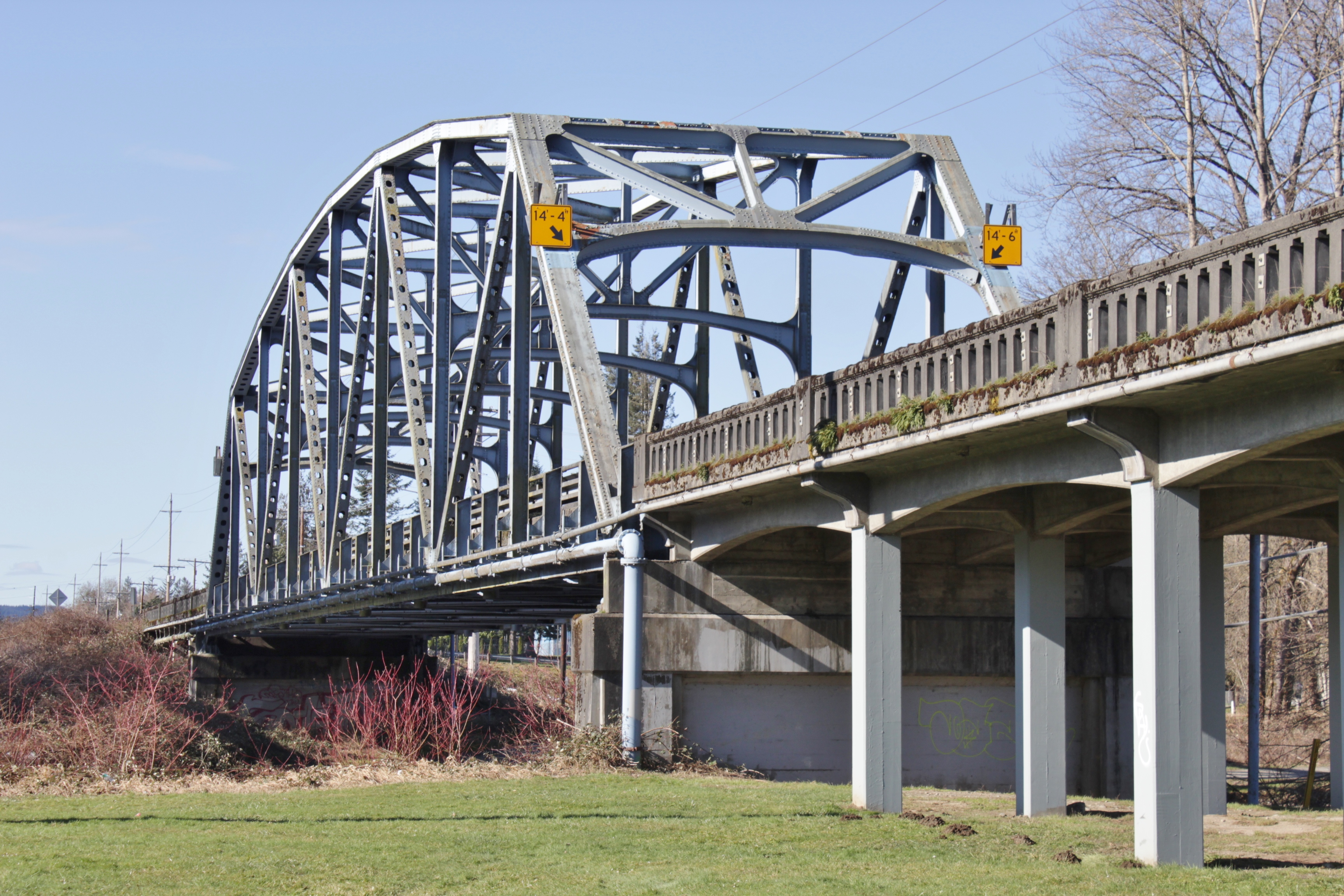
The Sultan River bridge carrying U.S. Route 2 west of downtown Sultan

Sultan is connected to nearby communities by U.S. Route 2 (US 2), which runs east–west along the Skykomish and Snohomish rivers from Everett to Eastern Washington via Stevens Pass. The nearest cities on the highway are Monroe, 5 miles (8.0 km) to the west, and Gold Bar to the east. The highway carries daily average of approximately 18,000 vehicles through Sultan, with higher volumes during summer months and ski season. Due to its high rate of accidents, including more than 2,600 in the county in the early 2000s and 100 within Sultan city limits from 1999 to 2000, the highway is considered one of the most dangerous in the state. Sections of US 2 near Sultan were rebuilt to add safety features, including roundabouts, rumble strips, warning signage, and additional policing. A plan to widen the highway to four lanes through Sultan and add additional roundabouts was endorsed by the city government in 2023. The BNSF Railway's Scenic Subdivision also runs along U.S. Route 2, connecting Everett to Eastern Washington and also carrying Amtrak's Empire Builder train. The highway and railroad cross over the Sultan River on a pair of truss bridges, while a third is planned to be built for pedestrians and bicyclists.

Public transit service along US 2 is operated by Community Transit and consists of two routes that travel from Everett Station to Snohomish, Monroe, Sultan, and Gold Bar. The city also has a small park and ride lot that is served by Community Transit. A private airfield, Sky Harbor Airport, is located near Sultan and is open to small aircraft. It has a single, unpaved runway.

=== Utilities ===
Electric power for Sultan residents and businesses is provided by the Snohomish County Public Utility District (PUD), a consumer-owned public utility that serves all of Snohomish County. The PUD operates the Culmback Dam north of Sultan, which generates electricity for the region and also provides 80 percent of Snohomish County's water supply. The Sultan city government provides water and water treatment to residents and businesses, via a separate city-owned reservoir located north of Sultan. Wastewater and stormwater is treated at a treatment plant that discharges into the Skykomish River. Solid waste collection is provided by the city government, while recycling and yard waste collection is contracted to Allied Waste.

=== Health care ===
Sultan's nearest general hospital is the Valley General Hospital in Monroe, part of the EvergreenHealth system. EvergreenHealth also operates one of two medical clinics in Sultan, which was previously an independent operation from 2003 to 2015. The other clinic, Cascade Health Clinic, remains independent.
