= Sultan River =

Tributary of the Skykomish River, northwest Washington, United States

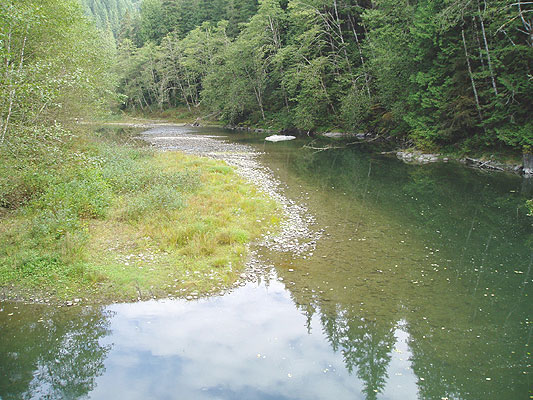
- The Sultan River a few miles downstream of Culmback Dam near a USGS stream gauge and a diversion dam

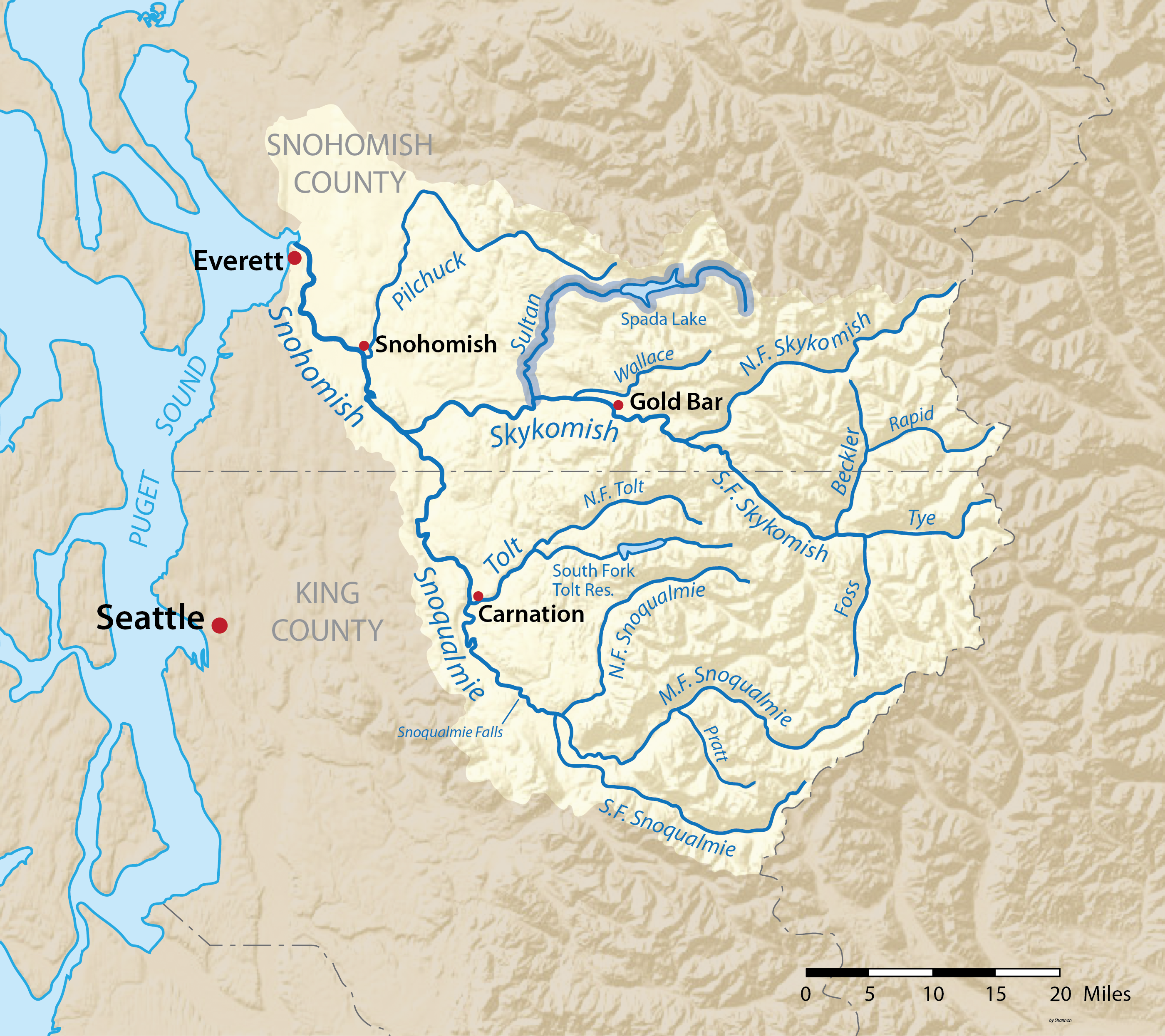
- The Sultan River highlighted on a map of the Snohomish River watershed

- Location of the mouth of the Sultan in Washington Sultan River (the United States)
- Etymology: Snohomish Chief Tsul-tad

Location
- Country: United States
- State: Washington
- County: Snohomish

Physical characteristics
- Source: Cascade Range
  - coordinates: 47°56′53″N 121°28′4″W
- Mouth: Skykomish River
  - location: Sultan
  - coordinates: 47°51′28″N 121°49′13″W
- Length: 30 mi (48 km)
- Basin size: 80 sq mi (210 km^{2})
- Discharge
  - location: USGS gage 12138160, Sultan River below Powerplant, near Sultan, WA, river mile 4.5
  - average: 735 cu ft/s (20.8 m^{3}/s)
  - minimum: 157 cu ft/s (4.4 m^{3}/s)
  - maximum: 20,100 cu ft/s (570 m^{3}/s)

The Sultan River is a river in Snohomish County in the U.S. state of Washington. It is a tributary of the Skykomish River, which it joins at the town of Sultan, Washington. The river is dammed in its upper third by Culmback Dam to form Spada Lake.

Both the Sultan River and the town of Sultan were named by prospectors for the chief of a Snohomish sub-tribe who lived on the Skykomish River in the 1870s. His name was Tsul-tad or Tseul-tud, which was anglicized by the miners into Sultan.

The Sultan River's drainage basin was subjected to intense glaciation during the Pleistocene era. The river flows through a well-defined glacially carved trench. The upper South Fork Sultan River flows through a classic U-shaped valley cut by a glacier through Quartz diorite. The Sultan's river main tributaries—the North Fork, South Fork, Elk Creek, and Williamson Creek— flow through narrow valleys to converge in the lower Sultan basin where the valley floor is relatively broad. The Sultan River exits this basin by plunging abruptly into and through a narrow canyon.

Pleistocene glaciers spread down the valleys of the Sultan River and its tributaries, merging in the lower basin. From there the ice pushed west through what is now the Pilchuck River valley. Today the two rivers are separated by the terminal moraine of an ice front that spread up the Pilchuck valley and impounded the Sultan River, creating a lake. This glacial lake eventually drained westward, creating a delta moraine. The postglacial Sultan River cut through the delta moraine, establishing its present course out of the lower Sultan basin.

== Course ==
The Sultan River originates at Crested Buttes. It flows northwest, then southwest into Spada Lake. Spada Lake, held back by the Culmback Dam, is the main source of drinking water for people in Everett. The South Fork Sultan River joins the main river by flowing into a large arm of the lake’s south shore. The Sultan River exits the lake and flows west, then south to its confluence with the Skykomish River. The river’s largest tributaries are Elk Creek, which joins just above where the river flows into Spada Lake, and Williamson Creek, which flows from remote Copper Lake and enters the lake just below where the river enters it.

== South Fork ==
Formed at the confluence of the North Fork South Fork and Middle Fork South Fork, the South Fork Sultan River flows northwest and empties into the southern arm of Spada Lake.

=== North Fork South Fork ===
The North Fork South Fork Sultan River originates at the divide between it and Salmon Creek and flows west. It joins the Middle Fork South Fork to form the South Fork Sultan River.

=== Middle Fork South Fork ===
The Middle Fork South Fork Sultan River originates on the east slope of Mount Stickney. It flows north for about 2.5 miles (4.0 km) and joins the North Fork South Fork, forming the South Fork Sultan River.

=== South Fork South Fork ===
The South Fork South Fork Sultan River begins at the outlet of One Acre Lake, flows north and joins the South Fork just above its mouth on Spada Lake.

== History ==
Prospecting began in the Sultan basin around 1870. Gold deposits were recovered from gravels along the lower river with small-scaler placer operations as early as 1869. Rich deposits were found in the basin some years later. In 1891 a major discovery was made—the so-called "45 vein", worked by the 45 Mine. Development depended on transportation, which came slowly. In 1896 the 45 Mine became the Sultan basin's first producer. A rough 20-mile (32 km) long wagon road was built from the mine to the railroad at Sultan on the Skykomish River. A trail was built over Marble Pass to Silverton.

The Sultan River has provided municipal tap water for Everett since the construction of an earthen dam in 1916, initially for industrial use and later drinking water. A diversion dam on the river was constructed in 1929 by the Everett city government to fill Chaplain Reservoir to the west. The Culmback Dam was constructed by Everett and the Snohomish County Public Utility District in 1965 to supply more water to the city and other areas of Snohomish County and later expanded in 1984. The dam also feeds a tunnel for the Jackson Hydroelectric Project that generates hydroelectric power.

== See also ==
- List of rivers in Washington
