= Sky Harbor Airport =

Sky Harbor Airport may refer to:

- Goderich Airport (Sky Harbour) (ICAO: CYGD), in Goderich, Ontario
- Skyharbor Airport (FAA LID: S63), in Dallas County, Alabama, United States
- Phoenix Sky Harbor International Airport (IATA/FAA LID: PHX), in Phoenix, Arizona, United States
- Sky Harbor Airport & Seaplane Base (FAA LID: DYT), in Duluth, Minnesota, United States
- Sky Harbor Airport (Washington) (FAA LID: S86), in Sultan, Washington, United States
