= William Shelton (chief) =

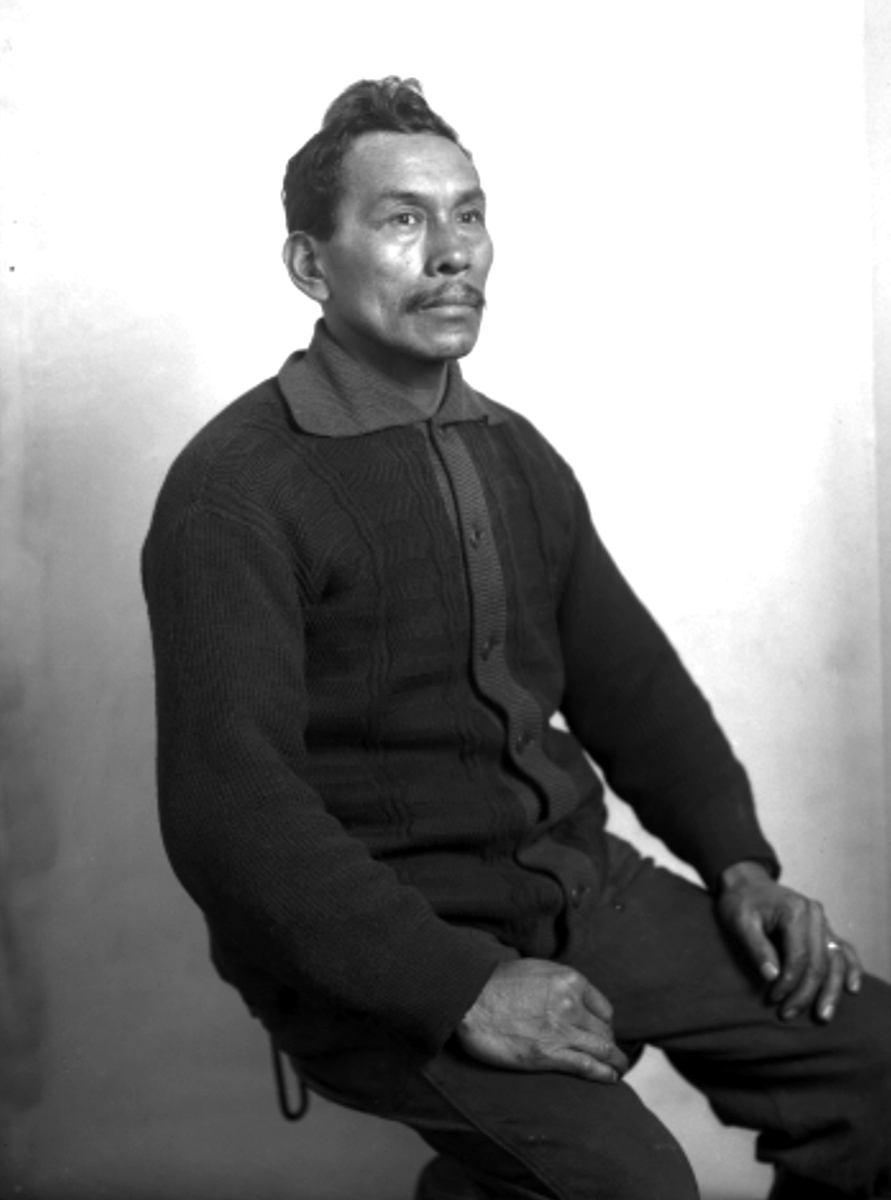

Snohomish leader

Personal details
- Born: 1869
- Died: 1938 (aged 68–69)
- Spouse: Ruth Sehome Shelton (Siastenu)

William Shelton (1869–1938) was the last hereditary chief of the Snohomish in Tulalip, Washington. He was also an author, a notable sculptor, and an emissary between the Snohomish people and the United States government.

Shelton was one of the few Snohomish to speak both English (which he learned when he enrolled himself in a mission school) and Lushootseed, the language of the Coast Salish.

During his lifetime, Shelton carved a number of story poles (often mistakenly called totem poles), very few of which still remain. One of those remaining story poles was cut in half after it began to rot. The top half now stands on the grounds of the Tulalip Elementary School. Historical photos of the complete pole exist in the digitized holdings of the nearby Everett Public Library.)

Shelton's 1925 book The Story of the Totem Pole or Indian Legends is subtitled "Early Indian Legends As Handed Down From Generation To Generation Are Herewith Recorded By Chief William Shelton Of Tulalip, Washington." The book is the only record of many legends of the Coast Salish people. At a time when the US government sought to destroy all vestiges of Native American culture in the Pacific Northwest, Shelton was able to work out a deal with Washington State governor Roland Hartley wherein he was permitted to carve a story pole in exchange for his willingness to create a written record of the oral legends behind the figures he wished to carve on the pole.

At the time of Shelton's death in 1938, the 71-foot pole was still unfinished. Members of the tribe finished carving the pole on his behalf. That pole stood on the grounds of the state capitol campus in Olympia, Washington, until November 3, 2010, when it was removed due to safety concerns.

Shelton was married to Ruth Sehome Shelton (Siastenu), who survived him by 20 years, until Oct. 4, 1958. Ruth was a fluent speaker of Chinook Jargon, a trade lingo derived from French, English, and Native American languages.

== Resources ==
- Photograph of William Shelton carving a totem pole
- Digitised images of William and Ruth Shelton, along with other tribal members
- One person's recollection of seeing William Shelton speak at a school
- Chronology of Tulalip History
