= Boeda Strand =

Snohomish basket weaver

- (Snohomish): Tsi-zak-gay
- picture Boeda Strand with Daughters Agnes and Clara

Snohomish leader

Personal details
- Born: June 22, 1834 Sultan, Washington
- Died: June 22, 1928 (aged 94) Hadlock, Washington
- Resting place: Greenwood Cemetery, Chimacum
- Spouse(s): Edward Strand, m. Dec. 14, 1877
- Relations: Brothers and sisters, Sk-tah-le-jum aka John Sultan. Boeda (Tsi-zak-gay), William Hicks, Slah-lah-hahtlh, Kah-lash-kaid; grandfather, Yah-il-lah-ilh (of the Yakima), grandmother Sktahlejamo (Snohomish)
- Parent(s): Father, Duh-lak-kay-dim (Stillaguamish), mother, Squ-qua-ka (Snohomish)
- Known for: Basketry

Boeda Strand (June 22, 1834 - June 22, 1928) was the "Head Basket Weaver" of the Snohomish tribe. She taught basketry to the Snohomish and to other tribes. Her original baskets are now worth thousands of dollars to collectors.

Her half-brother, Sultan John, is the namesake of the town of Sultan. She married a Finnish immigrant, Edward Strand, on Dec. 14, 1877.

"At the age of 90 ... she was still paddling a canoe from [the] Olympic Peninsula across the Puget Sound to Seattle."

== See also ==
- List of Native American artists
- Visual arts by indigenous peoples of the Americas
