= Cultus Bay =

Bay in Island County, Washington, U.S.

Coordinates: 47.9166074°N 122.3994225°W

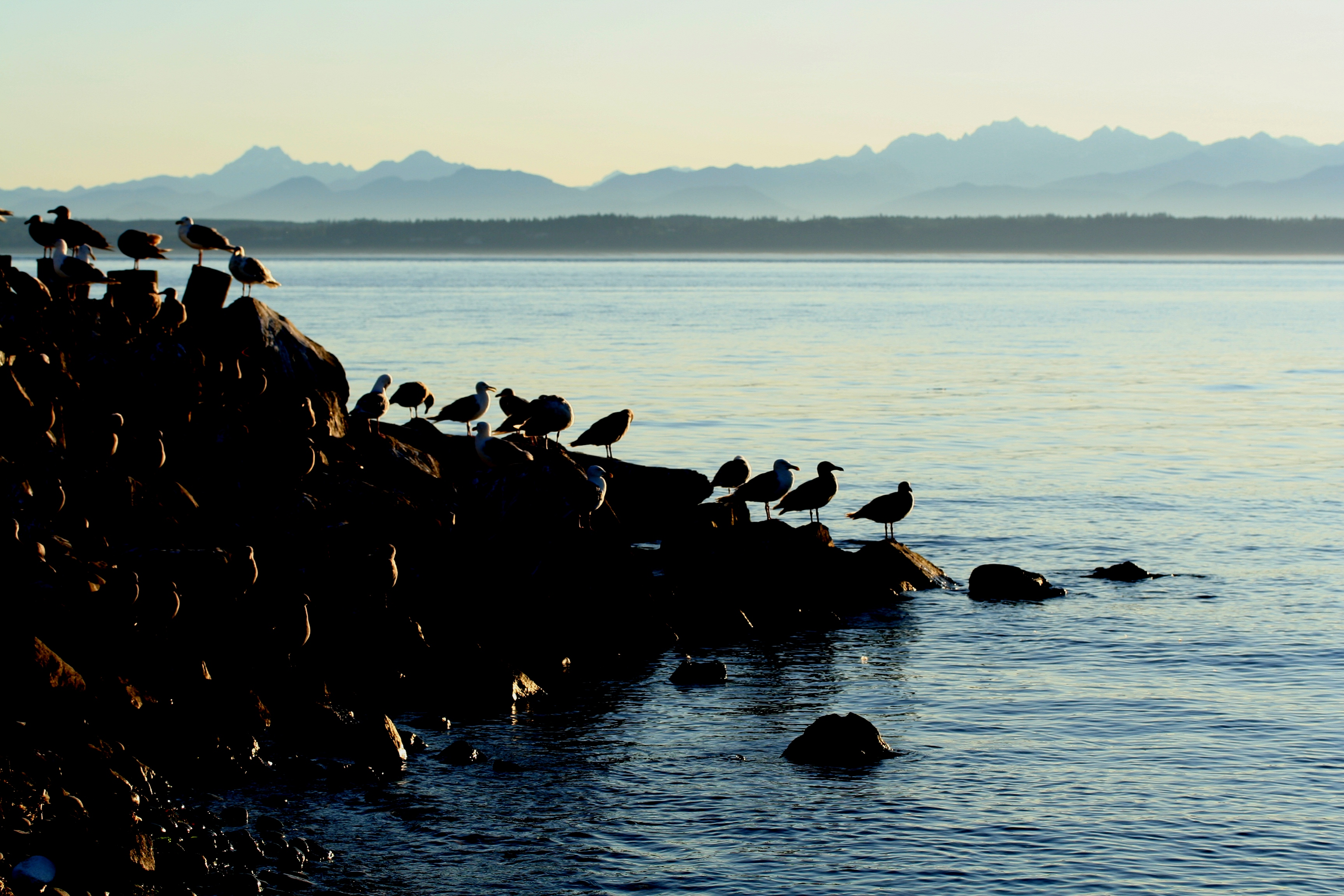
Gulls at Cultus Bay

Cultus Bay (Lushootseed: dəgʷasx̌) (Note: Also spelled dəgʷadᶻq) is a bay in Island County, in the U.S. state of Washington.

The name "Cultus" (kʰəltəs in modern Grande Ronde orthography) means "worthless" in Chinook Jargon. In Lushootseed, the name is dəgʷasx̌ (also spelled dəgʷadᶻq). There are multiple possible meanings of dəgʷasx̌. Possible meanings include "inside the basket" or "lots of little crabs."

The dəgʷasx̌abš, a Snohomish subgroup, had their main village on the sand spit on the eastern side of the bay. The village was highly influential and prestigious, and was widely known at the time. The village was composed of a great potlatch house, three longhouses, and two single-family houses. The longhouses and potlatch house each had several families living in it. The potlatch house in the village brought visitors from as far as the Duwamish and Suquamish.

Around 1855, a small stone wall was constructed around the village to keep the spit from being washed away. In 1877, most of the residents left to the Tulalip Reservation. The village was abandoned sometime after this, although by 1953, there were still three Snohomish living in the area.

The Cultus Bay Estuary has been diked off, minimizing open tidal exchange. A tide-gate and a small culvert allow for a little salt water exchange.
