= Culmback Dam =

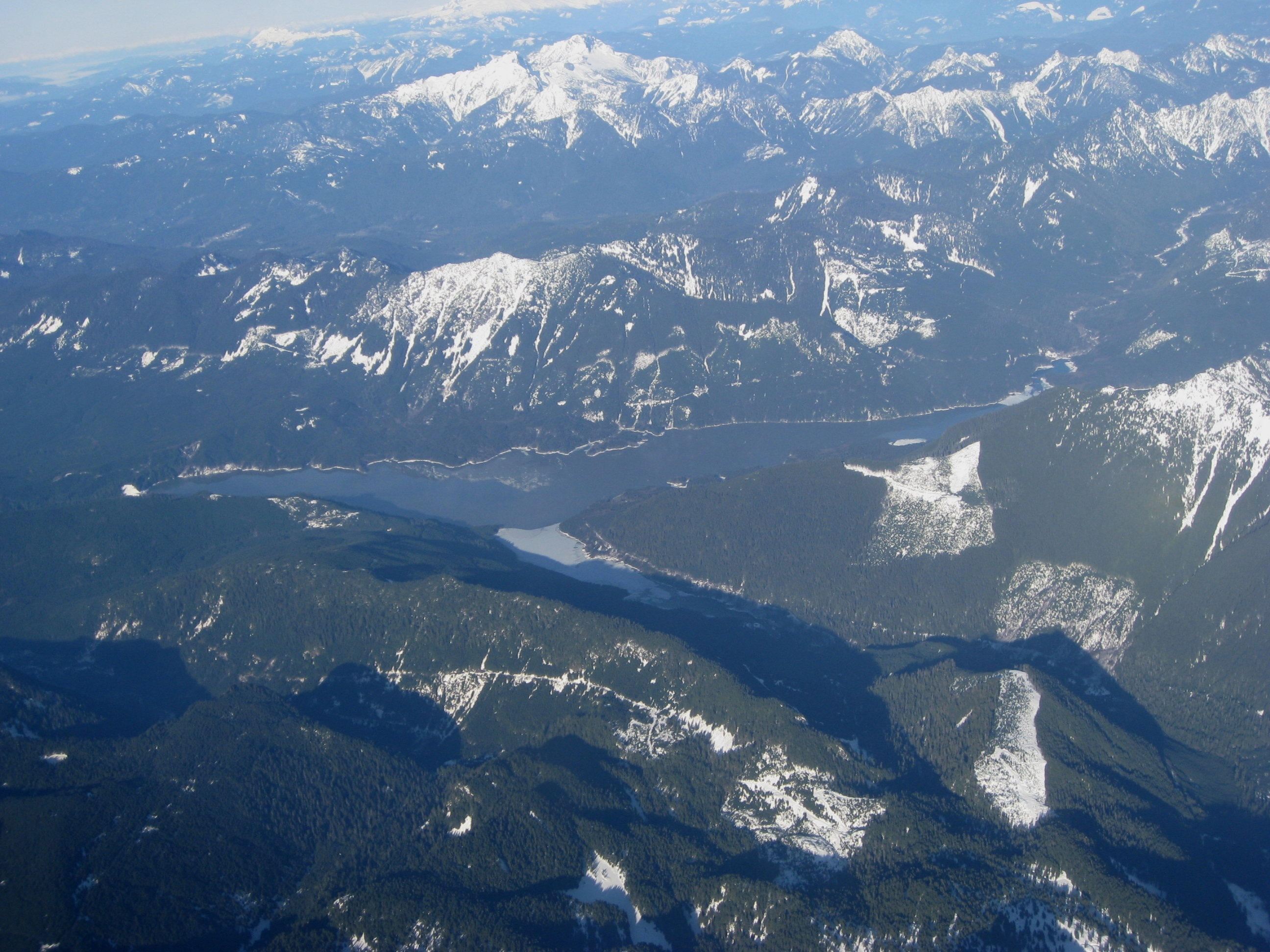
- The reservoir, Spada Lake, seen from the air, with the dam on the left end of the lake
- Interactive map of Culmback Dam
- Location: Snohomish County, Washington
- Coordinates: 47.9753°N 121.6865°W
- Construction began: 1960
- Opening date: 1965
- Operators: Snohomish County PUD; City of Everett

Dam and spillways
- Impounds: Sultan River
- Height: 262 ft (80 m)
- Length: 640 ft (200 m)
- Elevation at crest: 1,450 ft (440 m)

Reservoir
- Creates: Spada Lake
- Total capacity: 165,774 acre⋅ft (204,479,000 m^{3})
- Catchment area: 84 mi^{2} (220 km^{2})
- Surface area: 1,870 acres (760 ha)

Henry M. Jackson Powerhouse
- Commission date: 1983
- Hydraulic head: 1,165 ft (355 m)
- Turbines: 2x 47.5 MW Pelton; 2x 8.4 MW Francis
- Installed capacity: 111.8 MW
- Annual generation: 365.712 GWh(2024)

The Culmback Dam (also known as the George Culmback Dam or the Snoqualmie National Forest Dam) is a large rockfill hydroelectric and water supply dam on the Sultan River, a tributary of the Skykomish River, in Washington. Built in 1965, the dam is 640 feet (200 m) long at the crest and 262 feet (80 m) high. Its reservoir, Spada Lake, provides water for 70 to 75 percent of Snohomish County and feeds the Jackson Hydro Project, providing 112 megawatts of clean energy to Snohomish county. Some critics charge that the dam has strongly impacted the runs of salmon and other migratory fish in the Sultan River by depleting gravel and sediment needed to line the riverbed. The dam's operator counters that Culmback Dam dramatically reduces flooding events, benefiting fish populations and the surrounding communities. The dam was named in honor of George Culmback, a former mayor of Everett. Spada Lake was named after John Spada, Italian immigrant who worked for the U.S. Forest Service and helped found Snohomish County PUD.

The Dam is co-owned by the Snohomish County PUD and the City of Everett and is operated by the PUD. Water from Spada Lake is diverted through a pipeline to a powerhouse further downstream on the Sultan River. From the powerhouse, some water is returned to the river, and some is diverted to Lake Chaplain, where the water enters the Everett water supply system.

== Construction and other additions ==
Prior to 1917 the City of Everett received its water supply from Woods Creek, a tributary of the Snohomish River. Because of increasing water needs of large paper mills and factories, the city switched its water supply to the Sultan River basin via the tributary Chaplain Creek. The Chaplain Reservoir was created in 1929 with the completion of an earthfill dam, and later raised in 1942. This supply proved insufficient as well, so engineers looked to tap the main stem of the Sultan River, where an excellent dam site had been identified.

The Culmback Dam was built in two stages, or phases. Phase 1, which began in 1960 and ended in 1965, involved building the dam to a height of 200 feet (61 m), impounding a 40,000-acre-foot (49,000,000 m^{3}) reservoir. The construction done during this phase served to replace the smaller, 22-foot (6.7 m) diversion dam 6.5 miles (10.5 km) downstream on the Sultan River. Phase 2, completed in 1984, involved raising the dam 62 feet (19 m) to its present height, quadrupling the reservoir capacity. The second phase also included the pipeline connecting Spada Lake to a new hydroelectric powerhouse and from there to the Chaplain Reservoir.

In June 2016, the PUD began demolition of the dam's sluiceway to re-open the upper Sultan River basin to spawning fish.

== Site ==
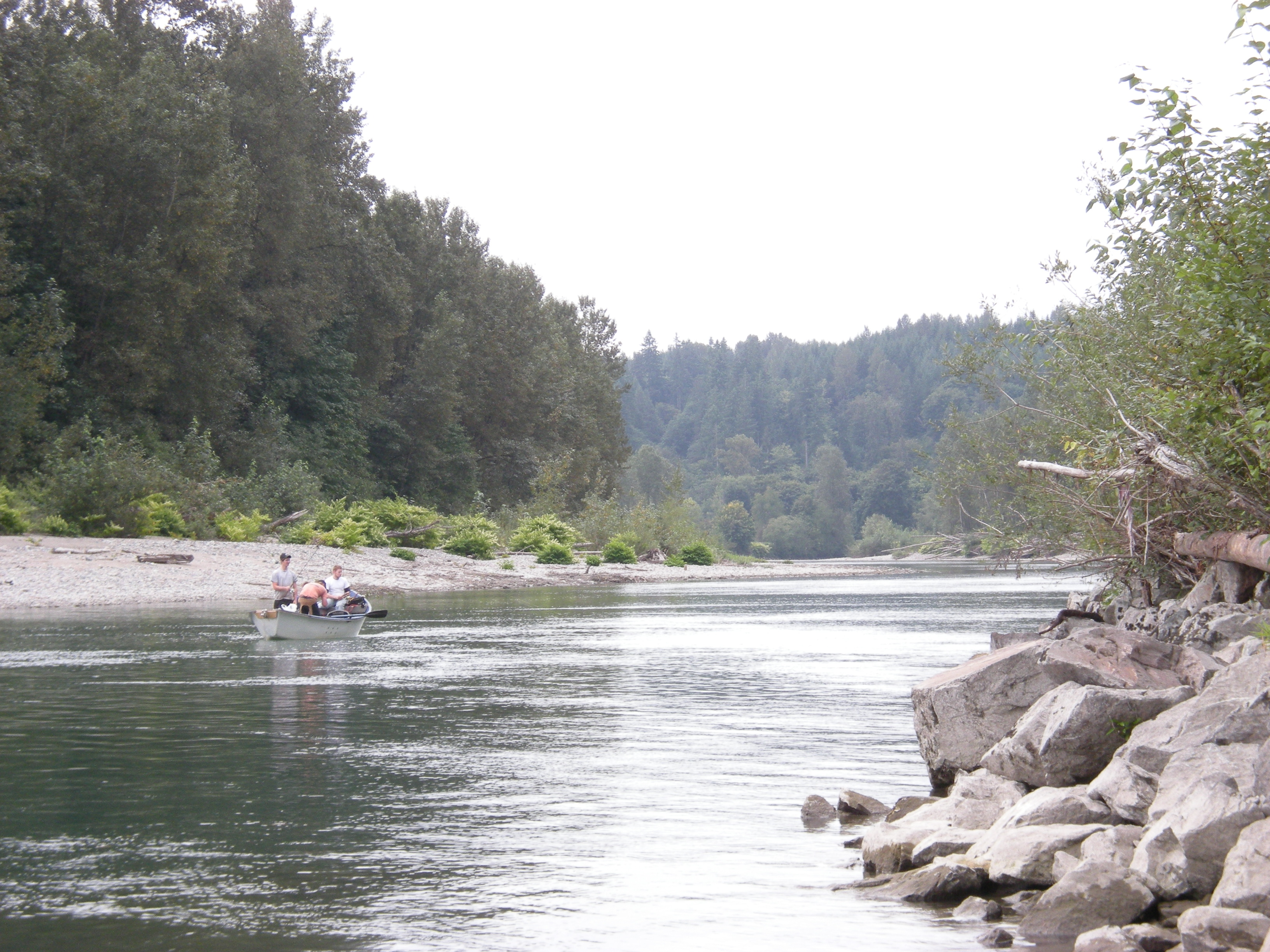
The Sultan River at Sultan, Washington.

Culmback Dam and Spada Lake received water from a drainage basin of 84 square miles (220 km^{2}) on the west slope of the Cascade Range. Although the broad valley in which the reservoir now lies predates the last Ice Age, the canyon in which the dam was built was formed only about 1 million years ago, when the Sultan River was interrupted by the 1-mile (1.6 km) thick Laurentide Ice Sheet, which rerouted the river from its original watershed, the Pilchuck River. The river eroded a narrow gorge to empty into the Skykomish River, forming an ideal dam site.

The Sultan River, formed by the convergence of the North Fork of the Sultan River and Elk Creek, enters the lake from the east. Additional major contributors are the South Fork, which forms an arm of the lake close to Stickney Ridge, and Williamson Creek, which enters from the north at the base of Big Four Mountain.

== Water supply and power ==
Spada Lake is part of the water supply of the City of Everett, Washington, serving 80 percent of Snohomish County and the Henry M. Jackson Hydroelectric Project. This water supply consists of two lakes, the other being the much smaller, 17,000-acre-foot (21,000,000 m^{3}) Lake Chaplain on Chaplain Creek, a tributary of the Sultan River. Most of the flow of the Sultan River is diverted at the dam into a 8-mile (13 km) penstock that flows to the 111.8 megawatt (MW) Jackson powerhouse further downstream, with an elevation drop of 1,165 feet (355 m). At the powerhouse, the water feeds four turbine/generator units, consisting of two 47.5 MW Pelton-type turbines, and two 8.4 MW Francis turbines. The water from the Pelton turbines is released directly into the Sultan River, while the rest of the water is piped to Lake Chaplain.

From Lake Chaplain, the water flows in four 4-foot (1.2 m) diameter pipes towards Everett. During flood events, water is also discharged back into the Sultan River through Chaplain Creek and the Sultan River Fresh-water Return Line. The Culmback Dam is able to discharge water through an inverted-bell spillway that has a capacity of 62,000 cubic feet (1,800 m^{3}) per second, which is sufficient to handle the 100-year flood flow of the Sultan River, which is calculated at 47,000 cubic feet (1,300 m^{3}) per second.

Beginning operations in 1984, the Jackson project aims to bring clean and renewable hydropower to Snohomish County. The facility consists of a single powerhouse, a switch-yard, and transmission lines—all of which are directly connected to the county's local 115 kV power-transmission network.

Generator	Nameplate Capacity (MW)
1	47.5
2	47.5
3	8.4
4	8.4
Total	111.8

== Recreation ==
The area around the dam and Spada Lake is visited by 5,000 people annually for a variety of recreational activities, including boating, hiking, fishing, and kayaking. The lake has two boat launches and prohibits combustion engines.
