= Snohomish County Public Utility District =

Public utility district of Snohomish County and Camano Island in Washington

- Type: Municipal utility
- Industry: Public utility
- Founded: 1936; Water system began: 1946; Electric system began: 1949
- Headquarters: Everett, Washington, United States
- Key people: John Haarlow, CEO and general manager
- Products: Electric utility, drinking water
- Revenue: Electric system: $708.1 million (2021); Water system: $14.9 million (2021)
- Number of employees: Electric system: 1,025 (2021); Water system: 27 (2021)
- Website: snopud.com

The Snohomish County Public Utility District is a public utility agency providing power to over 367,000 customers in Snohomish County and Camano Island. It provides water service to about 23,000 customers in the northeast section of the Snohomish County.

The utility is the second largest publicly owned utility in the Pacific Northwest and the 12th largest in the United States. It is the largest of 28 PUDs in Washington State. The PUD is the largest utility customer of the Bonneville Power Administration, a major wholesale marketer of energy in the Western United States.

== Clean energy projects ==
Arlington Community Solar Project: In 2019, a 500 kilowatt solar project was installed in Arlington. The project consist of 1620 solar panels. Utility customers were offered the option of purchasing shares to cover the cost of construction and receive revenue for the sales of electricity to the utility. All shares were sold out quickly. At the time of completion it was the largest community solar project in Washington State.

Hancock Creek Hydro Project: In 2018, the utility completed a run-of-the-river hydro project on Hancock Creek located in King County. The project is capable of generating 6 megawatts of electricity. Because the project is located upstream of Snoqualmie Falls, a natural barrier to migrating salmon, it poses no threat to salmon.

Calligan Creek Hydro Project: in 2018, the utility completed a run-of-the-river hydro project on Calligan Creek located in King County. The project is capable of generating 6 megawatts of electricity. Because the project is located upstream of Snoqualmie Falls, a natural barrier to migrating salmon, it poses no threat to salmon.

Tidal Energy: In 2007, the utility began to explore tidal energy; in April 2009 the PUD selected OpenHydro, a company based in Ireland, to develop turbines and equipment for eventual installation. The project as initially designed was to place generation equipment in areas of high tidal flow and operate that equipment for 4 to 5 years. After the trial period the equipment would be removed. The project was initially budgeted at a total cost of $10 million, with half of that funding provided by the PUD out of utility reserve funds, and half from grants, primarily from the US federal government. The PUD paid for a portion of this project with reserves and received a $900,000 grant in 2009 and a $3.5 million grant in 2010 in addition to using reserves to pay an estimated $4 million of costs. In 2010 the budget estimate was increased to $20 million, half to be paid by the utility, half by the federal government. The Utility was unable to control costs on this project, and by Oct 2014 the costs had ballooned to an estimated $38 million and were projected to continue to increase. The PUD proposed that the federal government provide an additional $10 million towards this increased cost citing a "gentlemans agreement". When the federal government refused to provide the additional funding the project was cancelled by the PUD after spending nearly $10 million in reserves and grants. The PUD abandoned all tidal energy exploration after this project was cancelled and does not own or operate any tidal energy sources.

Geothermal Energy: In 2010 and 2011 the utility attempted to find a source of geothermal energy". $400k was budgeted for this drilling in 2010, and $2.5 million in 2011. These budgeted amounts were smaller than the actual costs of drilling, which totaled $4.375 million at the time that project was cancelled in 2012. The PUD abandoned all geothermal energy exploration after this project was cancelled and does not own or operate any geothermal energy sources.

Sunset Falls: In 2011 the PUD proposed to build a dam at Sunset Falls on the South Fork of the Skykomish River, and purchased real estate around the proposed project and funded the construction of a bridge for the homeowners community there. The design of the dam changed over time, with various designs proposed. Each design was studied at length. There was substantial resistance from the local community to this project, and landslides and unstable ground in the area of the proposed project complicated the process. The project was cancelled in 2018 with the utility citing lower electricity demand. An estimated $20 million was spent on this project prior to cancellation.

== Current conservation programs ==
The utility started offering incentives, loans and other resources for small-scale solar installations in spring 2009. The utility no longer provides incentives but does provide information about installations.

Snohomish County PUD has developed and led regional conservation programs for more than 30 years. The cumulative savings equal more than 100 average-megawatts, enough to serve about 80,000 homes. The utility has weatherized more than 60,000 homes, recycled more than 33,000 older, energy-wasting refrigerators and freezers, and sold more than 12 million compact fluorescent lights and LEDs at discounted prices through a retail network. In recent years, the utility has consistently beaten its targets for conservation.

== History ==
The Snohomish County Public Utility District is a municipal corporation that was formed by a majority vote of the people on November 3, 1936. It started as a water utility on January 17, 1946, and expanded into an electric utility on September 1, 1949.

The PUD was among several investors in the WNP-3 and WNP-5 nuclear power plants planned to by built by the Washington Public Power Supply System (WPPSS) in the 1980s. Following the WPPSS's default on bonds in 1983, the agency sued to recover lost funds.

In 2005, the PUD uncovered audio tapes revealing that Enron energy traders were intentionally manipulating the market during the Western U.S. energy crisis by encouraging suppliers to shut down plants to perform unnecessary maintenance. The agency paid $100,000 to partially transcribe the tapes after it had entered into a predatory contract during an energy shortage in 2001. The PUD settled with Enron's creditors in 2007 and paid $18 million—10 percent of the original contract amount sought by the creditors.

In October 2025 the PUD changed the products it purchases from the Bonneville Power Administration becoming a load following customer. The change was made to avoid the use of expensive wholesale market power during high-demand periods. By 2027, the PUD plans to replace seven electrical substations that had become outdated or unable to cope with growing populations in areas of the county. New substations are also planned to be built in Getchell and Smokey Point.

== Services ==
The PUD provides electrical service to 373,000 homes and businesses across all of Snohomish County and Camano Island. It also provides water for 23,000 customers in areas of Snohomish County. The base residential rate is 10.26 cents per kilowatt-hour with a daily charge of 59 cents. A temporary raise in the rates was approved in January 2025 to compensate for purchased electricity during a cold wave in January 2024 and restoration of service after the November 2024 bomb cyclone.

== PUD electricity supply ==
As of 2023, the PUD's retail fuel mix consists of 76.8% purchases from the Bonneville Power Administration (BPA), 6.9% from its own hydroelectric dams, 6.5% from wind power, 9.5% from market purchases, and 0.3% from other renewable sources (including biogas and co-generation). The BPA markets wholesale electricity from 31 federal hydroelectric projects in the Columbia River Basin, one non-federal nuclear plant and several other small non-federal plants. BPA, headquartered in Portland, Oregon, is a federal agency under the U.S. Department of Energy.

The PUD purchases wind energy from the White Creek Wind Project in south central Washington, and the Wheat Field Wind Project, and the Hay Canyon Wind Project, both located in north central Oregon, along the Columbia River Gorge. The utility receives about 60 average-megawatts from these facilities.

The PUD has five hydroelectric generating projects. The Henry M. Jackson Hydroelectric Project, which began operating in 1984, is the largest and is located in the Sultan River Basin. The hydroelectric generating facility produces about 5 percent of the PUD's power needs. In addition to generating enough power for 53,200 homes using a clean renewable resource, the project also provides recreation, enhances fish and wildlife habitats, provides an element of flood control and assures an abundance of clean drinking water. The utility has developed four additional small, low-impact hydroelectric facilities for energy generation in its service area (Youngs Creek Hydro, Woods Creek Hydro, Calligan Creek Hydro and Hancock Creek Hydro).

The PUD also receives energy from a biomass project at the Hampton Lumber Mill in Darrington. Another biogas project, in Monroeuses cow manure, restaurant grease and other wastes to produce methane for power generation. In addition, hundreds of customers have worked with the PUD to install rooftop solar units and support solar projects at local schools and public buildings.

In order to finance the utility's research and development of more renewable energy sources, the PUD sold a share of the environmental qualities from its renewable energy projects.

== Bibliography ==
- Bethany Reid, Ph.D. and Thomas M. Gaskin, Ph.D., Everett & Snohomish County – A Community of New Ideas, ISBN 0-9717192-2-5
