= Sky Harbor Airport (Washington) =

Airport in Sultan, Washington, US

- IATA: none; ICAO: none; FAA LID: S86

Summary
- Airport type: Public use
- Owner: Barry A. Hammer
- Serves: Sultan, Washington
- Elevation AMSL: 282 ft / 86 m
- Coordinates: 47°52′14″N 121°47′32″W

Map
- Location of airport in Washington S86 (the United States)

Runways
Direction	Length		Surface
Direction	ft	m	Surface
7/25	1,930	588	Turf

Statistics (2012)
- Aircraft operations: 600
- Based aircraft: 3
- Source: Federal Aviation Administration

Sky Harbor Airport (FAA LID: S86) was a privately owned, public use airport located one nautical mile (2 km) east of the central business district of Sultan, a city in Snohomish County, Washington, United States. It was decommissioned in 2018 and replaced with a housing development.

== Facilities and aircraft ==
Sky Harbor Airport covered an area of 20 acres (8 ha) at an elevation of 282 feet (86 m) above mean sea level. It had one runway designated 7/25 with a turf surface measuring 1,930 by 100 feet (588 x 30 m).

For the 12-month period ending July 30, 2012, the airport had 600 general aviation aircraft operations, an average of 50 per month. At that time there were three single-engine aircraft based at this airport.

== See also ==
- List of airports in Washington
