= Snohomish people =

Lushootseed-speaking people of Puget Sound

sduhubš
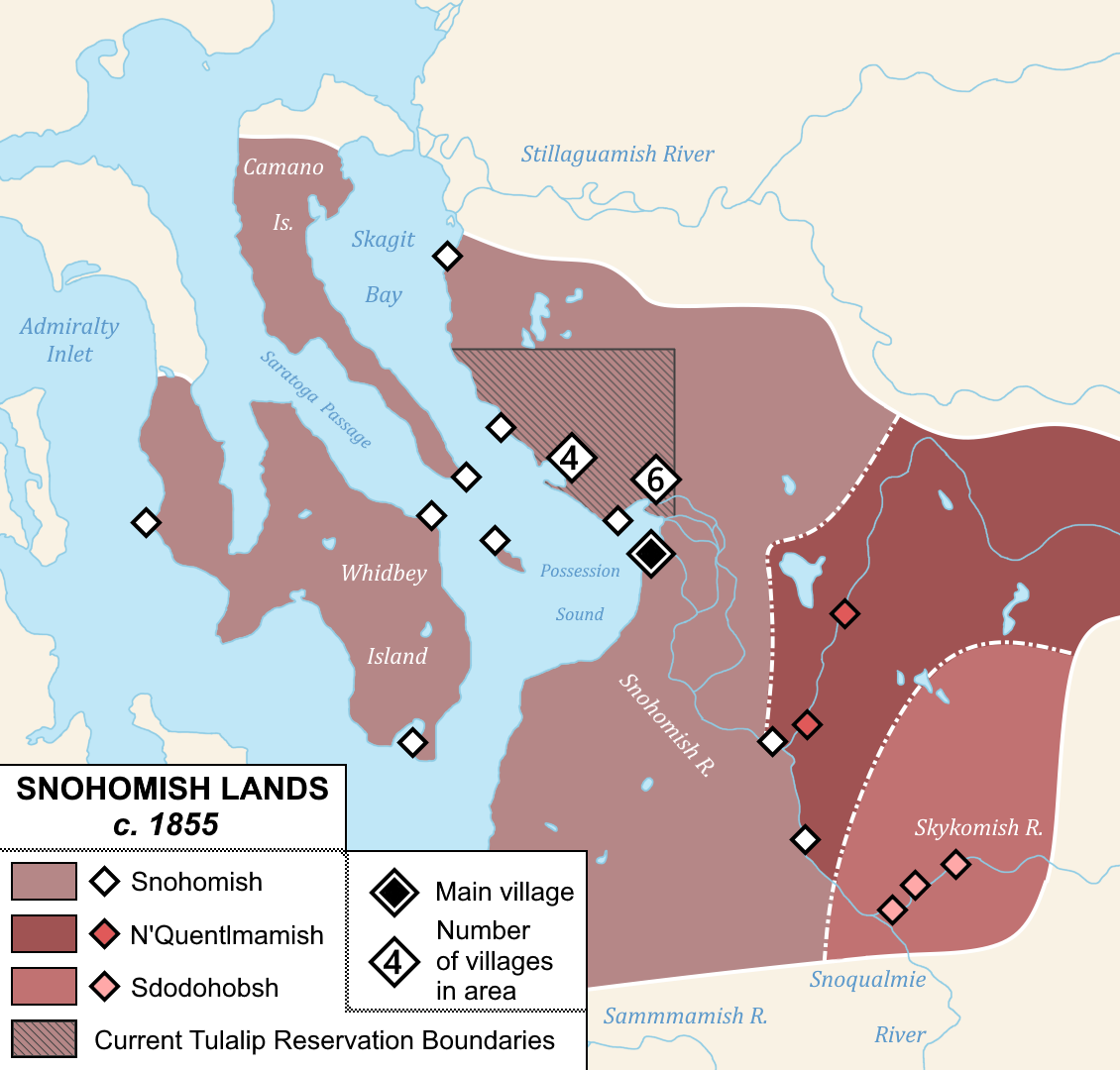
- A map of Snohomish territory in 1855 with historical village locations

Total population
- ~5,100

Regions with significant populations
- Snohomish County, Washington

Languages
- English, Lushootseed

Religion
- Traditional folk religion, Christianity, incl. syncretic forms

Related ethnic groups
- Other Lushootseed-speaking peoples, esp. the Skykomish

The Snohomish people (Lushootseed: sduhubš, [sdohobʃ], sdoh-HOHBSH) are a Lushootseed-speaking Southern Coast Salish people who are Indigenous to the Puget Sound region of Washington State. Most Snohomish are enrolled in the Tulalip Tribes of Washington and reside on the reservation or nearby, although others are enrolled in other tribes, and some are members of the non-recognized Snohomish Tribe of Indians. Traditionally, the Snohomish occupied a wide area of land, including the Snohomish River, parts of Whidbey and Camano Islands, and the nearby coastline of Skagit Bay and Puget Sound. They had at least 25 permanent villages throughout their lands, but in 1855, signed the Treaty of Point Elliott and were relocated to the Tulalip Reservation. Although some moved to the reservation, the harsh conditions, lack of land, and oppressive policies of the United States government caused many to leave.

The Snohomish today are descended from several groups, including the N'Quentlmamish and Sdodohobsh, among others. Each group was traditionally independent at the village level, but there was a greater cultural connection, and all called themselves Snohomish. They had a strong conception of their territory, and formed strong alliances between each other and outside with other peoples through marriage and diplomacy, which allowed their reach to extend far beyond their territory. Throughout the summer, they traveled across their territory and beyond to hunt, gather, and fish, while the winter was reserved for religious observances and ceremonies. Today, the Snohomish maintain their tradition of potlatching, as well as other cultural elements such as use of canoes, fishing, hunting, and gathering of traditional materials for cultural crafts.

Traditionally, the Snohomish spoke a subdialect of Northern Lushootseed, although it has fallen out of use in favor of English in more modern times. The Tulalip Tribes are in the process of revitalizing the language, as well as preserving and restoring other traditional cultural teachings, which are known in Lushootseed as x̌əč̓usadad.

== Name and etymology ==
"Snohomish" is an anglicization of the Lushootseed name sduhubš. Around the time of contact, a linguistic shift occurred where nasal consonants, such as m or n, shifted in many words to become b or d respectively. This is seen in many of the pronunciations of the oldest speakers of Lushootseed, some of which still pronounced words in the old way. When the Snohomish first encountered Europeans, their name was pronounced as snuhumš, producing the word "Snohomish" in English. After some time, the Lushootseed changed, while the English-language name stayed the same, creating the discrepancy that exists today.

The name "Snohomish" (sduhubš) was traditionally used to refer to all those who lived in villages on southern Whidbey and Camano Islands, Hat Island, the coast of Puget Sound from Warm Beach to Mukilteo, and along the Snohomish River until Snohomish City. There were many villages and subgroups within the Snohomish proper, but they all had a level of social cohesion above their own village. In total, the Snohomish had 15 villages around their territory.

The meaning of the word sduhubš has been debated by linguists and tribal historians. According to the Tulalip Tribes and several ethnologists and historians, the name means "many men" or "lots of people." William Shelton, a prominent leader of the Snohomish people in the early 20th century, said that it meant "lowland people".

Snohomish has also been anglicized many other ways, including Sdoh-hobsh, Sdohobc, Sinahomish, and Sneomuses. Today, Snohomish County, the city of Snohomish, and the Snohomish River are all named after the Snohomish people.

== Classification and subgroups ==
The Snohomish are a Southern Coast Salish people, like most of their neighbors. The Coast Salish are a related group of disparate peoples who speak related languages and share elements of culture, religion, and stories. The Southern Coast Salish branch includes all Lushootseed-speaking peoples and the Twana, extending over all of Puget Sound, except for the westernmost shore of Admiralty Inlet.

The Snohomish today are descended from several peoples, including the Snohomish proper, the Sdodohobsh, and the N'Quentlmamish. Some ethnographers and historians have historically considered the Skykomish and the Sktalejum to be subgroups of the Snohomish as well, due to their close ties with the Snohomish, with many Snohomish people seeing the Skykomish as an offshoot group. The Snohomish themselves were placed under the Snoqualmie as subordinates during treaty negotiations, a fact many Snohomish deeply resented. Each subgroup was historically independent from one another, not seen as united under the Snohomish as they are today. Furthermore, each subgroup was composed of several independent villages who were tied together based on shared drainage systems and a complex network of alliances between families. In addition, all the people who came from island villages were known as čaʔkʷbixʷ, however this was not an ethnic term, and purely a geographical identifier.

The dəgʷasx̌abš ("people of dəgʷasx̌"), also called the Whidbey Island Snohomish, were a wealthy people, widely famous throughout Puget Sound. They had several villages on the southern half of Whidbey Island. Some ethnographers disagree on whether they were a subgroup of the Snohomish or part of the Snohomish proper.

The Quil Ceda people (Lushootseed: qʷəl̕sidəʔəbš) were those who came from the many villages in the vicinity of Quil Ceda Creek, including the village at Priest Point.

The Sdodohobsh (Lushootseed: sduduhubš), also known as the Upper Snohomish or Monroe people, hailed from three independent villages in the vicinity of Monroe. Their name, sduduhubš, means "little Snohomish." They were a low-class group, compared to the high-class Snohomish proper.

The name N'Quentlmamish (Lushootseed: dxʷkʷiƛ̕əbabš, also spelled Kwehtlamamish) refers to all those who lived in villages along the Pilchuck River (Lushootseed: dxʷkʷiƛ̕əb). Their territory included the Pilchuck River drainage, including Little Pilchuck Creek and Lake Stevens. They had two villages, and have sometimes been referred to as the Pilchuck people. Like the Sdodohobsh, they were low-class, seen by the Snohomish as mean and isolative. They were party to the Treaty of Point Elliot, as a subgroup of the Snohomish, and their land was ceded by Patkanim, a Snoqualmie.

The Sktalejum (Lushootseed: st̕aq̓taliǰabš) have sometimes been classed as a Snohomish subgroup, other times as a Skykomish subgroup, and other times as a Snoqualmie subgroup. Their three villages were located on the Skykomish River, above Monroe. Once a powerful group, they were decimated by Smallpox epidemics and left to live in other villages. They were party to the Treaty of Point Elliott, where siʔalapax̌ad signed the treaty for them.

The Quadsack, also called the Kwatsakwbixw (Lushootseed: qʷacaʔkʷbixʷ), were a group who lived on Hat Slough. They had just one village, and have been variously considered a subgroup of the Snohomish or of the Stillaguamish. Although they were once an independent group, they were closely related to both the Snohomish and the Stillaguamish, and got absorbed after the Smallpox epidemics.

== History ==
=== Pre-contact ===
For thousands of years, the Snohomish hunted, fished, and gathered around their territory. Ethnologist Colin Tweddell estimated that the pre-contact Snohomish population was in the thousands, possibly over 6,000. In the early 1800s, there were smallpox and measles epidemics which ravaged the population.

Around 1820, several Snohomish villages were decimated by a large landslide at Camano Head (Lushootseed: x̌ʷuyšəd), the southern tip of Camano Island. A massive landslide occurred when the bluff collapsed, burying a village directly below it. Another village on Hat Island (Lushootseed: č̓əč̓əsəliʔ) was wiped out by a large tidal wave caused by the landslide. Residents of the village at č̓əč̓əsəliʔ saw the landslide happen, and some managed to escape to higher ground before the impact of the wave. The wave also almost destroyed the largest Snohomish village of hibulb. The landslide was catastrophic, with hundreds of casualties. It was during the clamming season, and many who were visiting x̌ʷuyšəd and č̓əč̓əsəliʔ were buried and drowned.

Around 1824, the Snohomish had been warring with the Klallam and Cowichan people for some time. In December of that year, they met the trading party of John Work, a Hudson's Bay Company trader. The Snohomish were among the tribes that later traded with the Hudson's Bay Company at Fort Nisqually, established in 1833 at the southern tip of Puget Sound. They also met Roman Catholic missionaries who entered their lands in the early 1840s.

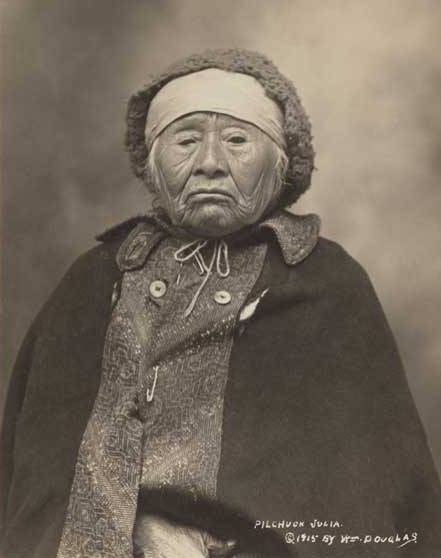
Pilchuck Julia (c. 1915), a Snohomish woman who lived at what is now the town of Snohomish, Washington. She attended the Treaty of Point Elliot in 1855.

=== Treaty of Point Elliot ===
In 1855, a council was held at what is now Mukilteo, Washington (Lushootseed: bək̓ʷəɬtiwʔ) in order for then-Territorial Governor Isaac Stevens to draft a treaty that would cede the lands of the people living in the northern Puget Sound region to the United States. The Snohomish were party to this treaty, and about 350 Snohomish attended. During the treaty process, the Snohomish were made subordinate to the Snoqualmie by Stevens, and the treaty was signed for the Snohomish by Patkanim (paƛ̕adib), a Snoqualmie leader. This was widely resented by the Snohomish. Patkanim, along with nine Snohomish "sub-chiefs," authorized the cession of all Snohomish lands to the United States.

The Snohomish signers of the Treaty of Point Elliott

- S'hootsthoot
- Snahtalc (aka Bonaparte)
- Heuchkaman (aka George Bonaparte)
- Tsenahtalc (aka Joseph Bonaparte)
- Ns'skioos (aka Jackson)
- Watskalahtchie (aka John Hobststhoot)
- Shehtsoolt (aka Peter)
- Sahahhu (aka Hallam)
- John Taylor

During the 1855-1856 Puget Sound War, the Snohomish remained neutral. This upset American authorities, who felt that the Snohomish were "doing nothing" for the American government, and one Indian Agent recommended that the tribe be "disbanded." During this period, the Snohomish were encouraged to remove to a temporary reservation on Whidbey Island, so as to lessen the influence of the tribes fighting the American government.

According to Article 2 of the treaty, the original plan for the Snohomish under the treaty was that they would be relocated to a temporary Snohomish reservation, alongside the Skykomish, Snoqualmie, and Stillaguamish peoples. However, the treaty commission vastly underestimated the number of people who were living along the Snohomish and Stillaguamish drainage systems. In 1854, the treaty commission were under the impression that there were less than 400 people living along both watersheds. By 1856, reports said that the number of people living along the rivers was as high as 1,800. The two sections of land (1,280 acres) set apart for the Snohomish, Snoqualmie, Skykomish, and Stillaguamish peoples was wholly inadequate according to anthropologist Barbara Lane, and all four tribes would never have been able to support themselves on such a reservation.

At a later date, the Tulalip Reservation was established, as outlined in Article 3. It was originally planned to be a 36-section parcel of land to which all peoples living in western Washington would be relocated. The Tulalip Reservation encompassed the Snohomish reservation, and it was incorporated into the Tulalip Reservation. On December 3, 1873, the Tulalip Reservation was expanded by an executive order. It was enlarged to 24,320 acres.

=== Reservation Era ===
Although the Tulalip Reservation was initially chosen for its timber and nearby sawmill, funds were never given to rebuild the dilapidated sawmill. Not only that, but in 1874 it became illegal for the residents of the reservation to actually log their own forests, and all work on the reservation was disallowed. This resulted in many leaving the reservation to find logging jobs elsewhere. Eventually, logging was made legal again, but by 1883, most of the forests on the reservation had been logged. Parts of the reservation that weren't forested, about 1,200 acres, were swampland, and the intent was for the residents to drain the swampland for farming. However, the soil quality was poor, and little funding was given for draining the swamps. Because of these problems, the Indian Agent at the time wrote: "possessed of few resources which are likely to kindle the flame of jealousy in the whites, it is preeminently the most proper selection which the Government has ever made for an Indian Reservation."

The Tulalip Reservation was severely overcrowded. Although people were trying to move to the reservation as required, there simply was not enough land. By 1909, the Tulalip Reservation had been completely allotted. Some lost their allotted land, while others never got any allotment at all. Most Snohomish did in fact relocate to the Tulalip reservation early on, however, due to the lack of land, most returned to their traditional homelands. In 1919, 360 Snohomish lived off-reservation, twice as many as those living on-reservation.

In addition to the overcrowding, disease, and lack of work, the oppressive policies of the American government, including suppression of traditional language and religion, caused many people to leave the reservation during the early reservation period.

In 2008 membership in the unrecognized Snohomish Tribe of Indians had increased to 1,200, although it is unknown what percentage of the members are Snohomish. As of 2023, there are at least 5,100 members of the Tulalip Tribes, the majority of whom are of Snohomish ancestry.

== Territory and villages ==
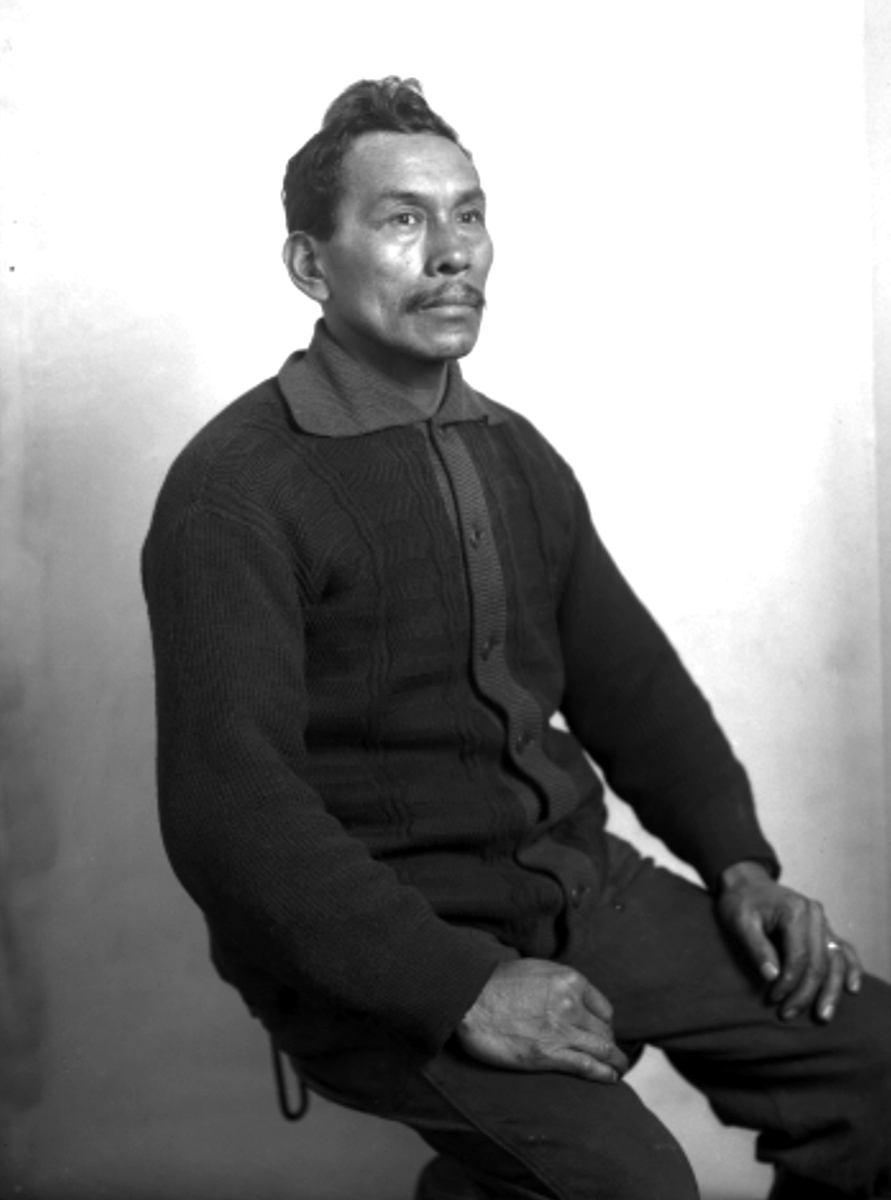
William Shelton (c. 1913), a Snohomish leader from dəgʷasx̌

The core of Snohomish territory was the lower Snohomish River, particularly the area near the mouth.The historical extent of Snohomish territory stretched over Snohomish, King, and Island counties, including Whidbey Island, Camano Island, Hat Island, the eastern shoreline of Puget Sound, the Snohomish River, and the lower reaches of the Skykomish River. The Snohomish controlled the entirety of Whidbey Island south of a portage at what is now Greenbank (k̓ʷik̓ʷaac̓əb). It also encompassed most of Camano Island, controlling the western side of the island south of Point Demock and the eastern side south of Livingston Bay (ʔaʔacəp). On the mainland, the southernmost border of Snohomish territory along the coast was at what is now Richmond Beach, south of Edmonds. The northernmost border encompassed Warm Beach (dxʷtux̌ʷub), and continued easterly to Jordan and southerly to Granite Falls. To the east and west, Snohomish territory encompasses the entire Snohomish River drainage, excluding the Snoqualmie River, and including the Skykomish River to just downriver of Elwell Creek. The eastern boundary is generally the small mountain range between Mount Pilchuck and Bald Mountain.

Like other Puget Sound tribes, the Snohomish historically had a strong conception of their territory and its boundaries. People were aware of tribal boundaries and where they were, and there was mutual respect for the boundaries of other tribes. Alliances and friendship between nations allowed for arrangements which could allow others to cross into the territory of one's group. Through this system of alliances, the Snohomish allowed other allied peoples to use certain areas of their territory. Snohomish-controlled areas on Whidbey Island were shared with the Skagit, the Kikiallus, the Snoqualmie, and the Suquamish. The Stillaguamish, Snoqualmie, and Kikiallus were allowed to use certain areas of Snohomish Camano Island. The Snoqualmie and Duwamish were allowed to visit Hat Island. Tulalip Bay was shared with the Stillaguamish and Snoqualmie, and the southern Puget Sound coast owned by the Snohomish was shared with their southern Duwamish neighbors. Likewise, many of these groups allowed the Snohomish to visit their lands for hunting, fishing, and gathering in return.

=== Villages ===
The Snohomish and their associated groups permanently occupied at least 25 villages throughout their territory. Villages were composed of at least one longhouse, and larger villages such as hibulb often had smaller houses and a potlatch house (sgʷigʷialʔtxʷ) for specifically for ceremonies. Some villages, notably the village at hibulb, had large cedar palisades which protected the village. Low class villages, such as the village at č̓ƛ̕aʔqs, did not.

List of Snohomish villages
Group	Name	Anglicization(s)	Location	Notes
Snohomish (sduhubš)	šəƛ̕šəƛ̕šɬ		Bush Point, Whidbey Island	Three longhouses and a potlatch house
Snohomish (sduhubš)	dəgʷasx̌		Cultus Bay	Five longhouses, two smaller houses, and a potlatch house; center of the Whidbey Island Snohomish; people living here were called dəgʷasx̌abš
Snohomish (sduhubš)	č̓əč̓ɬqs		Sandy Point, Whidbey Island	Famous potlatch house
Snohomish (sduhubš)	č̓əč̓əsəliʔ		Hat Island	Several longhouses; village was destroyed by a tidal wave in early 19th century, then it was a summer camping spot
Snohomish (sduhubš)	x̌ʷuyšəd	Whee-shud	Camano Head	Destroyed by a landslide in early 19th century. After its destruction, it was only a summer camping spot.
Snohomish (sduhubš)	dxʷtux̌ʷub		Warm Beach	Mixed Snohomish, Stillaguamish, and Quadsack village
Snohomish (sduhubš)	q̓ʷx̌ʷabqs		Tulare Beach	
Snohomish (sduhubš)	dxʷlilap	Tulalip	Tulalip Bay	There were four closely located villages within the bay
Snohomish (sduhubš)	č̓ƛ̕aʔqs		Priest Point	Three longhouses and a potlatch house; this was a low class village
Snohomish (sduhubš)			Between č̓ƛ̕aʔqs and qʷəl̕sidəʔ	
Snohomish (sduhubš)	qʷəl̕sidəʔ	Quil Ceda	Quil Ceda Creek	Very old village with a potlatch house; along the creek there were up to 30 houses and 5 villages; people living along it were qʷəl̕sidəʔəbš
Snohomish (sduhubš)	sʔucid	S'watsida	South of the bridge over the creek	An old ferrying spot for travel across the creek
Snohomish (sduhubš)	dxʷqʷtaycədəb		Sturgeon Creek	At least one longhouse and a potlatch house
Snohomish (sduhubš)	qʷəq̓ʷq̓ʷus		Upriver of the bridge over the creek, near a small bluff	At least one longhouse
Snohomish (sduhubš)			Upriver from qʷəq̓ʷq̓ʷus	Post-treaty village; one longhouse
Snohomish (sduhubš)	hibulb	Hibulb, Hibolb	Preston Point, Everett	Main Snohomish village; four 100'x40' longhouses, many small houses, and a large potlatch house; very high-class and prestigious village
Snohomish (sduhubš)	sbadaʔɬ		Snohomish	Large village, unknown number of houses
N'Quentlmamish (dxʷkʷiƛ̕əbabš)	dxʷkʷiƛ̕əb		Pilchuck River, near the mouth	Main N'Quentlmamish village
N'Quentlmamish (dxʷkʷiƛ̕əbabš)			Machias	Two houses
Sdodohobsh (sduduhubš)	səxʷtəqad		Three miles southwest of Monroe	Large potlatch house, at least three longhouses
Sdodohobsh (sduduhubš)	t̕aq̓tucid		Two miles southeast of Monroe	Four or five longhouses
Sdodohobsh (sduduhubš)	bəsadsx̌		Monroe	Main Sdodohobsh village; also called gʷəɬ sduduhubš ʔalʔalʔal, 'Houses of the Sdodohobsh'

== Culture ==
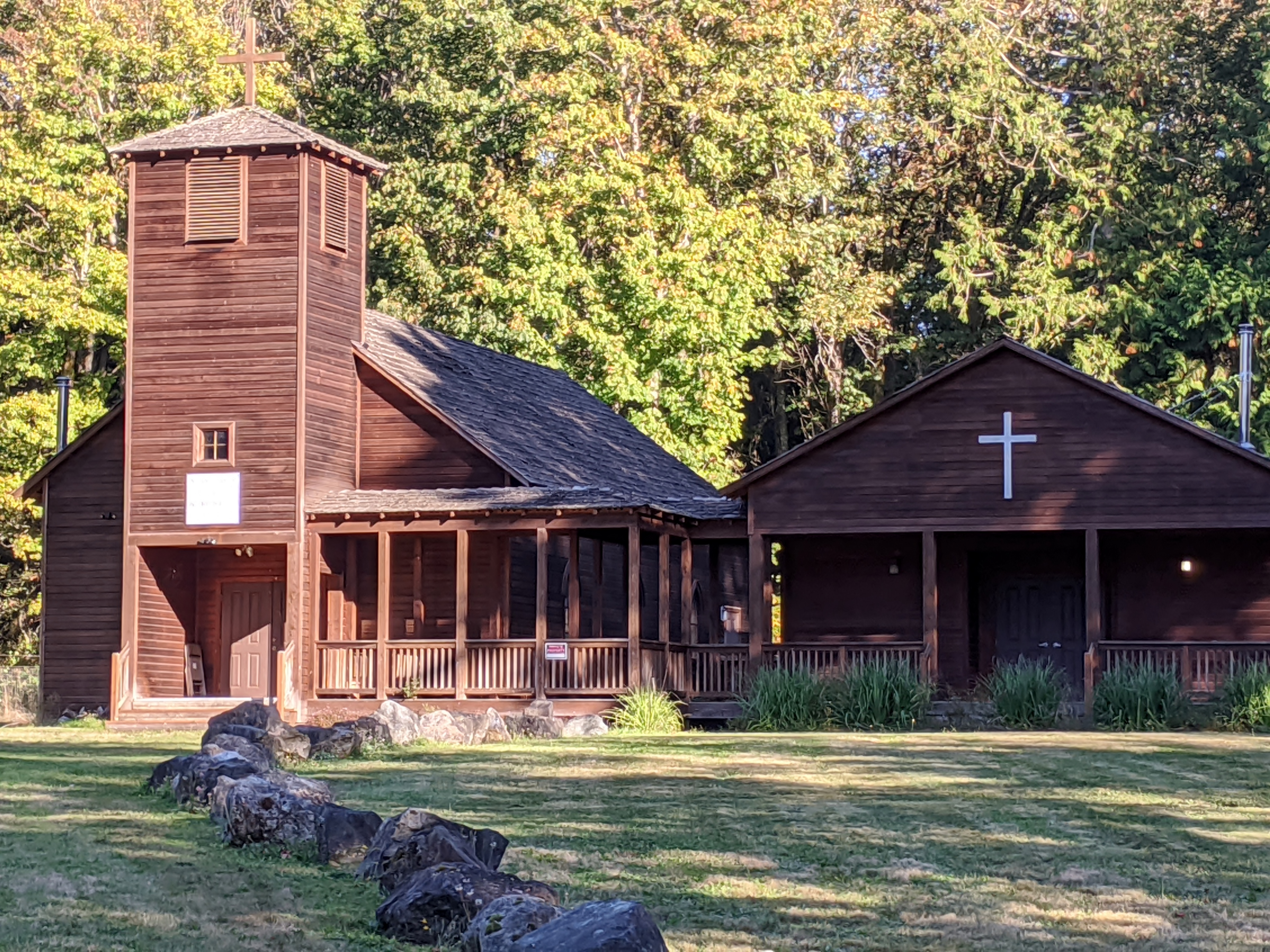
The Indian Shaker Church on the Tulalip Reservation

=== Religion ===
One of the primary beliefs of traditional Snohomish religion is in the spirit power or guardian spirit (sqəlalitut). Spirit powers are used in many ways, from daily activities to warfare. For example: a hunter might sing their spirit song during their hunt, and if they heard the spirit singing back, they would be successful. Certain professions were only open to those with certain helpful spirits. Traditionally, Snohomish children were trained from a very young age to go on a spirit power journey (ʔalacut) to remote locations where they would receive a power. Popular places to get spirit powers were at Stevens Pass and Lake Getchel in the Cascades. Generally, a spirit quest would take place during the spring, and it was best done during a storm. In order to acquire a spirit power, one had to do something challenging. This usually involved fasting, bathing many times a day, and diving deep into water. The longer someone fasted, or the more difficult the challenges they overcame, the more powerful spirit they would obtain. Spirits could also be obtained later in life due to overcoming personal challenges or developing skills. Traditionally, both women and men could get spirits, although men tended to get more powerful spirits.

The winter was historically a common time for many religious ceremonies, but especially prominent was the winter spirit power ceremony (spigʷəd). In Snohomish religion, spirit powers travel around the world but return during the winter. When a spirit power returns, a person feels sick and hears their spirit power song. When this happens, one would traditionally host a large ceremony, often lasting several days, in which they would sing, dance, and give out gifts to friends and family. Unlike other ceremonies where people sang their spirit power songs alone, in this ceremony, friends were invited to help sing and dance. At the end of this ceremony, a person would usually give a potlatch.

Snohomish religion also features the sgʷədilič, which is a type of spirit in the shape of a board. The sgʷədilič tradition emerged in the Puget Sound region during the early historic period and a Snohomish woman claimed to be the first to get it. The boards are painted red and black and were about one-and-a-half feet long with a hole in it. This spirit is said to help people in catching fish, as well as searching for people lost in the woods. During the winter ceremony, people with this spirit did not perform their spirit dance themselves; rather, they hired four men to dance for them in pairs. In each pair, one danced with a larger board and one danced with a smaller board, putting their hand through the hole in the board and dancing counter-clockwise. The sgʷədilič dances traditionally lasted four days and four nights, and the songs were sung four times fast and four times slow.

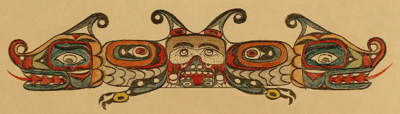
A representation of an ʔayahus

Traditionally, the most powerful and desired spirit powers was tiyuɬbax̌ (also spelled tiyuɬbax̌əd or tiyuɬəbax̌ad). This spirit power is primarily a wealth spirit which helps one acquire wealth and property in life. Someone with tiyuɬbax̌ was said to receive more gifts during a potlatch than others. Another highly powerful spirit is tubšədad, which is a war spirit which came to people in time of war or courage. People with tubšədad often were great and famous warriors. Both of these spirits were found only in deep water. The only spirit which one did not ever want to meet was the ʔəyahus (Ayahos). The Ayahos is a highly-powerful elk-snake spirit which has two horns and lives in the forest. Hunters which follow this spirit are believed to die soon after meeting it.

Also a feature of traditional Snohomish religion are shamanistic spirits. Shamans, also called doctors, (dxʷdahəb), are marked by their ability to get unique spirits which can be used to heal or hurt people. Traditionally, a dxʷdahəb did not have a winter dance, and their spirits are said to remain with them at all times. Unlike many other Indigenous peoples of the Northwest Coast, the Snohomish did not have secret societies for their shamans. The traditional belief is that shamans can cure people from many things, but those wounded in war could not be cured by a shaman, only by their own spirit powers. Shamans could also restore the spirit of a person who had their spirit power stolen. It was said that a shaman showed their power by wearing a stone or belt which could turn into a snake.

After colonization, many Snohomish also converted to the Indian Shaker Church, a syncretic Christian denomination. A Shaker church was built at Tulalip.

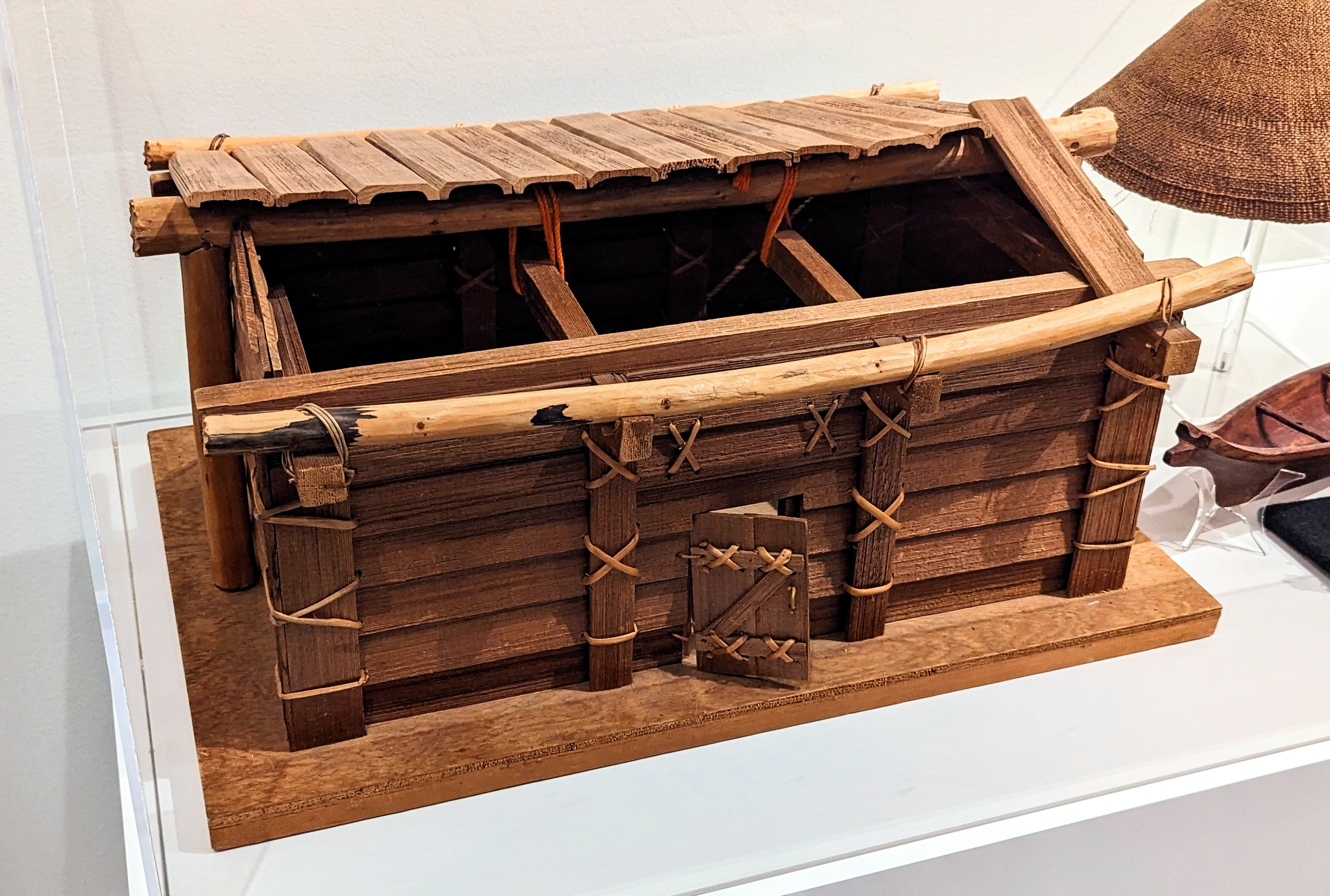
Model of a gable-roof longhouse

=== Architecture ===
The main dwelling of the Snohomish was the winter longhouse. Longhouses were often between one-hundred to two-hundred feet long. The Snohomish had two types of longhouses as identified by their roof shape: the slanted shed-roof houses and the triangular gable-roof houses. Longhouses were constructed out of long cedar planks tied to vertical posts for support. Houses were divided into rooms for each family. Inside the longhouse, the house posts were carved and painted by the oldest member of the family, and cattail mats were hung over the walls for insulation and storage. Two rows of sleeping platforms were around the wall, and above them were located storage shelves where provisions, blankets, and other belongings were stored. Fireplaces were never in the center of the house, but rather were located around the sides to allow for easy passage throughout the entire house. A replica of a traditional shed-roof longhouse was constructed at the Hibulb Cultural Center for gatherings and storytelling. The Gathering Hall at Tulalip Bay is inspired by the design of a traditional gable-roof longhouse.

Longhouses were owned by those who built it, with many longhouses being owned by the whole community. In larger longhouses with partitions, each room would be owned by one or several families. Other longhouses were owned by just one man and his family, all living in the longhouse.

The potlatch house was a special type of longhouse that wealthier communities could afford. Although any longhouse could be used for potlatches, large and wealthy communities often elected to build special longhouses exclusively for potlatching. Such houses were constructed in a similar fashion to normal houses, but had generally no partitions inside. The largest Snohomish potlatch house was located at dxʷlilap. A large shed-roof house, it was 115 feet long and 43 feet wide, with ten carved house posts.

The Snohomish also built smaller, temporary summer lodgings. They were square shaped, either like a lean-to or with a gabled roof. It was constructed of a frame with large mats stacked on top of each other and overlapped to be waterproof to form the roof and walls. Generally, only one family at a time occupied a summer house.

=== Sustenance ===
Food was always abundant on Puget Sound before colonization, and the traditional diet of the Snohomish was well-rounded. The Snohomish took steelhead, dog, pink, sockeye, and king salmon, as well as trout, sturgeon, and flounder, on the lakes, rivers, and saltwater. Many types of shellfish such as clams, cockles, and mussels were gathered on the coast. Bear, deer, beaver, elk, goat, and duck, and goose were all hunted in the surrounding forests. Fish was mainly dried, while meat was both smoked and dried.

Fishing is highly important to the Snohomish, and there are many traditional techniques used to catch many types of fish, both in rivers and on the saltwater. The most famous method of fishing on the river is with weirs (Lushootseed: stqalikʷ). Weirs were built over a river so that one could walk on the platform and lower a dip-net (luk̓ʷ) down into the trapped fish. Traps, hooks, and spears were used as well. Flare fishing, using flares made of pine chips, was done on rivers at night.

Plant resources were also widely used. Roots and berries, as well as certain native vegetables were gathered in the prairies, forests, and marshes. Berries, especially blackberries, were dried and made into cakes for dessert, or for future use. Flour and potatoes were also added to the diet, obtained through trade with settlers.

The Snohomish domesticated and kept the native Salish Wool Dog (sqix̌aʔ), which were sheared for their wool. The wool was highly valuable and could be made into clothing and blankets. According to ethnologist Colin Tweddell, the Snohomish were the center of the woolly-dog craft among the Coast Salish. The Snohomish also made blankets out of feathers and fireweed, as well as from high-quality mountain goat wool caught high in the Cascade Mountains.

=== Trade and transportation ===
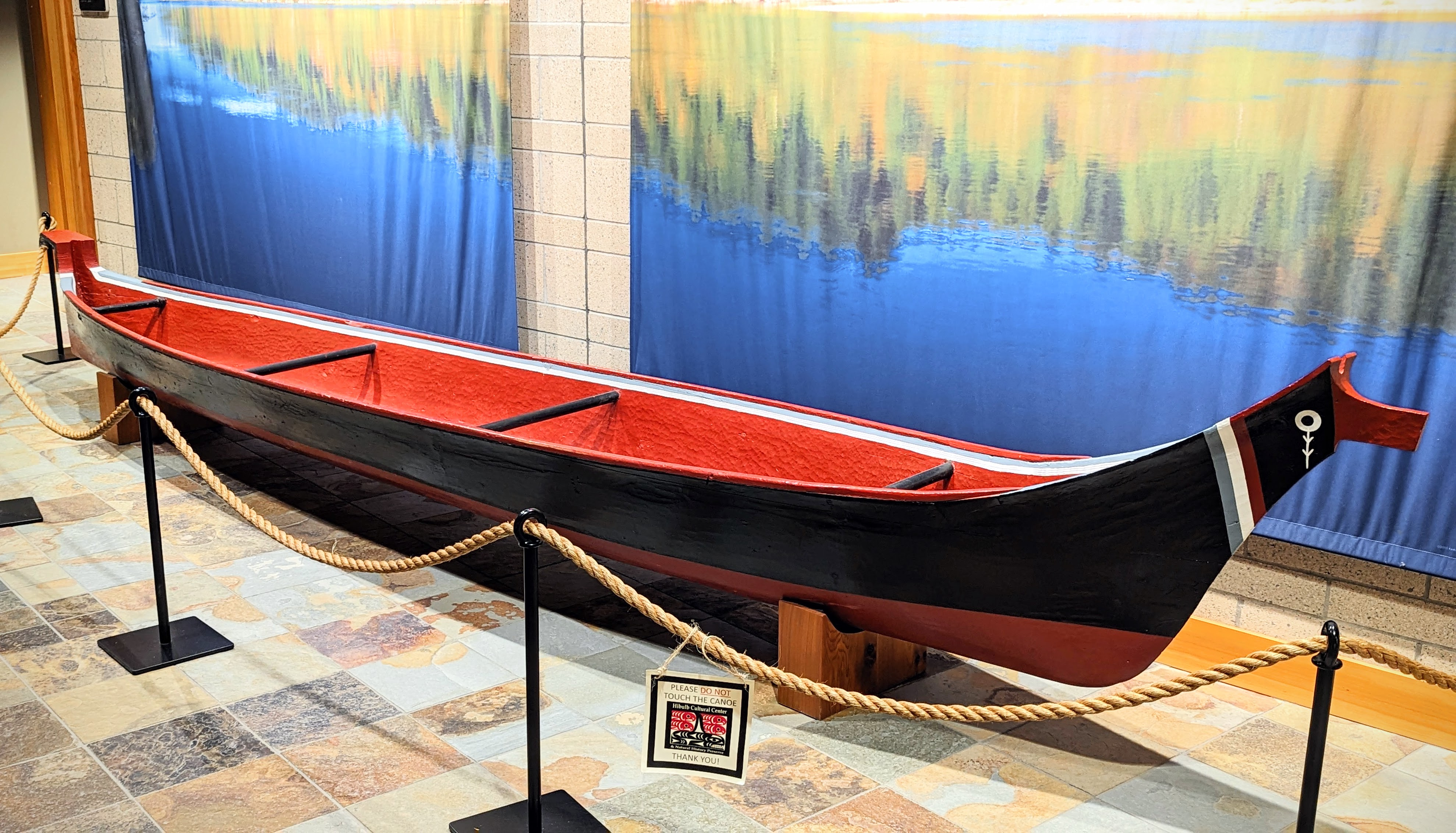
A river canoe (sdəxʷiɬ) carved by William Shelton in 1880

The Snohomish were central in the trade of mountain goat wool and dog wool to many saltwater groups which had limited access to such resources. The Snohomish sold large quantities of mountain goat wool and blankets to the Indigenous peoples of Vancouver Island, in particular.

A common currency used by the Snohomish was shell money, called dentalium or solax. While many tribes had to trade for shells, the Snohomish were able to gather some types in their own territory, although certain shells did have to be traded. Shells were strung together with a string, and some high-class people wore shells as jewelry, on the end of a necklace or as earrings.

The canoe was the primary method of transportation in historic times. Even today, they are widely used in cultural contexts. Traditionally, the Snohomish utilized five types of canoes. The largest kind was the Quinault-style canoe, an ocean-going canoe manufactured by the Quinault, who traded it to the Snohomish. It could hold as many as 60 people. The smaller Nootka-style canoe (ʔəʔutx̌s), also called the war canoe or Chinook canoe, was a saltwater canoe originally from the Makah, but was widely adopted by the Snohomish for traveling. The Snohomish painted this canoe black on the outside, and red on the inside. It could carry as many as fifteen people. A smaller variant of this canoe, the stiwatɬ, was made for women and hauling trade goods. The Nootka-style canoe replaced a similar type of canoe, the qəbuɬ, which was manufactured natively by the Snohomish. The Snohomish used two types of canoes for river travel, the river canoe and the shovel-nose canoe. The river canoe (sdəxʷiɬ) was the smallest of the two, usually built for two people, and was made to look like the larger canoes. It was used most commonly for duck hunting and fishing. The more common shovel-nose canoe (ƛ̕əlayʔ) was used widely by the Snohomish for quick river travel and for fishing.

=== Traditional clothing and appearance ===
In the summer, Snohomish men generally wore long pants made of buckskin, fastened with a belt made also of buckskin or otter skin. Men wore shirts with or without sleeves which were trimmed with otter skin. Women wore long cedar-bark skirts and long-sleeved shirts made of buckskin. Women also used cedar-bark capes to shield themselves from the rain. Both men and women wore capes of bearskin or sealskin, fastened with pins of bone or yew, and both men and women wore moccasins or went barefoot. Both men and women wore cedar basket hats, which were secured with buckskin chin straps. In the winter, men wore warm racoon-skin hats with fur.

Snohomish women wore their hair parted down the middle and hung lose on each side, covering the ear. Below the ear it was braided. Men wore their hair parted down the middle and tied in a knot at the neck. When at work or at war, men tied their hair in a bun at the top of their head, which was decorated with shell money. High-class men decorated their hair for ceremonies, braiding otter skin into the hair and painting it red. Very young children wore their hair loose. A slave's hair was cut short.

Both men and women painted their faces with red paint to prevent chapping and to keep the skin cool during summer. Paint was sometimes in decorative designs representing one's spirit powers. Women also tattooed their arms and legs, but there was no religious significance.

== Society ==
=== Sociopolitical organization ===
The highest level of regular political organization was traditionally that of the village. The extended family was one of the most important parts of the fabric of traditional Snohomish society. The extended family was made up of several related families who lived in the same house, divided into sections for each family. Some large houses fit multiple extended families. Families made a complex web of alliances through marriage, which secured hunting, fishing, and gathering rights at preferable locations.

Like other Puget Sound tribes, the Snohomish traditionally did not have chiefs. Rather, there were high-ranking nobles who guided village affairs and resolved disputes, however, they did not have executive authority over anyone. In specific scenarios, like hunting parties or war parties, specific leaders could be appointed who had a higher level of authority during that activity. War leaders had high amounts of authority over warriors, but no one else, and still listened to other high-ranking people for counsel. In matters of law and justice, parties sent orators who decided on appropriate payment to settle the dispute. A dispute left unsettled could lead to war. A common show of friendship after a dispute would have two tribes cut up blankets together and weave the other people's blanket wool into the tribe's own blankets.

Later, after the contact period, Snohomish society began to shift into a more hierarchical system. A system evolved where one chief at hibulb who led all the Snohomish villages and governed with the help of various subchiefs. The role was generally hereditary. Despite this, the chief did not have absolute authority, and matters were decided by majority vote at council. One such chief in this era was William Shelton, who was the last hereditary chief of the Snohomish before the eventual abolition of the hereditary chiefdom.

Today, the Snohomish are part of the Tulalip Tribes, which have their own governmental systems.

Traditionally, Snohomish society was made up of a class system composed of three classes: high-class (siʔab), low-class (p̓aƛ̕aƛ̕), and slaves (studəq). Slaves were prisoners of war, and, although they could not legally gain their freedom by themselves, it was possible (although uncommon) for the children of a slave to gain their freedom through a beneficial marriage. Otherwise, the children of an enslaved person were also to be slaves. Sometimes, a slave's family might buy them freedom if they could afford it. Enslaved children participated in the religious life as did other children, and those that got powerful spirit powers as they grew up were respected and treated as equals by their masters. The Snohomish never killed their slaves ritually or as punishment, unlike other Puget Sound peoples.

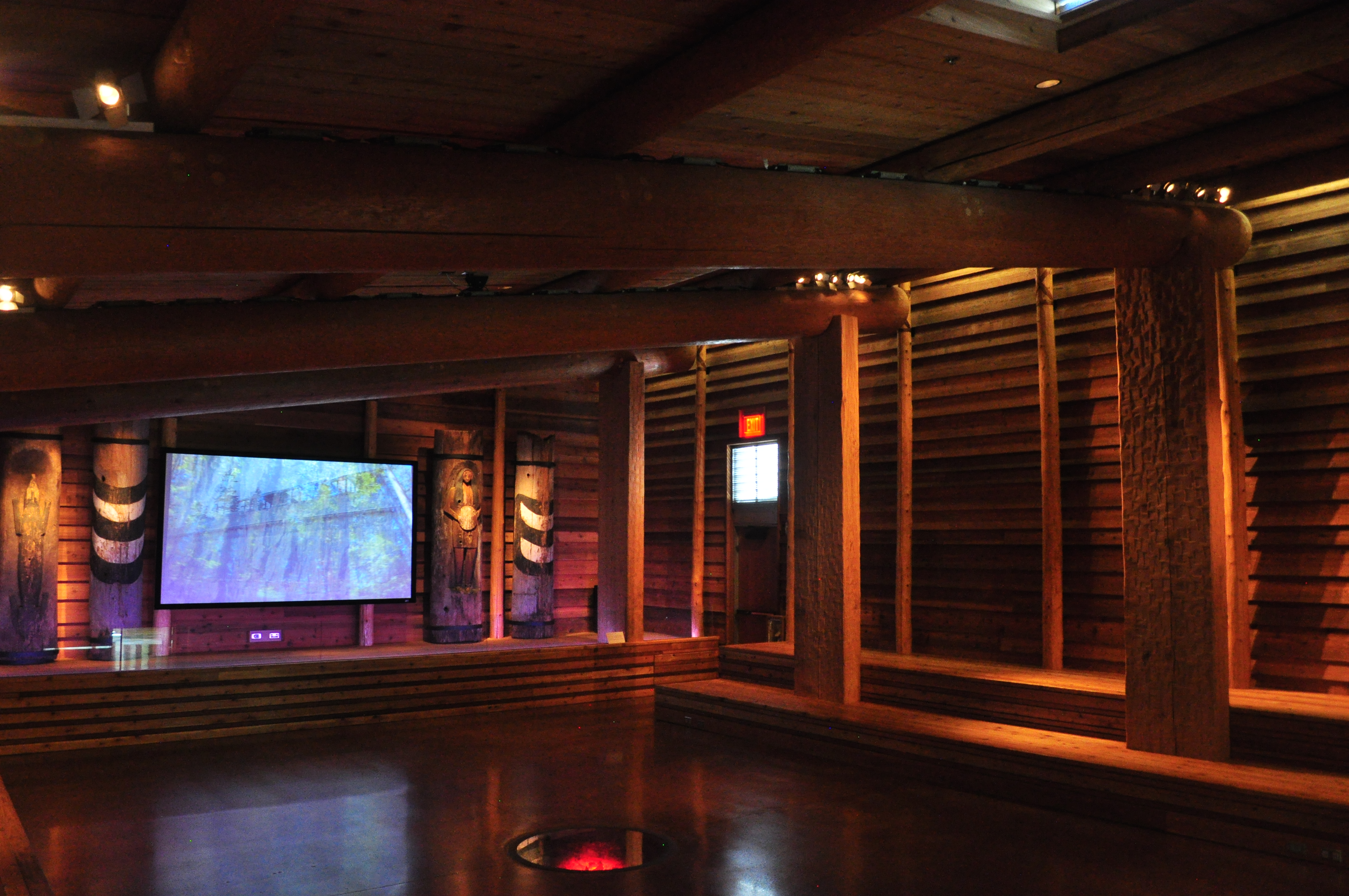
A room modeled after a traditional shed-roof longhouse at the Hibulb Cultural Center. Original carved house posts are at the back.

=== Potlatch ===
Potlatches (sgʷigʷi) are large intra-tribal gatherings which have long been practiced by the Snohomish and other neighboring Coast Salish peoples. The potlatch was the foundation of the economy prior to colonization, and today remains a very important cultural element of the Snohomish people. Traditional potlatches were essentially feasts for the purposes of gift-giving. Potlatches were held for many reasons, including (but not limited to) for a naming ceremony, for a funeral, after a successful hunt, for a marriage, for settlement of a debt or quarrel, or for celebrating a salmon run. Throwing an extravagant potlatch by giving away essentially all of one's possessions was highly respected and made someone widely famous. Traditionally, the potlatch cycle was used to strengthen alliances and relationships with nearby peoples. The potlatch cycle was also shared by the various villages of the Snohomish, solidifying their own inter-village connections. Among the Snohomish, the main potlatch houses were at hibulb, səxʷtəqad, dəgʷasx̌, and č̓əč̓ɬqs. Other villages had potlatch houses as well, including at šəƛ̕šəƛ̕šɬ, č̓ƛ̕aʔqs, dxʷlilap, and qʷəl̕sidəʔ. It is likely that there were more potlatch houses before the population decline due to smallpox. Certain houses were built during the early colonial period, such as the potlatch house at šəƛ̕šəƛ̕šɬ.

A traditional potlatch generally saw the invitation of hundreds of people from local villages as well as distant villages. A traditional potlatch had an extensive welcome ceremony, in which each arriving group had its own day for welcome. When they arrived, they were greeted by a dance, to which the arriving group would respond with a song. After the welcome ceremonies for all groups, there would be feasting, dancing, and singing. Distribution of gifts (i.e. "potlatching") was common, but did not (and do not) happen at every potlatch. Potlatches also traditionally included long speeches by famous orators, who were given gifts for their speeches. People displayed their spirit powers by singing power songs or by performing tricks.

=== Yearly cycle ===
Although the Snohomish had permanent lodgings, they were only semi-sedentary. The traditional Snohomish lifestyle involved a year-long cycle of hunting, fishing, and gathering, all across their territory and beyond. Some remained at their villages year-round, especially the sick and elderly, but most people participated in the seasonal gathering cycle each year. One of the factors in the unity of the various Snohomish villages was the common participation in the yearly cycle in the same areas. The cycle began in spring, as people began to gather salmonberries in the lowlands of the Cascades. By summer, people traveled widely throughout the territory for hunting, fishing, berrying, clamming, and gathering all around the islands and the coastline of the Sound. Some also traveled into Stevens Pass to berry during the later months of the summer season. Around August, people would travel inland to hunt elk and prepare for the salmon runs. In the early fall, salmon began running throughout Snohomish territory, and upriver fishing commenced. Hunters also widened their focus to deer, bear, beaver, and other animals during this time. In the late fall, as people returned to their villages for the winter, people would travel far upriver into Skykomish territory to hunt mountain goats in the Cascades. The winter was a time of religious ceremony as well as craftwork and building until the spring, with fishing for steelhead taking place in January.

In modern times, as more people began to be employed in hop fields, the summer months became a time of traveling to the fields to work before heading home for the winter.

== Language ==
The language of the Snohomish is Lushootseed, a Coast Salish language spoken by many different peoples throughout Puget Sound. Lushootseed is split into two main dialect areas, Northern, and Southern, each of which is split into various subdialects.The Snohomish dialect (also called the Tulalip dialect today) is a subdialect of Northern Lushootseed which has characteristics of both Northern and Southern Lushootseed, due to its location on the border between the two main dialects. Although usage of the language has declined in favor of English, the Tulalip Tribes work towards revitalizing the language to daily use and promoting traditional cultural knowledge called x̌əč̓usadad. The Tribes offer Lushootseed language classes in local schools, and also have held Catholic Mass in the language.

== Successor tribes ==
=== Tulalip Tribes of Washington ===
Most Snohomish are now enrolled in the federally-recognized Tulalip Tribes of Washington. The Tulalip Tribes is successor-in-interest to several groups, including (but not limited to) the Snohomish, Skykomish, and the Snoqualmie. The Snoqualmie are also represented by the Snoqualmie Indian Tribe, which fought for and subsequently won federal recognition for themselves, and are also as the successor-in-interest to the aboriginal Snoqualmie peoples.

The Tulalip Tribes operate two casinos, Quil Ceda Creek Casino and the Tulalip Resort Casino. The Tulalip Tribes also administrate the only tribal municipality in the country, Quil Ceda Village (Lushootseed: qʷəl̕sidəʔ ʔalʔaltəd), and operate the Hibulb Cultural Center, a cultural center and museum. They also have several schools within Marysville School District, as well as a Montessori school and several early childhood education and other welfare and education programs for children and adults. In 2006, the Tribes employed 2,400 people in total. Each year, the Tulalip Tribes participate in the Tribal Canoe Journey, an intra-tribal culture event held across Oregon, Washington, and British Columbia. In 2003, the Tulalip Tribes were the host nation. They celebrate Treaty Day on the weekend nearest January 22, and hold powwows and traditional celebrations throughout the year. The Tulalip Tribes also have Smokehouse religion facilities.

The Tulalip Reservation, established for the Snohomish and other groups (including those waiting for previously promised reservations) by the Treaty of Point Elliot, is west of the city of Marysville, is located on traditional Snohomish territory. However, most enrolled members today live off the reservation.

=== Snohomish Tribe of Indians ===
Some Snohomish descendants are members of the Snohomish Tribe of Indians or Snohomish Indian Tribe, commonly referred to as the Snohomish Tribe. The Snohomish Tribe is an unrecognized heritage group which claims descent from five aboriginal peoples: the Snohomish, the Sdodohobsh, the N'Quentlmamish, the Skykomish, and the Sktalejum. It was incorporated in 1974, and has sought federal recognition and a reservation between Snohomish and Monroe. In 2004, they were denied federal recognition by the Office of Federal Acknowledgement (OFA), and they appealed the decision in 2008. According to OFA, while some members do have documented Native ancestry, many are descended from various non-Snohomish Indian tribes. They hold an annual powwow on Marrowstone Island, near Port Townsend. There were approximately 1,200 members of the group in 2008, although it is unknown what percentage are Snohomish descent.

== Notable Snohomish ==
- Boeda Strand, basket weaver
- William Shelton, chief
- Tommy Yarr, former NFL player and Notre Dame Fighting Irish football captain
