= Julia Jacobs =

Matriarch of the Suquamish tribe (1874-1962)

Julia Jacobs (1874–1962) was a matriarch and culture bearer of the Suquamish Tribe. She is known for having preserved and passed on traditional Squamish arts.

== Biography ==
Julia Jacobs was born in 1874 on a Portuguese ship in Port Madison Mill to an enslaved woman. Her mother died during childbirth, and her father was unable to keep her. She was presumed to be of mixed African and Portuguese descent. Chief Jacob Wahalchu, the last chief of the Suquamish tribe, and his wife, Mary, adopted Julia. She grew up in a cedar plank longhouse called Old Man House. Mary taught Julia how to weave baskets, connecting her to the thousands of years old tradition.

Jacobs's adopted parents taught her tribal traditions, Lushootseed (the language of many Puget Sound tribes). Jacobs attended Tulalip Indian Boarding School, where she was unable to practice Suquamish traditions. Jacobs was an expert basket weaver. She was the last person to weave the specialized clam gathering basket.

Jacobs had three children, Agatha Henry, Lawrence Webster, and Edith Alexis. Webster became the first chairman of the Suquamish Tribe and co-founder of the Suquamish Museum. Jacobs's grandchildren and great-grandchildren recalled her passing on knowledge of weaving and carving. She raised her great-grandson Ed Carriere and taught him basketweaving. Carriere is a renowned weaver and authority on Coast Salish textiles.

Jacobs died in 1962. She was buried in Suquamish, next to her adoptive parents.

== Legacy ==
In 2022, the Suquamish Tribe honored Julia Jacobs as a tribal matriarch in their Proclamation for Black History Month. Her family's story introduced the exhibit "IndiVisible: African-Native American Lives in the Americas" at the Northwest African American Museum.
