= Chief Kitsap Academy =

Tribal school in Suquamish, Washington

Coordinates: 47°42′38″N 122°36′13″W

Chief Kitsap Academy (CKA) is a grade 6-12 school in Suquamish, in unincorporated Kitsap County, Washington, with a Poulsbo postal address. The Suquamish Tribe Department of Education operates the school. The school is on a 27 acres (11 ha) parcel.

Prior to 2014 the school serving the Suquamish people was operated by the North Kitsap School District. In August 2014 the tribe signed a compact with the State of Washington to directly operate the school, with the state providing funding, the first instance of such in the state. In 2014 the school had 78 students and seven full-time teachers. The now-independent school previously occupied the ex-tribal center. It moved to its current campus, the former Northwest College of Art & Design, in 2018. The tribe had purchased the building for $5.03 million on November 28, 2017. The facility is the former Mains Manor.

== Curriculum ==
The school teaches the culture of the Suquamish people and the Suquamish language, Lushootseed.
