= George Anson Meigs =

George Anson Meigs (February 4, 1816 – March 3, 1897) was a prominent entrepreneur, businessman and shipbuilder in Washington Territory.

Meigs was born in Shelburne, Vermont. He was the eighth child of Whiting Meigs and Charlotte (Grennell) Meigs. He received his common school education there and then ventured to Newark, New Jersey, Brooklyn, New York, Key West, Florida, Memphis, Tennessee, and New Orleans, Louisiana. He ultimately went to California during the gold rush of 1849, where he opened a lumber business in San Francisco.

In 1854, Meigs purchased a lumber mill from J.J. Felt who had moved it from Appletree Cove, near the present city of Kingston, Washington, to a new location at Port Madison, on Bainbridge Island. The mill was located near the Suquamish longhouse Old Man House, and many workers in the mill were Natives.

Port Madison was founded by Meigs. Meigs enlarged and improved the mill and spent most of his time there, leaving the lumber yard in San Francisco to William H. Gawley. By 1858, Meigs had developed a capacity at the mill of 15,000 board feet (35 m^{3}) per day and it soon ranked with the principal lumber producing plants on Puget Sound. In addition to the lumber mill, Meigs established a dairy farm near the middle of Bainbridge Island.

In 1858, Meigs married Mary Elizabeth Tappan in Boston. The couple had two children, Lillie Charlotte and George Elroy.

Meigs later built the first brass and iron foundry in Washington Territory and a shipyard. From his shipyard came the first full-rigged sailing ship ever built on the Pacific Coast, the Wildwood. Although there was an abundant supply of timber on the coast, the Pacific shipbuilding industry had been held back by the fact that Douglas fir, the principal timber source, was found to decay rapidly. Not until it was discovered that Douglas fir was durable if cut in the winter, seasoned and salted was any attempt made to construct ships of it. The Wildwood, at 1099 tons, was the first.

Meigs assisted in the construction of the University of Washington and served as one of its regents during the early 1860s.

On February 18, 1861, a boiler explosion made a wreck of Meigs's Puget Sound mill. Five men were killed, and the cost of rebuilding just about broke Meigs. In 1864, the mill burned once more and the loss was put at $100,000. Again, Meigs rebuilt and enlarged the mill's capacity. During the first six months of 1870, running day and night, the mill cut and shipped 11,872,000 board feet (28,010 m^{3}) of lumber. Meigs's fleet of ships had also expanded to 45,000 tons, including the Northern and Tidal Wave.

Meigs weathered business depressions and other problems, including his partner William H. Gawley's, speculation with funds taken from the company. Finally, by 1881, financial and legal difficulties could not be overcome and the mill complex on Bainbridge Island was sold at a sheriff's auction. Meigs spent the last years of life on his property at Port Madison.

On March 3, 1897, Meigs had gone to testify in a libel action in Seattle. On his way back to the ship, which was to leave that night for Port Madison, Meigs disappeared. His body was found the next morning on the deck of a freighter. The coroner's jury held that Meigs had gotten lost in the dark and his death was accidental.
