= House of Awakened Culture =

Coordinates: 47°43′45″N 122°33′10″W

- sgwәdzadad qәɫ ʔaltxw

General information
- Location: Suquamish, Washington U.S.
- Opened: February 28, 2009
- Owner: Suquamish Tribe

Technical details
- Floor area: 13,169 sq ft

Design and construction
- Architect(s): Mithun

The House of Awakened Culture (Lushootseed: sgwәdzadad qәɫ ʔaltxw) is a community house in Suquamish, Washington State, on the Port Madison Indian Reservation. Built by the Suquamish tribe in 2008, it acts as a spiritual successor to the historic Old Man House, which was burnt by the local Indian agent in 1870 in an attempt to disperse the tribe. Since its opening in 2009, the house has served as a community center for the Suquamish tribe and the community.

== History ==
The Suquamish Tribe historically had a longhouse on the shore of the Puget Sound named Old Man House. While it is not clear when the building was first constructed, the site where it stood had acted as the Suquamish tribe's "mother village" for at least 2,000 years. In 1870, possibly in an attempt to force the tribe's dispersal and accelerate assimilation, the building was burnt to the ground by the local Indian agent. The tribe retained ownership of the land until 1904, when it was sold to the U.S. Army. The Washington State Parks and Recreation Commission operated the site as a state park from 1950 to 2004, when the land was transferred back to the tribe.

Also in 2004, the Suquamish Tribal Council began exploring the possibility of building a community center for the tribe to host traditional events. In 2006, the Suquamish tribe began a capital campaign to fund the development of culturally significant projects, including the Suquamish Museum, a memorial to Chief Seattle, and the House of Awakened Culture. The house was designed by Mithun, a Seattle-based architecture firm, and construction began in mid-2008.

The house was dedicated and named on February 28, 2009, in a ceremony bringing together over 400 visitors from across the United States and Canada. It opened to the public in a second ceremony on March 10. During the ceremony's opening prayer, a tribal elder declared that "It's been a long, long time since we've had a home to call our own. It's the dreams of our ancestors, our people to have our own place to be who we were meant to be."

Shortly after the house's official opening on February 28, 2009, it hosted the end of the 2009 Tribal Canoe Journey. Over a six-day period, nearly 10,000 indigenous people from around the world traveled to the house for a celebration of native culture. Since then, the house has continued to act as a community hub for the Suquamish tribe. Some community members, including former Tribal Council presidents and Stonechild Chiefstick, are memorialized there.

== Architecture ==
The building is long and concave, consisting of a main hall, accompanying canoe shed, and garden area. A total of 13,169 square feet (1,223 m^{2}), the house is primarily constructed out of red cedar and other woods native to the Kitsap Peninsula. The auditorium of the building features large house posts displaying various Suquamish teachings. The posts, which weigh between 800 and 1,500 pounds (360–680 kg), were installed using a pulley system and teams of 30 workers.

Comparing the House of Awakened Culture to traditional longhouses, Lauren Rieke described it as fitting into a larger trend of tribes asserting their culture, writing that the longhouse "exemplifies the contemporary culture of the Suquamish, while at the same time providing a tangible link to their past traditions." Rieke noted that unlike more traditional longhouses, the House of Awakened Culture has large double doors and horizontal siding rather than vertical.
