= Kitsap (Suquamish leader) =

19th-century leader of the Suquamish people

- k̓c̓ap
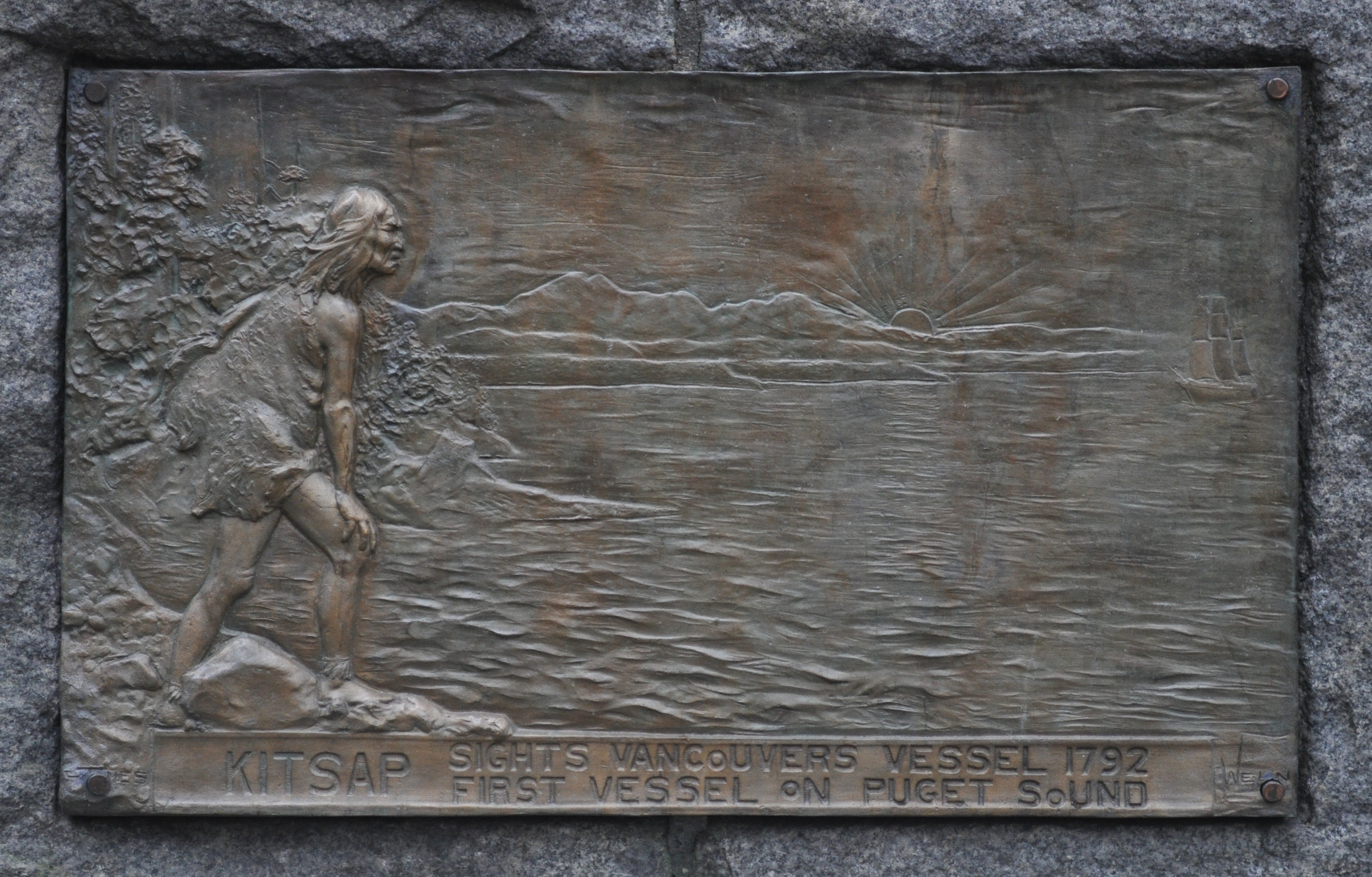
- A plaque of Kitsap sighting the Vancouver Expedition c. 1792

Suquamish war leader

Personal details
- Cause of death: Murder
- Relations: Telibut (brother); Schweabe (brother); Seattle (nephew)
- Known for: Warfare, wealth
- Mother tongue: Lushootseed

Kitsap (Lushootseed: k̓c̓ap; (Note: Also pronounced kcap) fl. c. 1791 – c. 1829) was a leader of the Suquamish people during the 19th century. Kitsap was the orchestrator of a region-wide coalition that sought to end the constant slave raids perpetrated by the Cowichan. His wealth and prestige allowed him to build the Old Man House, one of the most famous longhouses on Puget Sound. Kitsap, who met one of the first European expeditions into Puget Sound, was quick to ally with European traders, and set a precedent for Suquamish attitudes toward white settlers in the future.

Kitsap was famed for his prowess, military strategy, wealth, and medicine powers, and is remembered by the Suquamish both for his military achievements, and his violent nature, which made him many enemies. His military campaigns influenced Seattle, his nephew. His contemporary, pioneer Theodore O. William said that Kitsap was the most powerful chief on Puget Sound from 1790 to 1845. Kitsap County, Washington, and the Kitsap Peninsula are named for him.

== Life ==
=== Early life ===
Kitsap was born to a Skopamish (Lushootseed: sxʷq̓ʷupabš) man of Yakama ancestry, who had married into the Suquamish, giving him strong ties to the Green River people. Kitsap was related to Schweabe, the father of Seattle. Kitsap lived in a longhouse on Bainbridge Island, located west of Restoration Point on Rich Passage.

The name Kitsap was relatively common among the Suquamish.

=== Rise to prominence ===
Kitsap allegedly foretold the arrival of Europeans around a year before HMS Discovery would come to Puget Sound. It is said that Kitsap, holding a trade bead, announced that the people who were the origin of the beads would come to visit soon. George Vancouver would eventually stop by a Suquamish encampment on May 20, 1792, where they engaged with the local Suquamish. Two Suquamish men, one of whom was likely Kitsap, led a welcoming procession in canoes, and they eventually were invited to board the Discovery. The men were shown various goods and trinkets, including molasses, which Kitsap tried to use to plug cracks in his canoe (only for the molasses to dissolve in the water).

Kitsap was known for his leadership during warfare, but he disliked the usual practice of decapitating one's enemies and displaying the head. Rather, he called the practice "showing off", which would later influence Seattle in his own war campaigns.

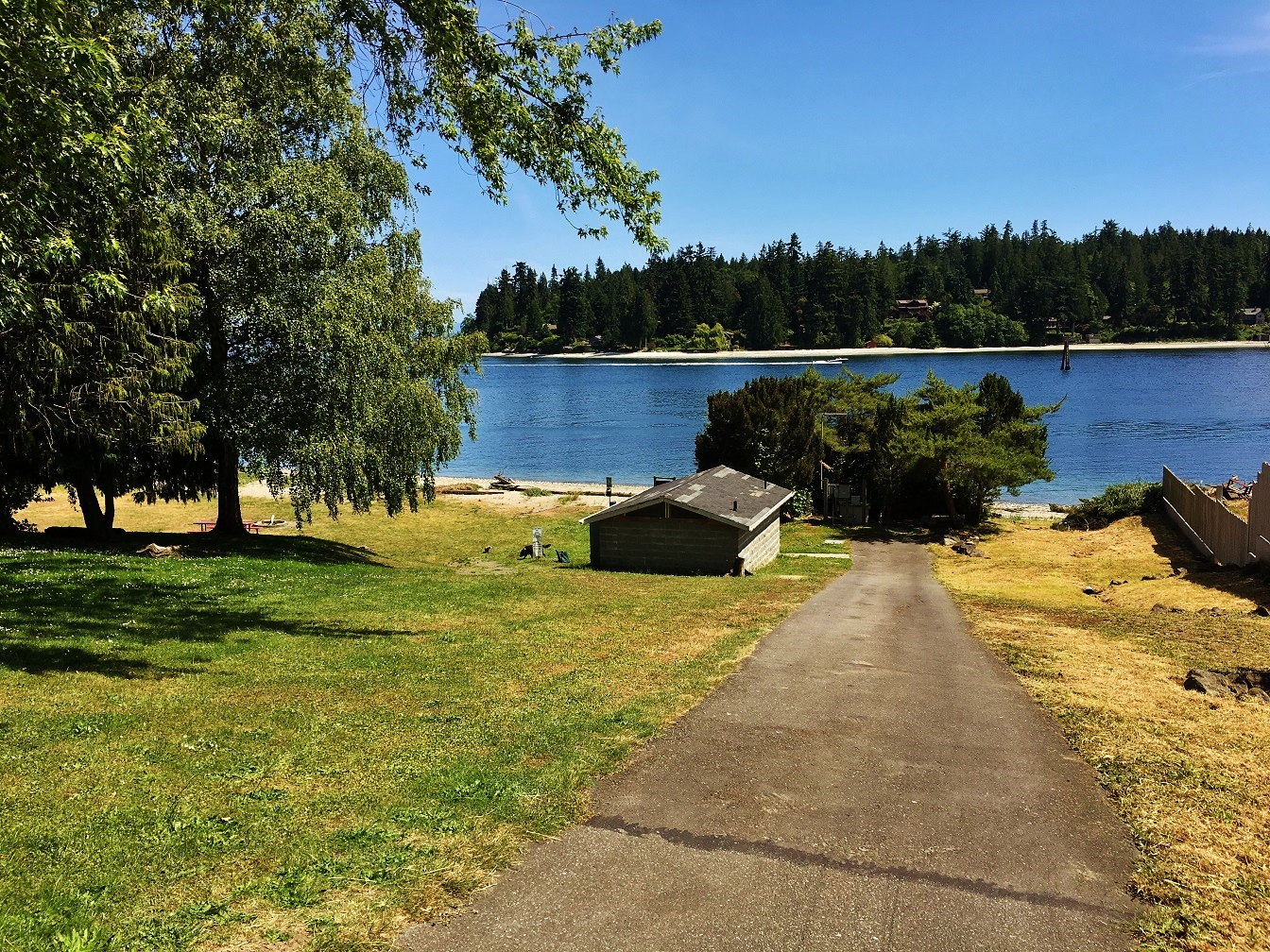
The site of the Old Man Longhouse

Sometime around the turn of the 18th century, the Old Man House was built at dxʷsəq̓ʷəb, on Agate Pass. According to some informants in 1855, it was a brother of Seattle who built it. In the early 20th century, Suquamish informants reported that Kitsap was the creator of the famed longhouse. One of Seattle's grandsons, Sam Wilson, said that Kitsap was inspired to build the Old Man House by a dream where he and the Suquamish could greet the Europeans when they returned. To build the house, a cattail swamp at Agate Pass was cleared and a swath of land was excavated. Men cut down great cedar trees to fashion the rafters and planks. Kitsap invited workers from across Puget Sound, as far south as the Cowlitz people, holding competitions to raise the massive logs into place. In total, the project took four years. Kitsap lived in a central section of the longhouse, painted red and black. His "apartment" was flanked by two carved images: one of a man with muskets and another of a man with a top hat and frock coat, possibly deriving from his memories of Vancouver's crew. Above the longhouse was the carved image of a thunderbird, which may have represented his spirit power, tubšədəd. It may also have been associated with the creation story of Agate Pass, in which an eagle and a serpent widened a narrow channel into the broad passageway during a battle. Allegedly, Kitsap made one of the petroglyphs on x̌alilc, a glacial erratic associated with the Old Man House.

By 1815, Kitsap was middle-aged, and was described to be a "tall, broad and thick man" and a "ruthless, domineering leader who killed his own uncle". His ancestry, as well as the ownership of the Old Man House and the older longhouse on Rich Passage, showed that he was wealthy, and his strength was also famous. According to tradition, he was able to stand in a canoe off Point Defiance (Lushootseed: sč̓itus) and shoot an arrow more than 200 feet (61 m) up and over the cliffs.

=== Fight against the Cowichans ===
In 1821, Scottish trader James McMillan led an expedition through Puget Sound. Circa December 7–8, they landed at a Suquamish village, seeking to speak with a known chief, possibly Kitsap, but encountered few people. The rest had fled, expecting the party to be a raiding party of Cowichan people, whose slave raids terrorized much of the region in the early 1800s. Kitsap wanted to create an alliance to defend against the Cowichans of Vancouver Island, and envisioned a coalition stretching from the Columbia River to Puget Sound, with the Old Man House at the center. His relative, Schweabe, led efforts to produce canoes, while Schweabe's son, Seattle, may have intimidated other tribes into joining the coalition by taking hostages.

The first attack came around 1825, according to the account of William Fraser Tolmie, with Kitsap and the Suquamish leading the coalition. (Note: Seattle's contemporary and pioneer Samuel F. Coombs reported that Seattle was the head chief of this alliance) Contingents from the Stkamish, Sammamish, Puyallup, Nisqually, Squaxin, Chehalis, Cowlitz, and more joined the Suquamish in the attack in more than two hundred war canoes. On the way north, the coalition raided Snohomish and Skagit encampments for supplies before continuing past the San Juan Islands. After crossing Haro Strait to Vancouver Island, they arrived near Victoria Harbor, where they attacked Cowichan camps, finding all men gone, with only women, children and elderly men. After killing the elderly men, they took the women and children prisoner, in retaliation for the women and children stolen and killed by the Cowichan. They attacked a Tsou-ke village, taking prisoners. The leader of the village warned them that the Cowichan and Saanich raiders were travelling to attack the S'Klallam that very day, and if they returned to see the Suquamish force, they would attack them and kill the prisoners. The Puget Sound fleet followed the Cowichan across the Strait of Juan de Fuca to Dungeness Spit. Through the fog, the Suquamish force heard the Cowichan celebrating a successful raid against the S'Klallam, their canoes filled with slaves and plunder. Surprised, the Cowichan and Saanich force attempted to parley, but Kitsap and the Suquamish force roused the warriors, singing power songs and executing their prisoners in front of the northern force. The Cowichan and Saanich sang as well, with a contemporary source reporting that the Cowichan executed the S'Klallam slaves that they had taken in the raid.

As the battle began, the Cowichan force retreated to draw the attacking Suquamish forwards. They rammed their great canoes into the smaller Puget Sound canoes and shot arrows into them, stabbing any who fell into the water. This quickly disintegrated the Suquamish fleet, who retreated into the open water. Kitsap and his brother Telibut survived, with Telibut allegedly being shot in the eye with an arrow only to rip it out and keep fighting. Kitsap himself returned arrow fire, picking up fallen arrows after his own ran out. Tales of the battle say that all arrows shot at him passed harmlessly through his hair. The battle lasted from around midday to around six o'clock, ending with only forty Suquamish canoes returning home. The Cowichan returned with "about the same number" as the Suquamish, according to the accounts of several who took part in the battle.

Despite being described by some sources as a disaster, the attack halted Cowichan raiding of Puget Sound, and established Kitsap as "the most powerful chief on Puget Sound". When Kitsap's oldest son visited Fort Langley to trade, he met with Shashia, a leader of the Cowichan, who put him under his protection. Furthermore, the Cowichan and Puget Sound groups began strengthening their ties. Seattle's first wife was Cowichan, and his daughter, Angeline, married a half-Cowichan man.

After the war, the Suquamish were strengthened in their confidence. Thirty Suquamish and a leader, likely Kitsap, visited the second James McMillan expedition on July 6, 1827, who were camping at Point Jefferson (Lushootseed: sqʷayupšəd). The Suquamish party brought trade goods, although McMillan felt threatened by their presence, worried that their newfound confidence may have led them to kill them and take their belongings.

=== Later life and the Puget Sound War ===
On June 29, 1829, Kitsap may have been the "old Indian" and chief of the Suquamish who met with a contingent of armed settlers led by one Alexander McLeod. McLeod was sent by the Hudson Bay Company (HBC) to retaliate against the S'Klallam for raiding HBC traders. The Suquamish offered to come with them, seeking to become allies with the HBC. Although the S'Klallam attempted to negotiate, the HBC ship Cadboro blasted the S'Klallam party sent to parley, and the McLeod party burned a longhouse at Port Townsend.

According to one Suquamish account, Kitsap tried to force himself upon a daughter of one of his slaves, and when she scratched him, he split her skull open with a rock. When Kitsap later died, some believed the girl's mother had sent killing power at him.

== Death ==
By the 1830s, Kitsap had disappeared from the historical record. Historian David Buerge believes that his absence suggests that he had died by this time. According to his grandson, William, Kitsap was murdered and his body was buried in a secret location. However, grave robbers from the Smithsonian Institution later found and stole his bones.

After his death, the S'Klallam carried out a raid on the Suquamish, killing several. The Suquamish wanted to carry out a raid in revenge, however, a new leader, Challacum, (Note: Also spelled Challicoom, Chilialucum, Chilialiucum, Shallicum, Zallicum, Tsalacom, Tsalcom, and Tsulucub.) stated that he did not want any more killing, intending to keep violence from once again erupting on the Sound, as had Kitsap.

== Legacy ==
Pioneer Theodore O. Williams called Kitsap "the greatest Indian warrior of the last century" and "the most powerful chief that ever the Indians of Puget Sound saw." Alternatively, 19th-century historian Elwood Evans posited that he was most revered for his abilities of healing serious wounds received in battle. Kitsap was also remembered for his violent personality, with his grandson, William Kitsap, stating that it brought him many enemies, eventually resulting in his murder. Despite this, he is more remembered by the Suquamish for his strategic vision and leadership, than his wealth and strength, and his ability to bring together an alliance to achieve "what none could have accomplished alone".

Kitsap's attempts to ally with white settlers would set a precedent for the politics of the Suquamish. Another leader of the Suquamish, Challacum, made good relations with the settlers, likely influenced by Kitsap's attempts. As the uncle of Seattle, he was also an influence in Seattle's life and war campaigns.

Kitsap Peninsula and Kitsap County are named after Kitsap, according to modern and contemporary historians. According to Evans, the county held an election to decide a new name for then-called Slaughter County. Kitsap was the name chosen, for "he was one of the most prominent of the chiefs" who resided in Port Madison, which was the county seat.

Other people were named "Kitsap". These include a Skopamish headman who fought with Leschi during the Puget Sound War, a Klickitat who killed Lt. William Alloway Slaughter (Note: Slaughter was the original namesake of Kitsap County before its renaming) during the Indian Wars, and one of Kitsap's descendants, Johnny Kitsap, who was also known as Chief Kitsap. Although it is impossible to be sure, Suquamish Tribe chairman Leonard Forsman believes that most people were aware that they were voting for Kitsap the Suquamish, rather than the Klickitat Kitsap who lived around the same time, when renaming Slaughter County into Kitsap County.
