= Port Madison =

Deep water bay in Puget Sound, Washington, U.S.

Coordinates: 47.725210°N 122.525797°W

Port Madison, sometimes called Port Madison Bay, is a deep water bay located on the west shore of Puget Sound in western Washington. It is bounded on the north by Indianola, on the west by Suquamish, and on the south by Bainbridge Island. Port Madison connects to Bainbridge Island via the Agate Pass Bridge to the southwest. Two small bays open off Port Madison: Miller Bay to the northwest, and another small bay to the south which, confusingly, is also called Port Madison Bay (or, locally, as the "Inner Harbor").

The inner harbor, which indents into Bainbridge Island is where the Port Madison Yacht Club and a Seattle Yacht Club outstation are located. The Port Madison Indian Reservation is located on the west and north shores of Port Madison.

According to various sources, the native name of the bay was either Tu-che-kup or Noo-sohk-um. On Nov. 8 1824, John Work of the Hudson's Bay Company, while looking for potential sites for a trading post, recorded it as Soquamis Bay - a variation on the name of the Suquamish tribe which made its home on the western shore. The Wilkes Expedition surveyed the bay on May 10, 1841 and named it for James Madison, the 4th president of the United States.

George A. Meigs built a lumber mill on the Bainbridge Island shore of the bay in 1854, and Port Madison was soon a booming mill town. The town of Port Madison became Kitsap County's first county seat, but after the economic depression of the 1890s closed the mill, the seat was relocated and Port Madison became a ghost town. Today, Port Madison is a residential area and a popular destination for boaters.
