= List of killings by law enforcement officers in the United States, December 2011 =

This is a list of people reported killed by non-military law enforcement officers in the United States in December 2011, whether in the line of duty or not, and regardless of reason or method. The listing documents the occurrence of a death, making no implications regarding wrongdoing or justification on the part of the person killed or officer involved. Killings are arranged by date of the incident that caused death. Different death dates, if known, are noted in the description. The table below lists 50 people.

== December 2011 ==
Date	Name (Age) of Deceased	Race	State (city)	Description
2011-12-31	Adrian Otero (19)	Hispanic/Latino	Arizona (Phoenix)	Otero was found unconscious behind the wheel of a car, blocking traffic. When police made contact, he allegedly pulled out a gun and was shot and killed by the officer.
2011-12-31	Vincent "Poochie" Owens (17)	Black	New Jersey (Newark)	Owens was killed in a shootout with police (and subsequent car crash) after attempting to carjack an off-duty officer.
2011-12-31	Kathy Porter (54)	White	Georgia (Atlanta)	An officer responding to a call ran a red light, striking another vehicle. Porter, an occupant of the other vehicle, was killed, and other occupants were injured.
2011-12-31	John Capano (51)	White	New York (Seaford)	Capano, a special agent with the Bureau of Alcohol, Tobacco, Firearms and Explosives, was shot in the chest by a retired officer while struggling with McGoey, who had just robbed a pharmacy where Capano was a customer. The officer had mistaken Capano for an armed assailant. McGoey was then shot and killed by an off-duty officer who came to the scene.
2011-12-31	James McGoey (43)	Unknown	New York (Seaford)	Capano, a special agent with the Bureau of Alcohol, Tobacco, Firearms and Explosives, was shot in the chest by a retired officer while struggling with McGoey, who had just robbed a pharmacy where Capano was a customer. The officer had mistaken Capano for an armed assailant. McGoey was then shot and killed by an off-duty officer who came to the scene.
2011-12-30	Dwayne M. Oxley (41)	White	New York (East Meadow)	
2011-12-30	Marvin Pognon (22)	Black	Florida (Miami Beach)	
2011-12-29	Nahcream Moore (19)	Black	New York (Albany)	
2011-12-29	Gary Lee Gahart (28)	White	California (Tulare)	Officers shot and killed Gahart after he kidnapped his girlfriend at gunpoint.
2011-12-29	Ronnie Pittman (54)	Black	Ohio (Cincinnati)	
2011-12-29	Mark Anthony Trujillo (23)	Hispanic/Latino	California (Perris)	
2011-12-29	Willie Ray Banks (52)	Black	Texas (Granite Shoals)	
2011-12-29	Kent Ashworth (49)	White	Utah (West Valley City)	
2011-12-28	Mario Marin (53)	White	California (Santa Ana)	
2011-12-28	Karaka Walls (24)	Black	Illinois (Chicago)	
2011-12-27	Joseph Cleary (22)	White	Florida (Cape Coral)	
2011-12-27	Ameen Davis (30)	Race unspecified	Pennsylvania (Philadelphia)	Police were called regarding shots being fired. Davis allegedly refused to put down his gun, and when he pointed it toward police, he was shot and killed.
2011-12-27	Cedric Darnell Stephens (29)	Black	Texas (Dallas)	Stephens was shot to death by a Dallas police officer in a residential area. Allegedly, Stephens had reached for a handgun.
2011-12-27	Robert Evan La Rue (48)	White	California (Rancho Palos Verdes)	Deputies responded to a call about a domestic disturbance. When the officials arrived, La Rue held up a knife, and they shot him to death.
2011-12-26	James Flores (44)	Race unspecified	California (Hemet)	
2011-12-26	Allan Shepherd (37)	White	Tennessee (Athens)	
2011-12-25	Christopher Bryan Johnston (29)	White	Texas (Fort Worth)	
2011-12-25	Blake Allen Pate (24)	White	Texas (Houston)	
2011-12-25	Brian Keith Naab (49)	White	Florida (Hudson)	
2011-12-25	Jacquelyn "Jameela" Cecila Barnette (53)	Black	Georgia (Marietta)	Shot after assaulting police officer with weapons.
2011-12-20	Michael Alan Thomas (47)	Race unspecified	Arizona (Mohave County)	
2011-12-20	Guillermo Cruz "Memo" Noriega (20)	Race unspecified	Colorado (Pueblo)	
2011-12-20	Anthony Lamar Smith (24)	Black	Missouri (St. Louis)	
2011-12-20	Wayne S. Lyall (39)	White	Virginia (Natural Bridge)	
2011-12-20	Dawntrae Ta'Shawn Williams (15)	Black	Georgia (Buford)	Shot after refusing commands to drop machete. Police were called to residence when the 15-year-old boy threatened to kill his family with the machete.
2011-12-19	Eli Franklin Myers III (58)	Race unspecified	Pennsylvania (Monessen)	
2011-12-19	Steven Ray Rickard (39)	White	Indiana (Evansville)	
2011-12-18	Keith Thompson (21)	White	Texas (Palo Pinto)	
2011-12-17	Robert John Montes (37)	Hispanic/Latino	New Mexico (Las Cruces)	
2011-12-17	Roberto Rodriguez (32)	Hispanic/Latino	California (Los Angeles)	
2011-12-14	Ariston Waiters (19)	Black	Georgia (Union City)	Shot during a physical altercation with police. Officers were responding to a report of a fight between teenage girls and young adults. Neighbors report that the man was not involved in the fight and when shot, the man was running from police to avoid arrest on outstanding warrants. Autopsy confirmed Waiters was shot in the back.
2011-12-12	Stanley LaVon Gibson (43)	Black	Nevada (Las Vegas)	Stanley Gibson was shot and killed by Metro Officer Jesus Arevalo as police responded to a burglary report. Gibson, a veteran, was allegedly suffering from PTSD and brain cancer and was disoriented when he struck a police cruiser with his car. Officers boxed him in with their vehicles, commanding Gibson to exit his vehicle as he continued to attempt to drive away. Police reportedly made a plan to break Gibson's window with a beanbag round and use pepper spray to force him out. When the beanbag round was fired, Arevalo fired seven rounds of live ammunition at Gibson, who was unarmed. In October 2012, the Clark County District Attorney's office announced an indictment against Arevalo and is seeking a grand jury hearing of the case. In May 2013, following an internal review, the Critical Incident Review Board recommended the termination of Arevalo's position with the Metro Police.
2011-12-09	David Christopher Lewis (34)	White	Florida (Milton)	
2011-12-08	Damien Jefferson Muncie (36)		Oklahoma (Oklahoma City)	Muncie was shot and killed after allegedly wounding three police officers and attempting to break into the Valley Brook Municipal Building.
2011-12-08	Thomas Anthony Black (44)	White	Washington (Suquamish)	Officers were serving an arrest warrant when they shot 44-year-old Black to death. Police retracted their original statement that Black had shot at officers after no handgun was recovered at the scene and no evidence supported Black's firing at them. Detectives said they did find a toy gun in the vicinity.
2011-12-07	David Pendleton (77)	White	Nevada (Gardnerville)	
2011-12-06	Byron Neftali Sosa Orellano (28)	Hispanic/Latino	Arizona	
2011-12-06	Jaleel Jackson (16)	Black	Missouri (St. Louis)	
2011-12-06	Aviles, Ricardo (30)		Florida (Miami-Dade)	
2011-12-05	Stephen Ray Malone Jr. (32)	White	Texas (Dallas)	Shot during enforcement action by Dallas Police on board Amtrak's Texas Eagle train.
2011-12-03	Fernando Benavides	Hispanic/Latino	Florida (Miami)	
2011-12-03	Vang Thao (21)	Asian/Pacific Islander	California (Merced)	Thao was killed by a stray bullet as officers fired at 18-year-old Kong Xiong, who was pointing a gun at them. Thao was not their intended target, and the Merced Police Department stated that Xiong was responsible for Thao's death.
2011-12-02	Shendon Chandler-Taniguchi (21)	Asian/Pacific Islander	Hawaii (Pakala Village)	
2011-12-02	Leslie Morin (31)	Hispanic/Latino	Texas (Corpus Christi)	
2011-12-01	Emiliano Amaya (39)	Hispanic/Latino	California (Los Angeles)	

== See also ==
- Death in custody § United States
- Henry A. Wallace Police Crime Public Database
- List of cases of police brutality
- List of countries with annual rates and counts for killings by law enforcement officers
- List of law enforcement officers killed in the line of duty in the United States
- List of law enforcement officers convicted for an on-duty killing in the United States
- List of shootings by US immigration agents
- List of police reforms related to the George Floyd protests
- List of unarmed African Americans killed by law enforcement officers in the United States
- Lists of killings by law enforcement officers
- Police brutality in the United States
- Police misconduct § United States
- Police riot § United States
- Police use of deadly force in the United States
