= Port Madison Indian Reservation =

Native American tribe with reservation in Washington state

Coordinates: 47.732396°N 122.554893°W

- Location of the Port Madison Indian Reservation
- (2012)

Regions with significant populations
- Puget Sound, Washington, U.S.

Languages
- English, Lushootseed

Related ethnic groups
- Suquamish, Duwamish, and Sammamish peoples

The Port Madison Indian Reservation is an Indian reservation in the U.S. state of Washington. The reservation is governed by the Suquamish Indian Tribe, a signatory to the Treaty of Point Elliott of 1855. They had 950 enrolled tribal citizens in 2012.

== Location ==
The Port Madison Indian Reservation is located in northern Kitsap County, Washington and consists of 7,657 acres, of which 1,475 acres are owned by the Suquamish Tribe, 2,601 acres are owned by individual citizens of the Suquamish Tribe, and 3,581 acres are owned by non-citizens.

The reservation is divided into two separate parcels by the geographic feature Miller Bay. The towns of Suquamish and Indianola both lie within the bounds of the reservation. A resident population of 6,536 persons was counted in the 2000 census.

== History ==
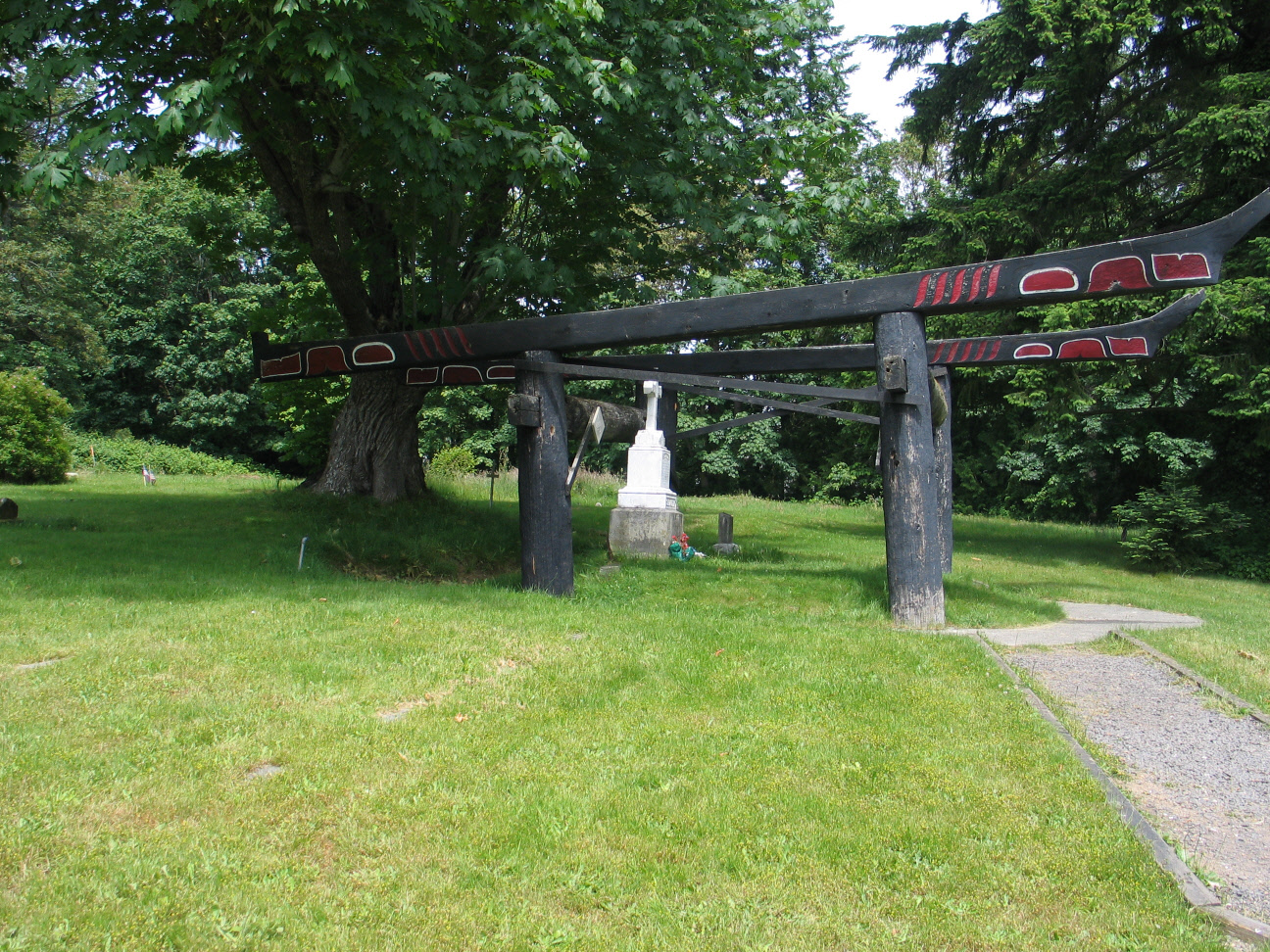
Chief Seattle's final resting place on the Port Madison Reservation in Suquamish, Washington in 2008

The reservation was authorized by the Point Elliott Treaty of January 22, 1855, for the Suquamish people, and was established by an executive order issued October 21, 1864. Other Coast Salish peoples, including the Duwamish and Sammamish, also moved to the reservation. When the land was reserved by the Point Elliott Treaty, all land was held by Tribal members and designated for their sole use. However, a series of procedures designed to accommodate non-Indigenous land acquisition created a situation where the reservation is widely interspersed with non-Tribal ownership.

== Economic development ==
None of the tribe's reservation is zoned for agriculture. In 2012, the tribe established a shellfish nursery on a floating dock, where they raise clams.

Successful economic development since the early 1990s has given the Suquamish Tribe government the ability to reacquire land lost during the allotment era, and "the Tribe and Tribal members now own more than half of the land on the reservation for the first time in recent history," Suquamish Tribe communications director April Leigh said in a story in the North Kitsap Herald. Recent major acquisitions include White Horse Golf Club in 2010, placed into trust in March 2014; and 200 acres known as the Place of the Bear, in the Cowling Creek watershed, in November 2014.

== Important sites ==
Completion of the Suquamish Museum in 2012 helped solidify Suquamish Village as a walkable cultural district which includes:

- The grave of Chief Si'ahl, or Seattle, at the Suquamish Cemetery
- Old Man House Park, the former site of Old Man House, the largest winter longhouse in the Salish Sea
- The Suquamish Veterans Memorial, with honor poles depicting Chief Kitsap and Chief Seattle
- The House of Awakened Culture, overlooking Port Madison
- Suquamish Clearwater Casino Resort, located near the Agate Pass bridge at Suquamish Way and Highway 305, is an events and entertainment destination, with 15,000 square feet of meeting space, a hotel with 183 rooms overlooking Agate Pass, and a showcase of Coast Salish art

== Notable residents ==
- Chief Seattle (Suquamish/Duwamish, ca. 1786–1866), military leader and diplomat
