= Northwest College of Art & Design =

For-profit art school in Tacoma, Washington

- Type: For-profit art college
- Established: 1982
- President: Craig Freeman
- Location: Tacoma, Washington, United States; 47°15′09″N 122°26′20″W
- Nickname: NCAD
- Website: https://www.ncad.edu

Northwest College of Art & Design (NCAD) is a private for-profit college in Tacoma, Washington that focuses on the visual arts. The college offer the Bachelor of Fine Arts degree. Student enrollment is usually "under 125" in a given academic year. The college is accredited by the Accrediting Commission of Career Schools and Colleges.

== History ==
The school was established in 1982. Initially it was in Lemolo in Poulsbo. In 1991 the institution, then the Northwest College of Art, began leasing the former Mains Manor in Suquamish, and in 2000 Craig Freeman, the founder of the school, bought the property. The Suquamish tribe had purchased the former college building for $5.03 million on November 28, 2017, and made it into the current Chief Kitsap Building. The college, at that time, moved to Tacoma, having purchased a building there.
