= Suquamish, Washington =

- Census-designated place
- Location of Suquamish, Washington
- Coordinates: 47°43′27″N 122°34′54″W
- Country: United States
- State: Washington
- County: Kitsap

Area
  - Total: 7.6 sq mi (19.7 km^{2})
  - Land: 6.8 sq mi (17.7 km^{2})
  - Water: 0.77 sq mi (2.0 km^{2})
- Elevation: 220 ft (67 m)

Population (2020)
  - Total: 4,266
  - Density: 624/sq mi (241/km^{2})
- Time zone: UTC-8 (Pacific (PST))
  - Summer (DST): UTC-7 (PDT)
- ZIP Code: 98392
- Area code(s): 360, 564
- FIPS code: 53-69170
- GNIS feature ID: 2410037

Suquamish is a census-designated place (CDP) in Kitsap County, Washington, United States. The population was 4,266 at the 2020 census. Comprising the Port Madison Indian Reservation, it is the burial site of Chief Seattle and was the site of the Suquamish tribe winter longhouse dxʷsəq’ʷəb, also known as the Old Man House. The region also hosts the Suquamish Museum.

== Geography ==
Suquamish is located in northern Kitsap County. The village of Suquamish is in the northeast part of the CDP, and Washington State Route 305 crosses the southern part, leading southeast across the Agate Pass Bridge to Bainbridge Island and west 4 miles (6 km) to Poulsbo.

According to the United States Census Bureau, the Suquamish CDP has a total area of 7.6 square miles (19.7 km^{2}), of which 6.8 square miles (17.7 km^{2}) are land and 0.77 square miles (2.0 km^{2}), or 10.21%, are water.

== History ==
The Suquamish people have lived in the Puget Sound, including the area around the current town of Suquamish, Washington, for thousands of years. When Europeans began moving to the Americas, diseases spread to the Suquamish and killed many people.

In 1855, members of the Suquamish Tribe signed the Treaty of Point Elliott, which created the Port Madison Reservation. Its land included dxʷsəq’ʷəb (the place of the clear salt water), a winter village around the Old Man House. The longhouse's residents had included Chief Seattle and Chief Kitsap. When Chief Seattle died in 1866, he was buried in a cemetery, now called the Suquamish Cemetery, near the village.

After Chief Seattle died, the U.S. Indian Agent for the Port Madison Reservation, William DeShaw, burned down the dxʷsəq’ʷəb longhouse. His goal was to force the 600-800 Suquamish residents of the area to leave and change their living style, moving to single-family houses in other areas of the reservation. Most families remained at dxʷsəq’ʷəb. After the Dawes Act was passed in 1887, the U.S. government used more excuses for taking reservation land from tribal members to sell to non-native developers. Through sales and seizures, pieces of the Port Madison Reservation land began to move to non-native ownership. Many Suquamish remained at dxʷsəq’ʷəb in spite of the U.S. government's efforts to disperse them.

In 1904, the U.S. military took the land around dxʷsəq’ʷəb from the Suquamish Tribe. They initially claimed it would be used to build a fort, but later sold it to non-native developers. Kitsap County also placed racial restrictive covenants on private land in the county, requiring that land only be sold to white people. Because the claimed land covered most of the village, many Suquamish residents were forced to move elsewhere by 1906, including nearby towns like Indianola. During this period, Suquamish children were forced to attend American Indian residential schools run by the U.S. government, which sought to erase Suquamish culture.

Joe Hillaire, married to Suquamish tribal member Lena Legg-Hillaire, created the Lands In The Sky Totem Pole for the 1962 Seattle World's Fair. It stood atop a hill near the town of Suquamish for decades, giving the mound the nickname Totem Pole Hill. The hill was later chosen to host the Suquamish Veterans Memorial, a structure made of poles and canoes that honor veterans, Chief Kitsap, Chief Seattle, and the original totem pole.

In 1983, the Suquamish Tribe established the Suquamish Museum. A one-acre park around the site of the dxʷsəq’ʷəb longhouse, or the Old Man House, was returned to the Suquamish Tribe in 2004. In 2009, the Suquamish Tribe built the House of Awakened Culture as their first traditional communal space since 1870, when the longhouse was burned. The building is used as a ceremonial, governmental, research, and education space.

== Demographics ==
Historical population
Census	Pop.	Note	%±
1980	1,498		—
1990	3,105		107.3%
2000	3,510		13.0%
2010	4,140		17.9%
2020	4,266		3.0%
U.S. Decennial Census; 1970 1980 1990; 2000 2010

As of the census of 2000, there were 3,510 people, 1,459 households, and 948 families residing in the CDP. The population density was 513.1 people per square mile (198.1/km^{2}). There were 1,580 housing units at an average density of 231.0/sq mi (89.2/km^{2}). The racial makeup of the CDP was 81.3% White, 0.3% African American, 9.6% Native American, 2.4% Asian, 0.2% Pacific Islander, 1.3% from other races, and 4.8% from two or more races. Hispanic or Latino of any race were 3.1% of the population.

There were 1,459 households, out of which 30.2% had children under the age of 18 living with them, 52.0% were married couples living together, 8.6% had a female householder with no husband present, and 35.0% were non-families. 28.0% of all households were made up of individuals, and 9.3% had someone living alone who was 65 years of age or older. The average household size was 2.40 and the average family size was 2.92.

In the CDP, the population was spread out, with 24.2% under the age of 18, 6.4% from 18 to 24, 29.3% from 25 to 44, 27.2% from 45 to 64, and 12.9% who were 65 years of age or older. The median age was 40 years. For every 100 females, there were 97.2 males. For every 100 females age 18 and over, there were 93.5 males.

The median income for a household in the CDP was $46,667, and the median income for a family was $55,759. Males had a median income of $41,860 versus $27,296 for females. The per capita income for the CDP was $22,515. About 6.2% of families and 8.5% of the population were below the poverty line, including 8.1% of those under age 18 and 10.8% of those age 65 or over.

== Education ==
Chief Kitsap Academy, a grade 6-12 school, is in Suquamish.

Northwest College of Art & Design was formerly in Suquamish. In 1991 the institution, then the Northwest College of Art, began leasing the former Mains Manor, and in 2000 Craig Freeman, the founder of the school, bought the property. The Squamish tribe had purchased the former college building for $5.03 million on November 28, 2017 and later performed renovations, creating the Chief Kitsap Building.

== See also ==
- Old Man House
