= Stkamish =

Historical Coast Salish people of Washington state

The Stkamish were a historical Coast Salish people of the White River watershed in present-day Washington. Their name was recorded in nineteenth-century sources as Sté-kah-mish, St-kah-mish, and St-Ka-mish. The Stkamish were among the Southern Lushootseed-speaking peoples later associated with the Muckleshoot Indian Tribe.

== Name and territory ==
Ethnologist George Gibbs recorded the name as "Sté-kah-mish" in his survey of Indigenous names west of the Cascade Range between 1853 and 1856, identifying them with the White River. In another 1854 list, Gibbs used the spelling "St-Ka-mish" and placed them on the main White River.

Anthropologist Barbara Lane noted that the ending -mish or -amish appears in several local Coast Salish names and interpreted it as meaning "people of". She suggested that the name Stkamish may have referred to people connected with the Stuck River, a watercourse in the White River system. Lane distinguished the Stkamish from the neighboring Smulkamish of another part of the White River and the Skopamish of the Green River.

The Stkamish were part of the Southern Lushootseed-speaking communities whose territories extended along the White and Green rivers and into the foothills of the Cascade Range.

== Treaty period ==
The Stkamish were named in the preamble of the 1855 Treaty of Point Elliott, where the spelling "St-kah-mish" appears among the tribes and bands represented at the treaty council. Although the treaty named the Stkamish, Skopamish and Smulkamish among the represented groups, none of the individual signatories was identified in the treaty text as a Stkamish representative.

During the treaty negotiations, territorial governor Isaac Stevens grouped several smaller communities under broader political labels that did not always match Indigenous social organization. In United States v. Washington, the federal district court found that Stevens treated the Stkamish, Skopamish and Smulkamish as part of the Duwamish for treaty purposes, and that Chief Seattle's signature was treated by Stevens and the United States as being made on behalf of those bands as well.

== Relationship with the Muckleshoot Tribe ==
The name Muckleshoot originally referred to Muckleshoot Prairie rather than to a separate pre-treaty tribe. The federal district court in United States v. Washington found that no aboriginal band or tribe known collectively as Muckleshoot existed at treaty time. Instead, people from the Green and White River areas, including bands associated with the Treaty of Point Elliott, were removed to and consolidated on the Muckleshoot Reservation. Over time, they became known as the Muckleshoot Indians or Muckleshoot Tribe.

Lane identified the Stkamish, Skopamish and Smulkamish as ancestral groups of the community that later became the Muckleshoot Tribe. The United States Court of Appeals for the Ninth Circuit later stated that the Muckleshoot had succeeded to the treaty fishing rights of the Skopamish, Stkamish and Smulkamish, while noting that the Muckleshoot Tribe did not exist under that name at the time of the Treaty of Point Elliott.

== Culture and foodways ==
Available scholarship usually discusses the Stkamish together with neighboring and related longhouse communities, especially the Skopamish and Smulkamish. For that reason, surviving descriptions of culture and foodways cannot always be assigned to the Stkamish alone.

The Stkamish and related Southern Lushootseed-speaking communities were connected through longhouses, kinship, marriage, trade, ceremonies and shared access to seasonal resources. Research on Muckleshoot foodways describes winter villages along waterways and summer movements to fishing, hunting and gathering areas.

Their wider food system included salmon and other fish, terrestrial game, roots, berries, nuts and other plant foods. A historical food assessment of Stkamish, Skopamish and Smulkamish longhouses argues that plants and wild game were more important to these communities than earlier general accounts of Northwest Coast foodways sometimes suggested.

== See also ==
- Duwamish people
- Muckleshoot Indian Tribe
- Treaty of Point Elliott
- White River (Washington)
