= Old Man House =

Coordinates: 47.7241°N 122.5577°W

- Old-Man-House Site (45KP2)
- U.S. National Register of Historic Places
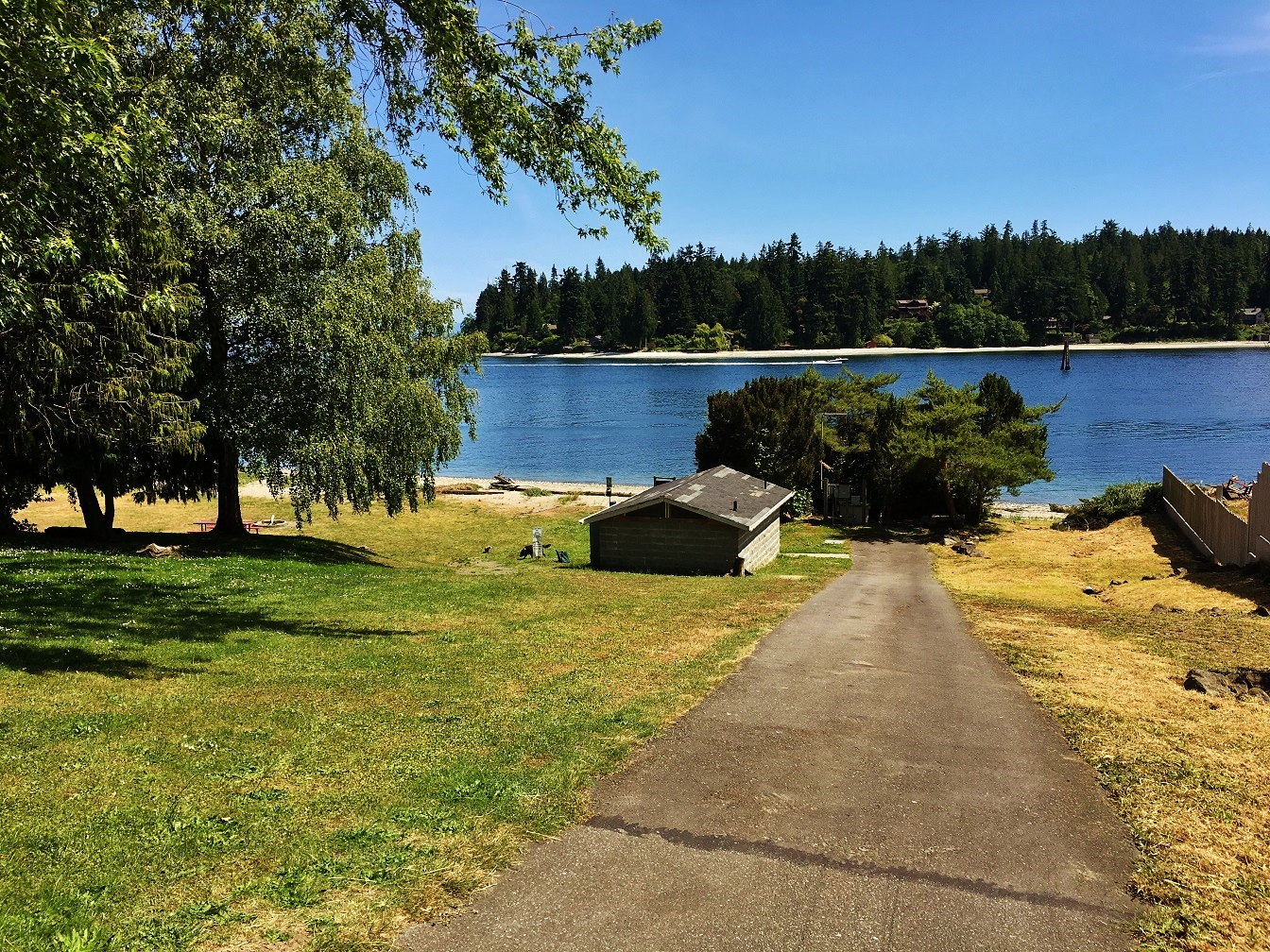
- Old Man House Park in Suquamish on Agate Passage, former location of the Old Man House

- Location within Washington (state)
- Nearest city: Suquamish, Washington
- Area: 1.1 acres (0.45 ha)
- NRHP reference No.: 89002299
- Added to NRHP: January 12, 1990

The Old Man House was the largest winter longhouse in what is now the U.S. state of Washington, once standing on the shore of Puget Sound. It was the center of the Suquamish village of dxʷsəq̓ʷəb on Agate Pass, just south of the present-day town of Suquamish. At one time, it was home to the famous Suquamish chiefs Kitsap and Seattle (who was also half Duwamish).

== Etymology and name ==
The Lushootseed name of the site upon which the house was located is dxʷsəq̓ʷəb, meaning "clear salt water," and is the origin of the name of the Suquamish people: dxʷsəq̓ʷəbš (which means "people of the clear salt water").

The name "Old Man House" comes from the Chinook Jargon word "oleman" meaning "old, worn out," but also meaning "from the old times". "House" in Chinook Jargon refers to any kind of building, or even to individual rooms within them.

== History ==
Archeological investigations have revealed that the village site was occupied for at least 2000 years. Accounts vary as to when the longhouse itself was constructed; many sources indicate it was built in the late 18th or early 19th century, but it might have been built earlier. Reports of the longhouse's size also vary, putting its length between 600 and 1000 feet (approximately 200–300 m).

The lands around Old Man House were retained by the Suquamish tribe after the Point Elliott Treaty was signed in 1855, becoming the Port Madison Indian Reservation. The longhouse was burned down by the U.S. government in 1870 under the orders of William DeShaw, the Indian agent at the reservation. Despite being a close friend of Chief Seattle, DeShaw ordered the Old Man House's destruction after Seattle's death to force the Suquamish to build single-family residences instead of communal dwellings. After it was burned, however, the Suquamish rebuilt their village at the site and continued to live there, which led to DeShaw resigning from the Bureau of Indian Affairs.

In 1886 the federal government divided the reservation into allotments which were assigned to individual Suquamish families. In 1904 the U.S. War Department acquired land along Agate Pass, including the site of Old Man House, to build fortifications to protect the new naval shipyards at Bremerton. The destruction of the longhouse was intended to encourage the Suquamish to spread out across their reservation and take up farming. The village site had to be moved, and the tribe lost much of its water access. The fortifications were never built, and the land purchased by the military was eventually sold in 1937 to a private developer and subdivided for vacation homes. In 1950, the Washington Parks and Recreation Department purchased an acre of waterfront where Old Man House had been located and set it aside as a state park. The park was returned to the Suquamish Tribe on August 12, 2004.

== See also ==
- Port Madison Indian Reservation
- Suquamish Museum and Cultural Center
