= Suquamish Indian Tribe =

Federally recognized tribe in Washington state

Suquamish Indian Tribe suq̓ʷabš
- Federally recognized tribe
- Location of the Suquamish Tribe
- Treaty of Point Elliott: January 22, 1855
- Suquamish constitution: 1965

Population
  - Estimate (2011): 1,050
- Demonym: Suquamish
- Website: suquamish.nsn.us

The Suquamish Tribe (Lushootseed: suq̓ʷabš; officially the Suquamish Indian Tribe) is a federally recognized Native American tribe of primarily Suquamish and Duwamish people located in Washington state.

== Name ==
The name for the Suquamish in their language, Lushootseed, is suq̓ʷabš. The origin of the name is debated. A commonly-stated explanation of the name is that it means "people of the clear saltwater", referring to Agate Pass, or dxʷsəq̓ʷəb. This location was described in the Treaty of Point Elliott as "Noo-sohk-um". Alternatively, another explanation for the name is that it comes from the neighboring Twana language. According to anthropologists and linguists Nile R. Thompson and William W. Elmendorf, the name comes from the Twana word wuq̓ʷatəb, meaning 'drift away' (cf. Twana swuq̓ʷabəš 'Suquamish').

"Suquamish" has historically been spelled Soquamish, Soquam, Swuwkwabsh, and Suqabsh.

== History ==
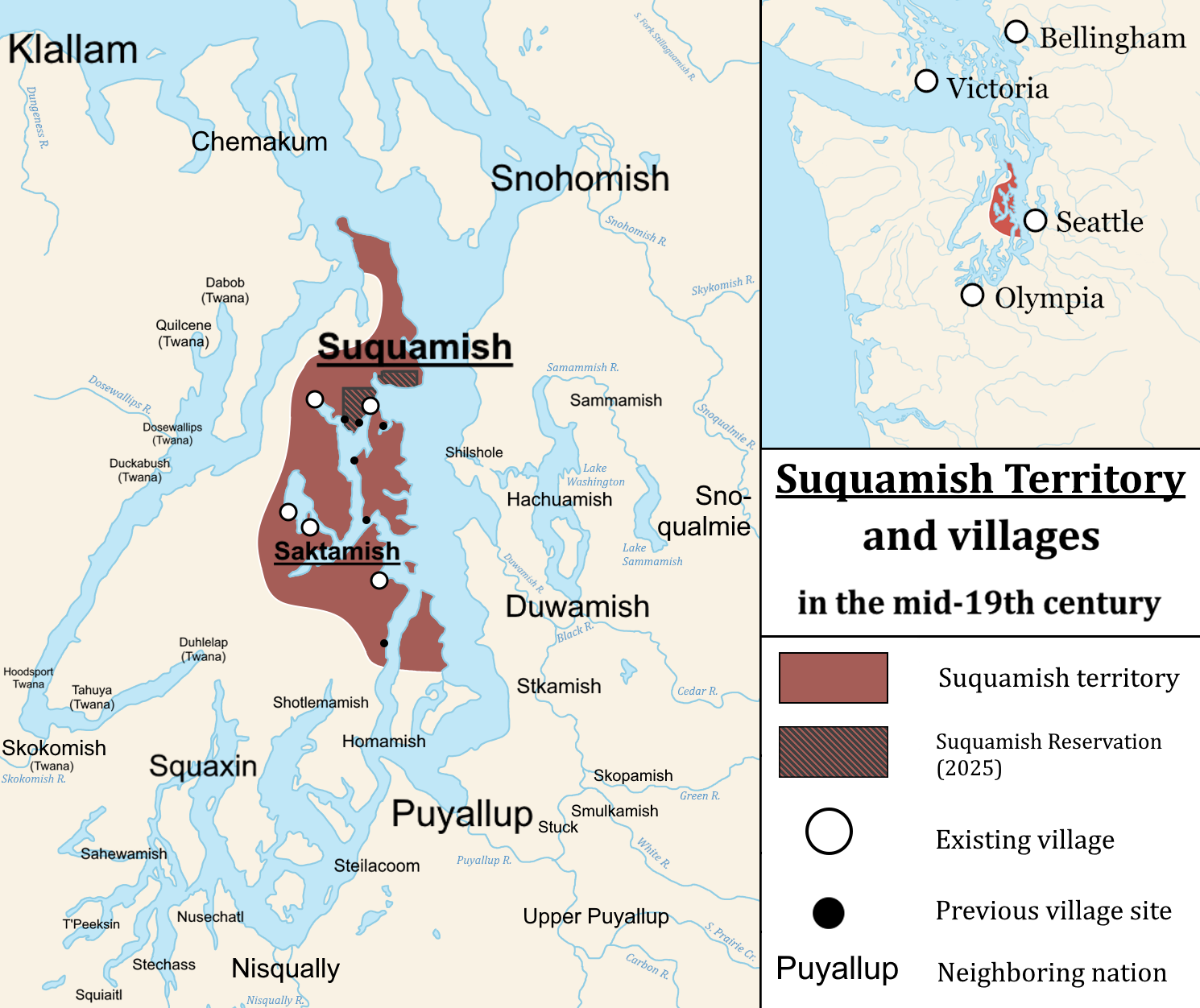
Suquamish territory in the mid-19th century

=== Treaty era ===
The Suquamish Indian Tribe is primarily composed of descendants of the aboriginal Suquamish people, who in 1855 primarily lived on Kitsap Peninsula. At that time, the Suquamish people held the west side of Puget Sound from Hood Canal to Vashon Island, including Bainbridge Island and Blake Island (Lushootseed: tatču).

Around the mid 19th century, the Suquamish remained in six winter villages. These were located at or near what is today Suquamish, Poulsbo, Colby, Point White, Chico, and Phinney Bay. They had previously occupied several others in the region. Today, members of the Suquamish Tribe are descended from these individuals, including those who were present at the Point Elliot treaty negotiations or were signatories to the treaty.

Other than the aboriginal Suquamish, members of the Suquamish Tribe can trace ancestry to a variety of different Indigenous groups in the region, notably the Duwamish people. More than half of the citizens of the Suquamish Tribe are also of Duwamish ancestry, including all members of the tribal council in 2022.

On January 22, 1855, the Suquamish and Duwamish were party to the Treaty of Point Elliott, signed at what is today Mukilteo. Seattle, a prominent leader among the Suquamish and Duwamish, was designated as the head chief of the Suquamish, Duwamish, and "allied tribes" by the treaty commission. Other than Seattle, six Suquamish men and three Duwamish men were designated as chiefs and sub-chiefs. Seattle was a leader of the Suquamish until his death in 1866, after which Jacob Wahelchu (likely a younger relative of one of the signatories who carried his name) was chosen as chief of the reservation Suquamish. Jacob Wahelchu's descendants have remained part of the Suquamish community, and around 1910, they chose the name Jacob and Jacobs as their surname, reflecting the common practice at the time of adopting the father's Christian name as a surname.

=== Reservation era ===
The Point Elliott treaty established the Port Madison Reservation primarily for the Suquamish and Duwamish peoples, although many Duwamish refused to relocate to Suquamish territory.

In the 1870s, the famous Old Man House, the physical and spiritual center of the Suquamish Tribe, was destroyed. Federal agents ordered the burning of the 500 feet (150 m) by 60 feet (18 m) longhouse, which originally housed several families.

=== 20th century ===
After the passage of the Indian Reorganization Act in 1934, the people of the Port Madison Reservation began to rebuild their nation-to-nation relationship with the federal government. The Suquamish Indian Tribe was formally established in 1965, when they adopted a tribal constitution, formed the tribal council, and became a member of the National Congress of American Indians.

In 1974, the treaty rights of the Suquamish Tribe were affirmed in United States v. Washington, commonly known as the Boldt Decision. The Boldt Decision established the Suquamish Tribes and other Washington treaty tribes as co-managers to fisheries in the state, alongside federal and state regulators.

In 1989, the Suquamish Tribe formalized their relationship with Washington State through the Centennial Accord.

=== 21st century ===
The 21st century has been marked by an economic boom as the tribe has re-acquired lands and opened a number of new commercial developments.

The Suquamish Tribe voted to approve same-sex marriage in 2011. The vote was passed without dissent in a 300-person general council meeting, and the tribal council voted unanimously to approve it. The act was described as a way of asserting tribal culture and self-determination.

== Government ==
The Suquamish Tribe is governed the Tribal Council, which is elected by the General Council. The Tribal Council is a seven-member council which has elections every March. Councilmembers serve staggered three-year term. It is led by the chairperson, who only votes in case of a tie.

As of August 2025, the Tribal Council was as follows:

- Chairman: Leonard Forsman
- Vice-chairman: Josh Bagley
- Treasurer: Andrew George
- Secretary: Irene Carpenter
- Luther "Jay" Mills Jr.
- Azure Boure
- Lorilee Morsette

== Port Madison Reservation ==
The Suquamish Tribe governs the Port Madison Indian Reservation, which is located on Kitsap Peninsula. The reservation was created by the Treaty of Point Elliott as a reservation for the Suquamish and Duwamish people. It was one of four reservations created by the treaty.

== Economy ==
The economic development arm of the Suquamish Tribe is Port Madison Enterprises (PME), which was established in 1987. It was created in order to develop community resources, increase the economic well-being of the tribe, and invest in community programs and regional developments. Port Madison Enterprises is the second-largest private-sector employer in Kitsap County with over 700 employees. Port Madison Enterprises oversees tribal businesses, including Clearwater Casino Resort, Clearwater Markets, Kiana Lodge, and the White Horse Golf Club.

== Demographics ==
Suquamish Tribe population (Note: The 1856, 1885, and 1910 population data come from the on-reservation population, while the data after come from Suquamish tribal rolls)
Year	Pop.	±%
1856	441	—
1885	142	−67.8%
1909	180	+26.8%
1910	181	+0.6%
1942	169	−6.6%
1953	183	+8.3%
1985	577	+215.3%
2010	950	+64.6%
2011	1,050	+10.5%
Source: Identity, Treaty Status and Fisheries of the Suquamish Tribe of the Port Madison Reservation

Around 1855, there were around 500 Suquamish people. A census in 1856 reported that there were 441 Suquamish on the Port Madison Reservation, that being 208 males, 199 females, 14 male slaves, and 20 female slaves. The census also stated that there were about 6 families, or 40 people, living off the reservation at the time. The reservation population declined by 1885 and increased thereafter.

== Culture ==
=== Language ===
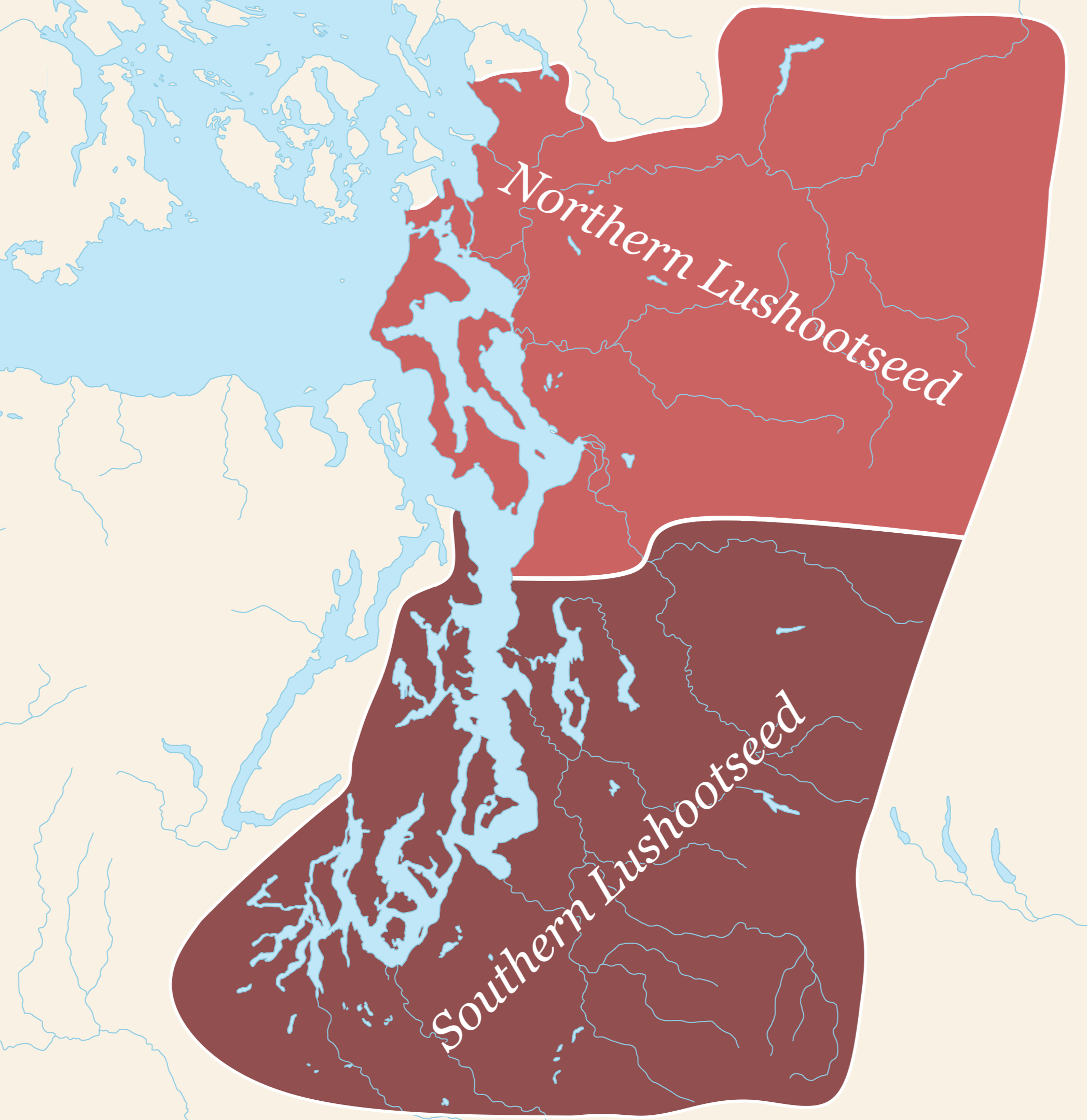
Original area of the Lushootseed language

The original language of the Suquamish people is Lushootseed, a Coast Salish language originally spoken on Puget Sound from the Cascades to Hood Canal. The dialect spoken by the Suquamish is Southern Lushootseed.

Due to the American government's attempts to assimilate the Suquamish people, the language declined over the 19th and 20th centuries, almost to the point of total loss. Despite this, the Suquamish Tribe is involved in revitalizing the language. The tribe has a Traditional Language Program that teaches Lushootseed to schoolchildren as well as community members.

=== Weaving ===
Basketry was traditionally a widely-practiced art among the Suquamish. Baskets were used for a number of different utilities, including holding water, cooking, and carrying food and goods. Today, the Suquamish Tribe continues to practice the art of traditional basketweaving. The practice is being revitalized, with several Suquamish citizens specializing in basketry hosting workshops for tribal members. One expert Suquamish weaver is Ed Carriere, who began making baskets at the age of twelve. Carriere learned from his great-grandmother, who herself was the daughter of the last Suquamish chief.

Other materials are also woven, particularly cattails and wool. Cattail was traditionally used in the creation of cattail mats, which were used as summer housing material, wall liners, and cushions. Wool was traditionally used in blankets which served both as warm coverings and as ceremonial symbols, and was originally gathered from mountain goats or wooly dogs.

== Notable Suquamish citizens ==
- Seattle (c. 1780~86-1866) - Chief of the Suquamish tribe
- Martha George (1892-1987) - Former chairwoman of the Suquamish Tribe and expert basketweaver
- Lawrence Weaver (1899-1991) - Former chairman of the Suquamish Tribe
- Leonard Forsman - Chairman of the Suquamish Tribe, anthropologist, and archaeologist
- Cecile Hansen - Chairwoman of the unrecognized Duwamish Tribe, enrolled Suquamish tribal member
