= History of Seattle before 1900 =

Two conflicting perspectives exist for the early history of Seattle. There is the "establishment" view, which favors the centrality of the Denny Party (generally the Denny, Mercer, Terry, and Boren families), and Henry Yesler. A second, less didactic view, advanced particularly by historian Bill Speidel and others such as Murray Morgan, sees David Swinson "Doc" Maynard as a key figure, perhaps the key figure. In the late nineteenth century, when Seattle had become a thriving town, several members of the Denny Party still survived; they and many of their descendants were in local positions of power and influence. Maynard was about ten years older and died relatively young, so he was not around to make his own case. The Denny Party were generally conservative Methodists, teetotalers, Whigs, and Republicans, while Maynard was a drinker and a Democrat. He felt that well-run prostitution could be a healthy part of a city's economy. He was also on friendly terms with the region's Native Americans, while many of the Denny Party were not. Thus Maynard was not on the best of terms with what became the Seattle Establishment, especially after the Puget Sound War. He was nearly written out of the city's history until Morgan's 1951 book Skid Road and Speidel's research in the 1960s and 1970s.

== Founding ==
What is now Seattle has been inhabited since at least the end of the last glacial period (c. 8000 BCE—10,000 years ago). Archaeological excavations at what is now called West Point in Discovery Park, Magnolia confirm settlement within the current city for at least 4,000 years and probably much longer. The area of [toˈlɑltu] ("herring house") and later [hɑˈʔɑpus] ("where there are horse clams") at the then-mouth of the Duwamish River in what is now the Industrial District had been inhabited since the 6th century CE. The Dkh^{w}'Duw'Absh (People of the Inside), and the Xachua'bsh (People of the Large Lake), of the (Skagit-Nisqually) Lushootseed Coast Salish Native American Nations occupied at least 17 villages in the mid-1850s (13 within what are now the city limits), living in some 93 permanent longhouses (khwaac'ál'al) along the lower Duwamish River, Elliott Bay, Salmon Bay, Portage Bay, Lake Washington within what is now Seattle, as well as Lake Sammamish, and the Duwamish, Black, and Cedar Rivers in what is now metropolitan Seattle. The Dkh^{w}'Duw'Absh and Xachua'bsh are today represented by the Duwamish Tribe.

George Vancouver was the first European to visit the Seattle area in May 1792 during his 1791–95 expedition to chart the Pacific Northwest; the first White forays for sites in the area were in the 1830s.

The founding of Seattle is usually dated from the arrival of the Denny Party on November 13, 1851, at Alki Point. The group had travelled overland from the Midwest to Portland, Oregon, then made a short ocean journey up the Pacific coast into Puget Sound, with the express intent of founding a town. The next April, Arthur A. Denny abandoned the original site at Alki in favor of a better-protected site on Elliott Bay, near the south end of what is now downtown Seattle. Around the same time, Doc Maynard began settling the land immediately south of Denny's. Charles C. Terry and others hung on at Alki for a few more years, but eventually it became clear that Maynard and Denny had chosen the better location.

The first plats for Seattle were filed on May 23, 1853. Nominal legal land settlement was provisionally established in 1855 (with treaty terms for what is now Seattle not implemented). Doc Maynard's land claim lay south of today's Yesler Way, encompassing most of today's Pioneer Square Historical District and the International District. He based his street grid on strict compass bearings. The more northerly plats of Arthur A. Denny and Carson D. Boren encompassed Pioneer Square north of what is now Yesler Way; the heart of the current downtown; and the western slope of First Hill. These had street grids that more or less followed the shoreline. The downtown grid from Yesler Way north to Stewart Street is oriented 32 degrees west of north; from Stewart north to Denny Way the orientation is 49 degrees west of north. The result is a tangle of streets where the grids clash. (See also Street layout of Seattle.)

Both Alki and the settlement that was to become Seattle relied in their early decades on the timber industry, shipping out logs (and, later, milled timber) to build and rebuild San Francisco which, as Bill Speidel points out, kept burning down. Seattle and Alki offered plenty of trees to build San Francisco and plenty of hills to slide them down to water. A climax forest of trees up to 1,000–2,000 years old and towering as high as nearly 400 feet (120 m) covered much of what is now Seattle. Today, none of that size remain anywhere in the world.

== Relations with Native Americans ==
This section draws heavily on Bill Speidel, Sons of the Profits (1967) and Doc Maynard (1978). Doc Maynard and Murray Morgan, Skid Road (1951, 1960, 1982) are especially useful on the events regarding resistance nominally led by Kamiakim in the January 1856 attack on the town.

=== Before the Treaty of Point Elliott (1855) ===
Early European-American settlers in Seattle had a sometimes rocky relationship with local Native Americans since they were steadily taking away Native lands and, in many cases, mistreating Native people. There were numerous deadly attacks by white settlers against Native Americans and by Native Americans against white settlers.

Bill Speidel writes of white settlers in Sons of the Profits, "The general consensus of the community was that killing an Indian was a matter of no graver consequence than shooting a cougar or a bear..." Against this background, Doc Maynard stands out for his excellent relations with Native people. He and Chief Seattle (Suquamish/Duwamish, c. 1786–1866) were friends and allies. Maynard profited greatly from this friendship. During an 1856 violent outbreak of hostilities, Maynard risked the wrath of his fellow white settlers by protecting neutral American Indians. However, outside of some old-time trappers and traders, he held a minority perspective.

Denny Lander and Edward Lander, the first local federal judge, also stood out in that they believed that the law should be applied fairly and equally: to them, murder was murder, regardless of the race of the victim. However, they found it was impossible to get this view upheld by white juries of the time. In Sons of the Profits, Speidel recounts a case of two vigilantes who had hanged a Native American man. After a series of (possibly deliberate) irregularities in their trial, the jury acquitted these obviously guilty men on a technicality.

Territorial Governor Isaac Stevens probably did more damage to relations between settlers and Native Americans than any one other person. He put a bounty on scalps of "bad Indians". He declared martial law to prevent Lander from issuing writs of habeas corpus for people who were held in jail for little other reason than sympathizing with Native people. On at least two occasions, he actually had Lander himself jailed.

Perhaps worst of all in its consequences for relations, he dealt dishonestly in treaties, among other things making verbal promises that were not matched by what was written down. Local tribes had at least a three-decade history of dealing with the Hudson's Bay Company, who had developed a reputation for driving a hard bargain, but sticking honestly to what they agreed to, and for treating Whites and Indians impartially. This continued through the dealings of the local Bureau of Indian Affairs Superintendent General, Joel Palmer, who (along with Maynard's brother-in-law, Indian Agent Mike Simmons) was among the few even-handed men in the BIA.

Consequently, when Stevens, in drafting treaties, acted in a manner that Judge James Wickerson would characterize 40 years later as "unfair, unjust, ungenerous, and illegal", some Native people, quite unprepared for such behavior by the official representatives of the white man's power, were angered to the point of war. The unjust and deliberately confusing Western Washington treaties, including the Treaty of Medicine Creek (1854) and Treaty of Point Elliott (1855) were followed by the yet more provocative Treaty of Walla Walla (1855). Stevens ignored federal instructions to focus on sorting out the areas where Native peoples and European-American settlers found themselves immediately adjacent to one another, or, from the other perspective, where settlers moved onto Native land.

=== After the Treaty of Point Elliott (1855) ===
By the time of the Treaty of Point Elliott, Maynard had already made an ally of Chief Seattle by arranging to have him somewhat compensated for the use of his name for the new town. Chief Seattle's ancestral religion and Coast Salish culture have beliefs opposed to speaking or using a person's name after that person's death and prior to protocols, so this was not a simple matter, although Chief Seattle soon converted to a somewhat eclectic Roman Catholicism. At Point Elliott, Maynard cemented this alliance (and greatly benefited his emerging town) by negotiating for Chief Seattle and the Duwamish a separate, more favorable treaty, which, in exchange for a relatively large reservation (promised, not yet ever fulfilled), Natives abandoned all aboriginal title to 54,790 acres (221.7 km^{2}), constituting an area almost identical to the eventual twentieth-century city limits of the City of Seattle, for nearly nothing at the time.

With Stevens in Eastern Washington sowing discord, Secretary of State Charles Mason was left in charge of the state government. Yakama Chief Kamiakim had effectively declared war and told nations such as the Duwamish that they could either join him or would be treated as enemies. By autumn, there had been an exchange of massacres by Whites and settlers, in which both sides seemed ready to kill whichever people of the other race were at hand, with no regard for whether these particular individuals had in any way previously wronged them. (This cycle of retaliatory violence would reach its logical conclusion two years after the war, when si'ab Lescay (Chief Leschi) was tried and condemned to death for murder, and hanged before his appeal could be properly heard.)

Maynard got Mike Simmons to deputize him as a Special Indian Agent, then—in a complex, multi-way transaction—cemented a relationship with acting governor Mason and some other key figures by selling them some prime Seattle real estate at a good price. He then used the money from the transaction to buy supplies and a boat to ferry Chief Seattle and his Duwamish to what was effectively a privately funded reservation at Port Madison, west of Puget Sound. He also, at enormous personal risk, spent the first several weeks of November 1855 traveling around eastern King County, which was already penetrated by some of Kamiakim's men, informing several hundred other neutral natives that there was a safe place they could go. Most of them took him up on it. Induced fear effected abandonment of places Natives were otherwise loath to leave.

(In Doc Maynard, Bill Speidel reports that not all of the Seattle businessmen were pleased with his getting the local Indians out of the way. Henry Yesler and others found themselves deprived of much of their labor force and wrote letters of protest to the territorial government.)

Shortly before Stevens returned to Olympia January 16, 1856, Captain E.D. Keyes had managed an uneasy informal truce by communicating with, among others, Chief Leschi. Stevens promptly undercut the truce, saying of the natives, "Nothing but death is mete punishment for their perfidy".

On January 25, 1856, Stevens announced, "The town of Seattle is in as much danger of an Indian attack as are the cities of San Francisco or New York".

On January 26, 1856, natives attacked the Seattle settlement. Friendly Indians permitted to stay in Seattle had warned the Whites, and sentries had been put on patrol. In the morning, acting on tip, a shell was lobbed into the forest above the town, what is now First Hill. First fire. The Indians fired back, small arms. Settlers rushed from their cabins to the blockhouse. The defenses were based on a large wooden blockhouse, a five-foot-high wood-and-earth breastwork, various ravines—and the cannon just offshore zeroed (bearing and range laid in). The settlement was defended at the time by the 150 man, 566 ton, 16 gun sloop-of-war Decatur, the bark Bronte, seven out-of-town civilian volunteers, fifty local volunteers, and at least 6 Marines from the Decatur. The number of attackers is impossible to establish: estimates range from a mere thirty to 2000 with more than a hundred killed, another hundred wounded. Not so much as a single Indian body was ever found, not even a sign of blood. The Indians had made no attempt to storm the stockade. No one in the blockhouse was much interested in venturing out on attack. Both sides had paused for dinner. There were two known fatalities: a young volunteer and a 14-year-old boy, both of whom had neglected to stay behind cover. No one who kept inside the stockade was wounded. A few things do seem clear in this fog of war: nearly all of the local volunteers hardly left the blockhouse, the Navy took no combat casualties in this land battle, and Kamiakim's forces were successfully driven off, but also took few (if any) fatalities. Still, they seem to have drawn the conclusion that attacking a major settlement wasn't worth the trouble. The only remaining major battle of the war was to occur March 10 at Connell's Prairie near Puyallup.

=== After the skirmish "Battle of Seattle" ===
The cessation of general hostilities did not diminish Stevens' crusading zeal against the natives. He encouraged fratricidal war by offering the "good Indians" a bounty for scalps of the "bad Indians". The largest collector of such rewards was Chief Seattle's sworn rival, Chief Patkanim, a leader among the Snoqualmie and Snohomish. According to Speidel, Patkanim was not above killing and scalping his own slaves as a means of generating income. Speidel also narrates (in Sons of the Profits) that on one occasion this led to a native being killed and scalped in Stevens' own office.

Stevens continually attempted to recruit Chief Seattle and the Duwamish to this cause. Maynard and Chief Seattle, who had already gone to great lengths to help keep the Duwamish at a safe distance from Patkanim, never actually refused the Governor's request, but instead maintained a successful pattern of stalling and passive resistance to avoid ever providing any Duwamish fighters to further Stevens' scheme.

The 1862 Pacific Northwest smallpox epidemic killed roughly half of the native population. Documentation in archives and historical epidemiology demonstrates that Governmental policies furthered the progress of the epidemic among the natives.

The Seattle Establishment, including 'Doc' Maynard, petitioned the Territorial Delegate to Congress in 1866 to deny treaty rights to the Duwamish. The commitments made by the United States government in the Point Elliott Treaty have not yet been met.

== Yesler's Mill ==
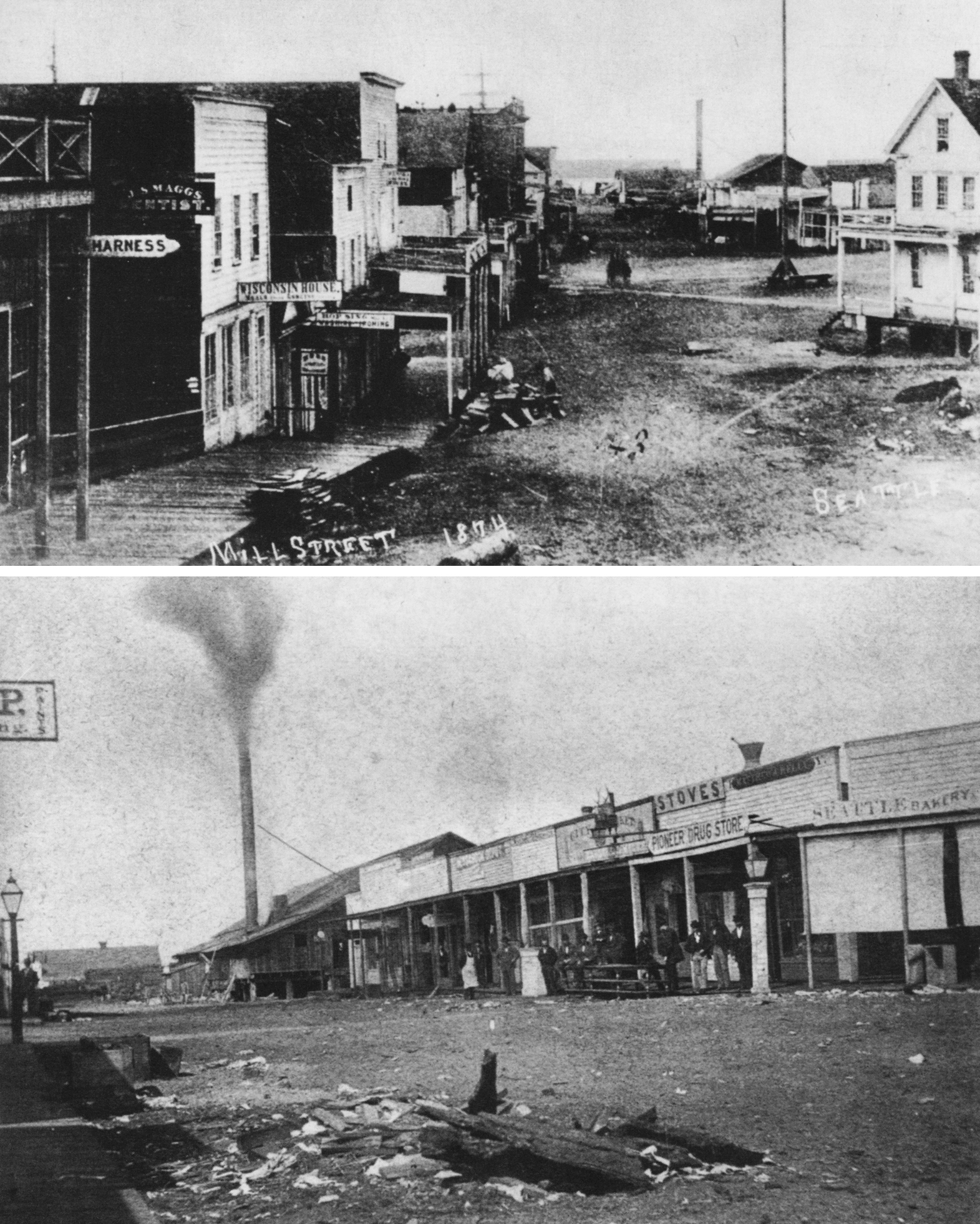
Top: View looking west to Yesler's Mill at the end of the street (see smokestack) and nearby cookhouse; the tall pole in the road on the right is where the Pioneer Square pergola stands today, (1874) Bottom: Yesler's Mill, stores, and taverns on Skid Road (Mill Street, now Yesler Way)

Seattle's topography was rugged compared to Alki, which hampered initial development. However, when Henry Yesler brought financial backing from a Massillon, Ohio capitalist, John E. McLain, to start a steam sawmill, he chose a location in Seattle on the waterfront, where Maynard and Denny's plats met. Thereafter, Seattle would dominate the lumber industry.

Yesler selected this location because of a critical flaw with Alki as a port: the tides sweeping down south through the Sound from Canada, which made it impossible to build out into the water.

The road leading down the hill to that mill, later called Mill Street and now known as Yesler Way, was originally known as the Skid Road, the route for skidding logs down to the mill, hence the term "Skid Road" or corrupted as "Skid Row" for a rundown or dilapidated urban area, as the mill declined and the area collapsed with the Crash and Great Depression.

Via the bargaining power of his mill, Yesler wrangled about 20,220 square feet (1,878 m^{2}) of prime land from some of the original settlers. Besides his mill, Yesler opened a cookhouse that set much of the city's activity firmly within his land. Though the mill was never lucrative, the strategic location of Yesler's land still made him a millionaire. Like many of Seattle's early entrepreneurs, Yesler was not always the most scrupulous about how he made his money; he borrowed $30,000 at 8% interest to build the mill, and repaid McLain only after McLain took him to court three times.

== A city grows ==
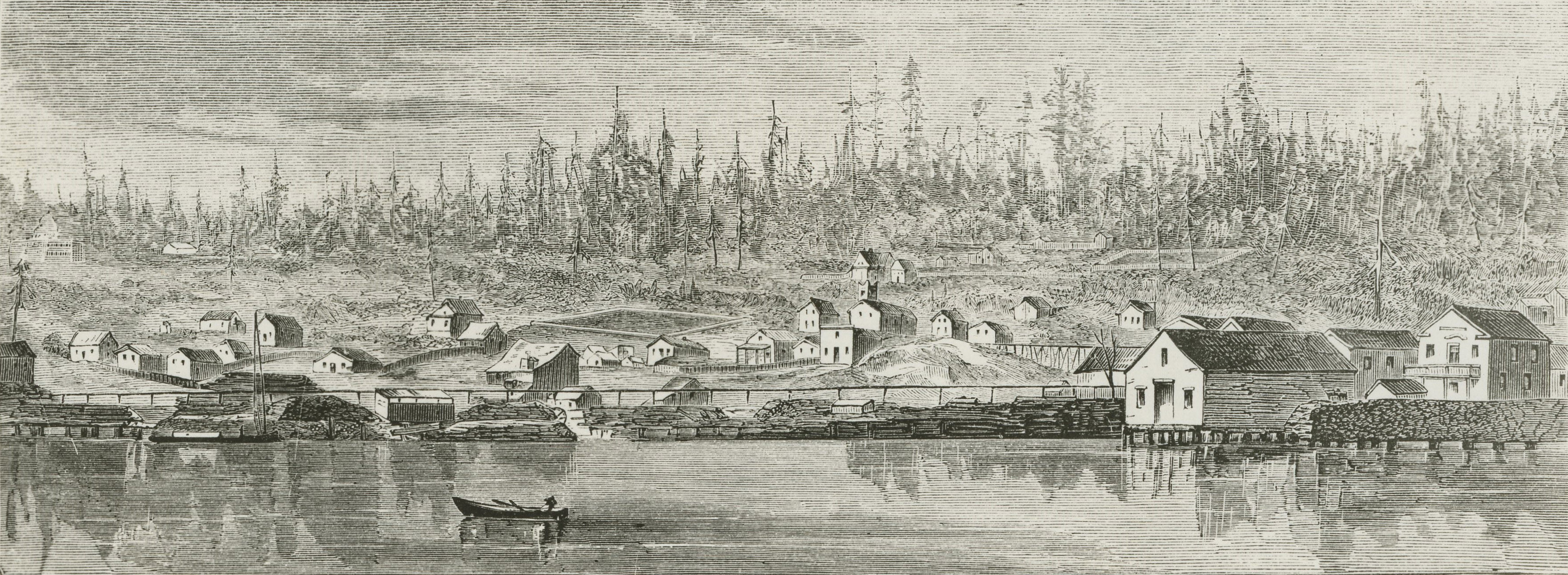
Seattle, engraving from "Harper's New Monthly Magazine" (September 1870).

The first Seattle fortunes were founded on logs, and later milled timber, shipped south for the construction of buildings in San Francisco. Seattle itself, in the early years, was, of course, also a place of wooden buildings, and remained so until the Great Fire of June 6, 1889. Even the early system of delivering water to the settlement used hollowed-out logs for pipes. Seattle in its early years relied on the timber industry, shipping logs (and, later, milled timber) to San Francisco.

Terry sold out Alki (which, after his departure barely held on as a settlement), moved to Seattle and began acquiring land. He either owned or partially owned the first ships that allowed Seattle's timber industry to exist by providing a means to move the product to market. He eventually gave a land grant to the University of the Territory of Washington that housed its original campus and today makes the University of Washington a downtown landlord collecting rents of more than $1 million a year. He worked in politics to establish street grades, a water system, and a host of other services (which, not coincidentally, benefited him as one of the city's largest landholders).

Meanwhile, Arthur Denny became the second richest man in town, after Yesler, and got himself elected to territorial legislature. From that position, he tried unsuccessfully to get the territorial capital moved to Seattle from its then supposedly temporary location in Olympia. The other potential money prizes were the territorial penitentiary and the territorial university. When the politics all played out, Vancouver wound up as the proposed capital, Port Townsend was supposed to get the penitentiary, and Seattle got the university. Apparently, Seattle was the only real winner in this deal: to this day, Olympia remains the capital of Washington; the main state penitentiary is in Walla Walla.

The legislature had tacked on the requirement that a grant of 10 acres (40,000 m^{2}) of land would be required for the university to be built, which they presumably thought would be sufficient to prevent its construction. However, Denny wanted his town to grow and donated the land, creating what would be "one of the biggest and most effective central core properties in the United States". The University of the Territory of Washington (later the University of Washington) opened on November 4, 1861. There were barely enough students to run it as a high school, let alone as a university, but over time it grew into its originally grandiose name.

The logging town developed rapidly into a small city. Despite being officially founded by the Methodists of the Denny Party, Seattle quickly developed a reputation as a wide-open town, a haven for prostitution, liquor, and gambling. Some attribute this, at least in part, to Maynard, who arrived separately from the Denny Party, and who had a rather different view of what it would take to build a city, based on his experience in growing Cleveland, Ohio. By selling some of his land cheaply on condition that businesses be soon built upon them, he recruited professionals, such as blacksmiths and purveyors of vice, who enhanced the value of his remaining land. The city's first brothel dated from 1861 and was founded by one John Pinnell (or Pennell), who was already involved in similar business in San Francisco. Real estate records show that nearly all of the city's first 60 businesses were on, or immediately adjacent to, Maynard's plat.

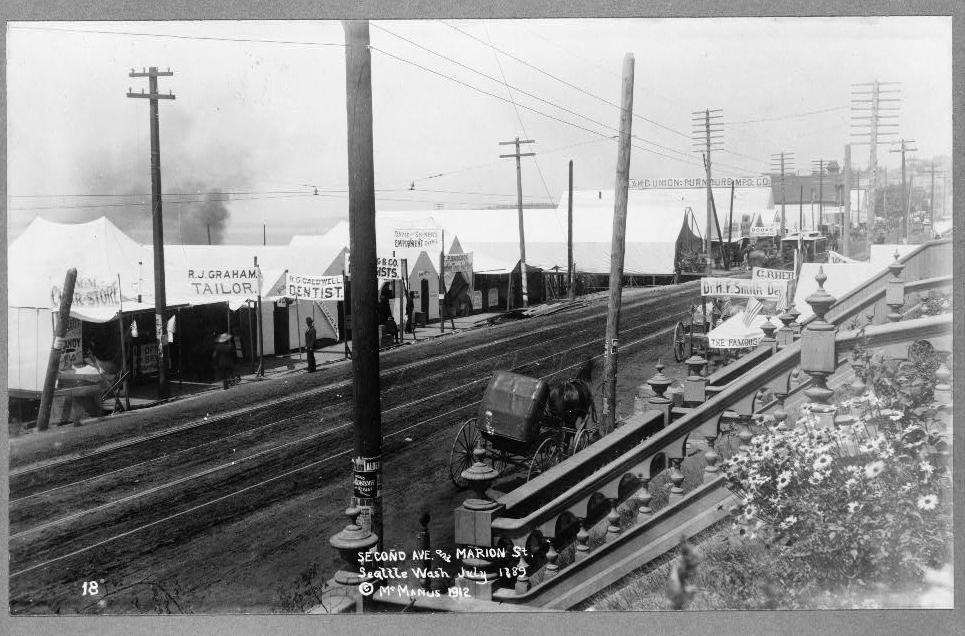
Second Ave. and Marion St., Seattle, Wash., July 1889

Seattle was incorporated as a town January 14, 1865. The incorporators were Charles C. Terry, Henry L. Yesler, David T. Denny, Charles Plummer and Hiram Burnett, manager of the largest Puget Sound lumber company predecessor to Pope & Talbot. That charter was voided January 18, 1867, in response to unrest. Seattle was re-incorporated as a city on December 2, 1869. At the times of incorporation, the population was approximately 350 and 1,000, respectively.

== Railroad rivalry and encroaching civilization ==
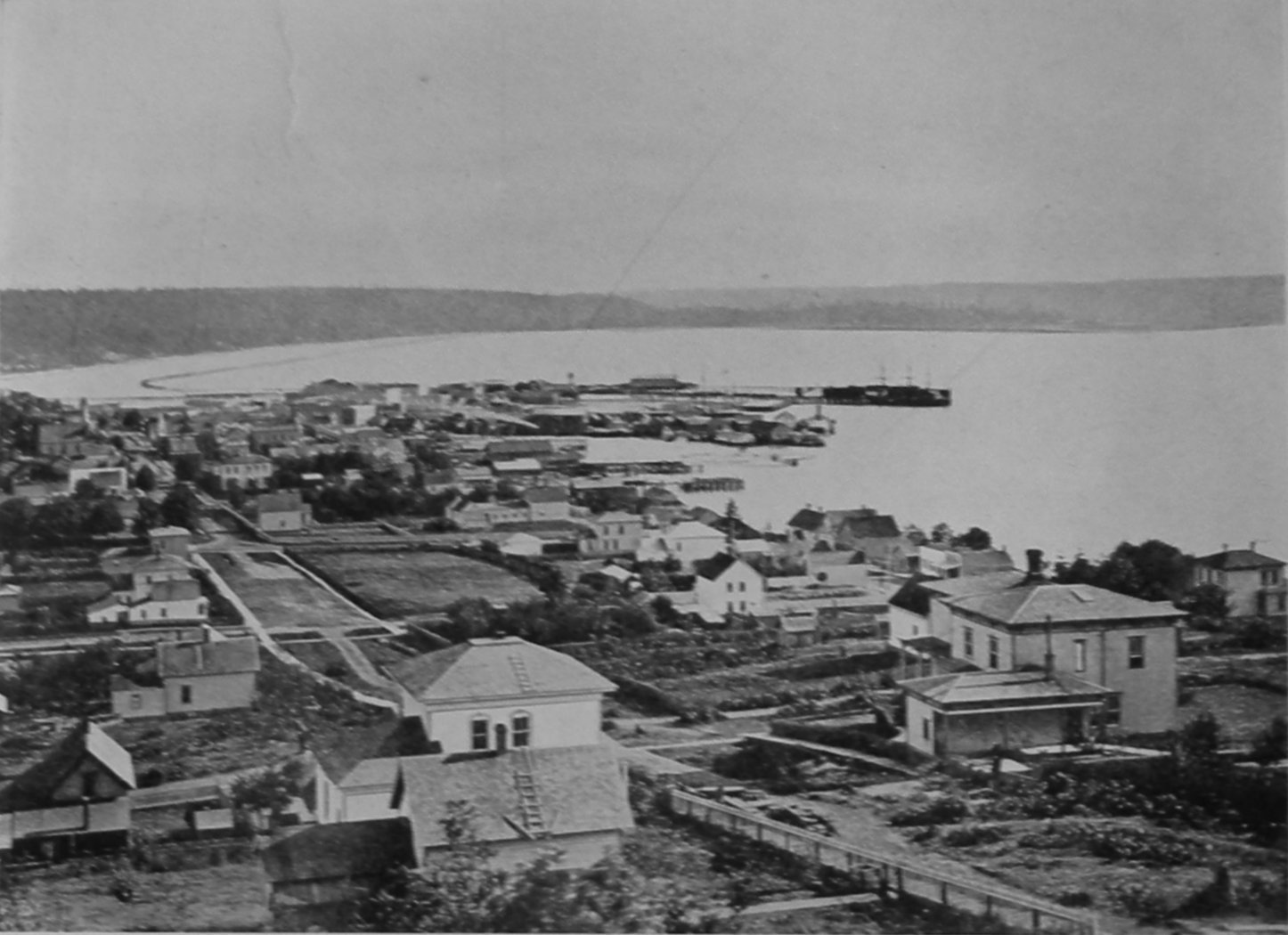
Seattle, looking south from Pine Street, 1880.

On July 14, 1873, the Northern Pacific Railway announced that they had chosen the then-small town of Tacoma over Seattle as the Western terminus of their transcontinental railroad. The railroad barons appear to have been gambling on the advantage they could gain from being able to buy up the land around their terminus cheaply instead of bringing the railroad into a more established Pacific port town.

Unwilling to be bypassed, the citizens of Seattle chartered their own railroad, the Seattle & Walla Walla, to link with the Union Pacific Railroad in eastern Washington. The S&WW never got beyond Renton, but that was far enough to connect with new coal mines, fueling industry in Seattle. The later Seattle, Lake Shore & Eastern Railway was only moderately more successful, although it did provide a route for logs to come to the city from as far away as Arlington, Washington, boost development of towns, and help Seattle hit the jackpot with the Northern Pacific. The Great Northern Railway chose Seattle as the terminus for its transcontinental road in 1893, winning Seattle a place in competition for freight traffic to California and across the Pacific. The Seattle, Lake Shore & Eastern was, over the years, incorporated into the Northern Pacific and then the Burlington Northern railways. The line was abandoned as a railroad in 1971 with the general decline in rail, and became in 1978 a foot and bicycle route renamed the Burke-Gilman Trail, then gradually greatly extended.

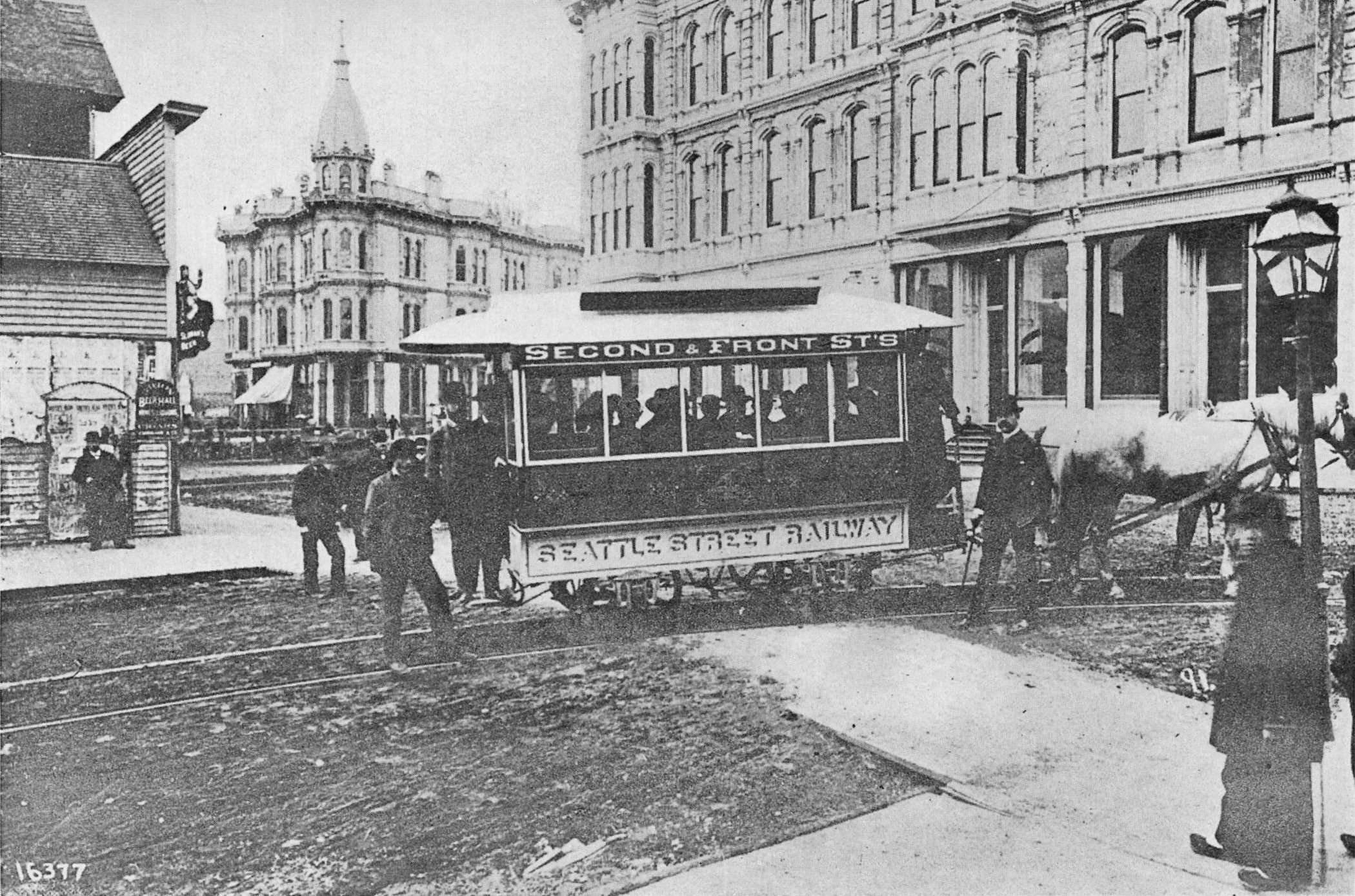
Seattle's first streetcar, 1884, at the corner of Occidental and Yesler.

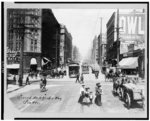
Second Av. & Yesler Way, Seattle, 1904

As has been remarked, Seattle in this era was an "open" and often relatively lawless town. Although it boasted two English-language newspapers (and, for a while, a third in Norwegian), and telephones had arrived in town, lynch law sometimes prevailed (there were at least four lynchings in 1882), schools barely operated, and indoor plumbing was a rare novelty. In the low mud flats where much of the city was built, sewage was almost as likely to come in on the tide as to flow away. Potholes in the street were so bad that legend has it there was at least one fatal drowning.

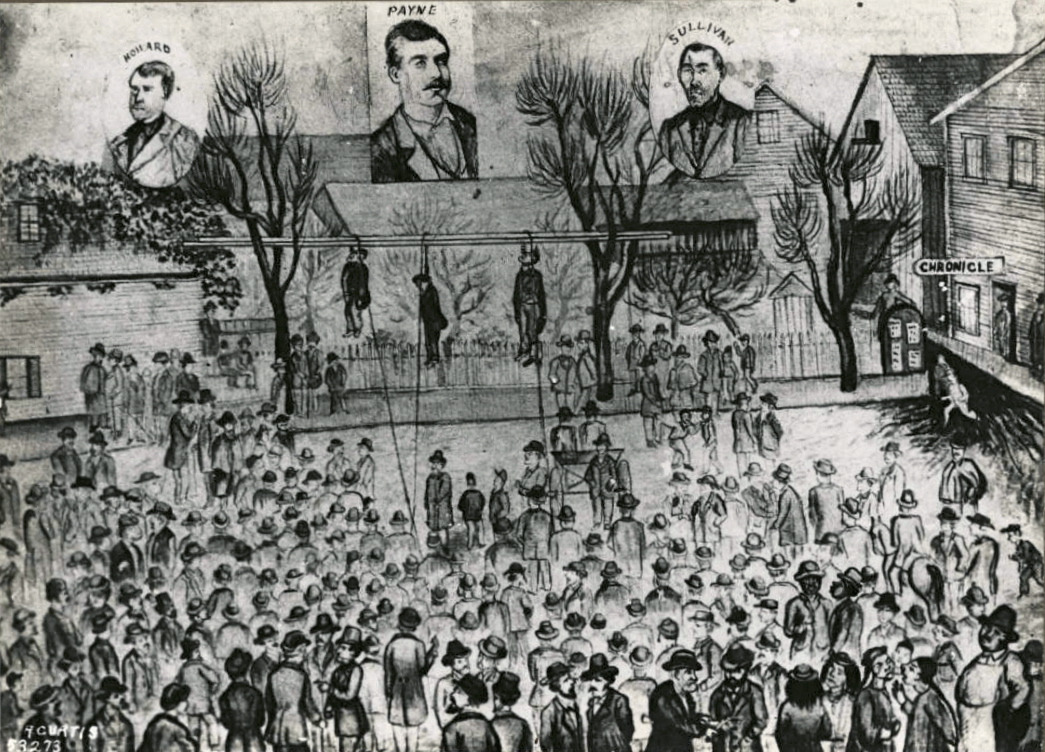
A lynching in 1882 drawn by A. W. Piper.

The 1882 lynchings are well described in Murray Morgan's book Skid Road. The events involved a mob defying an armed sheriff, successfully disarming the sheriff's deputies, and assaulting Judge Roger Sherman Greene, who attempted to slash the ropes by which the lynching victims were to be hanged. Judge Greene, while not doubting the actual guilt of the lynched men, was later to write that "the lynchers were co-criminal with the lynched".

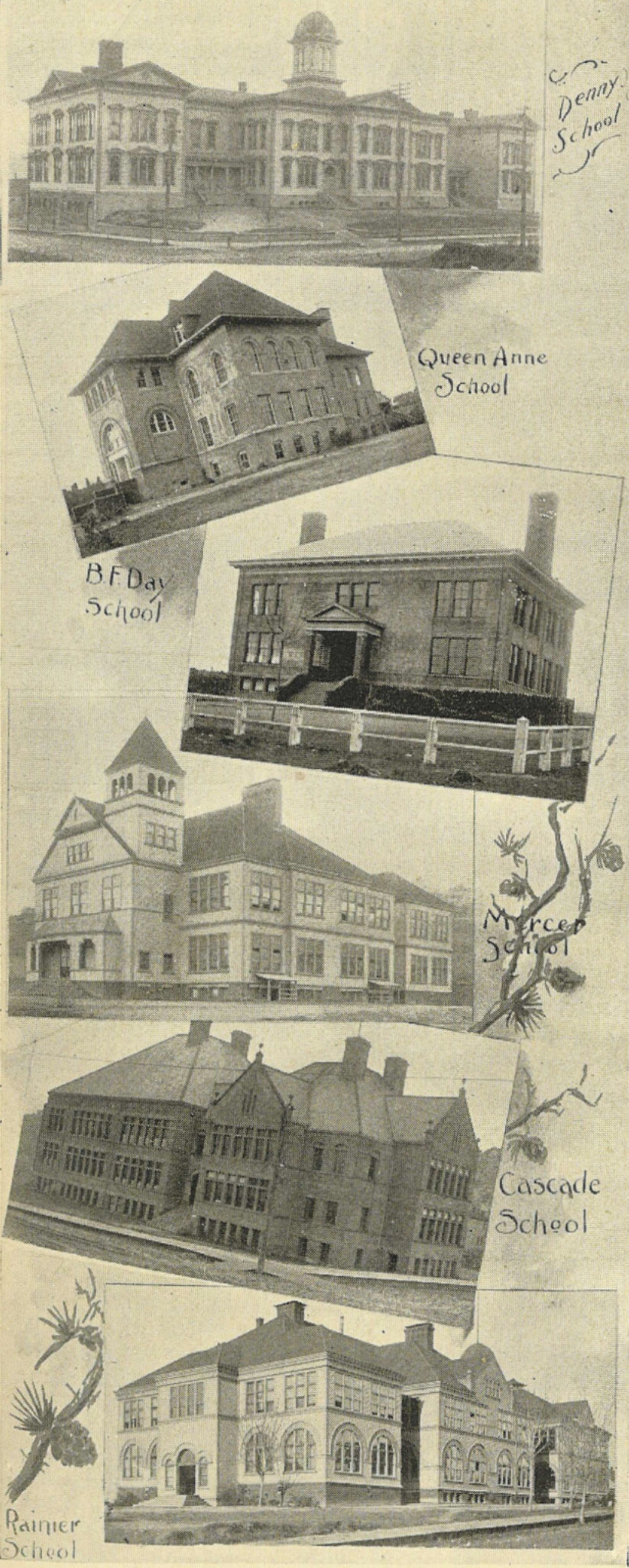
Some Seattle schools in 1900.

In an era during which the Washington Territory was one of the first parts of the U.S. to (briefly) allow women's suffrage, Seattle women attempted to counter these trends and to be a civilizing influence. On April 4, 1884, 15 Seattle women founded The Ladies Relief Society to address "the number of needy and suffering cases within the limits of the city". This eventually resulted in the founding of the Seattle Children's Home, still in operation today.

Other signs of encroaching civilization were the city's first bathtub with plumbing in 1870, and first streetcar in 1884, followed by a cable car from downtown over First Hill to Leschi Park in 1887. In 1885, the city passed an ordinance requiring attached sewer lines for all new residences. In 1886, the city got its first YMCA gymnasium, and in 1888 the exclusive Rainier Club was founded. On December 24, 1888, ferry service was inaugurated, connecting Seattle to West Seattle, near the location of the Denny Party's first attempt at settling at Alki and reviving that settlement. A year later, a bridge was built across Salmon Bay, providing a land route to the nearby town of Ballard, which after 17 years would be annexed to Seattle.

The relative fortunes of Seattle and Tacoma clearly show the nature of Seattle's growth. Though both Seattle and Tacoma grew at a rapid rate from 1880 to 1890, based on the strength of their timber industries, Seattle's growth as an exporter of services and manufactured goods continued for another two decades, while Tacoma's growth dropped almost to zero. The reason for this lies in Tacoma's nature as a company town and Seattle's successful avoidance of that condition.

Both Seattle and Tacoma in the 1880s were essentially lumber towns, built on the resulting export income. All over the Puget Sound there are communities that started with the same assets, timber and a port. However, Seattle's early lead with Yesler's mill and other enterprises meant that its economy was based on manufacturing as well as lumber, and was thus far more diversified than Tacoma's. The Northern Pacific Railway terminus only increased Tacoma's lumber trade instead of diversifying the economy. Meanwhile, Seattle became the hub for the region and the railroad had to come.

== Relations between whites and Chinese ==
Chinese first arrived in Seattle around 1860. The Northern Pacific Railway completed the project of laying tracks from Lake Superior to Tacoma, Washington, in 1883, leaving many Chinese laborers without employment. In 1883, Chinese laborers played a key role in the first effort at digging the Montlake Cut to connect Lake Union's Portage Bay to Lake Washington's Union Bay.

Seattle's Chinese district, located near the present day Occidental Park, was a mixed neighborhood of residences over stores, laundries, and other retail storefronts. In fall 1885, with a shortage of jobs in the West, many workers turned violently anti-Chinese, complaining of overly cheap labor competition. In the Pacific Northwest, this had the unusual character that the anti-Chinese mobs included significant numbers of the native Indians as well as European-Americans.

The first massacre of Chinese occurred at Rock Springs, Wyoming, September 2, 1885. On September 7, Chinese hop-pickers were massacred in the Squak valley near present-day Issaquah. Similar incidents occurred in the nearby mining camps at Coal Creek and Black Diamond. Many Chinese headed from these isolated rural areas into the cities, but it did them little good: on October 24, a mob burned a large portion of Seattle's Chinatown; on November 3, a mob of 300 expelled the Chinese in Tacoma (loading them into boxcars with surprisingly little actual violence) before moving on to force similar expulsions in smaller towns.

Violent opposition to the Chinese at this time was inseparable from labor union organizing. The pro-labor Seattle Call routinely described the Chinese in brutally racist terms; leading figures in the anti-Chinese movement included Knights of Labor organizer Dan Cronin and Seattle socialist agitator Mary Kenworthy; the utopian socialist George Venable Smith was also of this party. Nor did the Chinese have many strong defenders among the wealthier classes, who, however, mostly favored a more orderly departure of the Chinese to massacre and riot (the policy of Henry Yesler, who was serving as mayor at this time).

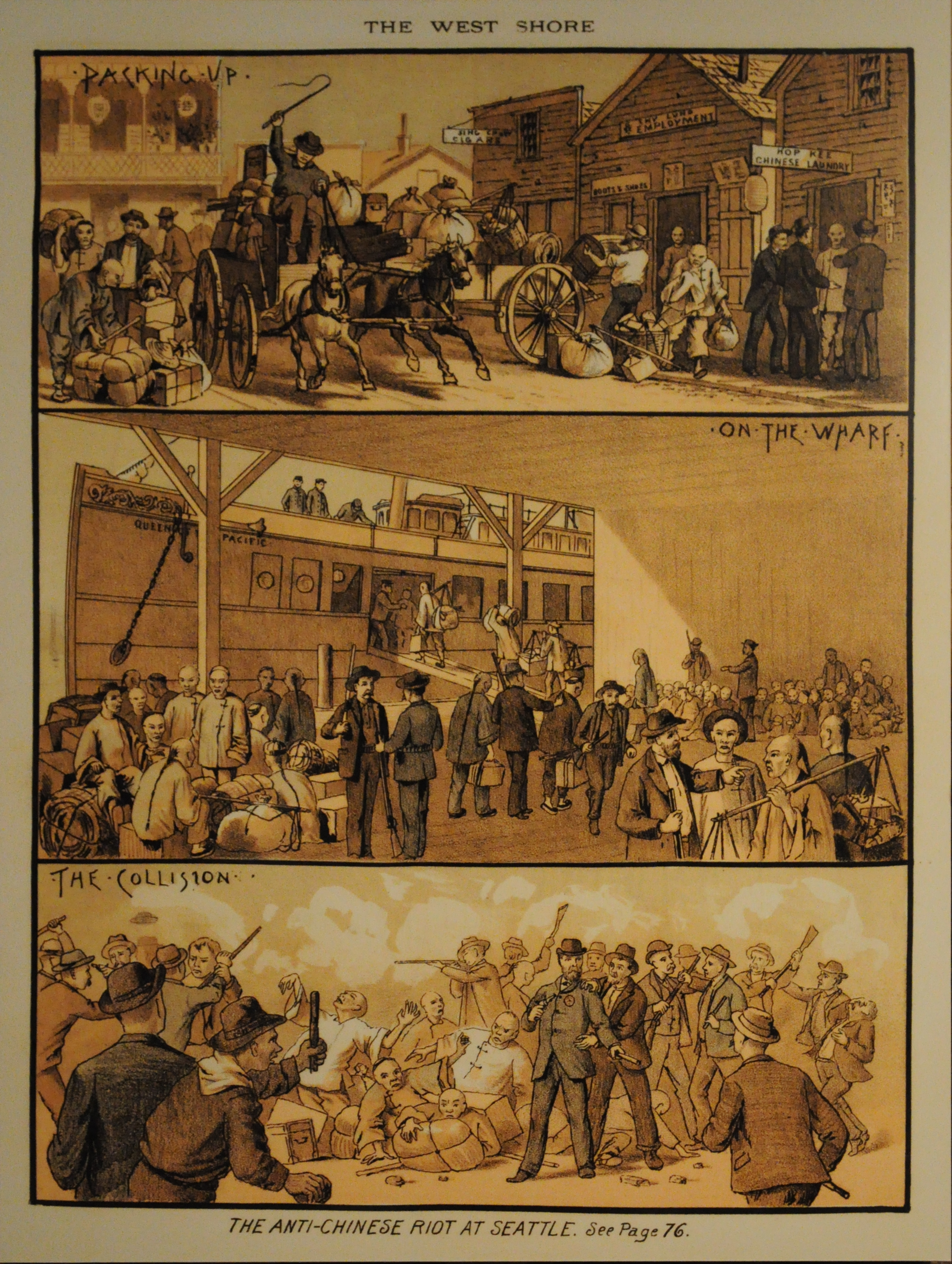
A contemporary depiction of events related to the anti-Chinese riot of 1886.

Among the few defenders of the rule of law were the Methodist Episcopal Ministers' Association and Judge Thomas Burke. Burke, generally a friend of labor, was nonetheless a stronger defender of the Constitution; he also spoke out that his fellow Irish should identify with the Chinese as fellow immigrants, a view which fell almost entirely on deaf ears.

On February 7, 1886, well-organized anti-Chinese "order committees" descended on Seattle's Chinatown, claiming to be health inspectors, declaring Chinese-occupied buildings to be unfit for habitation, rousting out the residents and herding them down to the harbor, where the Queen of the Pacific was docked. The police were willing to intervene only to the point of preventing the Chinese from being physically harmed, not to challenging the mob. It is quite probable that if ship's captain Jack Alexander had been willing simply to board the Chinese and take them away, the mob would entirely have ruled the day; however, he was not in the business of hauling non-paying passengers. The mob raised several hundred dollars, 86 Chinese were boarded, but this delay gave the mayor, Judge Burke, the U.S. Attorney, and others time both to rally the Home Guard and to serve Alexander with a writ of habeas corpus. A plot to deport the Chinese by rail was foiled when Sheriff McGraw threatened to prosecute the railroad superintendent for kidnapping.

The following day, Judge Greene made it clear that those Chinese who wished to remain would be protected, but by now, after what they had been through, all but sixteen preferred to leave. Alexander, by now, "was anxious to keep his operations strictly legal", and would board only the 196 passengers for which his ship was rated, slightly more than half of the Chinese who were ready to leave. Possibly due to poor communication, the anti-Chinese faction were unsatisfied; a resulting scuffle resulted in one dead and four others wounded among the anti-Chinese faction, and martial law was imposed. Ultimately, the bulk of the Chinese remained in Seattle, and the U.S. government "out of humane consideration and without reference to liability" paid out $276,619.15 to the Chinese government, but nothing to the victims themselves.

== The Great Seattle Fire ==
The early Seattle era came to a stunning halt with the Great Seattle Fire of June 6, 1889. It burned 29 city blocks, destroying most of the central business district; no one, however, perished in the flames, and the city quickly rebounded from the destruction. Thanks in part to credit arranged by Jacob Furth (as well as, according to Speidel, brothel-owner Lou Graham), Seattle rebuilt from the ashes with astounding rapidity. A new zoning code resulted in a downtown of brick and stone buildings, rather than wood. In the single year after the fire, the city grew from 25,000 to 40,000 inhabitants, largely because of the enormous number of construction jobs suddenly created.

== Labor history in 19th century Seattle ==
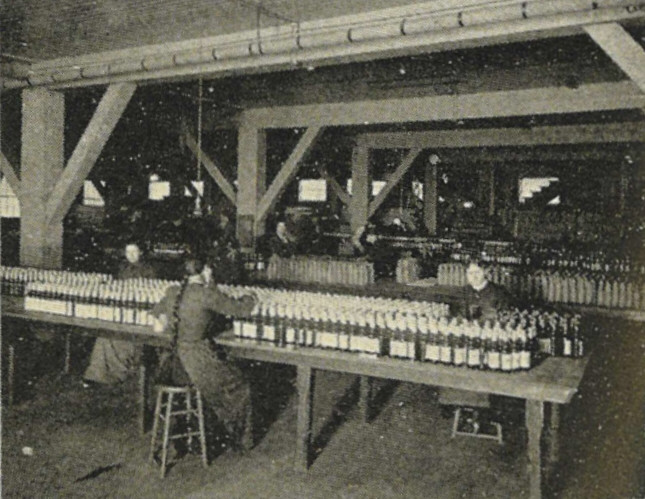
Tinfoiling Rainier Beer bottles, 1900.

The Pacific Northwest economy during the nineteenth century was heavily rooted in extractive industries, mainly logging. Still, Seattle was becoming a city, and union organizing arrived first in the form of a skilled craft union. In 1882, Seattle printers formed the Seattle Typographical Union Local 202. Dockworkers followed in 1886, cigarmakers in 1887, tailors in 1889, and both brewers and musicians in 1890. Even the newsboys unionized in 1892, followed by more organizing, mostly of craft unions.

According to various analyses and as evident through general readings in news coverage of the time, the history of labor in this period is inseparable from the issue of anti-Chinese vigilantism, as discussed above. A rough-and-ready approach to labor organizing was typical of the period, and there is no question that white Seattle-area laborers at this time saw cheap Chinese labor as their prime competition and strove to eliminate it by eliminating the Chinese immigrants.

== The Klondike Gold Rush ==
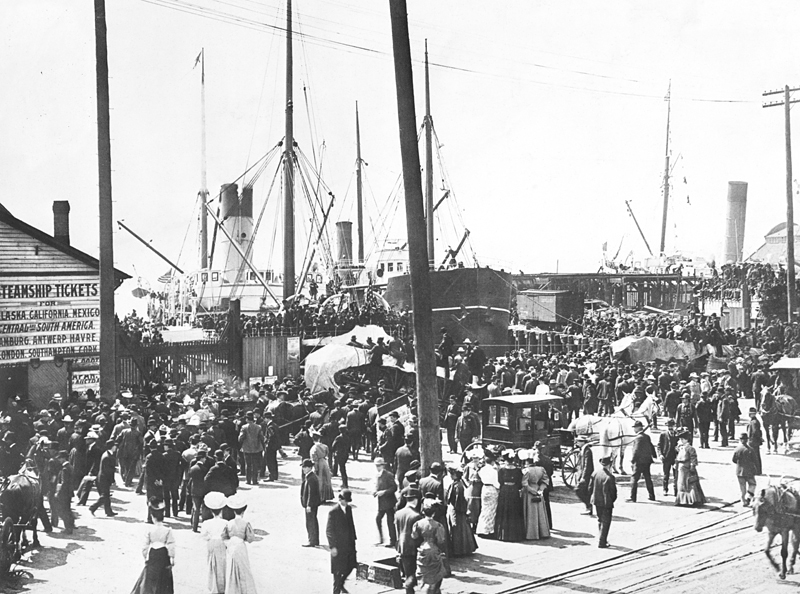
The Central Waterfront during the Gold Rush (1897)

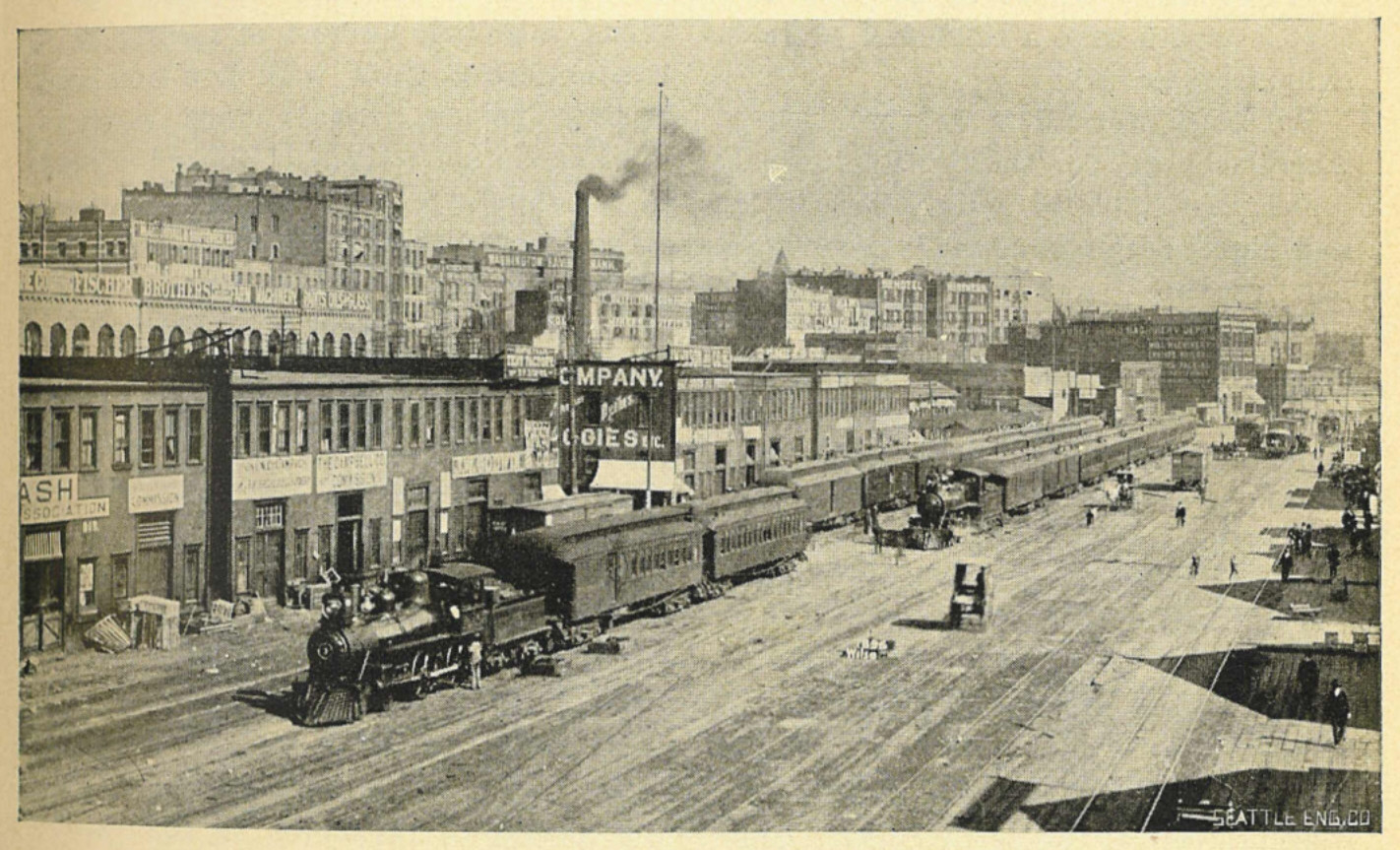
Railroad Avenue (now Alaskan Way) along the Seattle waterfront, 1900

Seattle, as well as the rest of the nation, was hard hit by the Panic of 1893 and, to a lesser extent, the Panic of 1896. Unlike many other cities, it soon found salvation in the form of becoming the main transportation and supply center for stampeders heading for the Klondike gold rush. When the steamer SS Portland arrived at Schwabacher's Wharf in Seattle July 17, 1897, the Seattle Post-Intelligencer scooped all other U.S. newspapers with the story that a "ton of gold" had arrived from Alaska. A publicity campaign engineered largely by Erastus Brainerd successfully convinced the world that Seattle was the place to be outfitted for the journey to Alaska, and Seattle became a household name, literally overnight. The miners mined the gold. Seattle mined the miners.

Seattle's relationship with Alaska during this period was generally one of rapacity. Besides the mining, on October 18, 1899, in Pioneer Square, a Chamber of Commerce "Committee of Fifteen", just back from a goodwill visit to Alaska, proudly unveiled a 60-foot (18 m) totem pole from Fort Tongass. The problem was, the pole had been stolen from the Tlingit village of Gaash on Cape Fox. A federal grand jury in Alaska indicted eight of Seattle's most prominent citizens for theft of government property. A nominal fine was assessed. The village was repaid when the original burned and the Chamber of Commerce commissioned a replacement—and paid twice. "Thank you for the check", wrote the Gaash village leaders. "That was payment for the first one. Send another check for the replacement".

== See also ==
- Duwamish tribe
- Mother Damnable
- Rock Springs massacre
- Timeline of Seattle, 19th century

== Notes and references ==
Much of the content of this page is from "Seattle: Booms and Busts", by Emmett Shear; Shear has granted blanket permission for material from that paper to be reused in Wikipedia.

== Bibliography ==
- Anderson, Ross; Green, Sara Jean (May 27, 2001). "A culture slips away". Seattle History: 150 Years: Seattle By and By. The Seattle Times. p. 1. Archived from the original on May 7, 2006.
  and Anderson, Ross; Green, Sara Jean (May 27, 2001). "The settlers saw trees, endless trees. The natives saw the spaces between the trees". Seattle History: 150 Years: Seattle By and By. The Seattle Times. p. 2. Archived from the original on May 18, 2006.
- Boyd, Robert (1999). The Coming of the Spirit of Pestilence: Introduced Infectious Diseases and Population Decline Among Northwest Coast Indians, 1774-1874. Seattle and Vancouver: University of Washington Press and University of British Columbia Press. ISBN 0-295-97837-6. (alk. paper).
- Cline, Scott (c. 2006). "Annexed Cities (9100)". Seattle Municipal Archives Record Descriptions (second ed.). Archived from the original on September 26, 2007. A Guide To The Archives Of The City Of Seattle
- Dailey, Tom. "Duwamish-Seattle". coastsalishmap.org.
  Page links to Village Descriptions Duwamish-Seattle section.
  Dailey referenced "Puget Sound Geography" by T. T. Waterman. Washington DC: National Anthropological Archives, mss. [n.d.] [ref. 2];
  Duwamish et al. vs. United States of America, F-275. Washington DC: US Court of Claims, 1927. [ref. 5];
  "Indian Lake Washington" by David Buerge in the Seattle Weekly, August 1–7, 1984 [ref. 8];
  "Seattle Before Seattle" by David Buerge in the Seattle Weekly, December 17–23, 1980. [ref. 9];
  The Puyallup-Nisqually by Marian W. Smith. New York: Columbia University Press, 1940. [ref. 10].
  Recommended start is "Coast Salish Villages of Puget Sound"
- "Decatur". Dictionary of American Naval Fighting Ships. Department of the Navy, Navy Historical Center. Archived from the original on August 20, 2006.
- Dorpat, Paul (1994) [1984]. "42". Seattle, now & then (2nd ed.). Seattle: Tartu Publications. ISBN 0-9614357-0-4. (pbk.).
  2d edition of vol. I of III
- Lange, Greg (October 15, 2000). "Seattle and King County's First White Settlers". HistoryLink.org Essay 1660.
- Lange, Greg (February 4, 2003) [December 8, 2000]. "Smallpox Epidemic of 1862 among Northwest Coast and Puget Sound Indians". HistoryLink.org Essay 5171.
  Lange referenced a very extensive list.
  Summary article
  - Lange, Greg (December 8, 2000). "Smallpox kills 14,000 Northwest Coast Indians from April to December 1862". HistoryLink.org Essay 3176.
    Lange referenced Lange, "Smallpox Epidemic of 1862 among Northwest Coast and Puget Sound Indians" , HistoryLink.org Online Encyclopedia of Washington State History. Accessed December 8, 2000.
- Morgan, Murray (1951). Skid Road: Seattle -- Her first hundred years. revised. New York: Ballantine Books. ISBN 0-295-95846-4. ;
- Morgan, Murray (1982) [1951]. Skid Road: an Informal Portrait of Seattle (revised and updated, first illustrated ed.). Seattle and London: University of Washington Press. ISBN 0-295-95846-4.
- "The people and their land". Puget Sound Native Art and Culture. Seattle Art Museum. July 4, 2003.
- Phelps, Myra L. (1978). Public works in Seattle. Seattle: Seattle Engineering Department. ISBN 0-9601928-1-6.
- Sale, Roger (1976). Seattle: Past To Present. Seattle and London: University of Washington Press. ISBN 029595521X.
- Speidel, William C. ("Bill") (1978). Doc Maynard: the man who invented Seattle. Seattle: Nettle Creek Publishing Company. pp. 196–197, 200. ISBN 0-914890-02-6.
  Speidel provides a substantial bibliography with extensive primary sources.
- Speidel, William C. ("Bill") (1967). Sons of the profits; or, There's no business like grow business: the Seattle story, 1851-1901. Seattle: Nettle Creek Publishing Company. pp. 196–197, 200. ISBN 0-914890-00-X.
  Speidel provides a substantial bibliography with extensive primary sources.
- Speidel, William C. ("Bill") (1989). Through the Eye of the Needle. Seattle: Nettle Creek Publishing Company. ISBN 0-914890-04-2..
- Talbert, Paul. "SkEba'kst: The Lake People and Seward Park". The History of Seward Park. SewardPark.org. Archived from the original on December 14, 2005.
- Wilma, David (January 24, 2001). "Seattle pioneers petition against a reservation on the Black River for the Duwamish tribe in 1866". HistoryLink.org Essay 2955.
  Wilma referenced "Petition: To the Honorable Arthur A. Denny, Delegate to Congress from Washington Territory," n.d., National Archives Roll 909, "Letters Received by the Office of Indian Affairs, 1824-81";
  Pioneer Association of the State of Washington, "A Petition to Support Recognition of The Duwamish Indians as a 'Tribe', June 18, 1988, in possession of Ken Tollefson, Seattle, Washington.
- Wilma, David (January 1, 2000). "Stolen totem pole unveiled in Seattle's Pioneer Square on October 18, 1899". HistoryLink.org Essay 2076. Klondike Gold Rush National Historical Park, Seattle Unit.
  Wilam referenced Paul Dorpat, Seattle Now and Then Vol. 2 (Seattle: Tartu Publications, 1984), 32-35;
  Joseph H. Wherry, The Totem Pole Indians, (New York: Wilfred Funk, Inc., 1964), 64, 89;
  William C. Speidel, Sons of the Profits (Seattle: Nettle Creek Publishing Co., 1967), 329-331;
  Viola Garfield, Seattle's Totem Poles (Bellevue, WA: Thistle Press, 1996), 9;
  Seattle Department of Parks and Recreation, Data on the History of Seattle Park System Vol. 4 (Seattle: Seattle Parks Department, 1978);
  James William Clise, "Personal Memoirs 1855-1935" Mimeograph, Altadena, California, 1935, Seattle Public Library.
