= Thomas Phelps =

United States Navy admiral (1822–1901)

Thomas Stowell Phelps
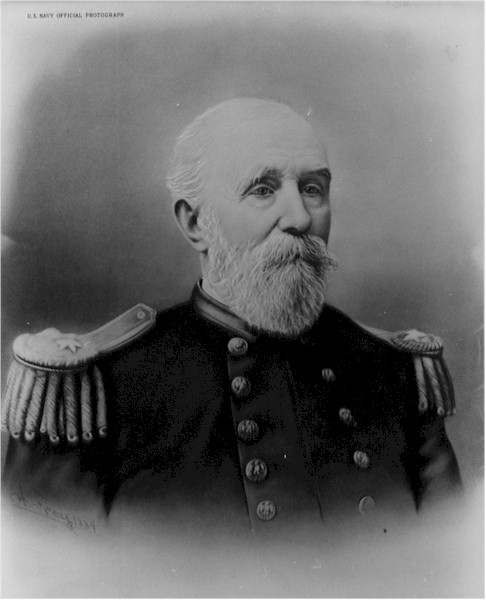
- Rear Admiral Phelps
- Born: November 2, 1822; Buckfield, Maine
- Died: January 10, 1901 (aged 78); New York City
- Burial place: Arlington National Cemetery
- Spouse: Margaret Riché Levy (1848–1901)
- Military career
- Allegiance: United States of America
- Branch: United States Navy
- Service years: 1840–1884
- Rank: Rear Admiral
- Commands: USS Corwin; USS Juniata
- Conflicts: Puget Sound War: • Battle of Seattle; American Civil War: • Second Battle of Fort Fisher • Battle of West Point

Thomas Stowell Phelps (November 2, 1822 – January 10, 1901) was an officer in the United States Navy. He served in the United States Navy from 1840 to 1884, attaining the rank of Captain in 1871 and Rear Admiral in 1884. He served in the Mediterranean, the Atlantic, and the Pacific, and commanded the sloop Juniata during the critical battle to capture Fort Fisher in January 1865.

== Early life ==
Phelps was born in Buckfield, Maine on November 2, 1822. He was a son of Stephen Phelps and Elizabeth (née Stowell) Phelps (1785–1832), who was born, and died, in South Paris, Maine. His paternal grandfather, Henry Phelps of Sutton, Massachusetts, was a Corporal of Minutemen in 1775 and a Private in the Massachusetts Militia during the Revolutionary War from 1776 to 1777.

He joined the Navy in 1840 and graduated from the U.S. Naval Academy at Annapolis in 1846.

== Career ==
Phelps served on the Labrador Coast and then with the Mediterranean Squadron from March 1840 to September 1843. He then served aboard the sloop Boston in the Brazil Squadron. He was assigned to the United States Naval Academy in October 1843 and graduated in February 1846.

He rejoined Boston for duty as a member of the Gulf Squadron from October 1846 through February 1847, and then served aboard the Polk from February to May 1847. After duty aboard the Independence, the flagship of the Mediterranean Squadron from June 1849 through December 1850, he transferred to the Constitution and served in the Mediterranean Squadron from December 1850 to February 1851. He then served in the United States Coast Survey from May 1851 until August 1852.

He served in the Indian War in Washington Territory. While serving on the Decatur, he was active at the Battle of Seattle which took place on 26 January 1856. In 1882, he wrote Reminiscences of Seattle: Washington Territory and the U. S. Sloop-of-War "Decatur" During the Indian War of 1855–56

=== Action during Civil War ===
When the American Civil War began, Confederate forces destroyed or sabotaged many navigational aids in the Potomac River. Phelps was called on to use his experience conducting coastal surveys to chart the Potomac River. He was part of the expedition sent to relieve Fort Sumter and assisted in secretly surveying and marking the Confederate coast. He later conducted a secret survey of Virginia coastal waters and was recognized by the Secretary of the Navy for his efforts.

In September 1861, he was transferred to command the steamer Corwin and surveyed and buoyed Hatteras Inlet in preparation for Union incursions into the inlets and rivers, along with other coastal inlets. His ship engaged the Confederate gunboat CSS Curlew in Hatteras Inlet on 14 November 1861, and skirmished with gunboats in Pamlico Sound.

He engaged the Yorktown and Gloucester Point batteries, sunk two Confederate vessels, and prevented Confederate forces from destroying White House Bridge during April and May 1862. Phelps was promoted to lieutenant commander in July 1862 and was charged with surveying and charting coastal waters for blockades and navigational purposes. He commanded the sloop Juniata during the successful attack on Fort Fisher, which had been protecting blockade runners' vital access to the Confederate port at Wilmington, North Carolina until it was captured by the Union on 15 January 1865. This was the last supply route open to Robert E. Lee's Army of Northern Virginia.

During the Battle of West Point on April 16, 1865, in West Point, Georgia, he prevented a large force of Confederate forces from joining with their main army. In 1865, he was commissioned commander, promoted to captain in 1871, to commodore in 1879, and rear admiral in 1884, and retired in 1885.

== Personal life ==
On January 25, 1848, Phelps was married to Margaret Riché Levy (1830–1901) in Lake Drummond, North Carolina. Together, they were the parents of one son and two daughters:

- Thomas Stowell Phelps, Jr. (1848–1915), who also attained the rank of Rear Admiral.
- Margaret Jane Phelps (1854–1946), who married Rear Admiral James Dexter Adams in 1873.
- Edmonia Taylor Phelps (1858–1909), who married Theodorus B. M. Mason, the founder and first head of the Office of Naval Intelligence.

Phelps died in the Naval Hospital in New York City on 10 January 1901. Mother, father and son are buried in adjacent plots in Arlington National Cemetery (Section 1 grave 504).

=== Honors and legacy ===
The destroyer USS Phelps (DD-360) was named for him.
