= David Denny =

American judge (1832–1903

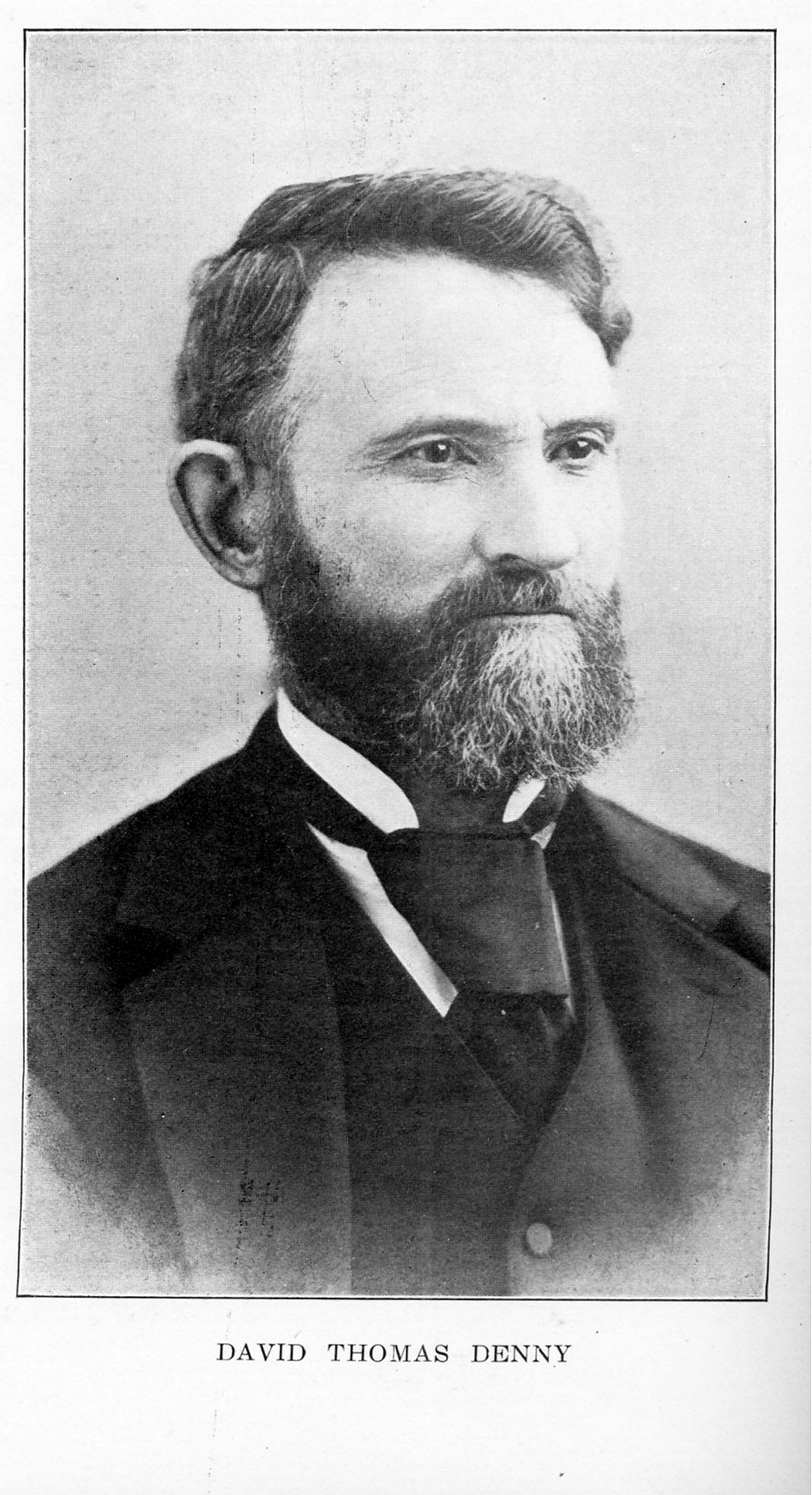
Denny circa 1875

David Thomas Denny (March 17, 1832 – November 25, 1903) was a member of the Denny Party, who are generally collectively credited as the founders of Seattle, Washington, United States. Though he ultimately underwent bankruptcy, he was a significant contributor to the shape of the city. Roger Sale, in his book Seattle, Past to Present, described him as having been "the pioneer to turn to if one had a plan that would be 'good for Seattle', and one needed a respectable tone and a willing investor."

== Early life and journey to the Oregon Country ==
Denny was born in Putnam County, Illinois. With what would become known as the Denny Party—named after Denny's older brother Arthur Denny—he traveled west by covered wagon in 1851 to Oregon. Along with John Low and Lee Terry, he traveled by boat to the future site of Seattle, arriving September 25, 1851. As Low went to reconnoiter with the rest of the group, and Lee Terry headed south on Puget Sound in search of tools, David Denny—too young at this time to stake a land claim in his own right—was briefly left as the sole member of the group at Alki in what is now West Seattle.

== Marriage to Louisa Boren ==
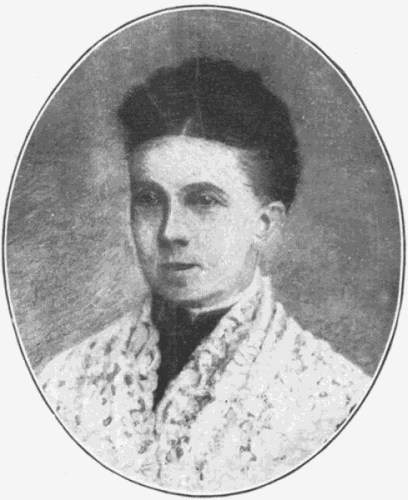
Louisa Boren, wife of Denny.

On January 23, 1853, Denny married his sister-in-law Louisa Boren, also a member of the Denny Party, in a civil ceremony performed by "Doc" Maynard, the city's first non-Indian wedding; they were to have eight children, including Emily Inez Denny. He proved to be adept at languages, and (unlike some of the settlers) maintained generally good relations with the natives of the area.

== 1853 land claim ==
The Dennys' 1853 land claim—640 acres (2.6 km^{2}), standard for a married couple—ran from what is now the Seattle Center grounds (the area where they first settled) east to South Lake Union; its south boundary was present-day Denny Way. In 1882, the Lake Union and Lumber Company established a sawmill (the city's largest) on this land near the southwest corner of Lake Union; Denny bought the mill in 1884, renaming it the Western Mill. The following year, he cut a weir from Portage Bay at the northeast corner of the lake to Lake Washington. This allowed logs to be floated from that larger lake to Lake Union, so that the entire area of Lake Washington became a catchment for his mill. Denny operated the Western Mill until 1895; his employees and their families were among the first settlers of the South Lake Union area.

Seattle's first cemetery (1861) was on Denny's land. In 1876, the bodies were relocated to Washelli Cemetery, which is off of Aurora Avenue North in north Seattle and part of the Evergreen-Washelli Cemetery. The Dennys donated what became Lake View Cemetery, on Seattle's Capitol Hill, and the Dennys donated the more central 5-acre (20,000 m^{2}) tract as the site of the city's first park, now called Denny Park in their honor. Another donation to the city became the site of the Civic Auditorium (later remodeled as the Opera House and now McCaw Hall) and several other buildings that now form part of Seattle Center.

== Public offices ==
Active in public life, Denny served as probate judge, King County Commissioner, a member of the Seattle City Council, a director of the Seattle School District, and regent of the Territorial University of Washington, predecessor to the University of Washington. He was an advocate of woman suffrage (which was won in Washington the 1880s, though later rescinded) and the temperance movement, and opposed the Anti-Chinese movement in the mid-1880s.

== Business success ==
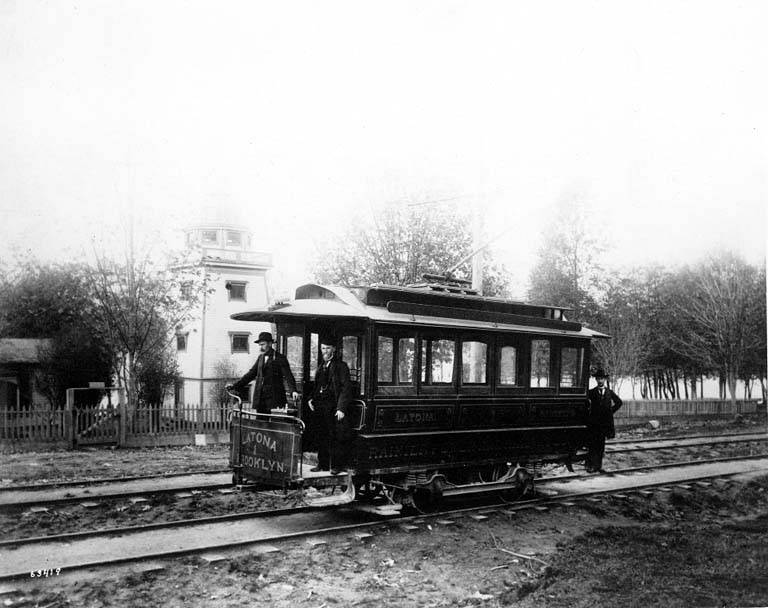
Rainier Power and Railway Company streetcar Number 1, with Denny second from left.

In the early 1880s, Denny was one of Seattle's wealthiest citizens, his fortune estimated at US$3 million. His interests went well beyond his original land claim and Lake Union: he farmed in the Duwamish River valley and platted Seattle neighborhoods, including the Ravenna Park area. In 1890, he moved his family from an already large home at Dexter and Republican Streets to a mansion at the foot of Queen Anne Hill, and the next year he founded the Rainier Power and Railway Company, providing the first streetcar service from Downtown to the University District. The streetcar line ran from 3rd Avenue and Yesler Way in today's Pioneer Square neighborhood downtown to NE 55 Street and 22nd Avenue NE (northeast of the University), and included the purpose-built Latona Bridge, dedicated July 1, 1891, replaced in 1919 by the present day University Bridge.

== Bankruptcy ==
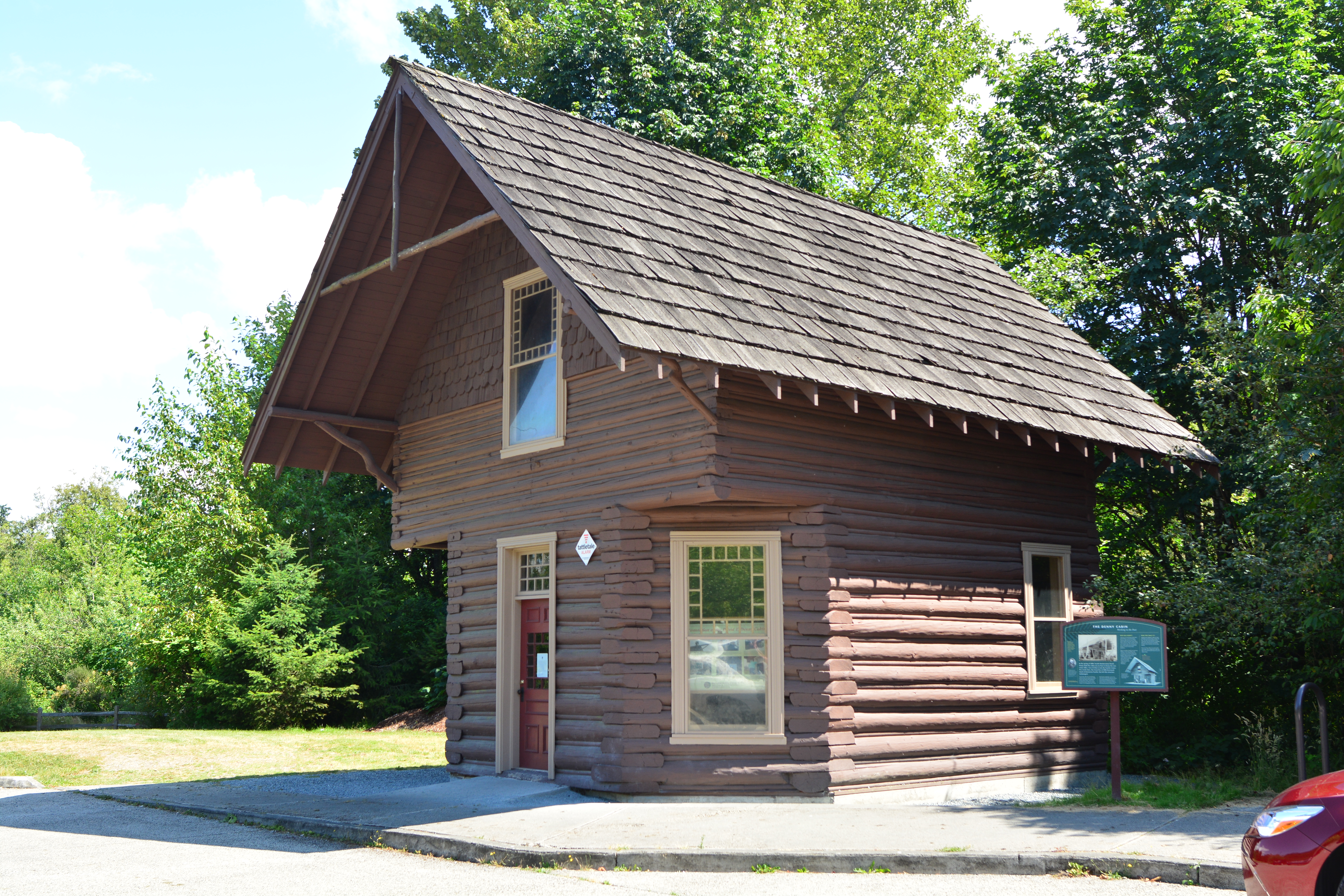
Denny's one-time real estate office, repeatedly moved and much restored, now sits at the north entrance to West Hylebos Wetlands Park, Federal Way, Washington.

But his fall was as dramatic as his rise: in the years from 1888 to 1895, two of David and Louisa Denny's children died, and they suffered such a major financial reversal in the Panic of 1893 that they lost everything, including their nearly new mansion. Adding insult to injury, among the creditors who forced him into bankruptcy was Dexter Horton and Company, the bank where his brother Arthur was senior vice president. Their only salvation was that in their years of wealth, they had given their daughter Emily a tract of land in Licton Springs (in what is now northern Seattle), to which they now retreated.

== Last years ==
In 1899, at the age of 67, Denny took a job overseeing improvements on the Snoqualmie Pass road (the route now taken by Interstate 90), during which he sustained an injury when an inattentive worker cut his head with a careless backswing of his ax. He bandaged his own wound and returned to work. The next year he was in the same area at Keechelus Lake helping a mining company look for gold. But he lived only a few years longer, and died at Licton Springs in 1903. His wife, Louisa Boren Denny, lived until 1916. They are both buried at what is now the Evergreen Washelli cemetery near Licton Springs, land that they once owned and lost in the bankruptcy.

== Legacy ==
The named legacy of David Denny and Louisa Boren includes two schools in the Seattle Public Schools school district: Denny International Middle School and K-5 STEM @ Boren (formerly Louisa Boren Middle School), both located in the West Seattle district.
