= Mother Damnable =

American brothel madam

Mary Ann Conklin, also known as Mother Damnable and Madame Damnable (c. 1821–1873) was an American madam who ran Seattle's first brothel, the Felker House, a major means of funneling money from sailors and lumbermen into local businesses. The name by which she is most widely known derives not from the nature of her business, but from her legendarily unrestrained language, learned at sea and from her customers. It was said that she swore expertly in Chinese, English, French, German, Portuguese, and Spanish.

== Biography ==
Born Mary Ann Boyer in about 1821 in Pennsylvania, she met and may have married the captain of a whaling ship, David W. "Bull" Conklin, in 1851. In 1853, the captain abandoned her in Port Townsend, Washington, and sailed away to Alaska. She moved to Seattle which at the time was one of several small settlements competing for Puget Sound business.

There, she began to manage Felker House for Captain Leonard Felker. In this two-story building, on land purchased from her sometime-ally Doc Maynard, she ran an efficient hotel with clean sheets, good food, and a brothel upstairs. She rented out unused rooms during the day, including the rooms for the Territorial Court.

At the time of the Battle of Seattle (January 26, 1856), sailors from the sloop-of-war U.S.S. Decatur wanted to improve Seattle's defenses by building a road that passed her hotel and incidentally threatened the bushes that assured the discretion of her well-to-do customers. According to memoirs of the sloop's navigator (later Rear-Admiral) Thomas Stowell Phelps:

...the moment our men appeared upon the scene, with three dogs at her heels, and an apron filled with rocks, this termagant would come tearing from the house, and the way stones, oaths, and curses flew was something fearful to contemplate, and, charging like a fury, with the dogs wild to flesh their teeth in the detested invaders, the division invariably gave way before the storm, fleeing, officers and all, as if old Satan himself was after them.

—

== Urban legend ==
After her death in 1873, her remains were initially buried in the Seattle Cemetery and moved in 1884, when that site was made into Denny Park. According to legend, when her coffin was dug up, it was unreasonably heavy, so the workers opened it. The legend states that her body had turned to stone. Her gravestone, at Lake View Cemetery on Seattle's Capitol Hill, incorrectly lists her death as occurring in 1887 (three years after the grave was moved.)
