= David Maynard =

David Maynard may refer to:

- David Maynard, programmer with Electronic Arts
- David Swinson Maynard (1808–1873), American pioneer, doctor, and businessman
