= St. John's Lodge No. 9 =

Masonic lodge in Seattle, Washington

St. John's Lodge No. 9 is a Masonic lodge in Seattle, Washington, chartered in 1860. It is the oldest Masonic lodge in Seattle.

== History ==
The lodge's early membership included several figures prominent in Seattle's founding, including David "Doc" Maynard, Dexter Horton, Daniel Bagley, and Guy Phinney. Daniel Bagley, a Master Mason, received full Masonic honors from the lodge at his death in 1905.

In 1872, the lodge acquired land from Doc Maynard on Capitol Hill to establish the Seattle Masonic Cemetery, which was renamed Lake View Cemetery in 1890 and remains in operation as one of Seattle's oldest surviving cemeteries.

Seattle's first Masonic temple, built in 1890 at the corner of 2nd Avenue and Pike Street, was designed by architect William E. Boone.

== Sources ==
A two-volume privately printed lodge history, History of St. John's Lodge No. 9, F. & A. M. of Seattle, Washington, was published by the lodge and documents its internal records in greater detail than is publicly available elsewhere.
