= Emily Inez Denny =

American painter

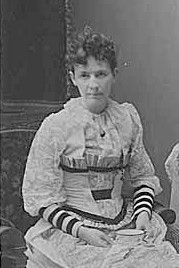
Emily Inez Denny

Emily Inez Denny (December 23, 1853 - August 23, 1918) was a painter who drew scenes from Seattle's early history, along with landscapes of the Puget Sound region. Her parents were Seattle pioneers David Denny (1832-1903) and Louisa Boren Denny (1827-1916). (Louisa Boren Denny was also technically her aunt, since her parents were stepsiblings.) Her parents came to Seattle from Cherry Grove, Illinois over the Oregon Trail. Emily had a sister, Abbie Denny Lindsley (1858-1915), and two brothers, D.T. Denny and Victor Denny.

She survived the Battle of Seattle in 1856 and later painted the event as well as many landscapes and nature scenes from the region. The Museum of History & Industry (MOHAI) in Seattle holds the largest collection of her works. This museum valued one of her most popular untitled works, dated 1888, at $42,500 in July 2008. In 1909 she wrote a book called Blazing the Way, which described the early history of Seattle and the Puget Sound region.

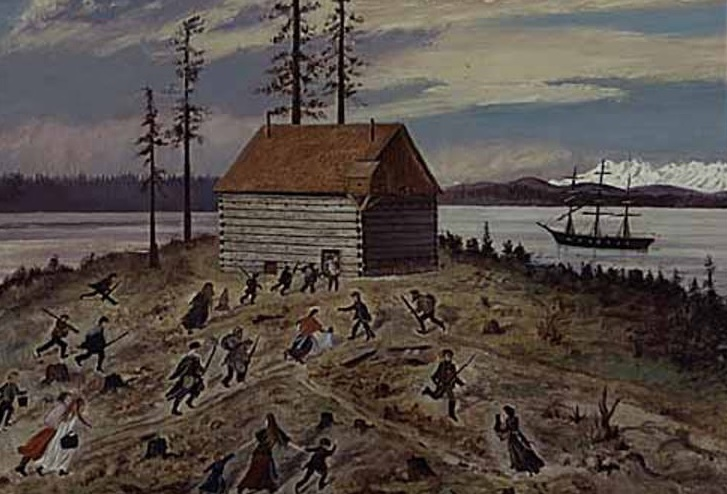
"Battle of Seattle", by Emily Inez Denny

In 2007, her painting "Panoramic View of the Olympic Mountains" was displayed for the first time in 121 years, at the Museum of History and Industry.

In 1899, Inez wrote, "Blazing the Way," an autobiographical sketch which included the story of her pioneer parents and early events in Seattle. She wrote, "By thrift and enterprise they attained independence, and... helped to lay the foundations of many institutions and enterprises of which the commonwealth is now justly proud".

== Works ==
- Denny, Emily Inez (2012) [1909]. Blazing The Way: True Stories, Songs and Sketches of Puget Sound. Project Gutenberg. OCLC 914181918.
