= USS Phelps =

Porter-class destroyer

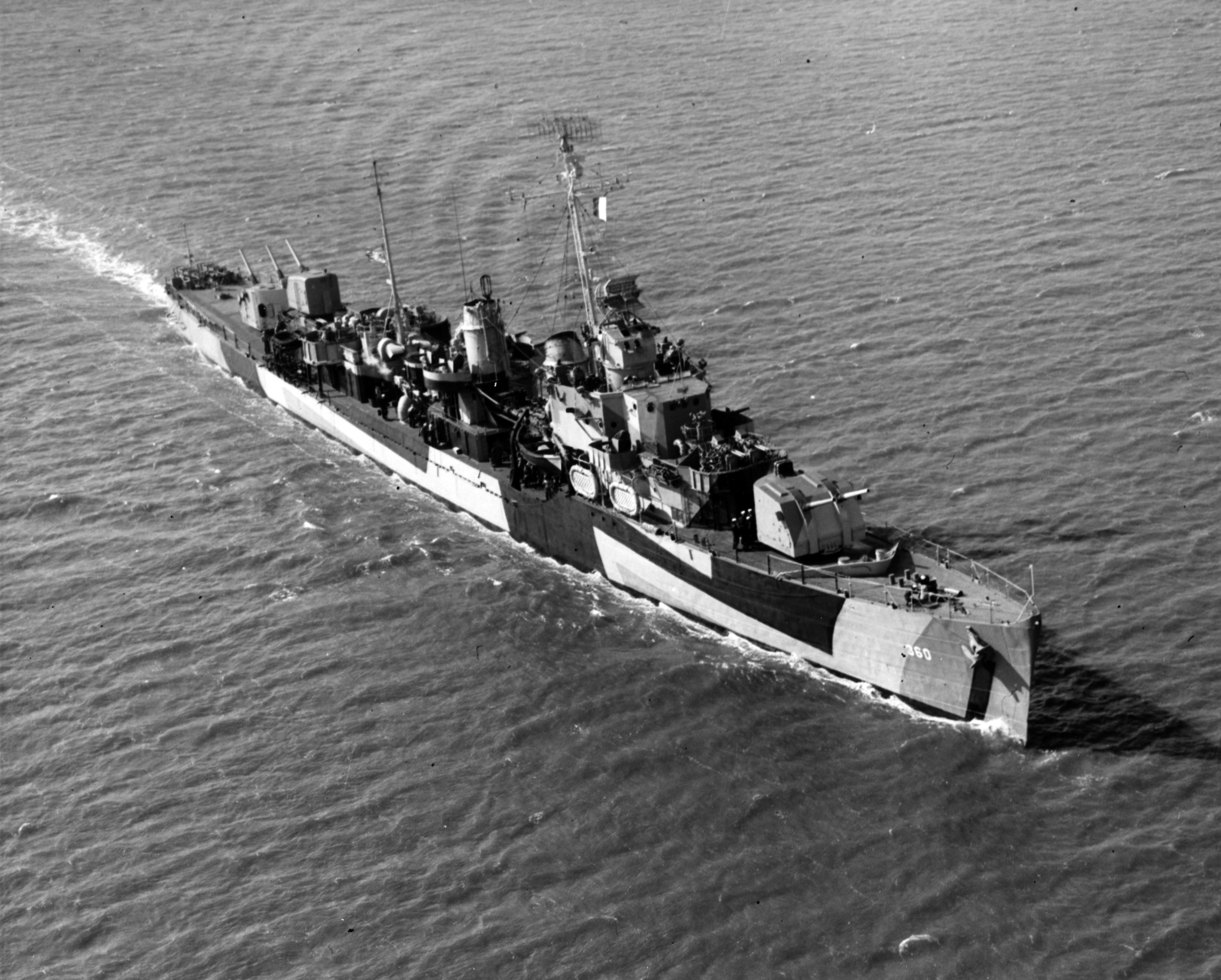
- USS Phelps c. November 1944

History

United States
- Namesake: Thomas Stowell Phelps
- Builder: Bethlehem Shipbuilding Corporation's Fore River Shipyard, Quincy, Massachusetts
- Laid down: 2 January 1934
- Launched: 18 July 1935
- Sponsored by: Mrs. Richard A. Kearny
- Commissioned: 26 February 1936
- Decommissioned: 6 November 1945
- Stricken: 28 January 1947
- Honors and awards: 12 × battle stars
- Fate: Sold 10 August 1947, scrapped

General characteristics
- Class & type: Porter-class destroyer
- Displacement: 1,805 tons
- Length: 380 ft 6 in (115.98 m)
- Beam: 36 ft 2 in (11.02 m)
- Draught: 10 ft 3 in (3.12 m)
- Speed: 37 knots (69 km/h)
- Complement: 276
- Armament: As built: 1 × Mk35 Gun Fire Control System, 8 × 5" (127mm)/38cal SP (4x2), 8 × 21"(533mm) T Tubes (2x4), 2 × Depth Charge stern racks; c1944: 1 × Mk37 Gun Fire Control System, 5 × 5"(127mm)/38cal DP (2x2,1x1), 1 × Mk51 Gun Director, 4 × Bofors 40mm AA (1x4), 8 × Oerlikon 20mm AA (8x1), 8 × 21"(533mm) T Tubes 2x4, 2 × Depth Charge stern racks

USS Phelps (DD-360) was a World War II-era Porter-class destroyer in the service of the United States Navy. She was named for Thomas Stowell Phelps, who was a Rear Admiral in the US Navy in 1884.

== Before World War II ==
Phelps was laid down 2 January 1934 by Bethlehem Shipbuilding Corporation's Fore River Shipyard, Quincy, Massachusetts; launched 18 July 1935; sponsored by Mrs. Richard A. Kearny; and commissioned 26 February 1936, Commander Albert H. Rooks in command. In November 1936 Phelps, along with the cruiser Chester, escorted the heavy cruiser Indianapolis carrying President Franklin D. Roosevelt to Buenos Aires, Argentina for the opening of the Inter-American Peace Conference of 1936. The cruise included good-will visits to Montevideo, Uruguay and Rio de Janeiro, Brazil.

== Entry in World War II ==
During the attack on Pearl Harbor on 7 December 1941, Phelps shot down one enemy plane. In February and March 1942, she served as part of the destroyer screen for Task Force 11, including the carrier USS Lexington, in an attack in the Huon Gulf off Lae and in an attack on Salamaua, New Guinea, over the Owen Stanley mountain range from the Gulf of Papua, 10 March 1942. During the Battle of the Coral Sea beginning on 8 May, when Lexington and USS Yorktown diverged to avoid enemy attacks, Phelps stayed with Yorktown. Phelps emerged from the battle with no casualties, but when the Lexington was seriously damaged, she helped to prevent enemy capture of the carrier by administering the coup de grâce and finished her off firing five torpedoes.

== Aleutians and Central Pacific action ==
In June 1942 she protected the American carriers that dealt a heavy blow to the Japanese Navy in the Battle of Midway. In August 1942 she guarded forces invading Guadalcanal. After a visit to the west coast in October, she participated in landings upon Attu, Alaska, in May 1943. After bombarding Kiska, Alaska, she provided gunfire support for landings at Makin Atoll in November 1943. In the Marshall Islands campaign in February 1944, she bombarded Kwajalein and Eniwetok. In March she guarded tankers during a strike on the Palau Islands. In June she bombarded Saipan to protect American forces that had landed there on the 15th.

== Atlantic duty ==
Following duty at Saipan, she steamed via the Panama Canal to Charleston, South Carolina, for armament alterations, arriving 2 August. Departing Norfolk, Virginia, in November, she escorted a convoy to Mers-el-Kebir, Algeria. After three more convoy escort voyages to the Mediterranean in 1945, she arrived at New York, New York 10 June.

== Decommissioning ==
The Phelps was decommissioned on 6 November 1945, and she was struck from the Naval Vessel Register 28 January 1947. She was scrapped shortly afterwards by Northern Metals Co. of Philadelphia, Pennsylvania.

== Battle honors ==
Phelps received twelve battle stars for World War II service.
