= Battle of Seattle (1856) =

1856 Battle of the Puget Sound War & Yakima War in Seattle, Washington

Coordinates: 47°36′N 122°19′W

- Part of the Puget Sound War, Yakima War
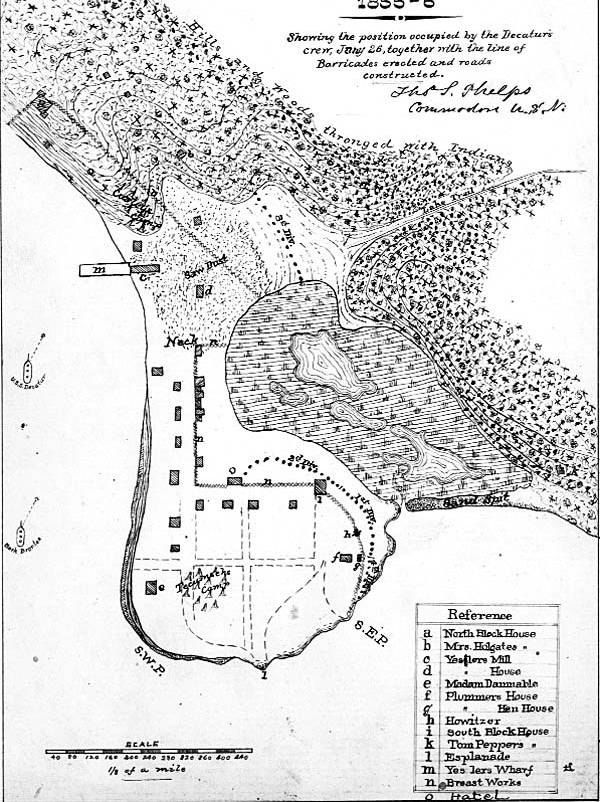
- Map of Seattle during the battle, drawn by Lieutenant Phelps of the USS Decatur
Date	January 26, 1856
Location	Seattle, Washington, United States
Result	United States victory

Belligerents
United States	Coalition of Indigenous tribes purportedly including: Nisqually; Klickitat; Spokane; Palus; Walla Walla; Yakama; Puyallup

Commanders and leaders
(United States) Guert Gansevoort	Chief Leschi (allegedly)

Casualties and losses
3 killed (includes Jack Drew, a deserter from the ship, killed by a settler)	Unknown, possibly 28 killed

The Battle of Seattle was a January 26, 1856 attack by a coalition of Native American tribes upon Seattle, Washington. At the time, Seattle was a small, four-year-old settlement in the then-Washington Territory. It had recently named itself after Chief Seattle (Sealth), a leader of the Suquamish and Duwamish peoples of central Puget Sound. The settlement was already made the seat of King County in 1852.

European-American settlers were backed by artillery fire and supported by Marines from the United States Navy sloop-of-war Decatur, anchored in Elliott Bay (Seattle's harbor, then called Duwam-sh Bay). They suffered two fatalities. It is not known if any of the Native American raiders died. The contemporary historian T. S. Phelps wrote that they later "would admit" to 28 dead and 80 wounded. The battle, part of the multi-year Puget Sound War or Yakima Wars (1855–1858), lasted a single day.

== Terrain ==
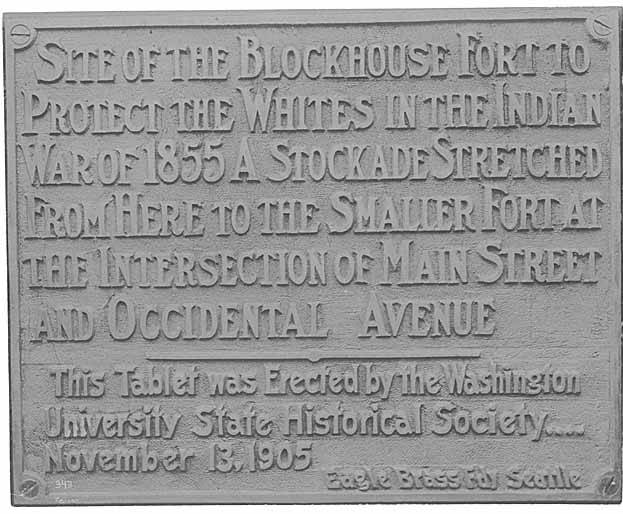
Memorial plaque for the blockhouse fort formerly located at Cherry Street

The Seattle settlement of the time was located roughly in the area of Seattle's Pioneer Square and its neighborhood. T. S. Phelps's memoir of the time described the settlement as:

…on a point, or rather a small peninsula, projecting from the eastern shore, and about two miles (3 km) from the mouth of Duwamish River, debouching at the head of the bay. The northern part of this peninsula is connected with the mainland by a low neck of marshy ground, and about one-sixteenth of a mile from its southeastern extremity a firm, hard sand-pit nearly joined it to the adjacent shore, severed only by a narrow channel through which the surplus waters of an inclosed swamp escaped into the bay. The south and west sides rose abruptly from the beach, forming an embankment from three to fifteen feet high; and proceeding thence northerly, the ground undulated for an eighth of a mile, when it gradually sloped towards the swamp and neck.

At the intersection of the latter with the main, and overlooking the water, rose a mound about thirty feet above the level of the bay; and to the eastward through a depression in the hills, and passing the head of the swamp, was a broad Indian trail leading to Lake Duwamish [now Lake Washington], distant two and a half miles.

Phelps remarks that the tailings from Henry Yesler's recently erected mill were steadily filling in the marshy land at the north of the head or peninsula where the settlement was located. He described the arrangement of the troops arrayed in defense on the nights before the battle:

The divisions… nightly occupied the shore, vigilantly guarding the people as they slept, and resting only when the morning light released them from the apprehended attack. … [They] were distributed along the line of defense in the following order: The fourth, under Lieutenant Dallas, commencing at Southeast Point, extended along the bay shore to the sand-bar, where, meeting with the right of the first division, Lieutenant Drake, the latter continued the line facing the swamp to a point half-way from the bar to a hotel situated midway between the bar and Yesler's place, and there joined the second, under Lieutenant Hughes, whose left, resting on the hotel (see Mother Damnable), completed an unbroken line between the latter and Southeast Point, while the howitzer's crew, Lieutenant Morris, was stationed near Plummer's house, to sweep the bar and to operate wherever circumstances demanded. The third division, Lieutenant Phelps, occupied that portion of the neck lying between the swamp and mound east of Yesler's place, to secure the approaches leading from the lake, and the marines, under Sergeant Carbine, garrisoned the block-house.

The divisions, thus stationed, left a gap between the second and third, which the width and impassable nature of the swamp at this place rendered unnecessary to close, thereby enabling a portion of the town to be encompassed which otherwise would have been exposed.

The distance between the block-house and Southeast Point, following the sinuosities of the bay and swamp shores, was three-quarters of a mile, to be defended by ninety-six men, eighteen marines, and five officers, leaving Gunner Stocking, Carpenter Miller, Clerks Francis and Ferguson, and fifteen men with Lieutenant Middleton, to guard the ship.

== Prelude ==
Washington Territory Governor Isaac Ingalls Stevens' ambitious treaty-making during 1854 and 1855 has been held to be the cause of the Puget Sound War. The battle was part of a Native American uprising in resistance to the pressure to cede land for reservations determined by territorial officials. There had been a series of skirmishes in the region over the previous several months, beginning October 28, 1855. There had been fighting between federal troops and natives in southern King, Thurston and Pierce counties. Five days before the attack on Seattle, Governor Stevens had declared a "war of extermination" upon the Indians.

The sloop Decatur had been called to Puget Sound both because of the trouble with local natives and to deter frequent raids by an alliance of the northern Haida from the Queen Charlotte Islands and the Tongass group of the Tlingit, from what was then Russian America. Captained by Isaac L. Sterret, the vessel struck an uncharted reef near Bainbridge Island on December 7, 1855, and was heavily damaged. (According to naval custom, the reef was named Decatur Reef.) They limped into Seattle for repairs, which lasted until January 19. Sterret was temporarily taken off active duty December 10, although later returned to active duty. However, on the day of the battle, Decatur was commanded by Guert Gansevoort.

Decatur lay at anchor in deep water, in a position from which it had total command of the settlement with 16 shipborne 32-pounder cannons firing fused shells. To the defense on land, the ship contributed two nine-pounder cannon and 18 stands of arms.

About this time, the raiders were attacking the White River settlers to the southeast. Survivors fled to Seattle. There they joined the fifty or so Seattle settlers. Assisted by marines from the Decatur, they had constructed a blockhouse from lumber originally intended for shipment to San Francisco.

Days before the battle (January 21), Territorial Governor Stevens arrived in Seattle aboard U.S.S. Active, and discounted rumors of war. Almost immediately upon his departure, reports from friendly natives warned that the governor had been completely mistaken and that an attack was imminent. These reports have been variously credited to Chief Seattle, his daughter Princess Angeline, or another chief, Sucquardle (known also as "Curley" or "Curly Jim").

David Swinson "Doc" Maynard, reputed to have had far more than the usual concern for the natives' rights and well-being, evacuated 434 friendly natives to the west side of Puget Sound (at his own expense and with the assistance of his wife).

To some extent, the settlers had organized for their defense as volunteers under a Captain Hewett. However, this company of volunteers had disbanded and re-formed several times over the months leading up to the battle. On the evening of January 22, with Decatur having taken a commanding position, the militia leaders declared that "they would not serve longer while there was a ship in port to protect them". Phelps writes that "a more reckless, undisciplined set of men has seldom been let loose to prey upon any community than these eighty embryo soldiers upon Seattle… after much rough argument about thirty of their number became partially convinced that their individual safety depended upon unity of action under a competent leader, and they finally consented to form a company, provided Mr. Peixotto would consent to serve as captain. That gentleman accepted the honor…"

Emily Denny mentions the company as being captained by Hewitt and including William Gilliam as 1st Lieutenant, D.T. Denny as Corporal, and Robert Olliver as Sergeant. Phelps names both Hewitt and Peixotto as captains.

Phelps lists the hostile natives as including the "Kliktat" (Klickitat and Spokane), "Palouse" (Palus), Walla-Walla, "Yakami" (Yakama), Kamialk, Nisqually, Puyallup, "Lake" (Duwamish-related, living near Lake Washington), "and other tribes, estimated at six thousand warriors, marshaled under the three generals-in-chief Coquilton, Owhi, and Lushi, assisted by many subordinate chiefs." They had failed to recruit warriors from any of the several tribes or nations from the Olympic Peninsula, nor did they succeed in winning the Snoqualmie over to their cause. Although the Snoqualmie chief Patkanim was strongly opposed to the European-American settlers, he allied with them in this war.

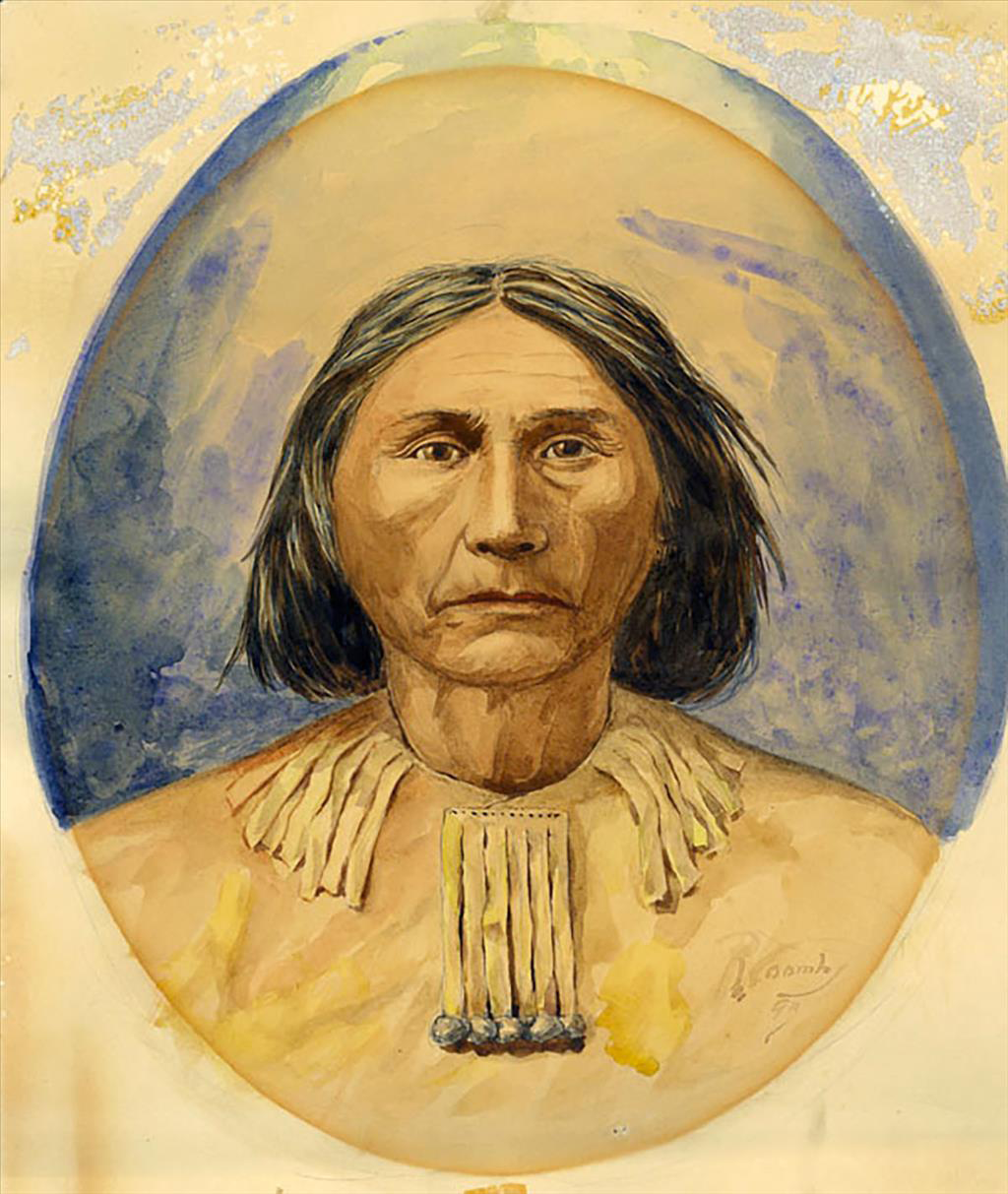
Portrait of Chief Leschi

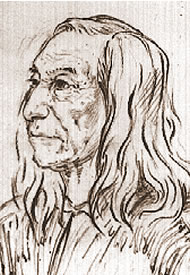
Portrait of Chief Owhi

Two hostile chiefs—Phelps says Owhi and Lushi (presumably, Leschi), other sources say Owhi and Coquilton—disguised themselves as friendly Indians and reconnoitered the situation the night before the battle. Phelps describes this in some detail: he was the sentry whom they tricked with a plausible story.

According to Phelps' account, at least two native chiefs were playing a double game. Curley Jim had been considered friendly enough by the settlers to be allowed to remain within their encampment; conversely, his nephew Yark-eke-e-man had been considered one of the hostile force. According to Phelps, the nephew intended to betray the native attack. Curley Jim left the settlement in the company of his visitors, and they parleyed around midnight at the lodge of a chief named Tecumseh; Yark-eke-e-man and several "chiefs of lesser note" were also present. They set out a plan to kill all of the settlers and U.S. military; Curley requested that his friend Henry Yesler be allowed to live, but accepted being overruled in the matter.

They resolved to attack in a few hours, around 2 a.m.; Phelps wrote that that plan would have succeeded, since no defender was planning for a pre-dawn assault. But Yark-eke-e-man convinced the raiders to try a mid-morning attack, using a small decoy force to draw the Decatur's men out of the well-defended areas to do battle on First Hill.

There are no reliable estimates of the size of the attacking force. Isaac Stevens (who was not present), wrote to Washington that settlers estimated that 200 to 500 Indians had taken the field against them. Phelps put the number of enemy at 2,000, but (write Crowley and Wilma) "frontier military officers often inflated the number of opposing forces to reinforce their accomplishments (or to minimize their failures)." Community college historian Murray Morgan writes that early "reports seem to have multiplied by ten the actual numbers. There could not have been more than one hundred and fifty."

Many settlers resided on scattered claims divided by thick forest, because to establish a land claim, settlers had to live on it. Some settlers doubted that the Indians would attack, and had to run for the blockhouse on the morning of the battle.

The first fatality of the engagement was Jack Drew, a deserter from Decatur killed in friendly fire. When he attempted to enter a cabin through a window, he was shot dead by fifteen-year-old Milton Holgate.

== Battle ==
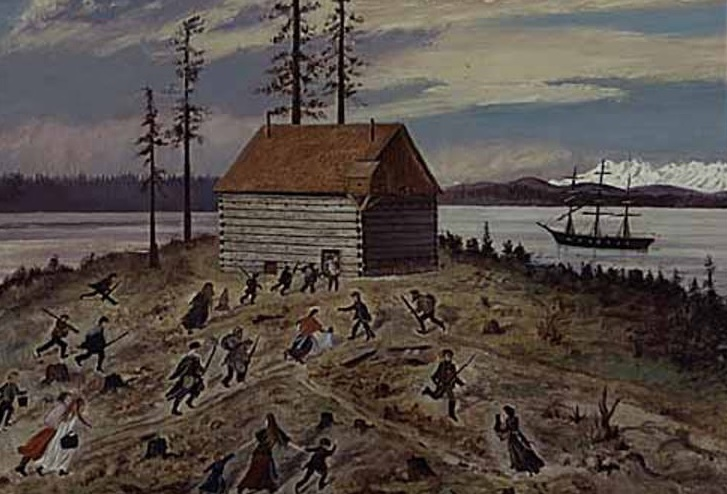
"Battle of Seattle", Emily Inez Denny

Because the natives' only common language was Chinook Jargon, a trade language that many of the white settlers also spoke, the settlers were able to hear and understand the attackers' shouted orders "and revealed many incidents of the battle they were anxious to conceal."

An Indian known as "Jim", a relative of Curley's who died a few months later in a hunting accident, evaded Curley's vigilance and warned Dr. Williamson of the impending attack. Williamson sent a messenger to Yesler, who informed Gansevoort, and Decatur's troops abandoned their breakfast and returned to the positions they had held by night. 52 women and children found refuge on board Decatur, and others on board the barque Brontes. The non-combatants of the friendly tribes took to their canoes to get out of the way.

Curley's sister (and Yark-eke-e-man's mother) Li-cu-mu-low ("Nancy"), whom Phelps describes as "short, stout, and incapable of running," warned as she headed for her canoe that the Kliktat were gathered around Tom Pepper's house, which was in the forest, near the crest of First Hill. Decatur fired off a howitzer shell in that direction, the first shot of the battle. Phelps and a few others had been trying unsuccessfully to rouse the volunteers from their torpor. At the sound of the howitzer shell, they rushed as one for the blockhouse. There "Sergeant Carbine several times charged them out of one door, to return as often by the other, till, wearying of the trouble, he left them to cower behind the wooden bulwarks, protected from the bullets of the foe."

The third division, contrary to orders, charged up the trail that led towards the lake. This charge met with success, as they pushed the attackers back without taking any casualties themselves. Klakum held a position behind a tree, and shot at Peixotto standing on the block-house steps, but missed and killed a boy, Milton G. Holgate, who was standing a few steps higher. It was the second death of a European American caused by another white.

On the south end, settlers on the peninsula faced off against natives on the mainland with a slough dividing them. Phelps describes "the incessant rattle of small-arms, and an uninterrupted whistling of bullets, mingled with the furious yells of the Indians," but there were few casualties. A settler was killed when he ducked from behind a stump to get some drinking water; Clarence Bagley, quoting William Bell two days after the event, says the casualty was Christian White; Phelps, writing 17 years later, says it was Robert Wilson.

Hans Carl, an invalided sailor on Decatur, died shortly thereafter, but for reasons unrelated to the battle.

== Aftermath ==
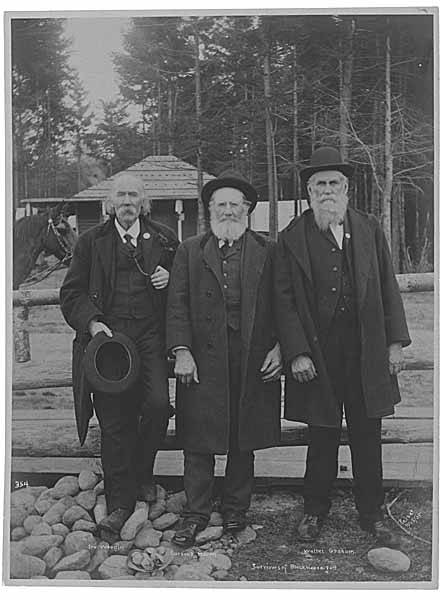
Blockhouse fort survivors Ira Woodin, Carson D. Boren, and Walter Graham (for whom the Graham Hill area is named) in a 1905 photograph by Theodore E. Peiser

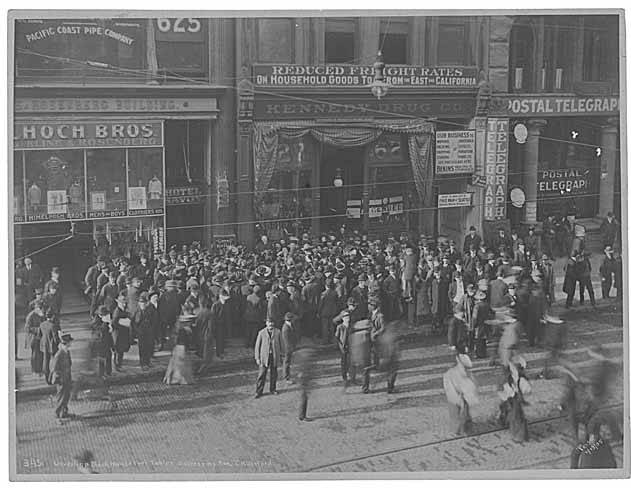
Unveiling on November 13, 1905 of a memorial tablet at the site of the former blockhouse fort on 1st Avenue and Cherry Street

Defeat in the Battle of Seattle had discouraged the natives, but the settlers remained apprehensive of another potential attack and wary for their own survival.

News of the attack spread rapidly. By 4 p.m. it was known in Bellingham. At noon the day after the battle, Active steamed into Elliott Bay, Governor Stevens aboard. Stevens was, in Phelps's words, "at last compelled to acknowledge the presence of hostile Indians in the Territory." Active headed south in the direction of Steilacoom, which seemed the most likely next target of an attack, dropping the governor at Olympia, the capital, on the way.

Yark-eke-e-man reported that the hostile chiefs were ill-provisioned. Confident of victory, they expected to provision themselves from the settlers' supplies. They spent the next several weeks scouring the land for food.

Two days after the battle, Coquilton threatened, through a messenger, that he would return within a month and mount a more destructive attack. The threat was taken seriously, and leaders decided to improve Seattle's defenses. Henry Yesler volunteered ship's cargo of house lumber, and on February 1 Decatur's divisions began a two-week project to erect a defensive palisade: two fences five feet high, placed eighteen inches apart, and filled in with well-tamped earth, 1,200 yards (1,100 m) long, and enclosing a large portion of the town. A second block-house was also erected, and an old ship's cannon, plus a 6-pounder field-piece borrowed from Active, were to serve as its artillery.

Trees and undergrowth were removed (variously attacked with levers, axes, and shovels, or burned in place) to provide an esplanade and enable Decatur's howitzer to sweep the shores. Much brush was also cleared from the town's inland edges, to reduce the cover for future attacks. On February 24, USS Massachusetts arrived and on March 28 USS John Hancock. Governor Stevens convinced Patkanim and his men to take on the role of bounty hunters, paying them handsomely for collecting the scalps of leaders of the hostile tribes.

The fortified town did not have to face a second battle. A court-martial convened in Seattle under Stevens' order on May 15 for the trial of Klakum and twenty other Indians. The military officers acquitted them, deeming their actions as having been legitimate warfare against recognized combatants, not criminal acts. They were released after a declaration of peace. It was certainly not the end of violence between settlers and natives in the region, but it was the end of outright war.

Nine days after the battle, Chief Leschi and Chief Kitsap, along with a group of 17 Indians, appeared at the home of John McLeod near the Nisqually River. McLeod was a former employee of the Hudson's Bay Company, had a Nisqually wife, and was trusted by the hostile Indians. Leschi said that neither he nor his band had taken part in the attack on Seattle, and he thought the attack had been foolish. Leschi asked for John Swan, another trusted white man, to visit Leschi's camp on the Green River for a peace conference. When Swan did visit Leschi's camp a few days later, he counted about 150 warriors, or men of fighting age. Nearly all were from west of the Cascades, with only 10–20 from the east.

== Casualties ==
Jack Drew, a deserter from the Decatur, was shot and killed by young Milton Holgate, a settler's son, when he tried to enter the latter's cabin. Holgate was killed by friendly fire, and another settler died in the battle: Christian White or Robert Wilson (see above). One sailor, Hans Carl, died later of causes unrelated to the battle. Phelps characterizes the low casualties as "incredible" and "miraculous", given that "one hundred and sixty men were for seven hours exposed to an almost uninterrupted storm of bullets".

The casualties on the native side are unknown. Phelps claimed personally to have seen ten men die from one shell. He said that the natives later admitted to 28 dead and 80 wounded, but said that the native women "secret[ed] the dead beyond all chance of discovery." No Indian bodies were found on the battlefield.

According to Seattle lore, decades after the battle, Seattle's future fire chief Gardner Kellogg was excavating his house and found a shell from Decatur that had buried itself without exploding. He stuck it under a stump that he was trying to burn out and went off to lunch. Dexter Horton stopped by to warm the seat of his pants at the fire, and as it exploded, nearly became the last casualty of the battle of Seattle.
