= White House Bridge =

Coordinates: 38.646209°N 78.535745°W

White House Bridge was located west of Luray, Virginia over the South Fork of the Shenandoah River. During the American Civil War, on 2 June 1862, Stonewall Jackson's cavalry chief Turner Ashby burned this bridge to slow down Federal pursuit of their forces. The battles of Cross Keys and Port Republic were fought a week later. Earlier that year, during April union cavalry had stopped Confederate forces from destroying the bridge.
