= James McAllister =

James or Jim McAllister or McAlister may refer to:

- James G. McAllister (1860–1933), American businessman and politician
- Jim McAllister (1944–2013), Northern Irish activist and politician
- James McAlister (1951–2018), American football player
- Jimmy McAlister (born 1957), American soccer player
- Jamie McAllister (born 1978), Scottish footballer
- James McAllister (boxer) (born 1963), Scottish boxer
- Jim McAlister (born 1985), Scottish footballer
- Jim McAllister, lead character in the 1999 American film Election
- Jim McAllister (Georgie & Mandy's First Marriage), fictional character in Young Sheldon and Georgie & Mandy's First Marriage
