= USS Decatur (1839) =

Gunboat of the United States Navy

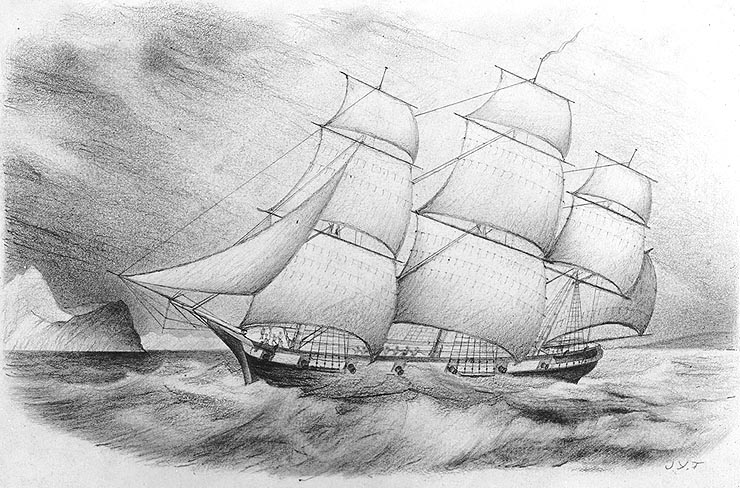
- USS Decatur

History

United States
- Laid down: date unknown
- Launched: 1838
- Acquired: 1839 at New York Navy Yard
- Commissioned: circa 16 March 1840
- Decommissioned: 20 June 1859
- In service: March 1863
- Out of service: 1865
- Stricken: 1865 (est.)
- Fate: Sold, 17 August 1865

General characteristics
- Displacement: 566 tons
- Length: 117 ft (36 m)
- Beam: 32 ft (9.8 m)
- Draft: depth of hold 15'; draft 15' 8"
- Propulsion: sail
- Speed: 10 knots
- Complement: 150 officers and men
- Armament: fourteen 32-pounder guns; two 12-pounder rifles

USS Decatur was a sloop-of-war in the United States Navy during the mid-19th century. She was commissioned to protect American interests in the South Atlantic Ocean, including the interception of ships involved in the African slave trade. Decatur served in both the Mexican–American War and the American Civil War.

The sloop-of-war was named in honor of Commodore Stephen Decatur (1779–1820), one of the United States Navy's greatest heroes and leaders of the first two decades of the 19th century.

== Launched in 1839 at the New York Navy Yard ==
Decatur, a large sloop of 566 tons, was built in 1838 and 1839 at New York Navy Yard. She was outfitted with heavy guns and manned by a crew of 150 officers and enlisted men.

== South Atlantic Ocean operations ==
Commanded by Commander H. W. Ogden, she sailed from New York 16 March 1840 for duty with the Brazil Squadron, returning to Norfolk, Virginia 28 February 1843. Her second cruise, from 5 August 1843 to 3 January 1845 was with the African Squadron for the suppression of the slave trade. She was placed in ordinary during 1845 and 1846.

== Mexican–American War operations ==
Decatur sailed from Hampton Roads, Virginia 1 March 1847, and after a brief stay at the Pensacola Navy Yard, arrived off Castle Juan de Uloa, Mexico, 14 April, for duty in the Mexican–American War.

Although she was too large to ascend the Tuxpan River, 14 of her officers and 118 men accompanied Commodore Matthew C. Perry's expedition to attack Tuxpan. She also furnished 8 officers and 104 men for the capture of Tabasco from 14 to 16 June. She continued to cruise in Mexican waters until 2 September when she sailed for Boston, Massachusetts, arriving 12 November.

== Atlantic Ocean operations ==
Rejoining the African Squadron, Decatur cruised on the northwest coast of Africa on the lookout for slave ships and protecting U.S. interests from 2 February 1848 to 15 November 1849. After a period in ordinary she sailed from Portsmouth, New Hampshire, for duty with the Home Squadron, cruising off the Atlantic Coast and in the Caribbean until arriving at Boston 21 August 1852 where she was decommissioned for repairs.

Recommissioned 12 July 1853 Decatur joined a Special Squadron to guard the fishing interests of American citizens in North Atlantic Ocean waters, returning to Boston in September to prepare for distant service. On 28 August 1853, she rescued the crew of the British ship Cleopatra, which had caught fire and capsized in the Gut of Canso. After searching for the missing merchant ship San Francisco in the Caribbean in January and February 1854, she sailed from Norfolk 16 June to join the Pacific Squadron.

== Pacific Ocean operations ==
After a stormy transit of the Straits of Magellan, she called at Valparaíso, Chile, arriving 15 January 1855, then visited Honolulu from 28 March to 23 June. Sailing on to Washington Territory, Decatur entered the Strait of Juan de Fuca 19 July.

On her way to Seattle, on 7 December 1855, Decatur ran aground on rocks at Restoration Point, Bainbridge Island, Washington Territory. Had she not righted herself with the incoming tide, the fate of Seattle might have turned out very differently. Decatur remained in the Pacific Northwest to deter Native American outbreaks, providing support to the settlers in the Battle of Seattle (26 January 1856). The city had been garrisoned with officers and crew of the Decatur while all hands returned to the ship. "the woman and children were sent on board, as citizens and marines were left in charge of the block house, as officers and crew returned to the ship". Involving about 900 people, the numbers were reported to Chief Seattle that "700 engaged the forces of the whites" while there were 110 officers and 70 citizens who partook in the battle. Despite rumours of 35 killed and 35 wounded on the side of the whites, only two casualties were reported, both civilians. Damage to the Decatur was repaired "all well on board" when the Decatur left Seattle.

Decatur Senior High School in Federal Way, Washington, was named after her to honor this defense. She cruised to San Francisco, California, between 2 August and 27 September 1855 for supplies.

On 13 June 1856, she arrived at Mare Island Navy Yard for repairs, and on 8 January 1857, sailed for Panama, touching at Central American ports for the protection of U.S. interests. She sailed 3 June to Nicaragua to evacuate U.S. citizens connected with the filibustering expedition of William Walker to Panama, where she arrived 5 August. She cruised off Panama, Peru, and Chile until 23 March 1859 when she was ordered to return to Mare Island.

== Civil War service ==
She was decommissioned at Mare Island 20 June 1859 and remained in ordinary until March 1863 when she was fitted as a defensive floating battery and stationed off San Francisco.

== Final decommissioning ==
She was sold at Mare Island on 17 August 1865.

== See also ==
- List of sloops of war of the United States Navy
- List of sailing frigates of the United States Navy
- Bibliography of early American naval history
