= Tillicum =

Tillicum or Tilikum is a word in Chinook Jargon that means people, family, tribe, and relatives, and may refer to:

== Places ==
- Tilikum Crossing, a bridge in Portland, Oregon
- Tillicum, Lakewood, a neighborhood in Lakewood, Washington
  - Tillicum station, a planned commuter rail station in Lakewood, Washington
- Tillicum Centre, a shopping centre in Victoria, British Columbia
- Tilikum Place, a plaza in Seattle, Washington
- Tillicum Village, a Seattle-area visitor attraction
- Tillicum Beach, a hamlet in Alberta near Camrose
- Tillicum Beach, a neighborhood on Camano Island, Washington, USA

== Boats and ships ==
- Tilikum (boat), a dug-out canoe used in Jack Voss and Norman Luxton's voyage around the world
- CFAV Tillicum (YTM 555), a harbour tug of the Canadian Armed Forces
- MV Tillikum an Evergreen State-class ferry of the Washington State Ferries system

== Other uses ==
- Tilikum (orca) (1981–2017), a bull orca, owned by SeaWorld Orlando, that had been involved in three human deaths
- Trillium ovatum var. Tillicum, a variant of T. ovatum, a small flowering plant native to the Pacific Northwest
- "Tillicum" (song), a song by Syrinx
- Tillicum Middle School, a middle school in the Bellevue School District in Bellevue, Washington

== See also ==
- Tillicum Elementary School (disambiguation)
