= Tillicum Village =

Visitor attraction in Washington (state), US

Coordinates: 47°32′30″N 122°28′57″W

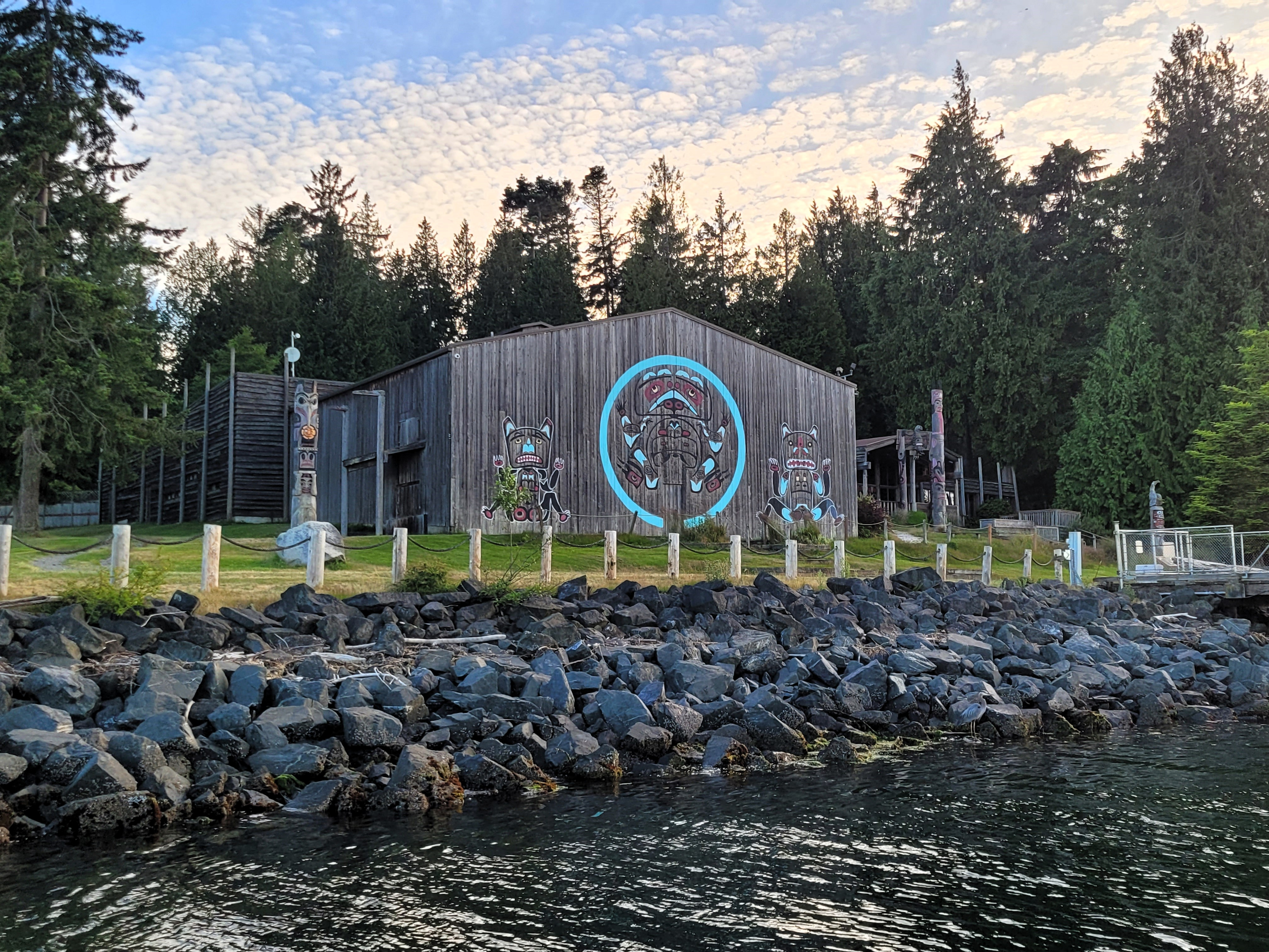
Tillicum Village in June 2023

Tillicum Village was a Puget Sound area visitor attraction located on Blake Island, a Washington State Park accessible only by boat, which is off the shore of Seattle, Washington, United States. Founded in 1962 by Bill Hewitt, control of Tillicum Village was sold to Argosy Cruises in 2009. Argosy Cruises operated the Tillicum Excursion, a four-hour cruise from Pier 55 in central Seattle to Tillicum Village and back, from 2009 to 2021.

== Facilities and tourism ==
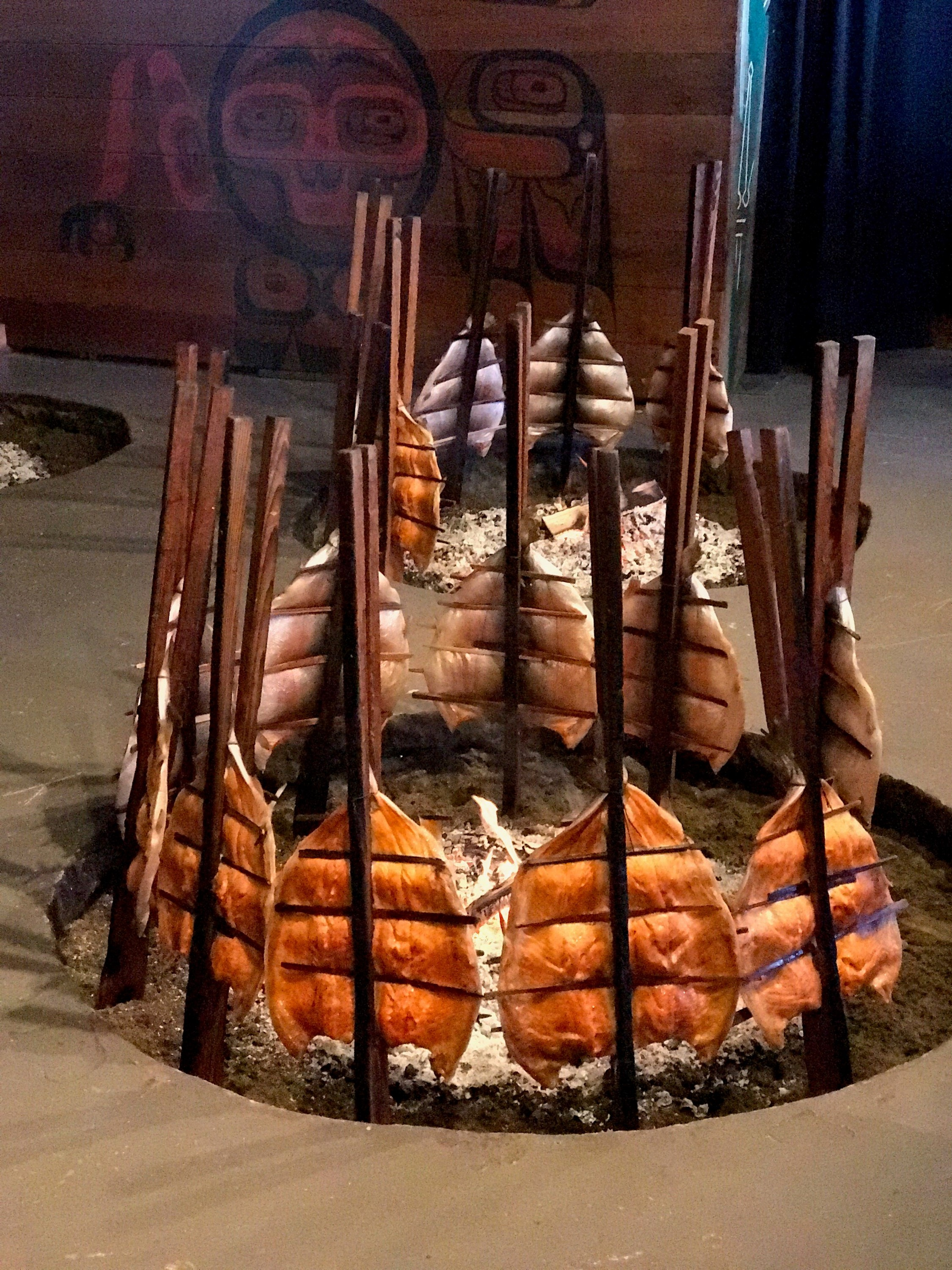
Salmon cook on stakes around fire pits in Tillicum Village. August 2017.

Tillicum Village occupies approximately 5 acres (2 ha) of leased land within Blake Island State Park. The Tillicum Excursion includes a greeting from Tillicum village employees costumed in Northwest Coastal Native tribal costume. Outside the longhouse, visitors are given a cup of clams and broth (clam nectar). Inside, the longhouse is decorated in art by members of Northwest Coastal Natives and a cooking display shows whole salmon being cooked on cedar stakes over an alder wood fire in a traditional style. Guests eat a buffet meal featuring the just-cooked salmon, after which a 25-minute performance is provided including filmed storytelling by Roger Fernandes of the Klallam tribe illustrated by the Tillicum Village dancers, who wear traditional masks. After the performance, visitors can interact with the performers and walk along the beaches and trails of the island.

Visitors can also camp on Blake Island and visit the Tillicum Village longhouse independently.

== History ==
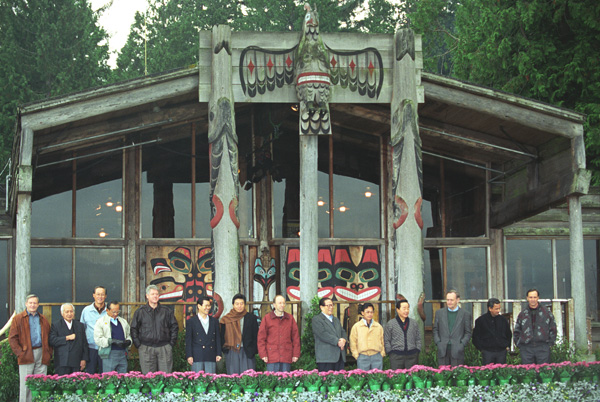
World leaders at Tillicum Village during the 1993 APEC summit.

Bill Hewitt, a local restaurant owner, founded Tillicum Village in 1962, the year of the Seattle World's Fair. The Hewitt family operated it until selling it to Argosy Cruises, the operator of the Tillicum Excursion, in 2009. For 18 years, the show was Dance on the Wind, focusing on dances of British Columbia tribes and provided by Thompson's, a locally based theatrical production company. There were 100,000 visitors in 1978. The facilities and show were updated in 2011.

In 1993, President Clinton hosted the first Asia-Pacific Economic Cooperation forum in the Tillicum Village longhouse.

In 2021, Argosy Cruises ended its Tillicum Excursion due to revenue losses attributed to the COVID-19 pandemic.

== See also ==
- Tilikum (disambiguation)
- Tilikum Place
