= Statue of Chief Seattle =

Statue in Seattle, Washington, U.S.

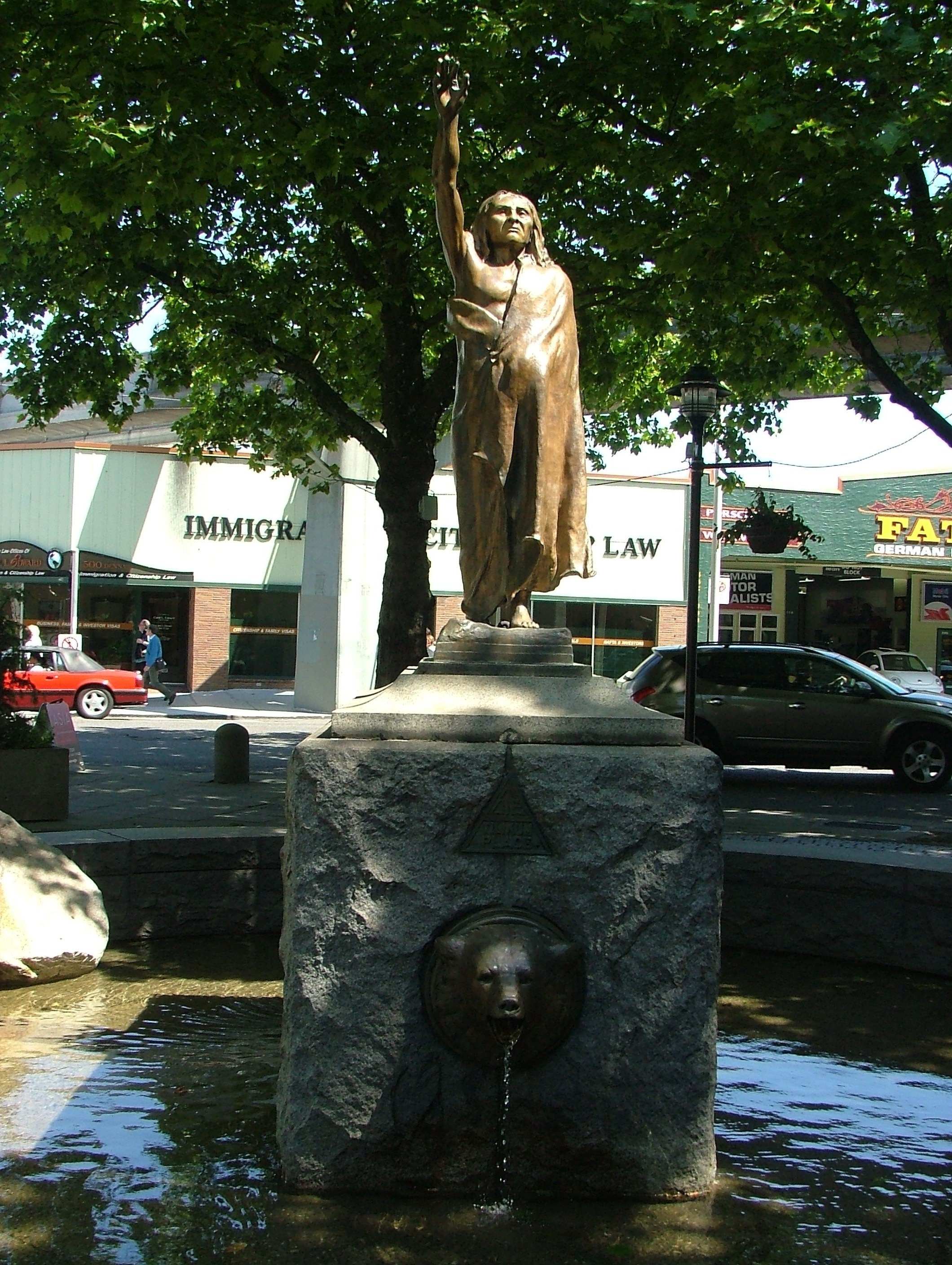
- The statue in 2006
- Artist: James Wehn
- Year: 1912
- Type: Sculpture
- Medium: Copper
- Subject: Chief Seattle
- Location: Seattle, Washington, U.S.
- Seattle, Chief of the Suquamish, Statue
- U.S. National Register of Historic Places
- Seattle Landmark
- Coordinates: 47°37′06″N 122°20′51″W
- Built: 1912
- NRHP reference No.: 84003502

Significant dates
- Added to NRHP: April 19, 1984
- Designated SEATL: May 6, 1985

An outdoor life-size sculpture of Chief Seattle by local artist James Wehn is installed in Tilikum Place in Seattle, Washington, in the United States.

== Description ==
The copper statue, which weighs between 300 and 400 lbs. (136–181 kg), shows Seattle with his right hand extended as if in greeting. The statue stands atop a stone base that was designed to serve as a fountain, although the fountain has been turned off and on over the years.

== History ==
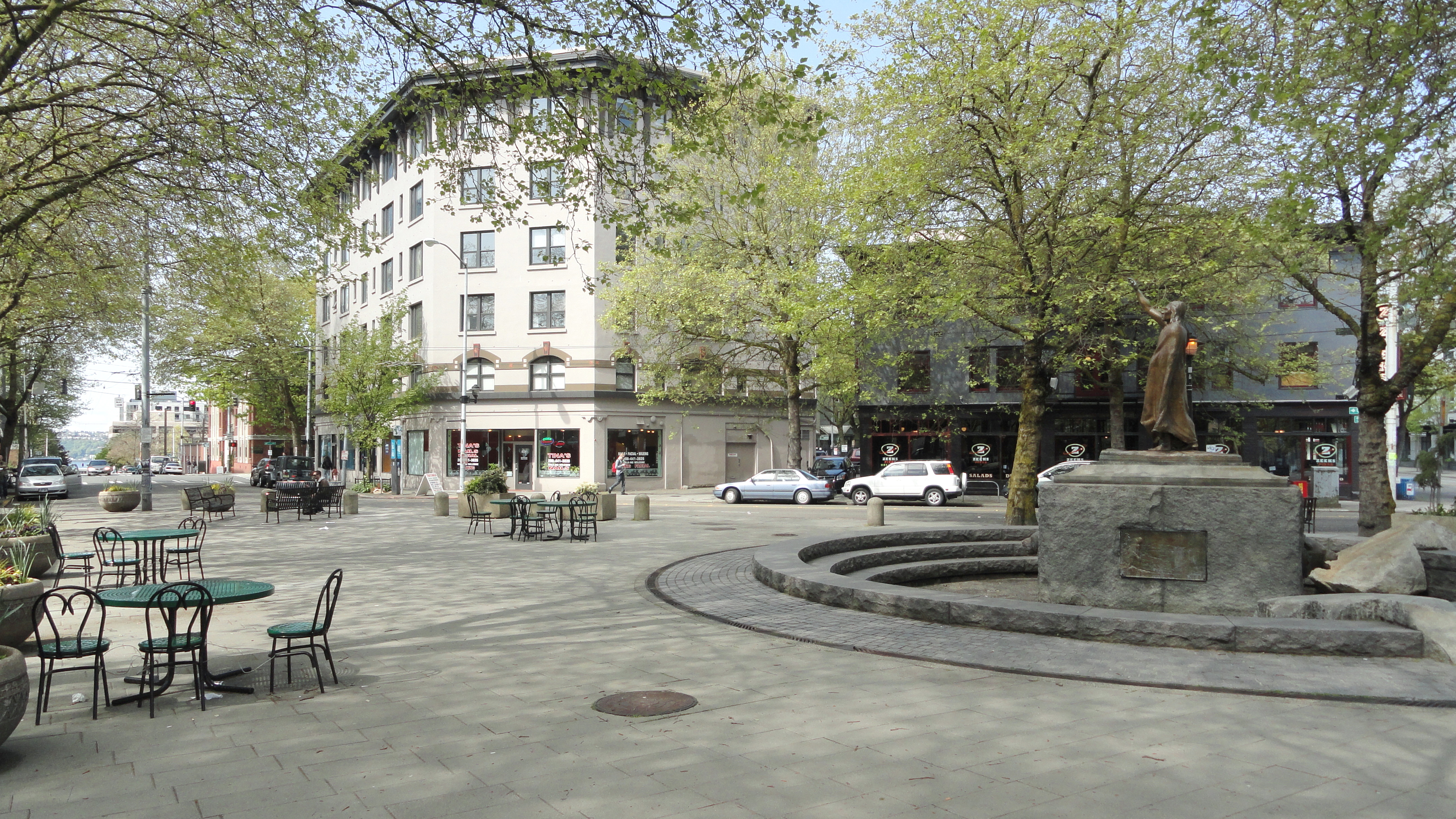
The statue overlooking Tilikum Place in 2012

Commissioned in 1907, Wehn's design suffered from multiple poor castings and was finally sent to New York for casting. The statue was formally unveiled in Tilikum Place by Myrtle Loughery, a great-great-granddaughter of Chief Seattle, on November 13, 1912. The statue was the first commissioned in Seattle and only the city's second piece of public art in all.

After unsuccessful proposals to move the statue to locations such as Duwamish Head, Denny Park, and Pioneer Square, the statue was removed for cleaning in anticipation of the Century 21 Exposition of 1962. Wehn objected to a proposal to turn the statue around so it would face the then-new Seattle Center Monorail. After its cleaning, the statue was returned to its original location and orientation, facing Elliott Bay.

The statue was rededicated on December 8, 1975. By 1980, the statue had turned green. A local taxi driver attempted to clean it himself, scratching it and exposing its original bronze color. A subsequent restoration revealed that the statue originally had been gilded (covered in gold leaf). It was added to the National Register of Historic Places on April 19, 1984, and named a city landmark on May 6, 1985.

== See also ==
- 1912 in art
- National Register of Historic Places listings in Seattle
- Native Americans in popular culture
