= Chief Seattle's speech =

1854 speech, weakly attributed decades later

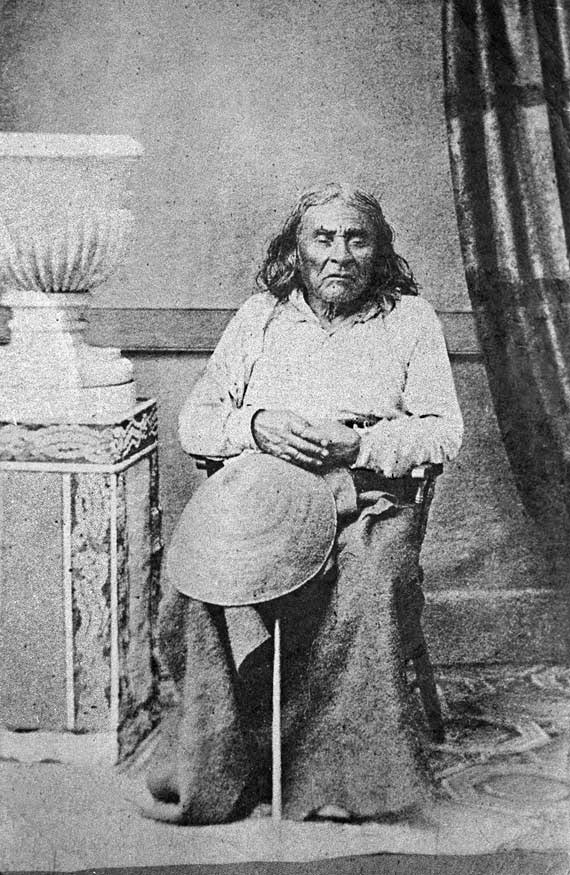
The only known photograph of Chief Seattle, taken in 1864

Chief Seattle's speech is one that Chief Seattle probably gave in 1855 to an audience including the first Governor of Washington Territory, the militaristic Isaac Stevens. Though the speech itself is lost to history, many putative versions exist, none of which are particularly reliable.

The evolution of historic records of the speech, from a flowery Victorian paean to peace and territorial integrity, into a much briefer environmentalist credo, has been chronicled by several historians. The first attempt to reconstruct this history was a 1985 essay in the U.S. National Archives' Prologue magazine. A more scholarly essay by a German anthropologist followed in 1987. In 1989, a radio documentary by Daniel and Patricia Miller resulted in the uncovering of no fewer than 86 versions of Chief Seattle's speech. This then prompted a new discussion, first in the Seattle Weekly and then in Newsweek. The historian Albert Furtwangler then undertook to analyze the evolution of Chief Seattle's speech in a full-length book, Answering Chief Seattle (1997). More recently, Eli Gifford has written another full-length book, The Many Speeches of Chief Seattle (2015), which assembles further elements of the story, gives accurate transcriptions of 11 versions of the speech, and explores possible motivations for manipulating the words in each case.

== The oldest version: 1887 ==
The oldest extant record of this document is a transcript published in the Seattle Sunday Star in 1887, in a column by Henry A. Smith, a poet, doctor, and early white settler of the Seattle area. Smith provides a transcript of a speech made by Chief Seattle 30 years earlier, which Smith had attended and taken notes from. The occasion of the speech was a visit by the newly appointed Governor, Isaac Stevens. The governor's visit to a council of local tribal chiefs that year is corroborated by the historical record. Chief Seattle was the most influential chief in the area, so it is likely he would have been in attendance.

However the date, the location, and the actual words of Chief Seattle's speech are disputed. For instance, Smith's article in the Seattle Sunday Star claims that the purpose of Governor Stevens's meeting was to discuss the surrender or sale of the Indians' land to white settlers — but there is no record to support that this was the purpose of Stevens's visit; in fact, the purpose of the visit seems to have been to investigate lands already considered to belong to the United States. Moreover, contemporary witnesses do not place Smith at the 1854 meeting. There is a written record of a later meeting between Governor Stevens and Chief Seattle, taken by government interpreters at the Point Elliott Treaty signing on January 22, 1855. But the proceedings of this meeting bear no resemblance to the reminiscence that Smith recorded in 1887.

According to Smith's recollection, Doc Maynard introduced Governor Stevens, who then briefly explained his mission, which was already well understood by all present. Chief Seattle then rose to speak. He rested his hand upon the head of the much smaller Stevens, and declaimed with great dignity for an extended period. Smith then presents a detailed translation of the speech. However, recent scholarship questions the authenticity of Smith's version of the speech. Chief Seattle most probably spoke in the Lushootseed language, and someone then translated his words into Chinook Jargon, a limited trading language, that a third person then translated into English. But Smith's English version is in a flowery Victorian prose, and Smith noted that he had recorded "but a fragment of his [Seattle's] speech". Moreover, Smith's version of the speech does not square with the recollections of other witnesses (Smith himself may not have been present as a witness.) As a result of such discrepancies, staff of the National Archives in Washington, DC, concluded that the speech is most likely fiction.

However, a spokesperson for the Suquamish Nation has said that according to their traditions, Smith consulted the tribal elders numerous times before publishing his transcript of the speech in 1887. The elders apparently saw the notes Smith took while listening to the speech. The elders' approval of Smith's transcript, if real, would give that version the status of an authentic version. Smith's notes are not known to survive; they may have been lost when Smith's office burned in the Great Seattle Fire.

Smith waited thirty years to publish his transcript of the speech, and it is commonly believed that Smith did so for political reasons. Newly-arrived immigrants were starting to threaten the status of the white settlers who had dominated local politics. There was a bitterly contested election, with one newspaper claiming these new immigrants wanted "the overthrow of our institutions, ... rob you ... of home, of country and of religion." Some claim that Smith used the speech to talk about the demise of the original pioneers that were denounced as "obstacles in the way of progress," and as "old mossbacks".

== Later versions ==
The first few subsequent versions can be briefly enumerated: in 1891, Frederick James Grant's History of Seattle, Washington reprinted Smith's version. In 1929, Clarence B. Bagley's History of King County, Washington reprinted Grant's version with some additions. In 1931, Roberta Frye Watt reprinted Bagley's version in her memoir, Four Wagons West. That same year, John M. Rich used the Bagley text in a popular pamphlet, Chief Seattle's Unanswered Challenge.

In the late 1960s, a new era dawned in the fame of the speech and in its further modification. This began with a series of articles by William Arrowsmith, a professor at the University of Texas, which revived interest in Seattle's speech. Arrowsmith had come across the speech in a collection of essays by the President of Washington State University. At the end of one of the essays, there were some quotes from Smith's version of Chief Seattle's speech. Arrowsmith said it read like prose from the Greek poet Pindar. With interest aroused, he found the original source. After reading it, he decided to try improving Smith's version of the speech, by removing Victorian influences. Arrowsmith attempted to get a sense of how Chief Seattle might have spoken, and to establish some "likely perimeters of the language."

But the massive fame of Chief Seattle's speech is probably due to a poster printed in 1972, which shows a picture of Chief Seattle overlaid with words from his "letter" to "the president in Washington". The words are in fact taken from Arrowsmith's version of the speech, but with further modifications such as the image of shooting buffalo from trains, and the line "The earth does not belong to man; man belongs to the earth."

The poster was made to promote a movie called Home, an environmentalist movie produced for the Southern Baptist Radio and Television Commission. The movie's producer wanted to show a distinguished American Indian chief delivering a statement of concern for the environment, so the script writer, Ted Perry, wove together environmentalist rhetoric with pieces of Chief Seattle's speech in the Arrowsmith version. But Perry was not credited with this because, according to Perry, the producer thought the movie would seem more authentic if the text was attributed directly to Chief Seattle himself and not to a screenwriter.

Perry himself explained what happened:

I first heard a version of the text read by William Arrowsmith at the first Environmental Day celebration in 1970. I was there and heard him. He was a close friend. Arrowsmith's version hinted at how difficult it was for Seattle to understand the white man's attitude toward land, water, air, and animals. For the soundtrack for a documentary I had already proposed about the environment, I decided to write a new version, elaborating on and heightening what was hinted at in Arrowsmith's text ... While it would be easy to hide behind the producer's decision, without my permission, to delete my "Written by" credit when the film was finished and aired on television, the real problem is that I should not have used the name of an actual human being, Chief Seattle. That I could put words into the mouth of someone I did not know, particularly a Native American, is pure hubris if not racist. While there has been some progress in our knowledge of Native Americans, we really know very little. What we think we know is mediated by films, chance encounters, words, images and other stereotypes. They serve our worldview but they are not true.

It turns out that the producer, John Stevens, had added a lot of elements to make the speech compatible with Baptist theology, including the words "I am a savage and do not understand." Stevens said:

I edited the speech to fit our needs [Baptists] more closely. There was no apple pie and motherhood and so I added the references to God and I am a savage to make the Radio and Television Commission happy ... I had edited scripts that did not have the Baptists' line dozens of times. This needed to be done so they could justify spending thousands of dollars on a film ... I eventually quit my job as a producer because I got tired of shoehorning those interests into scripts.

The version of Chief Seattle's speech edited by Stevens was then made into a poster and 18,000 copies were sent out as a promotion for the movie. The movie itself sank without a trace, but this newest and most fictional version of Chief Seattle's speech became the most widely known, as it became disseminated within the environmentalist movement of the 1970s — now in the form of a "letter to the President" (see below).

In 1993 Nancy Zussy, a librarian at Washington State University, analyzed the versions of Chief Seattle's speech (or "letter") which were then in circulation. She identified four major textual variants, which she ascribed to four authors as follows:

- "Version 1", the Smith version
- "Version 2", the Arrowsmith version
- "Version 3", the Perry/Stevens version
- "Version 4", a shortened version of the Perry/Stevens version – no known author

== The "letter" ==
A similar controversy surrounds a purported 1855 letter from Seattle to President Franklin Pierce, which has never been located and, based on internal evidence, is described by historian Jerry L. Clark as "an unhistorical artifact of someone's fertile literary imagination". It seems that the "letter" surfaced within environmentalist literature in the 1970s, as a slightly altered form of the Perry/Stevens version. The first environmental version was published in the November 11, 1972 issue of Environmental Action magazine. By this time it was no longer billed as a speech, but as a letter from Chief Seattle to President Pierce. The editor of Environmental Action had picked it up from Dale Jones, who was the Northwest Representative of the group Friends of the Earth. Jones himself has since said that he "first saw the letter in September 1972 in a now out of business Native American tabloid newspaper." Here all leads end, but it is safe to assume the original source was the movie poster.

There is no record of a letter from Chief Seattle in either the private papers of President Pierce in the New Hampshire Historical Society, or in the Presidential Papers of Pierce in the Library of Congress.

The staff at the National Archives has been unable to locate any such letter among the records of the Bureau of Indian Affairs in the National Archives and "concluded that the letter ... is probably spurious."

It would be quite improbable if not impossible for a letter from the Chief of an Indian tribe to the President of the United States not to have been recorded in at least one of the governmental offices through which it passed. For the letter to have made it to the desk of the President it would have passed through at least six departments: the local Indian agent, Colonel Simmons; to the superintendent of Indian Affairs, Gov. Stevens; to the Commissioner of Indian Affairs; to the office of the Secretary of the Interior and finally to the President's desk—quite a paper trail for the letter to have left not a trace. It can be concluded that no letter was written by or for Seattle and sent to President Pierce or to any other President. (Seattle was illiterate and moreover did not speak English, so he obviously could not write English.)
