= Princess Angeline =

Native American basket weaver (c.1820–1896)

Kikisoblu
- Kikisoblu (also known as Princess Angeline) in an 1896 photogravure by Edward Sheriff Curtis
- Born: c. 1820; Rainier Beach, Seattle
- Died: May 31, 1896; Seattle, Washington, U.S.
- Resting place: Lake View Cemetery, Seattle, Washington, U.S.
- Known for: Being the daughter of Chief Seattle, Basketweaving
- Parent: Chief Seattle

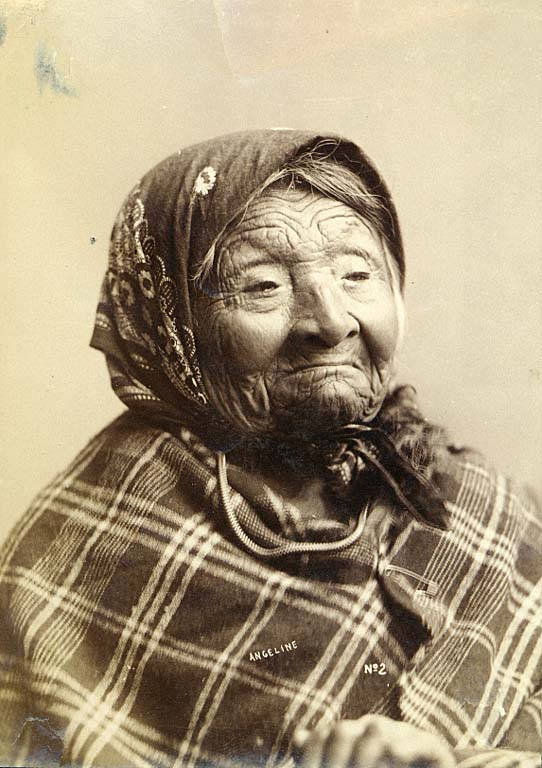
Kikisoblu c. 1893 by Frank La Roche

Princess Angeline (c. 1820 – May 31, 1896), also known in Lushootseed as Kikisoblu, Kick-is-om-lo, or Wewick, was the eldest daughter of Chief Seattle.

== Biography ==
She was born around 1820 to Chief Seattle in what is now Rainier Beach in Seattle, Washington. She was named Angeline by Catherine Broshears Maynard, the second wife of Doc Maynard. In 1856, during the Puget Sound War, she is said to have conveyed a warning from her father to the citizens of Seattle regarding an imminent attack by a large native coalition force. Thanks to this warning, the settlers and neutral native tribespeople were able to protect themselves during the resulting Battle of Seattle.

The 1855 Treaty of Point Elliott required that all Duwamish Indians leave their land for reservations, but Kikisoblu remained in Seattle in a waterfront cabin on Western Avenue between Pike and Pine Streets, near what is now Pike Place Market. She did laundry and sold handwoven baskets. Like her father, Kikisoblu became a Christian and remained a Roman Catholic until her death on May 31, 1896.

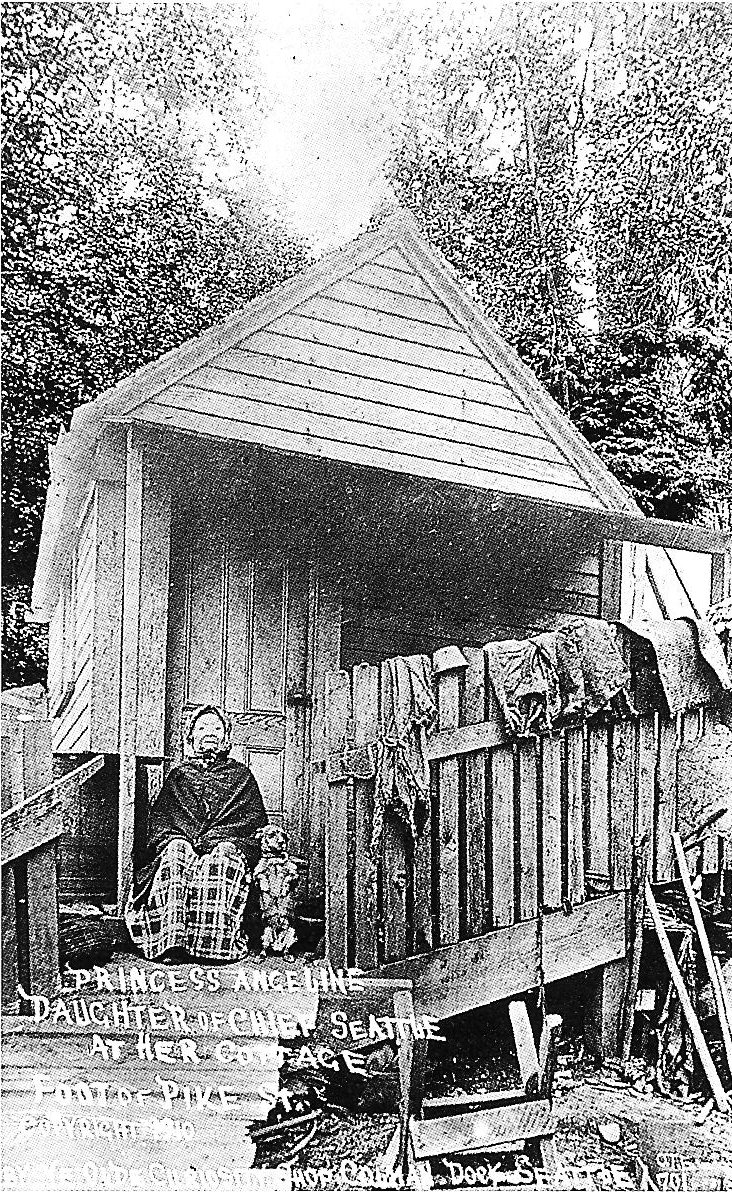
Postcard of Kikisoblu and her home near the foot of Pike Street, Seattle, Washington

She was buried (in a canoe-shaped coffin) in Lake View Cemetery on Capitol Hill, next to Henry Yesler. Years later, Seattle schoolchildren raised money for a headstone.

The Chronicle of Holy Names Academy reported:

May 29, 1896. With the death of Angeline Seattle died the last of the direct descendants of the great Chief Seattle for whom this city was named. Angeline—Princess Angeline—as she was generally called, was famous all over the world… Angeline was a familiar figure of the streets, bent and wrinkled, a red handkerchief over her head, a shawl about her, walking slowly and painfully with the aid of a cane; it was no infrequent sight to see this poor old Indian woman seated on the sidewalk devoutly reciting her beads. The kindness and generosity of Seattle's people toward the daughter of the chief… was shown in her funeral obsequies which took place from the Church of Our Lady of Good Help. The church was magnificently decorated; on the somber draped catafalque in a casket in the form of a canoe rested all that was mortal of Princess Angeline.

== Legacy ==
S. Angeline Street on Seattle's Beacon Hill and in Columbia City and Seward Park was named after Princess Angeline. Also Angeline and S. Angeline in her Tribal home land of Suquamish (Kitsap County). She also appears in the Cherie Priest novel Boneshaker.

In photos, Kikisoblu most often appears wearing a red bandana, shawl, and many layers of clothing. She was photographed by people such as F. Jay Haynes, Edwin J. Bailey, Frank La Roche, Edward S. Curtis, and others.

In Seattle, the YWCA has a Belltown shelter named Angeline's Day Center for Women for her. It provides support for homeless women and transitional housing guidance.

Due to the close relationship between Seattle's indigenous population and the region's orca population, one of the Southern resident orcas, J17, was nicknamed Princess Angeline after Kikisoblu. J17's fourth calf, J53 Kiki, was also named after Kikisoblu.
