= Boneshaker (novel) =

2009 novel by Cherie Priest

- Author: Cherie Priest
- Language: English
- Series: The clockwork century
- Genre: Science fiction, alternate history
- Publisher: Tor Books
- Publication date: 2009
- Publication place: United States
- Media type: Print (Hardcover & Paperback)
- Pages: 416
- Awards: Locus Award for Best Science Fiction Novel (2010)
- ISBN: 0765318415
- Followed by: Clementine

Boneshaker is a science fiction novel by American writer Cherie Priest, combining the steampunk genre with zombies in an alternate history version of Seattle, Washington. It was nominated for the 2009 Nebula Award for Best Novel and the 2010 Hugo Award for Best Novel. It won the 2010 Locus Award for Best Science Fiction Novel.

== Plot ==
Early in the American Civil War, rumors of gold in the Klondike have brought would-be prospectors to North America's Pacific Northwest. Anxious Russian investors commission American inventor Leviticus Blue to create a machine which can mine through the ice of Russian-owned Alaska. Blue's "Incredible Bone-Shaking Drill Engine" (or "Boneshaker" for short, named after boneshaker bicycles of the era), instead destroys several blocks of downtown Seattle and releases a subterranean vein of "blight gas" that kills anyone who breathes it and turns some of the corpses into rotters (non-supernatural zombies). A wall is erected to contain the gas within the affected part of the city. Leviticus Blue is nowhere to be found.

Sixteen years later, Leviticus's wife and son, Briar and Zeke (Ezekiel) Wilkes, live in the impoverished outskirts of the former metropolis. Life is difficult, but Briar manages to support herself and Zeke by working a physically demanding blue collar job cleaning water. One day, Zeke enters the toxic city in search of evidence proving his father is innocent of the intentional destruction. Briar intends on following, but the drainage hole collapses in an earthquake. She then hitches a ride over the wall by a captain of an airship, the unnaturally tall Captain Cly. Meanwhile, Zeke meets Rudy, a man who claims to be a highly decorated lieutenant. Rudy tells Zeke that he can lead him to his parents' former house. The pair of them encounter a Native American woman named Princess Angeline who lightly wounds Rudy, but they manage to elude her.

Briar is attacked by rotters, which causes her to flee to the roof of a building, where she is rescued by Jeremiah Swakhammer and his Doozy Dazer. He takes her to a bar named in honor of her deceased father to meet people including the barkeeper, Lucy O'Gunning. Rotters attack the bar, forcing the occupants to retreat. It is later revealed that a man named Minnericht caused the rotter attack. Lucy takes Briar to see Minnericht, believed by some to be Leviticus Blue. Briar, however, doubts this. Unbeknownst to her, Minnericht has taken Zeke hostage. A battle breaks out between Minnericht's men and Swakhammer, Lucy, and the Indian princess. This battle attracts the rotters, complicating Briar's efforts to reunite with her son and exit the dangerous area of Seattle.

Swakhammer is found unconscious and in critical condition by Briar. She tries to make Minnericht help him, leading to a heated argument in which Briar renounces that he is Leviticus, and mocks him. Unbeknownst to Minnericht, the Indian Princess is behind him, and while Briar distracts him she comes, slits his throat, and kills him in revenge for her daughter Sarah's suicide, which he drove her to (Minnericht was Sarah's husband, making him Angeline's son-in-law).

Everyone reunites and escapes to the surface. Eventually Briar leads Zeke to her and Leviticus' old home and tells Zeke that she killed Leviticus Blue years ago, as he tried to escape Seattle with his Boneshaker. Briar shows her son Blue's mummified body, still inside Boneshaker. Zeke claims he doesn't hold any grudge against his mother for killing her husband, and they embrace, before leaving to loot what is left of the former Blue residence.

== Characters ==
- Briar Wilkes Blue is one of the two main protagonists of the novel, alongside her son Ezekiel. She is 35 years old and lives with her son in the Outskirts. She is the widow of Leviticus Blue, the creator of the titular Boneshaker, and lives with the bad reputation of what his work has done to Seattle. Because of this and because her husband married her for youth and beauty rather than true love, Briar refers to herself and is mainly referred to by her maiden name, Wilkes. Her late father Maynard is viewed as a folk hero in Seattle and by young people in the Outskirts, but Briar has very mixed feelings about her father. Briar is sharp, resourceful, stubborn (especially when she's set her mind on something), and is unafraid to speak her mind. Her main goal for returning to the city is to find and retrieve her son, who is convinced of his father's innocence. Briar reveals at the end of the novel she murdered her husband to keep him from escaping Seattle in the Boneshaker. Her son holds no grudge against her for this and they embrace.
- Ezekiel Wilkes usually referred to as Zeke, is one of the two main protagonists of the novel alongside his mother Briar. He is 15 years old and lives with his mother in the Outskirts. The only son of Briar and Leviticus Blue, Zeke hates the way his mother is treated to due his late father's reputation. He believes that his father did not intentionally cause the Blight gas explosion, and goes into Seattle to prove it. Zeke is resourceful and stubborn (similar to his mother), but is naive at times. He, like many of the young people in the Outskirts and in Seattle, views his grandfather Maynard as a hero (to his mother's chagrin). At the end of the novel, he learns his mother killed his father to prevent him from leaving Seattle in the Boneshaker, but he is not angry with her for this and they embrace.
- Leviticus Blue (referred to by Briar as Levi) is the creator of Dr. Blue's Incredible Bone-Shaking Drill Engine, or the titular Boneshaker, which caused the blight gas explosion. He is the deceased husband of Briar and deceased father of Ezekiel. Blue won a contest and the funds to create a machine that would harvest gold from deep within the Klondike region, and thus created the Boneshaker for the task. On a test run, the machine destroyed much of Seattle, killed thousands of people and released blight gas into the air. Blue claimed it was an accident, and his son attempts to prove his father is innocent. However, at the end of the novel, it is revealed that Blue kept maps of Seattle's banks from the underground, with Briar discovering bags of money from the banks in his laboratory. He was killed by Briar after he attempted to flee Seattle in the Boneshaker after its destruction, and his corpse was left inside the machine to be discovered by his widow and son.
- Maynard Wilkes is the father of Briar, grandfather of Ezekiel and the father-in-law of Leviticus. He greatly disapproved of Briar's marriage to Leviticus as he was double her age, and Briar cut herself off from him for it. He was in jail at the time of the blight explosion, and was chiefly responsible for saving and freeing the prisoners. He died from this rescue and was buried in backyard of his former house. For this rescue, he viewed as a hero by Seattle and by the young people of the Outskirts, and his identity earns Briar and Zeke protection in Seattle.
- Princess Angeline, often referred to as the princess, is a Native American princess living in Seattle. She is a rough, tough, blunt and no-nonsense woman who is helpful (in her own way) and protective of those around her. People appear to be afraid of her as well. She fiercely hates Dr. Minnericht and wants to kill him, succeeding in doing so with Briar's help. It is revealed after she does this that Minnericht was married to her daughter Sarah, and his murder was in revenge for him driving Sarah to suicide.
- Jeremiah Swakhammer is the first person whom Briar meets in Seattle, Swakhammer is chiefly identified by his massive physique, distinctive voice, custom body armor, and signature weapon his Doozy Dazer (affectionately nicknamed 'the Daisy'). He is kind-hearted and protective, and is one of the best fighters in the novel, if not the best. Near the end of the novel, Swakhammer is fatally shot by Minnericht after taking up arms against him, and his survival is unknown.
- Lucy O'Gunning is the owner of an underground bar called Maynard's (named for Briar's father) in Seattle. She is recognized for her single mechanical arm which is mounted with a removable crossbow and by her sweet, motherly demeanor. She is fond and protective of her bar patrons, and is especially fond of Briar, whom she refers to with terms of endearment. Before the blight explosion, she owned a bar with her husband Charlie. Her husband turned and she lost her arm after he bit her, and lost the other arm in a furnace explosion. Her mechanical arm was made by Minnericht and is upkept by him (despite the fact he attached it without her consent). She is very afraid of Minnericht, but help leads the revolution against him near the end of the novel.
- Dr. Minnericht is Seattle's "law and order" after the blight gas explosion. He is a highly controlling man, having a large number of people under his employment and making the residents of Seattle indebted to him. Whenever the residents displease him, he sets rotters upon them. He never removes his mask, and underneath his mask his face is heavily scarred with burns. He is believed by the residents to be Dr. Leviticus Blue, and even by Ezekiel (whom he takes hostage), but Briar firmly believes he is lying. Near the end of the novel, after taking Briar and Zeke hostage, the residents of Seattle stage an uprising against him. He shoots Jeremiah Swakhammer fatally but is killed by Princess Angeline with the help of Briar. After his death, it is revealed that his name is actually Joe Foster and he was the husband of Princess Angeline's daughter Sarah. He drove his wife to suicide and stole Leviticus' inventions in order to pass himself off as the long-dead scientist.
- Captain Cly is the captain of the Naamah Darling with his crew, Rodimer and Fang. He takes Briar into Seattle to find Zeke. He and his brother were responsible for bringing the deceased Maynard home after he freed them from the jail, and feels he owes Briar a debt for this. He takes Briar and Zeke out of the city, and as payment, is invited to loot the Blue house, an offer he accepts.
- Croggon Hainey, usually referred to as simply Crog, is the captain of the Free Crow. He is the one who guides Briar to Cly to take her into Seattle. He is a courteous soul and loves his ship. He encounters Zeke after attacking Captain Brink's ship and attempts to rescue him. He is last seen aboard the Naamah Darling after it is revealed Captain Brink stole the Free Crow from him (which ironically, Crog stoleinitially) and being invited to loot the Blue house, which he accepts.
- Rudy, full name Alistair Mayhem Osterude, is the first person Zeke meets when he arrives in Seattle. He is a gruff alcoholic who claims to be a highly decorated lieutenant and wields a gun disguised as a cane. He and Zeke are separated after a rotter attack, and he is revealed to be a deserter by Princess Angeline. He is bitten by rotters and left to turn by Zeke and Angeline.

== Authorial intent ==
Boneshaker is the first novel in Priest's "Clockwork Century" setting. She has affirmed that with Boneshaker she sought to create a literary magnum opus for the steampunk movement, stating "Steampunk, I think, has been hunting for that for a while."

== Adaptations ==
Boneshaker was adapted for GraphicAudio by Doug Krentzlin. Directed by and starring Colleen Delany, it was released on 1 May 2014 (ISBN 978-1-62851-058-4).

Hammer Film Productions, along with Cross Creek Pictures and Exclusive Media Group, optioned the film rights and John Hilary Shepherd is writing the screenplay.

== Reception ==
Mary Ann Quinn in the Seattle Times wrote:

Priest, 34, is a well-spoken Capitol Hill resident whose idea of fun is a stroll in Seattle's Lakeview Cemetery, gathering 19th-century names for her characters. She has spent time and thought constructing the internal logic of the steampunk world of "Boneshaker." ...I think I was born 30 years too soon for steampunk, but I get it. Machinery you can understand. Cool Victorian threads. And villains cloaked in steam, lots of steam.

David Barnett in The Independent wrote:

Given the current craze for the shambling undead, Boneshaker could easily have become just another zombie thriller. But while the "rotters", as they are known in Seattle, are an ever-present threat, they're never in danger of intruding into the superb world-building and characterisation. Which means that the thrilling Boneshaker will survive the ebb and flow of fashions and subgenres within the broad church of science fiction.

Elaine Gallagher of Fiddlehead in Interzone wrote:

The Clockwork Century stories are notable for their strong female characters...Priest's language on the other hand feels completely right for the American Civil War setting and I found "Fiddlehead" and the other Clockwork Century stories to be completely immersive.
