= Chief of the Suquamish – Chief Seattle =

Sculpture in Seattle, Washington, U.S.

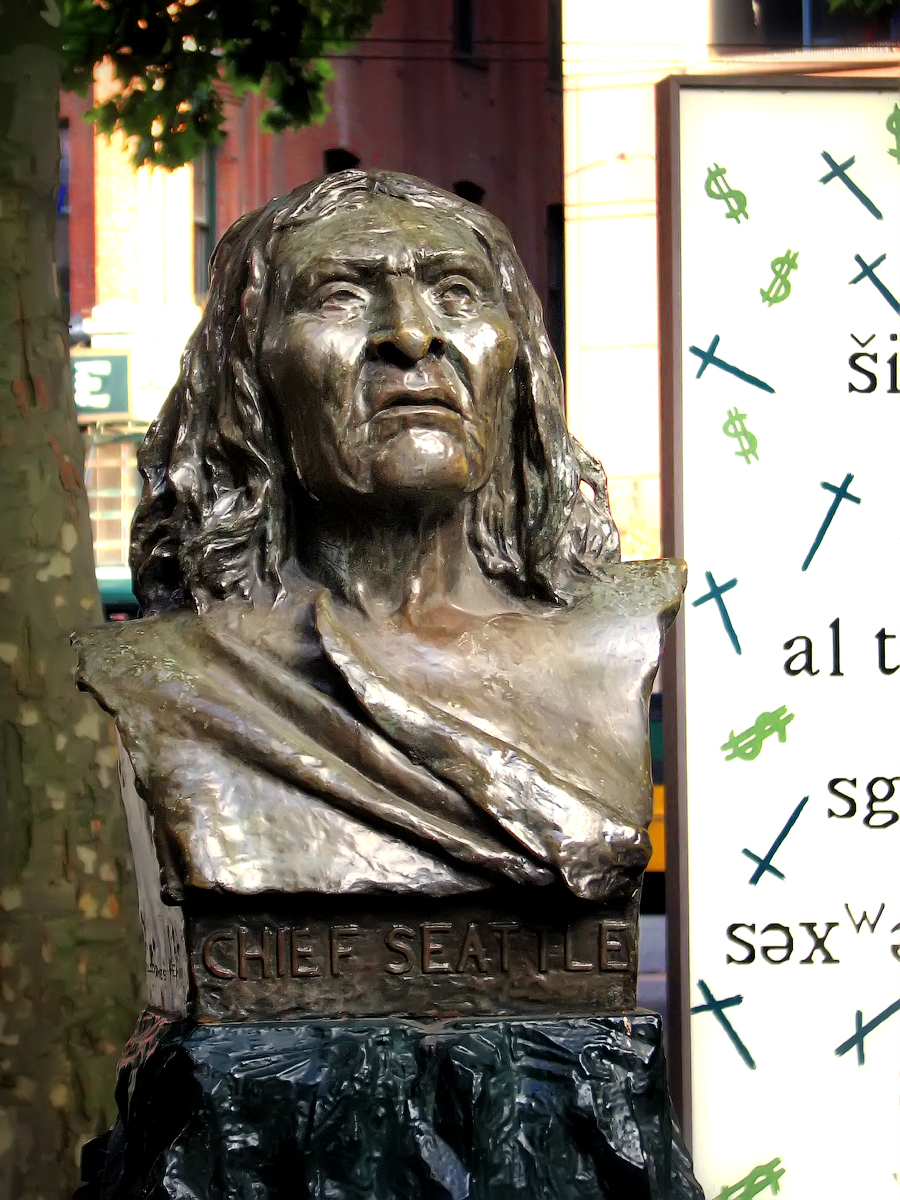
- The bust installed at Pioneer Square in 2008
- Artist: James A. Wehn
- Type: Sculpture
- Medium: Bronze
- Subject: Chief Seattle
- Location: Seattle, Washington, United States; 47°36′07.2″N 122°20′01.4″W

Chief of the Suquamish – Chief Seattle, also known as Bust of Chief Seattle and Chief Seattle Fountain, is a bust depicting Chief Seattle by artist James A. Wehn. It was commissioned by the Seattle Park Board to accommodate the Alaska-Yukon-Pacific Exposition, and initially sat on a fountain for men, dogs and horses.

== Versions ==
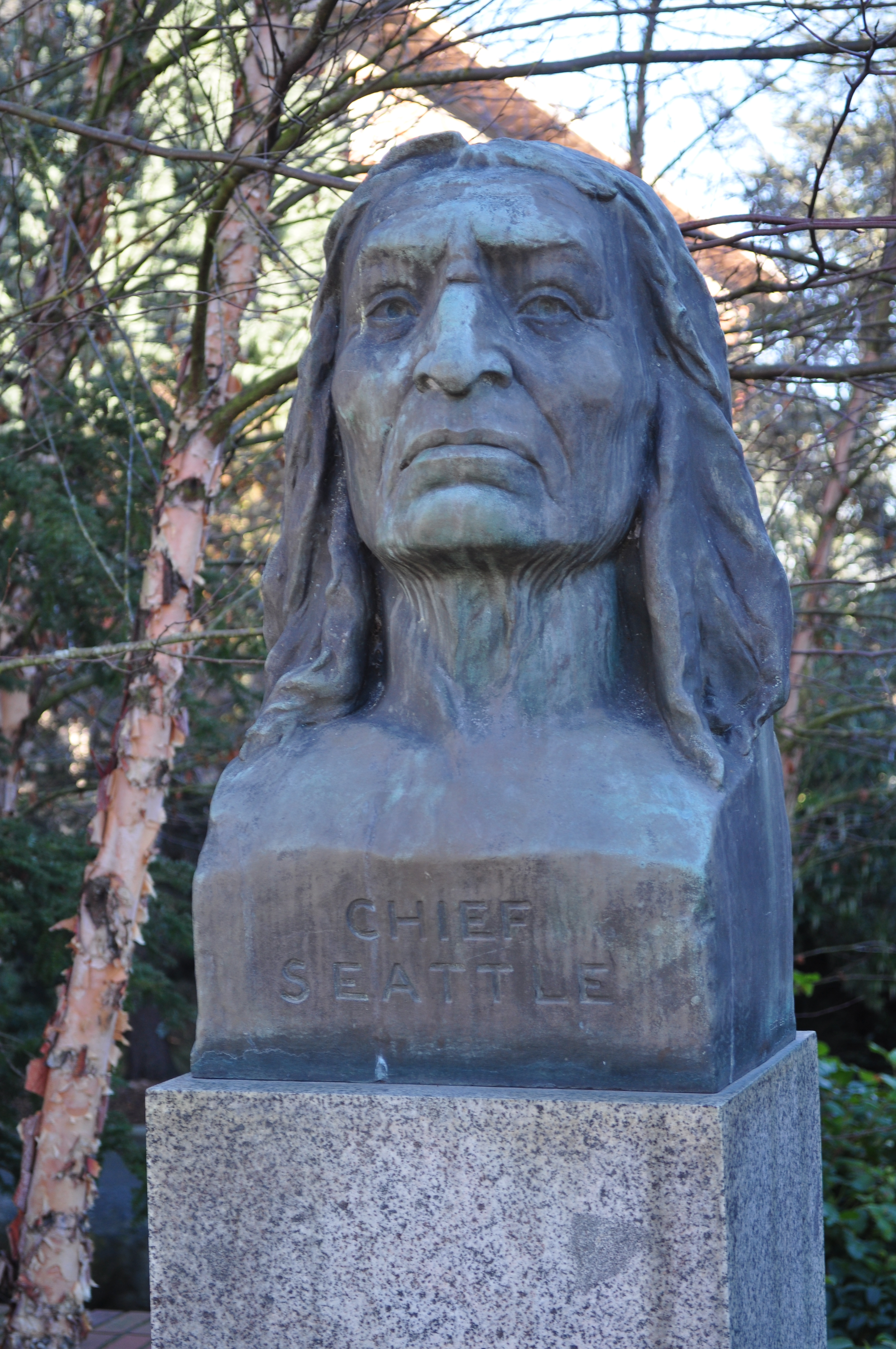
The bust installed at Seattle University

The bronze installed at the intersection of First Avenue and Yesler Way in Pioneer Square, Seattle, was created in 1909. It was surveyed and deemed "treatment needed" by the Smithsonian Institution's "Save Outdoor Sculpture!" program in March 1994.

Another version of the bust is installed at Seattle University.

== See also ==
- 1909 in art
- Native Americans in popular culture
