= Chief Seattle =

Suquamish and Duwamish chief (c. 1780–1866)

Si'ahl
- siʔaɬ
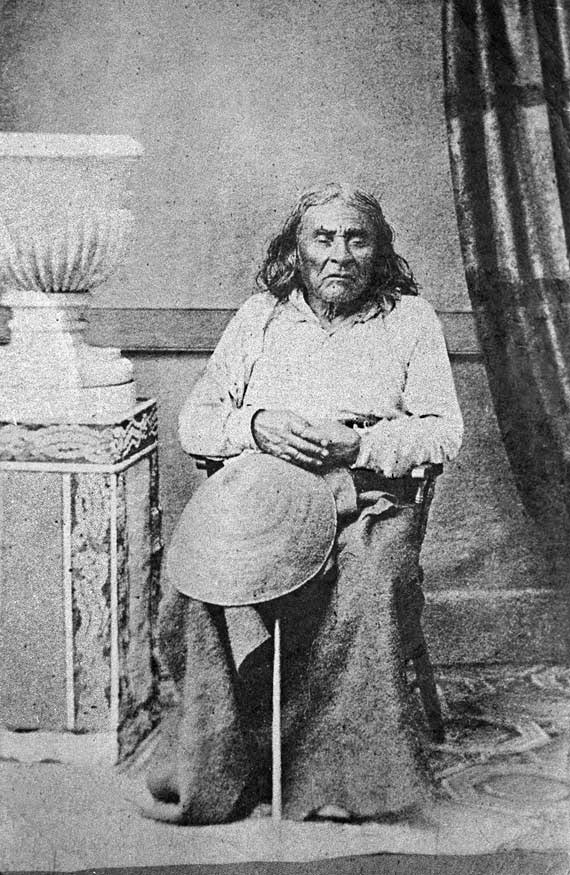
- Si'ahl, circa 1864

Leader of the Suquamish and Duwamish
- In office c. 1840–1866

Personal details
- Born: c. 1780 Puget Sound region, present-day Washington, U.S.
- Died: June 7, 1866 Port Madison Indian Reservation, Washington, U.S.
- Resting place: Suquamish, Washington, U.S.
- Spouses: Ladaila; Olahl
- Children: 7, including Kikisoblu (Princess Angeline)
- Parents: Sholeetsa (mother); Shweabe (father)
- Known for: Namesake of Seattle, Washington; Chief Seattle's speech
- Mother tongue: Lushootseed
- Nickname: Noah (baptismal name)

Seattle (c. 1780 – June 7, 1866; Lushootseed: siʔaɬ, IPA: [ˈsiʔaːɬ]; usually styled as Chief Seattle) was a leader of the Duwamish and Suquamish peoples. A leading figure among his people, he pursued a path of accommodation to white settlers, forming a personal relationship with Doc Maynard. The city of Seattle, in the U.S. state of Washington, was named after him. A widely publicized speech arguing in favor of ecological responsibility and respect for Native Americans' land rights has been attributed to him.

== Name ==
The name Seattle is an anglicization of his name in his native Lushootseed language, siʔaɬ. According to Upper Skagit elder Vi Hilbert, his name was traditionally pronounced siʔaƛ̕. After his baptism in 1852, he gained the baptismal name of Noah Seattle.

In English, his name is often also spelled Si'ahl, Sealth, Seathl or See-ahth as an attempt to be more accurate to the Lushootseed pronunciation. There is no "th" sound in the Lushootseed language.

== Life ==
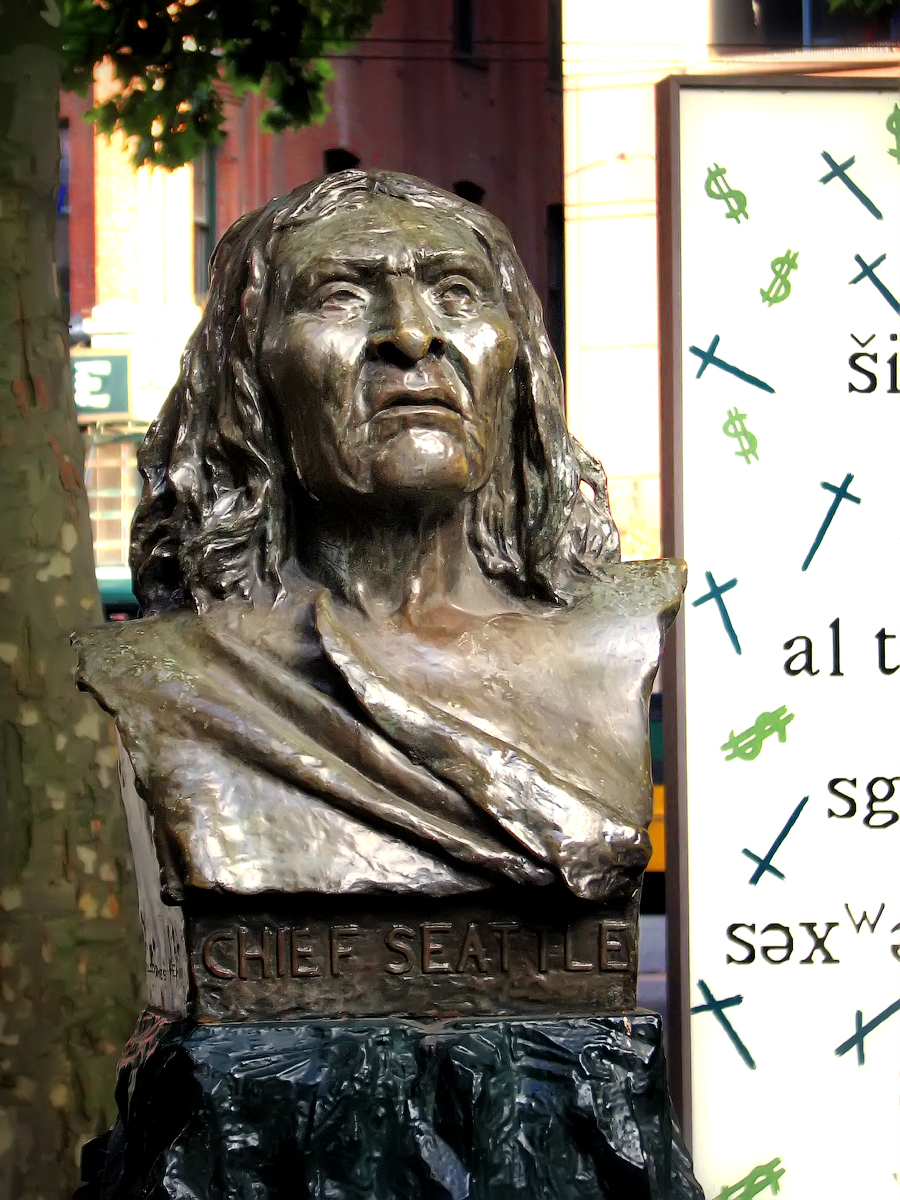
Chief Seattle's bust in the city of Seattle

=== Youth ===
Seattle was born around 1780 to Schweabe, a Suquamish leader from dxʷsəq̓ʷəb, the main Suquamish village on Agate Pass, and Sholeetsa (Note: also spelled Sholitza) a Duwamish woman. By some accounts, his mother was born into slavery, while in others, she was a high-born noblewoman. His exact birthplace is also disputed. According to some historians, as well as the tradition of the Suquamish Tribe, Seattle was born on Blake Island (Lushootseed: tatču), and his mother was from the village of stəq on the White River. (Note: Now the Green River) Seattle himself said he was born on Blake Island. According to the Duwamish Tribe, Seattle was born at his mother's village on the Black River, near what is now the city of Kent, Washington. According to one of his contemporaries, an American settler named Emily Inez Denny, he was born at the Old Man House at dxʷsəq̓ʷəb.

Seattle grew up speaking both the Duwamish and Suquamish dialects of Southern Lushootseed. Seattle's Suquamish family was a powerful one, and they dominated parts of Kitsap Peninsula, Vashon Island, Bainbridge Island, and Blake Island. Because power and authority in Coast Salish culture are traditionally not guaranteed through descent, Seattle had to prove his worth to his Coast Salishan society.

In 1792, when Seattle was around six years old, he met HMS Discovery and HMS Chatham under the command of George Vancouver, who had anchored off Restoration Point on Bainbridge Island. Seattle and his family, who were occupying nearby Blake Island gathering food, were visited by a party from the Vancouver expedition. Seattle's father, Schweabe, and uncle, Kitsap, may have been the two "chiefs" that Vancouver invited onto his ship. Over several days, Vancouver and the Suquamish (who were soon joined by their Duwamish neighbors) interacted extensively, trading goods and observing each other. Seattle often talked about this experience later in his life. Seattle would also later visit Fort Nisqually to trade with the Hudson's Bay Company. It is likely that these events taking place in his formative years encouraged his fascination with Europeans and their culture.

At some time during his youth, Seattle participated in a traditional coming-of-age ceremony called a vision quest (Lushootseed: ʔalacut). His nobility was affirmed by the reception of a powerful spirit power, the thunderbird. In the traditional religion of the peoples of southern Puget Sound, having a strong spirit power is a symbol of strength, purity, and prestige.

Seattle married into Duwamish families from t̕uʔəlalʔtxʷ, a significant village at the mouth of the Duwamish River. He had two wives and seven children, the most famous being Kikisoblu, also known as Princess Angeline. Kikisoblu was his first child and was born to his first wife, Ladalia, who died after her daughter's birth. Historical sources differ on the distribution of his other children between his two wives.

=== A feared Suquamish warrior ===
As Seattle aged, he earned a reputation as a leader and a strong warrior. In his early 20s, Seattle participated in a coalition war against the Cowichan peoples of Vancouver Island led by his uncle Kitsap. Around 1810, Seattle led an ambush against a group of raiders in five canoes coming down the Green River. Seattle's raiding party killed or enslaved the occupants of three canoes and sent the remaining two canoes back as a warning. Seattle also led a raid against the S'Klallam people on the Olympic Peninsula and may have also led further raids against the Snoqualmie people as well. Coast Salish peoples historically practiced slavery, and, like many of his contemporaries, Seattle enslaved people whom he had captured during his raids, further increasing his prestige.

By 1833, he had become known to the staff of Fort Nisqually as Le Gros, 'the big guy'. He was seen as an intelligent and formidable leader, owing to his strong voice and towering physique, standing nearly six feet (1.8 m) tall. Francis Herron, the Chief Trader at the fort, considered him important and dangerous and requested him to sign a treaty forswearing murder. In 1837, however, Seattle murdered a Skykomish shaman. The new Chief Trader, William Kittson, hoped that the Suquamish would kill him; however, they continued to value him as a leader.

In 1841, Seattle led a raid on the village of ʔilalqʷuʔ, located near modern-day Auburn at the former confluence of the Green and White rivers. The raid was in retaliation for a murder committed by someone from the village, and it crippled the village. Later, in 1847, he was part of the leadership of the Suquamish war against the Chemakum, who were decimated and effectively wiped out following the war. However, one of his sons was killed in battle with the Chemakum, leading Seattle to seek baptism into the Catholic Church around 1848. Seattle was probably baptized by the Missionary Oblates of Mary Immaculate in Olympia, where he chose the baptismal name of Noah after the prophet of the same name.

=== Friendship with American settlers ===
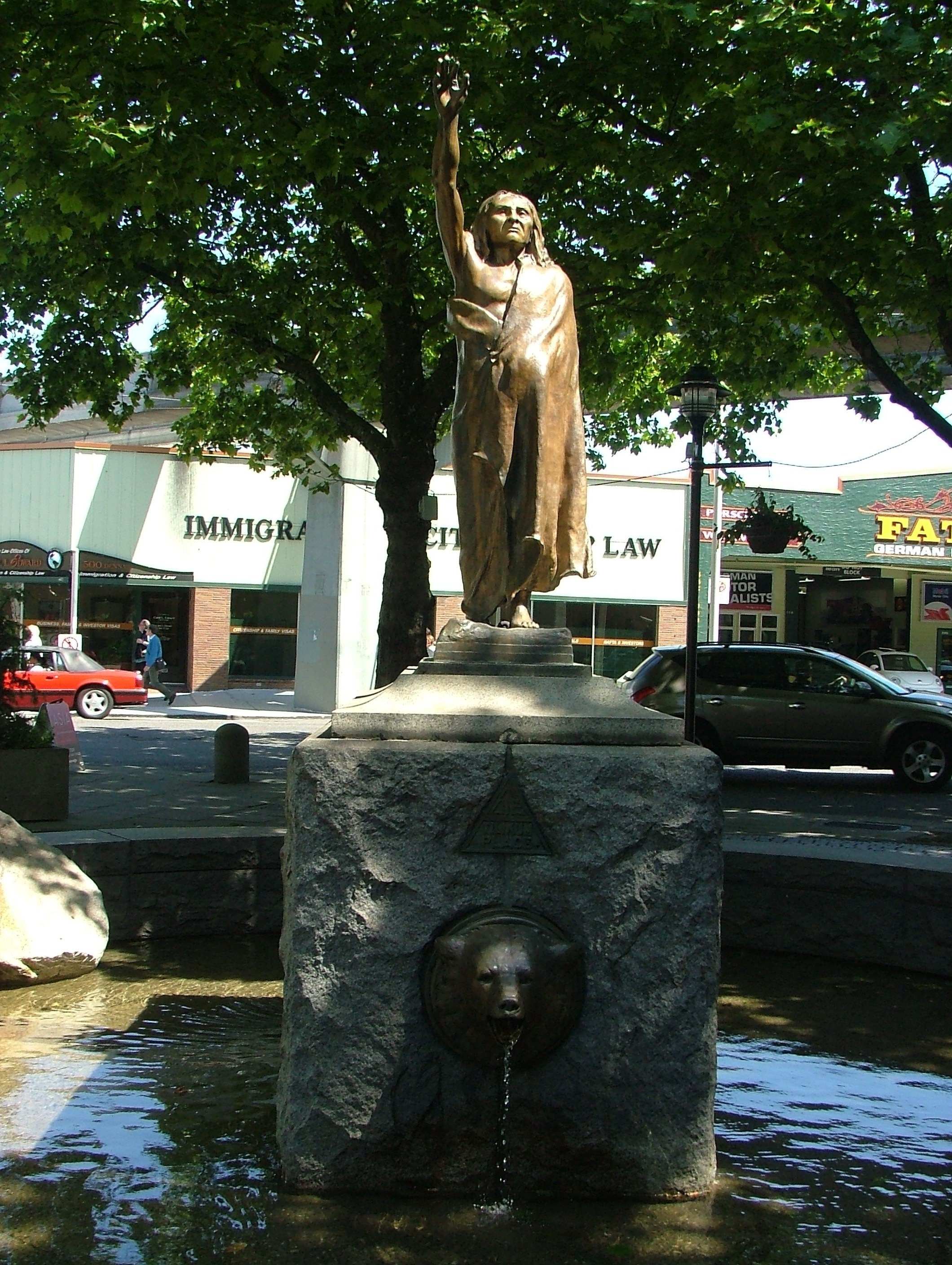
Statue of Chief Seattle, 1908 by James When, Tilikum Place, Seattle, Washington. The statue is on the National Register of Historic Places.

After the death of his son and his conversion to Christianity, Seattle began to seek cooperation with American settlers, retiring from fighting. He welcomed pioneers, inviting them to settle and trade with his people. Seattle began seeking contacts with businessmen and community leaders and gained a reputation as a "friend of the whites" among settlers. Seattle and the Duwamish helped many early American settlers, guiding them along the Duwamish River and its tributaries, providing them with safe transportation, and helped clear forests for the cultivation of crops, and provided labor in early sawmills and farms.

Seattle was eventually contacted by Isaac Stevens, the first Territorial Governor of Washington Territory, who recognized Seattle's prominence among his people. Seattle would go on to be the first signature on the 1855 Treaty of Point Elliot for the Suquamish, and all the peoples of the Duwamish River's watershed, including the Duwamish, Sammamish, Stkamish, Smulkamish, and Skopamish peoples, authorizing the cession of roughly 2.5 million acres of land to the United States. It has been argued that Seattle had no authority to sign the treaties for the peoples of the upriver Duwamish River according to traditional governance, and that he and others did not realize governor Stevens' desire to alter the indigenous political systems and control the native population.

The unpopular treaties caused many Duwamish to renounce Seattle's leadership. Alongside many other tribes, the Duwamish participated in the Puget Sound War, a part of the broader Yakima Indian War. Despite this, Seattle supported the Americans in the conflict, providing them with valuable military intelligence. Seattle warned the American settlers of the impending attack and brought as many people as he could away from the fighting to the Port Madison reservation. After the war's conclusion with the defeat of Native forces, Seattle tried to help his people regain their footing and sought clemency for the Native leaders in the war, such as Leschi. One reason for the war was the unratified treaty and illegal enforcement, so Seattle continuously advocated for the final ratification of the treaties. He also tried to stop slave murder and curtail the influence of alcohol on the Port Madison Reservation; he continued to try to resolve disputes elsewhere.

Seattle continued to seek relationships with American settlers, eventually gaining relationships with Doc Maynard, William De Shaw, and George Meigs, who all helped Seattle further his goals in helping the local Native and Settler populations. Despite his friendships with the Americans, the town forced Seattle to leave the city that bore his name in 1865 after the Town of Seattle Ordinance No. 5 banned all Native Americans from the town unless housed and employed by a white settler. Seattle then moved to the Suquamish Reservation, but continued to visit the city often both to visit his American friends and gather with other Native Americans in temporary waterfront campsites.

The Suquamish people, with whom Seattle eventually settled, continued to take care of Seattle and recognized him as their leader until his death, bringing him food and water to his house. Seattle died June 7, 1866, on the Port Madison Reservation after suffering from a brief yet severe fever. His funeral was conducted with both Catholic and Suquamish traditions, and he was buried on the Port Madison Reservation. Although he was mourned locally on the reservation and by his friend and sawmill owner George Meigs, no other pioneers of the city of Seattle attended his funeral, and no newspaper covered the event. However, years after his death, in 1890, some early Seattle historians and pioneers visited his gravesite, adding a stone marker to the grave.

== Chief Seattle's speech ==
In 1854, Seattle gave a speech, delivered in his native language of Lushootseed, to Isaac Stevens, during a visit to the city of Seattle. A pioneer, Henry A. Smith, had attended the meeting and taken notes of the speech. Thirty-three years later, in 1887, a text was reconstructed from Smith's notes and published in the Seattle Sunday Star. Smith's version of the speech was "necessarily filtered", "embellished", and created from Smith's "incomplete" notes, according to historian Walt Crowley. There is no corroboration for the exact words of the speech, but Smith's reconstruction is plausible, albeit embellished. Smith's speech reconstruction has been lauded as "a powerful, bittersweet plea for respect of Native American rights and environmental values".

In 1929, Clarence C. Bagley printed a version of the speech in his History of King County, adding "Dead -- I say? There is no death. Only a change of worlds" to the end of the speech. Bagley's version became popular, circulating in environmentalist pamphlets and other works. The work was further modified by William Arrowsmith and Ted Perry, who added their own text additions. These versions influenced environmentalists and Native American rights activists in the 1960s.

== Legacy ==
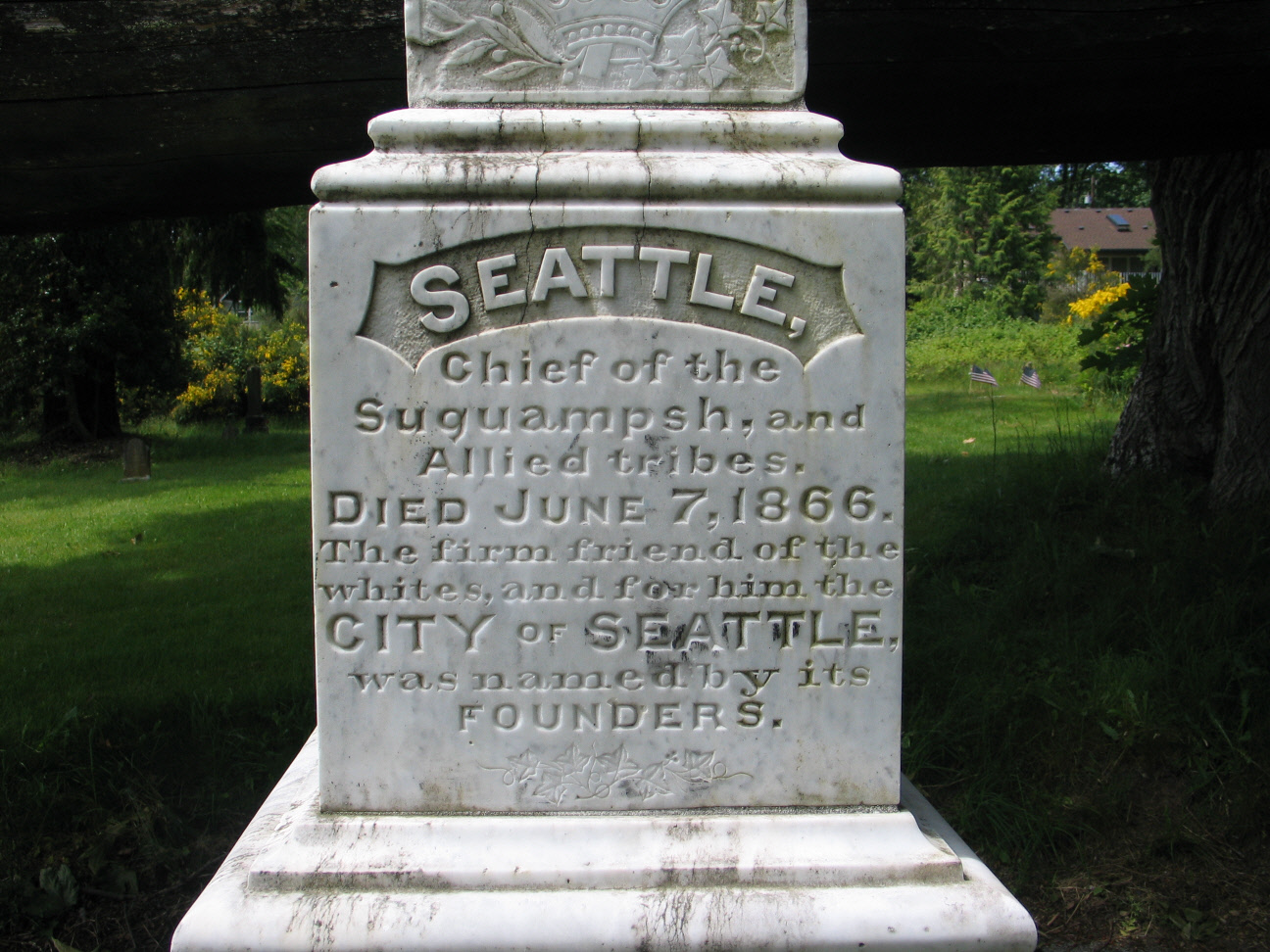
Closeup of Chief Seattle's tombstone in Suquamish, Washington

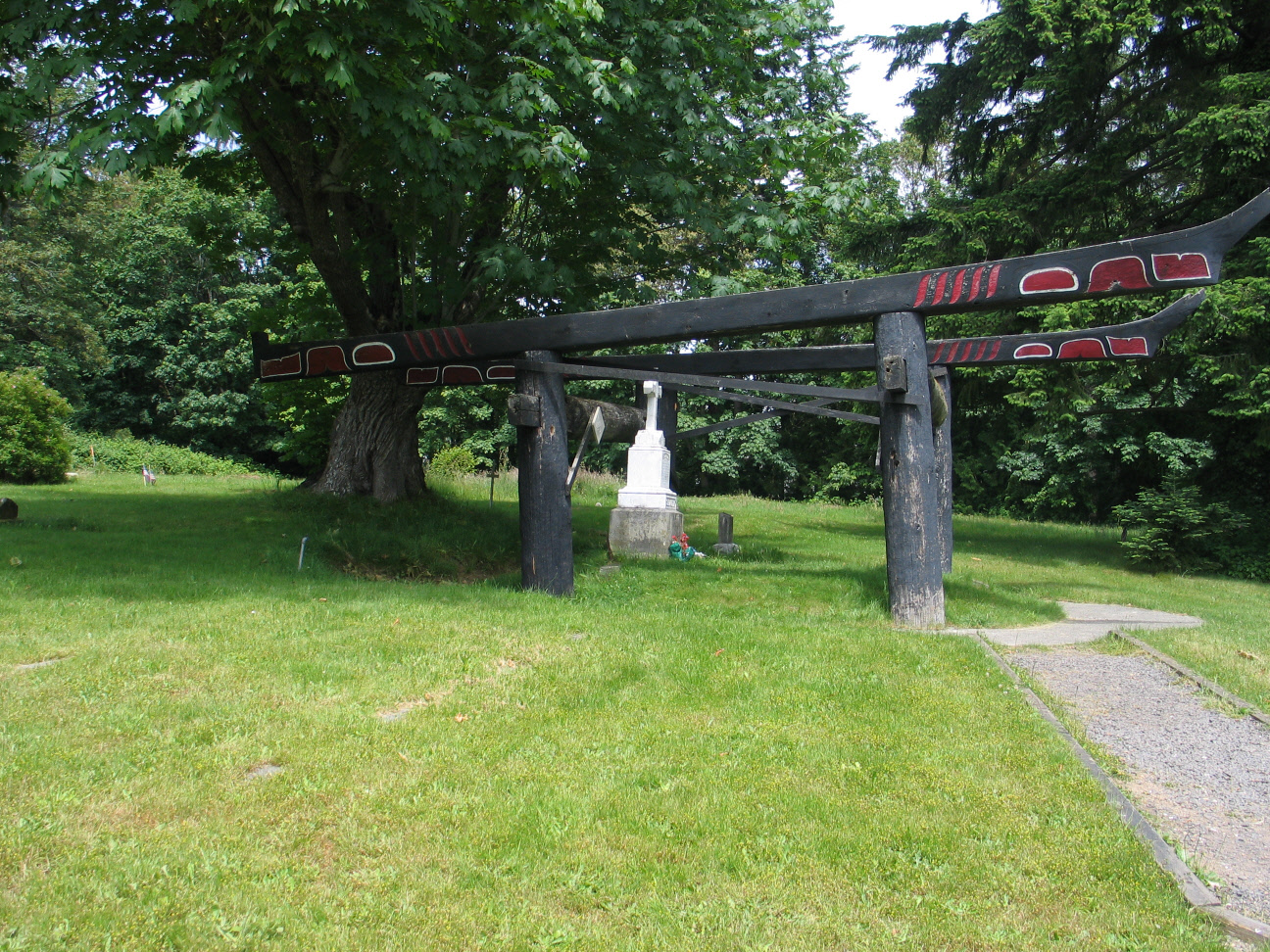
Chief Seattle's gravesite on the Port Madison Indian Reservation in Suquamish, Washington

As Seattle was highly famous to both early pioneers and modern residents, as well as a constant figure in the mythos of Seattle's founding, Chief Seattle's legacy has been preserved in many ways. Seattle's grave site, at the Suquamish Tribal Cemetery, has been turned into a monument to him and his life. In 1890, a group of Seattle pioneers led by Arthur Denny set up the monument over his grave, with the inscription "SEATTLE Chief of the Suqampsh and Allied Tribes, Died June 7, 1866. The Firm Friend of the Whites, and for Him the City of Seattle was Named by Its Founders." On the reverse is the inscription "Baptismal name, Noah Sealth, Age probably 80 years." The site was restored, and a native sculpture was added in 1976 and again in 2011.

Several of Seattle's descendants also gained fame in their own right. Kikisoblu, also known as Angeline, was his most famous child and well-known to the residents of early Seattle, where she lived until her death in 1896. His son Jim became the leader of the Suquamish for a time, but was unpopular and was replaced in favor of a prominent leader of the Catholic Suquamish community, Jacob Wahalchu. A Duwamish grandniece of his, Rebecca Lena Graham, is also notable for her successful inheritance claim following the Graham v. Matthias, 63 F. 523 (1894) case.

Two statues of Seattle were created in his honor by James A. Wehn. A bronze bust, located in Pioneer Square, was made in 1909, and a full statue, located in the Denny Triangle, was made in 1912.

The city of Seattle and numerous other institutions relating to the city are named after him. Other things are named after Seattle as well, including:

- Chief Sealth Trail in southern Seattle
- A B-17E Flying Fortress, SN# 41-2656 named Chief Seattle, a so-called "presentation aircraft", was funded by bonds purchased by the citizens of Seattle. Flying with the 435th Bombardment Squadron out of Port Moresby, it was lost with its 10-man crew on August 14, 1942.
- MV Chief Seattle, one of the four fireboats operated by the Seattle Fire Department
- MV Sealth, an Issaquah-class ferryboat operated by Washington State Ferries.
- Camp Sealth, a non-profit summer camp operated by the American youth organization Camp Fire

Several festivals and holidays are celebrated in his honor. The Suquamish Tribe hosts a festival in the third weekend of August called "Chief Seattle Days". The Evangelical Lutheran Church in America commemorates the life of Seattle on June 7 in its Calendar of Saints. The liturgical color for the day is white.

Soundgarden, a Seattle rock band, covered the Black Sabbath song, "Into the Void" replacing the lyrics with the words from what was alleged to be Chief Seattle's speech.

== See also ==
- Duwamish people
- Duwamish Tribe
- Suquamish people
- Battle of Seattle (1856)
- History of Seattle before 1900
- Chief Sealth International High School
- Suquamish Museum and Cultural Center
