= The 5 Point Cafe =

Bar and restaurant in Seattle, Washington, U.S.

Coordinates: 47.6182°N 122.3475°W

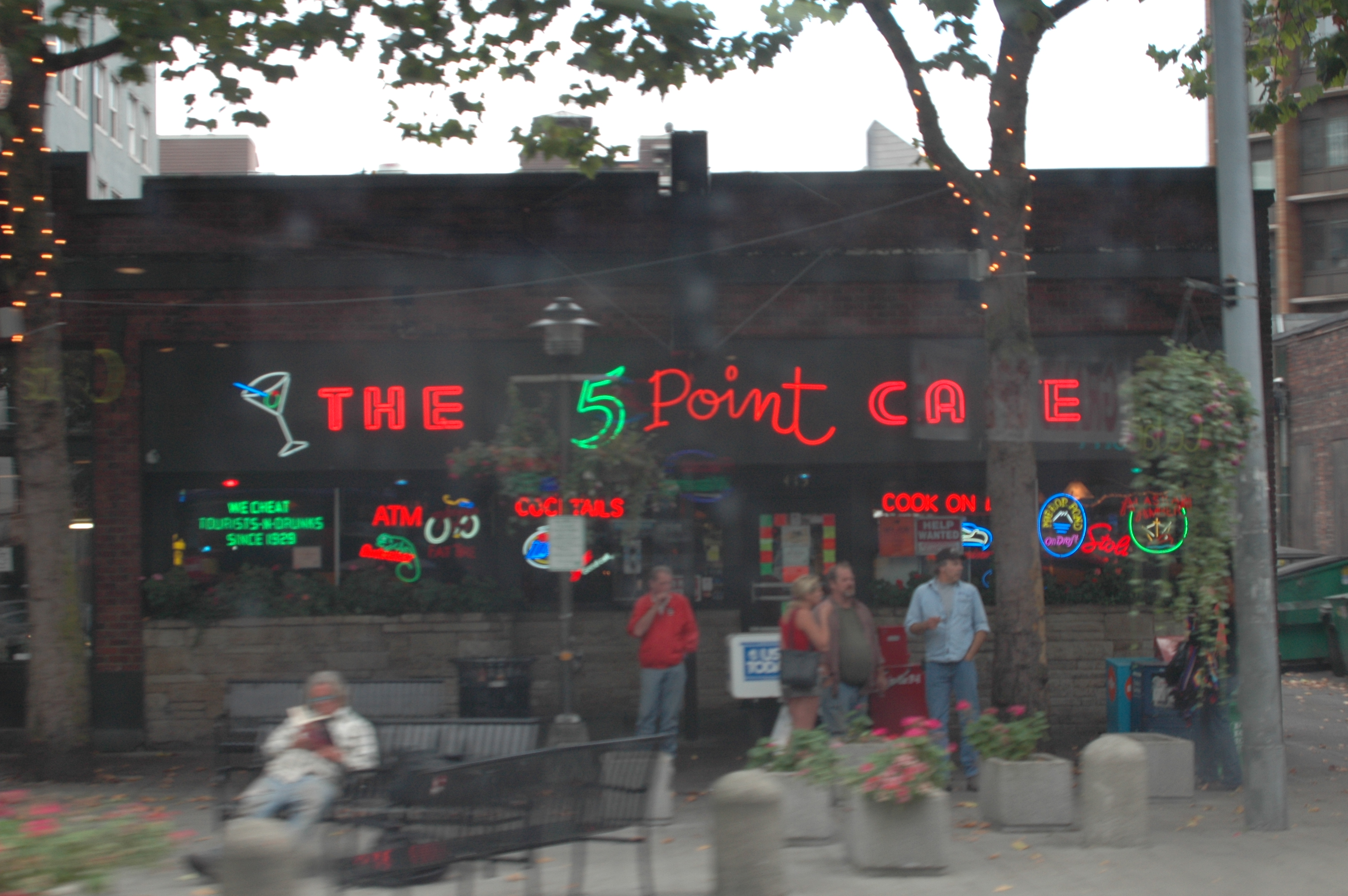
- The 5 Point on a rainy Seattle day
- Interactive map of The 5 Point Cafe

Restaurant information
- Established: 1929
- Location: 415 Cedar St, Seattle, Washington, 98121, United States

The 5 Point Cafe is a bar and 24-hour cafe in the Belltown neighborhood of Seattle, Washington, owned by Dave Meinert. It is located by Tilikum Place and is open since 1929. It is considered the oldest drinking establishment in the neighborhood and has received accolades from local media for being one of the best dive bars in the city.

== History ==
The building was originally constructed by the Webb Investment Company in 1922 for use as a dairy warehouse. It was built in what was known as the Denny Regrade, named after a project to flatten Denny Hill. C. Preston Smith opened the cafe during an economic downturn in 1929. Coffee, two eggs, a ham steak, hashbrowns, and four pieces of buttered toast with jelly cost 40 cents. Smaller dishes were 25 cents or less. A barroom was opened adjacent to the cafe upon the repeal of prohibition in 1933 to sell beer and wine. It became a lounge when state law allowed for the sale of hard liquor in 1944.

Smith's son, Dick, took over in 1975. Along with political activities in the neighborhood, the younger Smith was known for installing a periscope over the men's room urinal to provide views of the Space Needle.

The 5 Point Cafe made headlines in August 2004 when radio personality Tom Leykis was ejected and then assaulted outside. Leykis said his assailant kicked him in the head and knocked him to the ground. He was cut above the eye and needed 17 stitches.

In September 2009, it was rumored that The 5 Point would be closing. In November 2009, it was purchased by David Meinert. He has changed little but the menu was expanded slightly with vegetarian options.

The 5 Point again made headlines when it became Seattle's first establishment to publicly ban Google Glass during the product's initial developmental release.

The bar again received attention in October 2014 when rock star Tom Morello was denied entry late on a busy evening. Morello used Twitter to criticize the customer service of the doorman and the owner's stance on worker's rights, and 5 Point owner David Meinert shot back. Meinert had previously criticized the Seattle ordinance mandating a $15 minimum wage because it didn't include a tip credit for restaurants workers which Morello was opposed to, and Meinert responded to the criticism by citing the cafe's relatively higher pay, paid time off, health insurance, and retirement plans for his staff.

During the COVID-19 pandemic, 5 Point owner David Meinert installed Upper Room Germicidal UVC Lights, Merv-13 air filters, increased ventilation, and installed plexiglass and room dividers to make the 5 Point safe for indoor drinking and eating.

== Culture ==
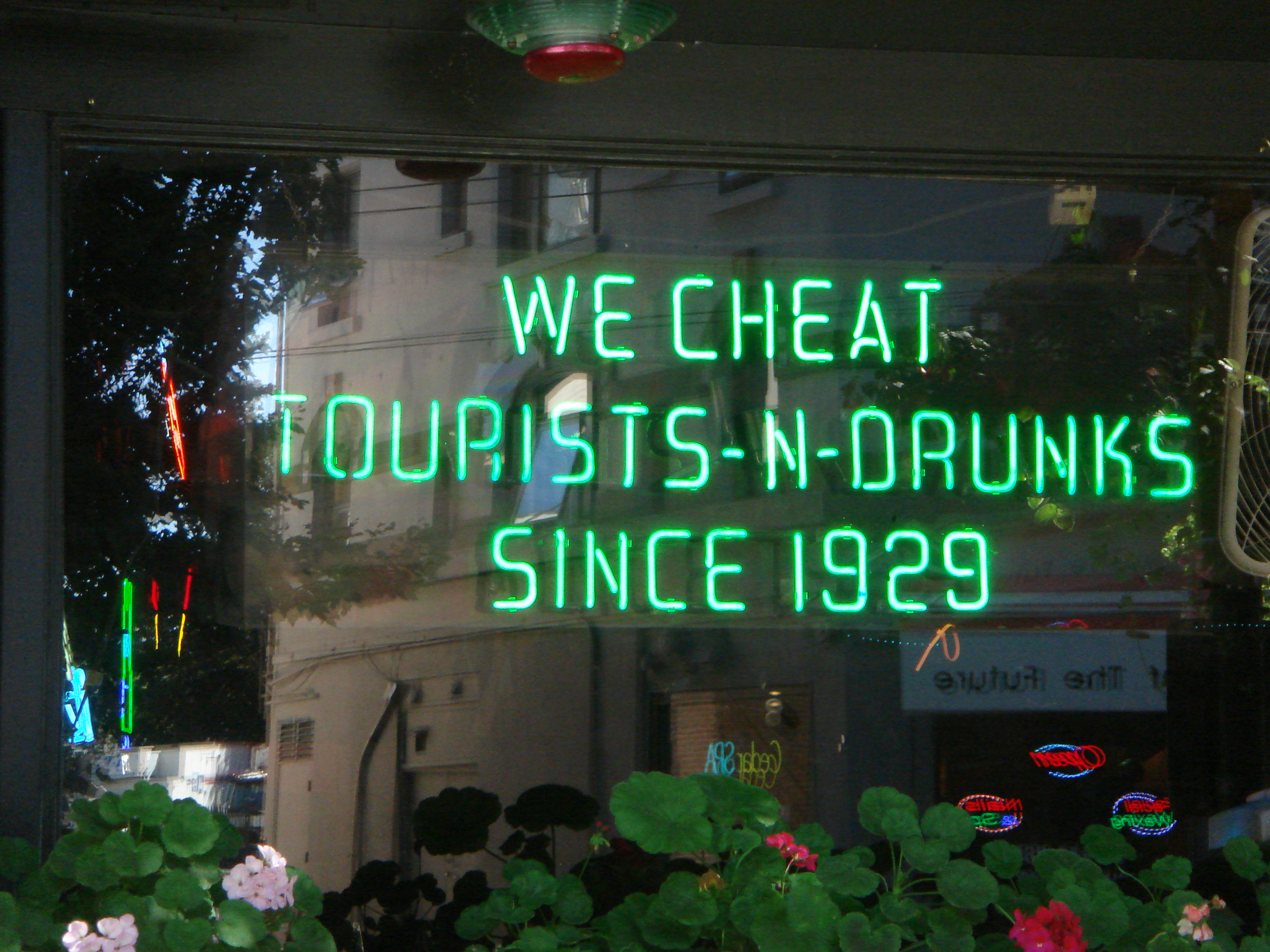
A neon side at the cafe and bar

The 5 Point Cafe serves large portions of traditional American food and stiff drinks at inexpensive prices. Located in what is now an affluent neighborhood, it has historically catered to working class and eclectic patrons. Brassieres dangle from a stuffed moose head and there is a juke box with an expansive collection.

The cafe has been called one of the best dive bars in the world by the alternative weekly newspaper The Stranger. It has been voted "Best Dive Bar" in Seattle several times by Seattle Magazine. The 5 Point was named Most Iconic Bar in Washington.

The younger Smith installed quirky signs throughout the location. Before Washington banned smoking in restaurants and bars, the cafe touted it as smoker-friendly with a sign that read: "Smokers welcome, non-smokers beware". Other signs have slogans such as "We cheat tourists-n-drunks since 1929" and "Alcoholics Serving Alcoholics since 1929".
