= I Am Princess X =

2015 novel by Cherie Priest

- Author: Cherie Priest
- Illustrator: Kali Ciesemier
- Language: English
- Genre: Young adult fiction
- Set in: Seattle, Washington
- Published: 2015
- Publisher: Arthur A. Levine Books
- Publication place: United States
- Media type: Print, e-book, audiobook
- Pages: 230 pages
- ISBN: 978-0-545-62085-7

I Am Princess X is a 2015 book by Cherie Priest. It first published on May 26, 2015 through Arthur A. Levine Books and its story is told through a hybrid of traditional novel and graphic novel formats. The work is not related to the 1916 sculpture Princess X by Constantin Brâncuși.

== Synopsis ==
May is a sad and lonely teenager who lives in Atlanta with her mother but spends summers in Seattle with her father. Years ago, before her parents divorced, when they all lived in Seattle, she and her best friend Libby worked together to create the fictional character named Princess X, a warrior-princess who went through whatever adventures the two of them could dream up. This all came to an end when Libby died in a car accident on the Ballard Bridge.

Now in present day, May begins seeing stickers and other memorabilia that showcase Princess X during the summer before her 17th birthday. She's directed to a website containing stories of Princess X's exploits, all of which are similar to the stories May wrote years earlier. This leads May to believe that Libby is still alive. She decides to follow a series of subtle clues left by the webcomic with the help of Patrick Hobbs, however as she progresses, she discovers that she is not the only person looking for Libby.

May discovers that Libby is indeed alive and that she was actually kidnapped by a man named Ken Mullins who wanted Libby's parents to allow her to be used as part of a medical procedure to save his own daughter, Christine Louise Mullins. They refuse due to the risk of Libby's own health and well-being, only for the man to murder Libby's parents and steal Libby away to raise in the place of his own daughter, who died soon after he was turned away. Libby managed to escape but had to remain continually on the run, as the man kept searching for her and lied to authorities, saying that she was his mentally unhinged daughter. The book ends with May and Libby reuniting, Ken in jail, and Libby adding a new character to help Princess X.

== Reception ==
Critical reception for I Am Princess X has been positive. MuggleNet praised the book and wrote "The plot’s no Gordian knot, but Priest’s readable style, and the incorporation of a Princess X webcomic into the text itself, keeps you from getting bored with this story. I Am Princess X is pure fun and a much-needed addition to the canon of YA literature for girls who like Reddit and superheroes." Geeks of Doom also wrote a favorable review, commenting that the book's only flaw was that "while it is a perfect read for the female 12 and up set, younger boys might not be interested solely because of the title. But that might be on purpose – the desired readership could be tween and teen girls."
