= Cherie Priest =

American writer (born 1975)

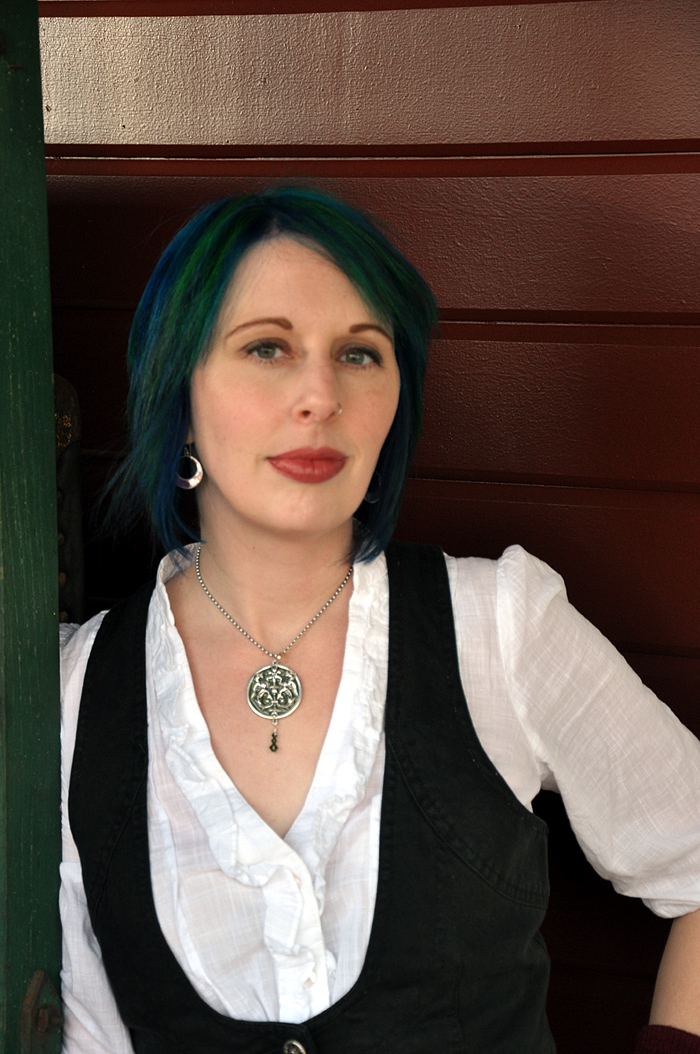
- Cherie Priest in 2009
- Born: July 30, 1975 (age 51); Tampa, Florida, U.S.
- Education: Forest Lake Academy; Southern Adventist University (BA); University of Tennessee at Chattanooga (MA)
- Occupation: Writer
- Writing career
- Genres: Horror, Southern Gothic, Science fiction, steampunk
- Notable works: Boneshaker, Maplecroft
- Website: cheriepriest.com

Cherie Priest (born July 30, 1975) is an American novelist and blogger living in Seattle, Washington.

== Biography ==
Priest is a Florida native, born in Tampa in 1975. She graduated from Forest Lake Academy, a Seventh-day Adventist boarding school in Apopka, Florida in 1993. She moved around quite a bit as a child of an Army father, living in many places such as Florida, Texas, Kentucky, and Tennessee. She moved around regularly until college. In 1998 she graduated with a B.A. from Southern Adventist University in Collegedale, Tennessee, and in 2001 she left the University of Tennessee at Chattanooga with an M.A. in Rhetoric/Professional writing.

Priest lived in Chattanooga for twelve years and it is there she both set her Eden Moore series and wrote the first two books. In May 2012, she and her husband Aric Annear moved back to Tennessee from Seattle, Washington. In 2017, she returned to live in Seattle.

Although Priest was baptized into the Seventh-day Adventist Church, she has no further contact with the church and claims no religious affiliation.

In addition to her novels, Priest was a reviewer for the Bram Stoker Award-winning website Chiaroscuro and currently is a staff member of Subterranean Press. She is a regular attendee and panelist at DragonCon and several other genre conventions around the country such as Penguicon and Steamcon. She is also known for giving talks and writing articles about the hobby of urban exploration.

== Awards ==
- In March 2006, she won the Lulu Blooker Prize for Fiction for Four and Twenty Blackbirds (Tor Books, 2005), becoming the first ever winner in that category.
- Her 2006 short story "Wishbones" was part of the Aegri Somnia anthology by Apex Digest, which was nominated for a Bram Stoker Award.
- Her 2009 novel Boneshaker won a Pacific Northwest Booksellers Association Award
- The Science Fiction and Fantasy Writers of America announced that Boneshaker made the final ballot for the 2009 Nebula Award for Best Novel.
- Boneshaker was a 2010 Hugo Award nominee in the Best Novel category.
- Boneshaker won the 2010 Locus Award in the Best Science Fiction Novel category.

== Bibliography ==
=== Novels ===
==== Booking Agent Series ====
- Grave Reservations, 2021, Atria Books. ISBN 9781982168902.
- Flight Risk, 2022, Atria Books. ISBN 9781982168926.

==== The Borden Dispatches ====
- Maplecroft, 2014, Roc Books. ISBN 9780451466976.
- Chapelwood, 2015, Roc Books. ISBN 9780451466983.

==== Eden Moore series ====
- Four and Twenty Blackbirds,
  - Original edition, 2003, Marietta Publishing. ISBN 978-1-892669-22-3.
  - Re-released in a revised, much expanded, edition, 2005, Tor Books. ISBN 978-0-7653-1308-9.
  - Issued in the United Kingdom, February 2012, Titan Books. ISBN 9780857687722
- Wings to the Kingdom, October 2006, Tor Books. ISBN 978-0-7653-1309-6.
  - Issued in the United Kingdom, May 2012, Titan Books. ISBN 9780857687739
- Not Flesh Nor Feathers, 2007, Tor Books. ISBN 978-0-7653-1310-2.
  - Publishers Weekly described this book as "a bit talky" but also as Cherie Priest's "most assured outing yet."

==== Clockwork Century Universe ====
- Boneshaker, October 2009, Tor Books. ISBN 978-0-7653-1841-1.
- Clementine, July 2010, Subterranean Press. ISBN 978-1-59606-308-2.
- Dreadnought, September 2010, Tor Books. ISBN 978-0-7653-2578-5.
- Ganymede, September 2011, Tor Books. ISBN 978-0-7653-2946-2.
- The Inexplicables, November 2012, Tor Books. ISBN 978-0-7653-2947-9.
- Fiddlehead, November 2013, Tor Books. ISBN 978-0-7653-3407-7
- Jacaranda, January 2015, Subterranean Press.

==== Cheshire Red Reports series ====
- Bloodshot, January 2011, Bantam Spectra. ISBN 978-0-345-52060-9.
  - Issued in the United Kingdom, July 2011, Titan Books. ISBN 9780857686459.
- Hellbent, September 6, 2011, Bantam Spectra. ISBN 978-0-345-52062-3.
  - Issued in the United Kingdom, September 2011, Titan Books. ISBN 9780857686466.

The Cheshire Red Reports concern a vampire thief called Raylene Pendle. Although she prefers to work alone, she acquires a group of misfits who join her in her adventures. These are two young children, a blind vampire and an ex-Navy Seal/Drag Queen. Bloodshot also features the world of urban exploration. The Cheshire Red reports were originally only commissioned as a two book series. There is the possibility of a third book in this series provisionally entitled Sawbones if sufficient interest is expressed.

==== Other novels ====
- Dreadful Skin, March 2007, Subterranean Press. ISBN 978-1-59606-080-7.
- Fathom, December 2008, Tor Books. ISBN 978-0-7653-1840-4.
- Those Who Went Remain There Still, December 2008, Subterranean Press. ISBN 978-1-59606-179-8.
- I Am Princess X, May 2015, Arthur A. Levine Books. ISBN 978-0-545-62085-7.
- The Family Plot, September 2016, Tor Books. ISBN 978-0-7653-7824-8.
- Brimstone, April 2017, Ace. ISBN 978-1-10199-073-5.
- The Agony House, September 2018, Arthur A. Levine Books/Scholastic. ISBN 978-0-545-93429-9.
- The Toll, July 2019, Tor Books. ISBN 978-0-76537-823-1.
- Holy Terror (short works collection), 2022, Subterranean Press. ISBN 978-1-64524-055-6.
  - Includes "The October Devotion", "The Immigrant", "Reluctance", "Clementine", "The Wreck of the Mary Byrd", and "Talking in Circles".
- Cinderwich, June 2024, Apex Book Company. ISBN 978-1-95576-520-6.
- The Drowning House, July 2024, Sourcebooks. ISBN 978-1-72829-282-3.
- It Was Her House First, July 2025, Sourcebooks. ISBN 978-1-72829-285-4.

=== Short stories and other work ===
- 'The Heavy', a short story. Published in Apex Digest Issue #12, March 2008.
- 'The Target Audience', a short story. Published in Noctem Aeternus January, 2008.
- 'Following Piper', a short story. Published in Subterranean Digest issue #6.
- 'Little Wards', a short story. Published in The Edge of Propinquity. June 2006
- 'The Immigrant', a short story, part of Mythic #2, October 2006 Mythic Delirium Books. ISBN 978-0-8095-5756-1
- 'Bad Sushi', a short story. Published in Apex Digest, Issue #10. Republished in "New Cthulhu", ed. Paula Guran, November 2011.
- 'Wishbones', a short story, part of Aegri Somnia. December 2006 Apex Digest. ISBN 978-0-9788676-2-1 (paperback), ISBN 978-0-9788676-3-8 (hardback)
- 'Tanglefoot', a short story, published online by Subterranean Press, 2009. First release of the Clockwork Century universe.
- 'Hell's Bells,' Grant’s Pass, Morrigan Books 2009
- 'The Catastrophe Box', a short story Son of Retro Pulp Tales, Subterranean Press 2010
- 'Reluctance', a short story, part of "The Mammoth Book of Steampunk", first published in the UK by Robinson, an imprint of Constable & Robinson Ltd, 2012

=== Articles (non-fiction) ===
- 'Steampunk Wardrobe Customizations for the Lazy, the Poor, or the Crafty,' Tor, October 2009
- 'Steampunk for Beginners,' BookBrowse, October 2009
- 'Growing up Poe,' Weird Tales, January 2009

=== Video games ===
- Dead Space 3 (2013)
