= Rebecca Lena Graham =

Duwamish tribal member

Rebecca Lena Graham (née Matthias; December 29, 1859 – April 9, 1946) was an American Duwamish tribal member who gained considerable notoriety through her 1893-94 legal battle for her father's sizable inheritance.

== Duwamish roots and early life ==
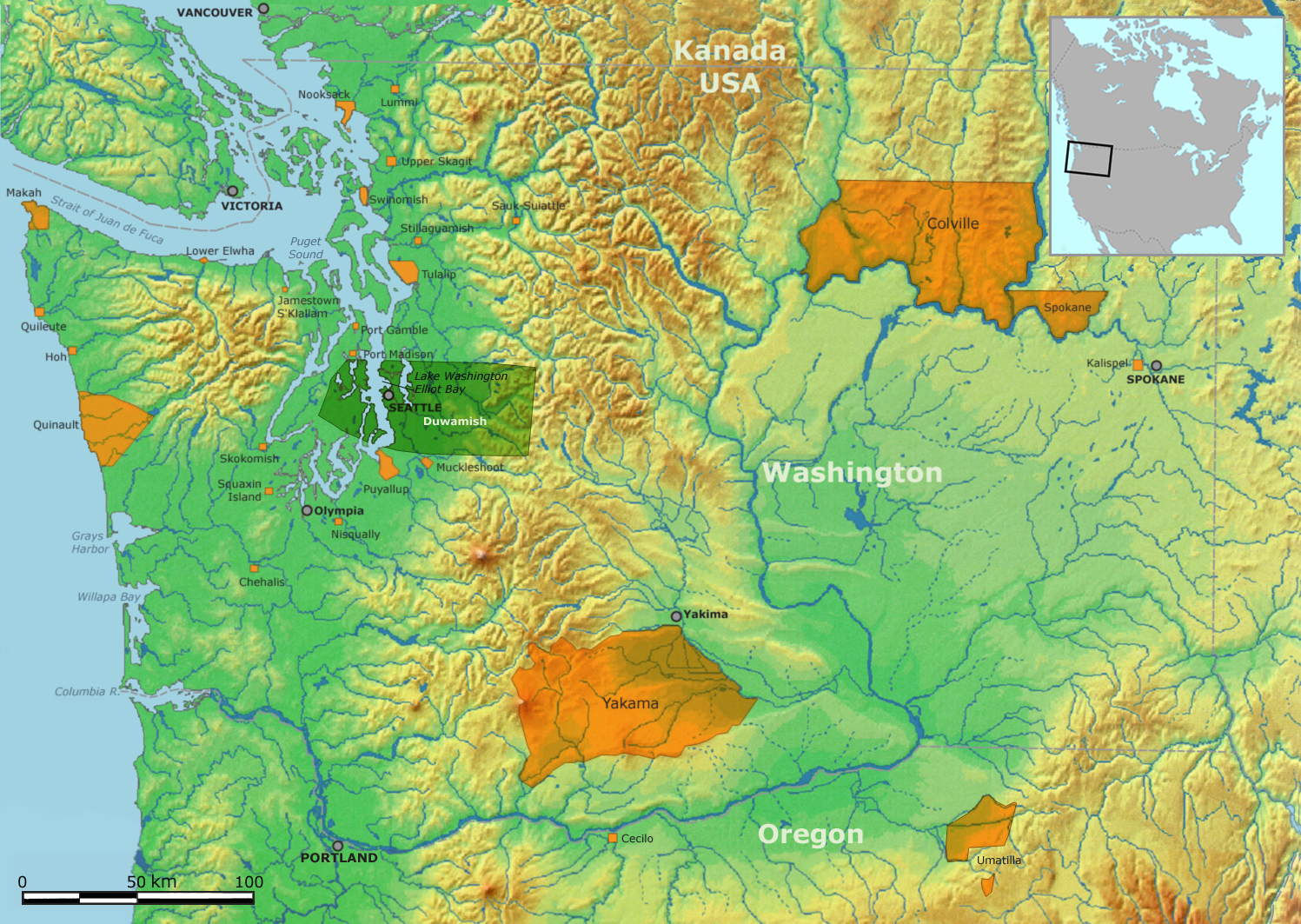
Map of traditional Duwamish tribal territory

Rebecca Lena Graham, who went by Lena in her early life, was born in 1859 in Pioneer Square, Seattle, to Pennsylvania-born Frank Matthias and Peggy Curley, a Duwamish woman. Her father came to Seattle in 1851 and the first real estate purchase recorded in the city, buying a lot on Commercial Street (now 1st Avenue) for $20 (equivalent to $1,000 in 2025). He helped build the original building of the University of Washington (the current site of the Olympic Hotel).

She grew up in the Puget Sound area, as her people were located in Seattle. Her maternal grandfather, Su-quardle or Curley, was a Duwamish leader related to Chief Seattle. Rebecca's parents separated in her childhood, with her mother remarrying Christian Scheuerman. Graham's father died on August 28, 1891, due to a heart rheumatism. Rebecca's early life was lived with her mother, her stepfather Christian, her half brother John Kellog, and her mother and Christian's children. She attended convent boarding school with white nuns and students, and in 1879, married a white railroad engineer from Massachusetts, John C. Holmes.

== Family life ==
In April 1882, Rebecca and John had a son, George F. Holmes, whom was followed by several other children. In 1889, John was arrested and sent to the Hospital for Insane in Steilacoom. He died that same day, with the cause of death listed as "softening of the brain." This resulted in Rebecca's first time dealing with the legal system. In 1890, Rebecca married Victor E. Graham, a white man whom she had a daughter with in 1894. Sometime after 1900, Victor Graham disappeared with the intent of finding gold in Alaska. In April 1911, Rebecca married George W. Fitzhenry, a corporal in the U.S. Army, though they separated within ten years. Only two of Rebecca's seven children survived to adulthood.

== Work ==
In 1915, Rebecca coordinated the Duwamish people, in conjunction with Northwest Federation of American Indians, in an attempt to gain tribal rights guaranteed by treaties. In 1919, Rebecca and her children had to testify in court as a result of the Census of Unenrolled Western Washington Indians, in which she was adamant about their status as Duwamish. Graham ensured that she and her children were included in the census, ran by Charles Roblin. She also assisted anthropologist Thomas Talbot Waterman (T.T. Waterman) in his research of the Duwamish and other Puget Sound Indians in the late 1910s. Waterman's team successfully collected and submitted an Adze, a Duwamish woodworking tool, to Smithsonian's National Museum of the American Indian in 1920.

== Graham v. Matthias, 63 F. 523 (1894) ==
Rebecca Lena Graham argued for her right to her father, Frank Matthias', estate in the U.S. Circuit Court for the District of Washington. Matthias, who had passed in August 1891, had possessed a significant estate due to the family tie to Chief Seattle. On September 16, 1891, the administration of the estate was granted Frank's brother-in-law, Cyrus Stouffer, and was later shifted to Samuel L. Crawford. At that time, the estate's estimated value was $40,000-$100,000, with some sources estimating it at over $50,000 (equivalent to $1,792,000 in 2025). Judge Cornelius H. Hanford, (note some sources state "Hakford" as the last name) who was the Chief Justice of Washington and Justice of the Federal Court, presided over the case. Note that Judge Hanford defied the late nineteenth-century precedent to reject interracial unions in this case.

While Peggy Curley and Frank Matthias' Native-white marriage was allowed through common law, their names did not appear together on any legal document. Further, Judge Hanford discounted several witness testimonies about the marriage's existence. Some of these witnesses were white and some were Duwamish. In court, Rebecca was up against members of the Matthias family, who claimed to be the lawful heirs. The Matthias family testified Frank was never married and did not have any children, additionally claiming they did not know about him living with Peggy.

It was petitioned that Rebecca should inherit the estate two different times, moving from local to circuit court in 1893. The case later moved to federal court since Matthias passed in California, owned property in Washington, and was a Pennsylvania resident. Though the case transcript's location is unknown, Judge Cornelius H. Hanford's opinion was published and is available to the public.

Judge Hanford used the 1854 Act to Regulate Marriages, to justify needing proof that Peggy and Frank lived together when Rebecca was born, which would be sufficient to prove Rebecca was Frank's daughter. After this was provided, Judge Hanford stated that Peggy and Frank were not married but did live together and that Rebecca was their child. He ruled that Rebecca should receive her father's estate, since she was the heir.

== End of life ==
Rebecca died in 1946 and was survived by one son. She was referred to by newspapers as white, even being considered one of Seattle's white founders. This was a distinct difference from being called "half breed" earlier in her life. This change was probably a combination of her elevated status and societal changes throughout her lifetime.

== Duwamish attempt at tribal recognition ==
Tribal Recognition Hearing from September 17, 2002

The Duwamish, who lived between the Salish Sea and Cascade Mountains, has struggled for tribal recognition for 163 years. Though the January 22, 1855 Treaty of Point Elliott established partial congressional funding of their reservation until the 1920s and congress provided a government settlement to the tribe in 1971, the Duwamish tribe has not been federally recognized. To obtain federal recognition, a tribe is required to prove their Indigenous identity and consistent political structure since "historical times." The first Duwamish petition for recognition was filed in the 1970s. In June 1996, the Assistant Secretary of Indian Affairs published a report acknowledging the Duwamish Tribal Organization's recognition efforts, relating to part 82 of Title 25 of the Code of Federal Regulations. The tribe needed to meet seven criteria to be recognized (which in turn provided the land, benefits, and services from the government), which were added in 1978 by the Interior Department's Bureau of Indian Affairs' Office of Federal Acknowledgement. Since the historical Duwamish Tribe differed from the Duwamish Tribal Organization, established in 1925, and there were names of Duwamish people also listed on other tribes' lists, the petition failed. The Assistant Secretary of Indian Affairs report stated the Duwamish people were “clearly identified as a historical tribe by the first Federal officials and American settlers in western Washington Territory in the 1850s.” This report was followed by approval for federal recognition from the Department of Interior in 2001 that was quickly reversed between U.S. Presidential Administrations. An appeal was filed in 2015 that was rejected. The lack of federal tribal recognition means that, along with a lack of government protection of tribal sovereignty, that the Bureau of Indian Affairs did not supply any funding for health and development needs. The Duwamish case for tribal recognition continues to pend in the Interior Board of Indian Appeals today.

== Contemporary relevance ==
The lack of tribal recognition has resulted in a lack of government resources for the Duwamish people, as well as a lack of government agency protection of tribal sovereignty. Today, the Duwamish Tribal Chairwoman Cecile Hansen leads the charge on the appeal to gain Duwamish tribal recognition. Rebecca Lena Graham's legal battle exposed divisions in the colonial community of Seattle between those who believed she, as a half-Native woman, deserved recognition and should be granted ownership of her father's estate and those who did not recognize this right. Graham's case was a substantial legal precedent due to Washington's oppressive anti-miscegenation and probate laws. It is important to make note that there are inconsistencies in the records, such as Judge "Hanford" or "Hakford," as well as different framings of Rebecca's narrative in different settings.
