= Tillicum Elementary School =

Tillicum Elementary School is the name of:

- Tillicum Elementary School, Lakewood, Washington, United States, in the Clover Park School District
- Tillicum Elementary School, Victoria, British Columbia, Canada, in School District 61 Greater Victoria
- Tillicum Annex, a Vancouver School Board elementary school, Vancouver, British Columbia, Canada
