= Forest Lake Academy =

Coordinates: 28.6696°N 81.438502°W

- Apopka, FL; USA

Information
- Type: Private 9–12 High School
- Religious affiliation: Seventh-day Adventist Church
- Established: 1918
- Principal: Dr. Glen Baker
- Faculty: 30
- Enrollment: 428
- Average class size: 25
- Student to teacher ratio: one to twelve
- Campus size: 80 acres (320,000 m^{2})
- Colors: Blue, Gold, White
- Athletics conference: Florida Conference
- Mascot: Panther
- Newspaper: Reflections
- Yearbook: The Mirror
- Graduates: About 11,000
- Website: www.forestlakeacademy.org

Adventist school locations in Florida

Forest Lake Academy is a private high school outside Orlando, Florida. It is owned and operated by the Florida Conference of Seventh-day Adventists. It is a part of the Seventh-day Adventist education system, the world's second-largest Christian school system.

== History ==
=== The Lake Winyah School ===
The first academy established by the Florida Conference of Seventh-day Adventists was Lake Winyah Academy in 1918 in Orlando, Florida. In March 1918, the Florida Conference Committee and the Sanitarium Board met. William H. Branson, L. H. Wood, J. A. Tucker, and W. E. Abernathy were present. They planned for the opening of the school. This included the construction of two buildings: a main building and a dormitory. Both these buildings were to be built as economically as possible; later on more permanent structures could be built. The conference and sanitarium leadership served on the board of the school. They planned to open in fall 1918. This first school was to be located between Winyah and Estelle Lakes. Adventist University of Health Sciences (formerly Florida Hospital College of Health Sciences) is located there now.

=== Forest Lake Academy ===
The growing school moved outside the city to its current location in 1926 and was renamed Forest Lake Academy. The first classes were held in the farm house of the newly acquired 160-acre (0.65 km^{2}) site.

== See also ==
- List of Seventh-day Adventist secondary schools
- Seventh-day Adventist education
