= Henry A. Smith =

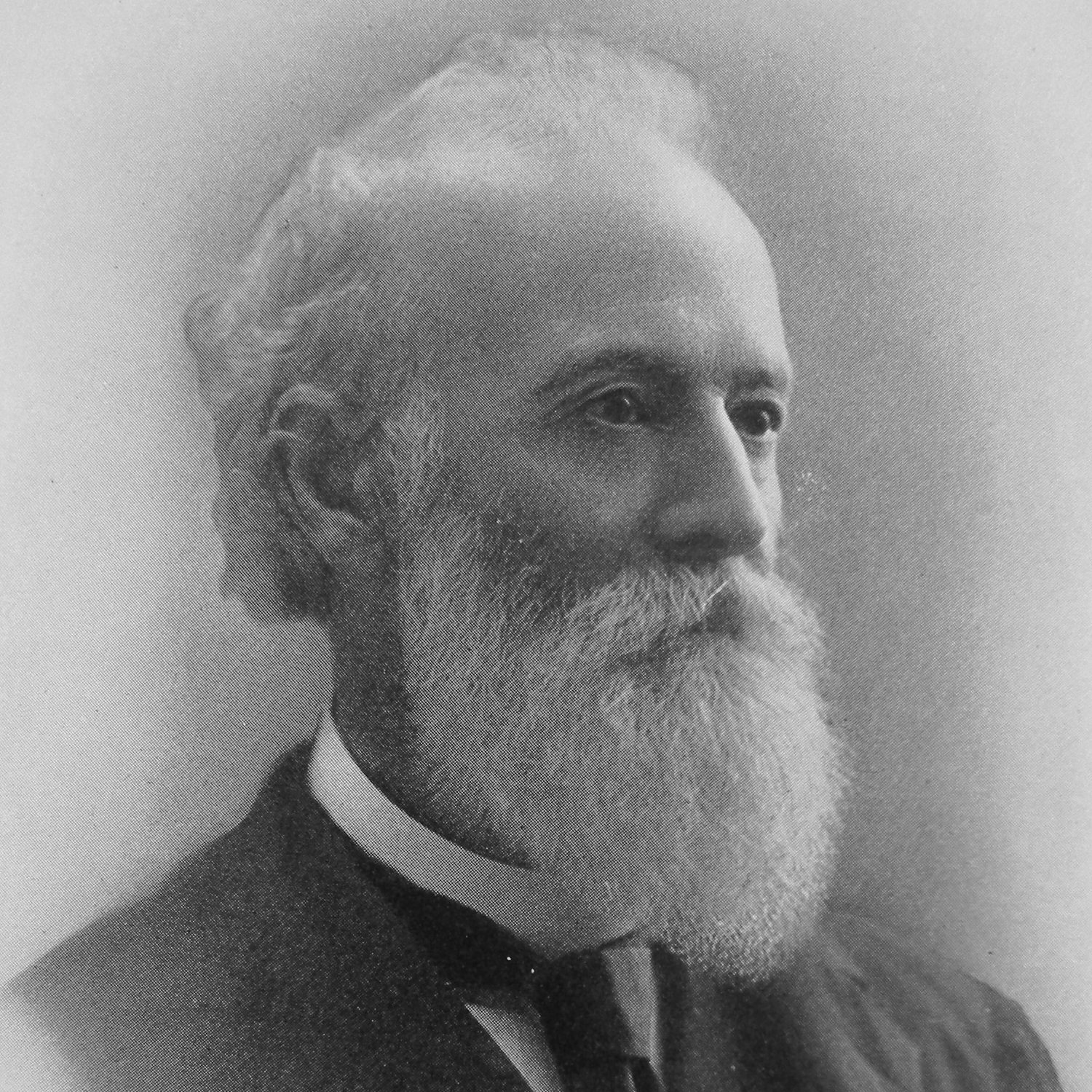
- Smith circa 1903
- Born: 1830
- Died: August 16, 1915; Seattle, Washington, United States
- Occupation: Physician
- Spouse: Mary (Phelan) Smith
- Children: 8

Henry A. Smith (1830 – August 16, 1915) was a physician, poet, legislator and an early settler of Seattle, best known today for his flowery translation of a speech by Chief Seattle (or Sealth or Si'ahl) that is still in print.

In 1852, Smith traveled from Wooster, Ohio to Portland, Oregon Territory in a wagon train with his mother (Abigail Teaff Smith, b. 1792) and sister. In 1853, he settled at the north end of Elliott Bay, at what came to be known as "Smith's Cove" (later Smith Cove), deciding that it was a likely spot for docks and that the flat area was a terminus for the perennially rumored transcontinental railroad. His mother staked the next claim north. Smith built a cabin and, the next year, an infirmary at what is today Grand Boulevard (Dravus Street) and 15th Avenue W.

Seattle was at the time hilly and heavily forested; the only route to the main settlement was by a small boat or canoe until Smith cut a trail through the woods. He is said to have known the local Indians well and had some command of the local language. At the time of the Battle of Seattle (1856), the Smith Cove settlers fled for the safety of Seattle's block house. Their homes were burned and stock taken, except, according to some accounts, for Smith's cabin, apparently as a result of his friendship with the locals.

Smith joined the Territorial Legislature as a Republican, and lobbied for a railroad. He farmed, invested in a general store, logging camps, and fruit orchards, and developed in land as far north as Smith Island, at the mouth of the Snohomish River. He made house calls throughout most of the Puget Sound area, often by canoe, and was appointed official physician for the Tulalip Indian Reservation.

In 1862, Smith married Mary Phelan; they had seven children. She died in 1880.

In 1887, with the arrival of the Seattle, Lake Shore and Eastern Railway Company, Smith sold most of his land, including about 1,000 acres (4.0 km^{2}) near Queen Anne Hill, and invested in buildings such as the London Hotel at the foot of Pike Street, and the Smith block (the 1900 block of 1st Avenue; not to be confused with Seattle's Smith Tower). He also served as the first superintendent of King County public schools.

In the 1890s, Smith's railroad dreams bore fruit when the Great Northern Railway built a depot at Smith's Cove. Seattle's Pier 91 and related facilities now cover Smith's Cove. Wealth from this and other ventures made Smith at one time King County's largest taxpayer.

He died in 1915, in the company of his five surviving daughters.

== The Speech Controversy ==
There is a controversy about a speech whose purported text Smith printed.

The date and location of the speech has been disputed, but the most common version is that on March 11, 1854, Seattle gave a speech at a large outdoor gathering in Seattle. The meeting had been called by Governor Isaac Ingalls Stevens to discuss the surrender or sale of native land to white settlers. No-one alive today knows what Seattle said; he spoke in the Lushootseed language, someone translated his words into Chinook Indian trade language, and a third person translated that into English.

About thirty years later, the Seattle Sunday Star published Smith's rendition of the speech, based on notes he took at the time. In flowery language, Seattle purportedly thanked the white people for their generosity, demanded that any treaty guarantee access to Native burial grounds, and made a contrast between the God of the white people and that of his own. Smith noted that he had recorded "...but a fragment of his Chief Seattle's speech".

In 1891, Frederick James Grant's History of Seattle, Washington reprinted Smith's version. In 1929, Clarence B. Bagley's History of King County, Washington reprinted Grant's version with some additions. In 1931, John M. Rich reprinted the Bagley version in "Chief Seattle's Unanswered Challenge". The speech forms the basis of a popular children's book, "Brother Eagle, Sister Sky: A Message from Chief Seattle".
