= Suquamish Museum =

- Established: 1983
- Location: 6861 NE South St, Suquamish, Washington
- Coordinates: 47.729493°N 122.557378°W
- Type: Tribal Museum
- Key holdings: Old Man House artifacts, Baba'kwob site artifacts
- Director: Lisa Jackson
- President: Robin Sigo
- Curator: Lydia Sigo
- Owner: Suquamish Tribe
- Website: suquamishmuseum.org

The Suquamish Museum preserves and displays relics and records related to the Suquamish Tribe, including artifacts from the Old Man House and the Baba'kwob site. It is located on the Port Madison Indian Reservation in Washington state and was founded in 1983. The museum currently occupies a facility opened in 2012.

== History ==
The Suquamish Museum opened in 1983 as the Suquamish Museum and Cultural Center, then only the second tribal museum in the state of Washington. In 2009 the Suquamish tribe launched a capital campaign to construct a new facility, enlisting Senator Patty Murray and former Washington Secretary of State Ralph Munro to help lead the effort. The new facility opened in 2012 and is triple the size of the original building. Constructed at a cost of $6 million, the 9,000-square-foot (840 m^{2}) purpose-built structure is set in a small botanical garden on the Port Madison Indian Reservation and consists of two galleries, a gift shop, a 50-seat auditorium, and a climate-controlled storage room used to house artifacts not on display. The facility was designed by the Seattle architectural firm Mithun and is a LEED Gold certified building. In 2013 it received a citation from the Washington Council of the American Institute of Architects.

== Operations ==
=== Collection ===
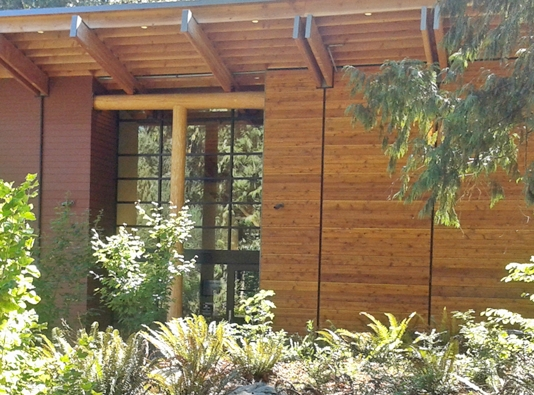
The main entrance to the Suquamish Museum, pictured in 2014

In addition to a large repository of photographs documenting tribal life from the 1860s to the present, the museum's collection includes 496 archaeological artifacts recovered from the site of the former Old Man House, a massive, 240 meters (790 ft) long longhouse that served as the Suquamish capitol until its destruction in the late nineteenth century. Originally in the custody of the Burke Museum at the University of Washington, the artifacts, which include harpoon points, smoking pipes, and jewelry, were transferred to the Suquamish tribe in 2013. In 2014, the Port of Seattle transferred additional artifacts to the museum, including crockery and glass bottles, discovered during archaeological excavations in the 1970s at the Baba'kwob site, a pre-contact village located in what is now Seattle's Belltown neighborhood. The controversial transfer was contested by the Duwamish, an unrecognized tribe and historic Suquamish rival who claim ownership of the artifacts.

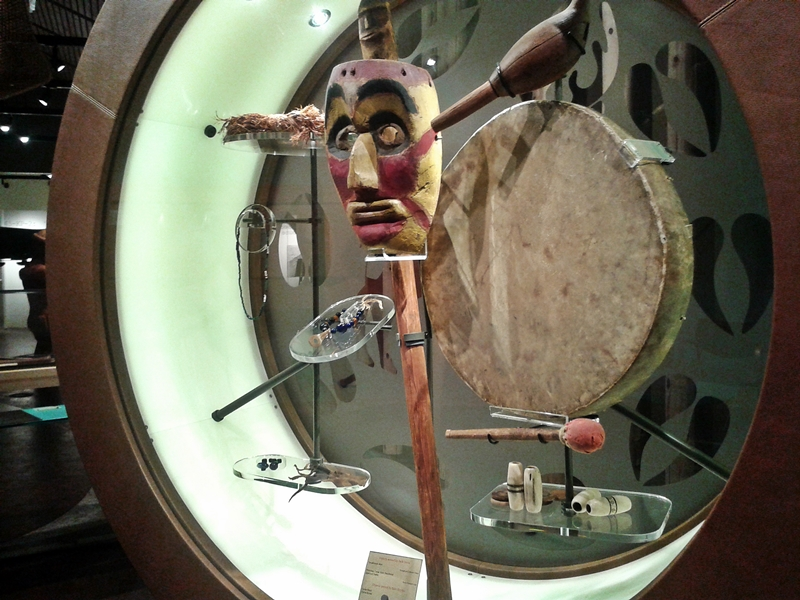
Suquamish ritual paraphernalia on display at the Suquamish Museum in 2014

=== Exhibitions ===
The museum's main gallery features a permanent exhibit titled "Ancient Shores – Changing Tides" that showcases drawings, documents, and historic photographs related to the Suquamish Tribe, contemporary and historic crafts, and interpretative panels and multimedia elements. The centerpiece of this exhibit is a 300-year-old carved canoe that was last used in the 1989 Paddle to Seattle, the first of a now annual series of Intertribal Canoe Journeys through the Salish Sea undertaken by tribal members. A second gallery is used to house rotating exhibits from the museum's permanent collection, or items on loan from other museums, including traveling exhibits from the Smithsonian Institution Traveling Exhibition Service (SITES). Exhibits have included a SITES display "Native Words, Native Warriors", chronicling the history of Native Americans in the U.S. armed forces.

=== Management ===
The Suquamish Museum is governed by a five-member board of directors appointed by the Suquamish Tribal Council. The galleries and auditorium of the museum are open daily during the summer, and five days per week the rest of the year. The museum's storage vault is open to tribal members and accredited researchers weekly.
