= Tilikum Place =

Plaza in Belltown, Seattle, Washington, U.S.

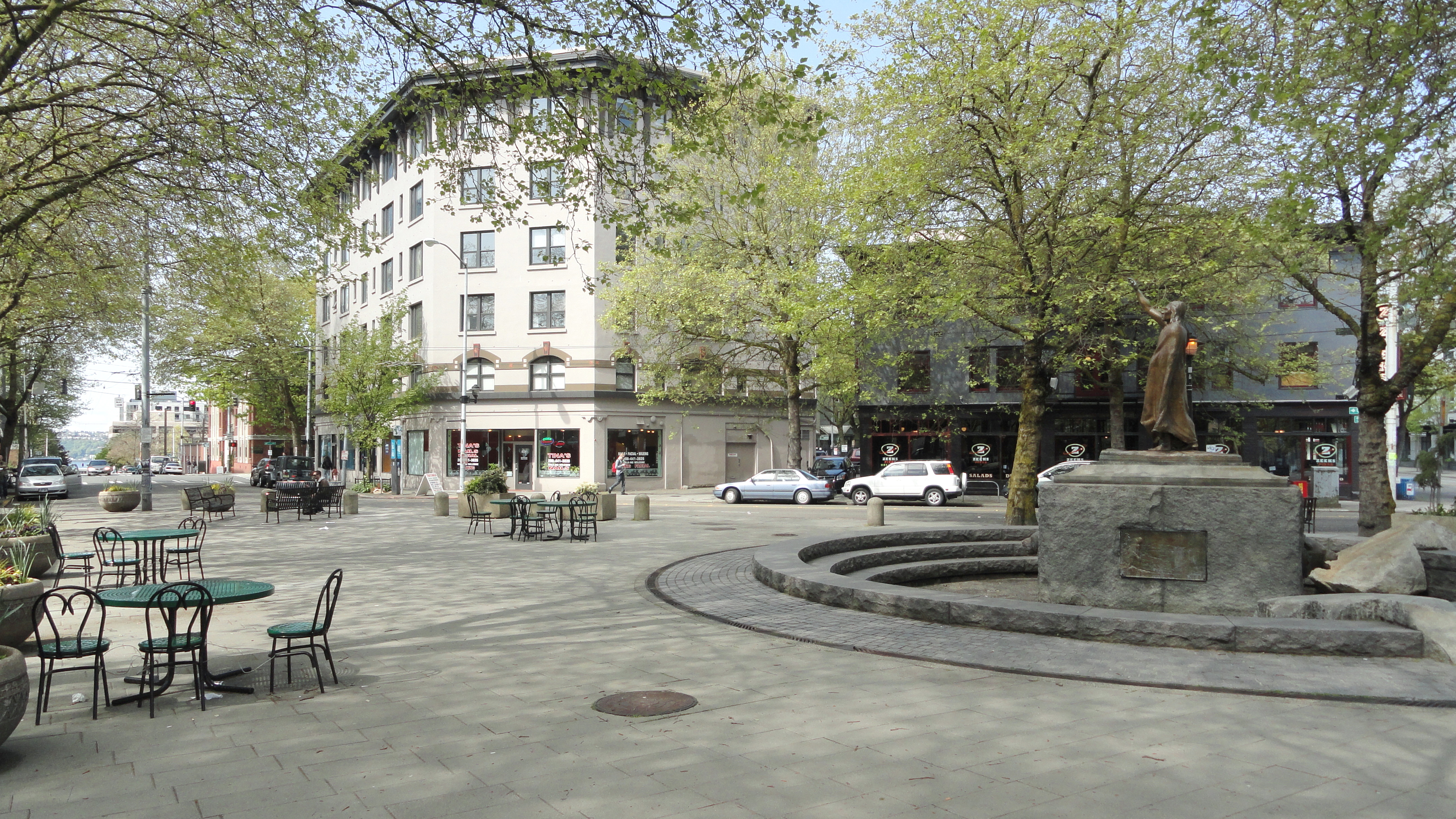
- Statue of Chief Seattle overlooking Tilikum Place. Cedar Street is in the background.
- Interactive map of Tilikum Place
- Location: Seattle, Washington
- Coordinates: 47°37′06″N 122°20′51″W
- Etymology: "People," "friend" (Chinook Jargon)
- Operator: Seattle Parks and Recreation
- Open: 6 a.m. – 10 p.m.
- Website: Tilikum Place

Tilikum Place is a small plaza in the Belltown neighborhood of downtown Seattle, Washington.

== Location and history ==
The site once marked the junction of the land claims of Arthur Denny, William Nathaniel Bell, and Carson Boren. The triangular plaza lies at the intersection of 5th Avenue, Cedar Street, and Denny Way. It was named for the Chinook Jargon word meaning "people" or "friend," but has often erroneously been cited as meaning "greetings" or "welcome," including by the city government itself.

Tilikum Place has several tables and benches for public use. Lighting was installed in 2008.

The 5 Point Cafe faces Tilikum Place. A notable feature of the square is the life-size statue of Chief Seattle by local sculptor James Wehn.
