= Human Resources Los Angeles =

- Established: 2010
- Location: 410 Cottage Home St. Los Angeles CA 90012
- Coordinates: 34°4′2.8258″N 118°14′16.9303″W
- Type: performance art
- Founders: Kathleen Kim, Eric Kim, Giles Miller, Devin McNulty, Dawn Kasper
- Website: h-r.la

Human Resources Los Angeles (HRLA) is a non-profit exhibition and performance space located in Los Angeles's Chinatown neighborhood. HRLA is dedicated to supporting interdisciplinary, performative, and experimental art practices. Located at 410 Cottage Home Street in Chinatown, the 4,000-square-foot space hosts events, exhibitions, and installations to showcase the arts in Los Angeles.

== History ==
Human Resources Los Angeles was founded by siblings Eric and Kathleen Kim in 2010. They were joined by three of their friends Giles Miller, Devin McNulty, and Dawn Kasper with the intent of featuring performance art over traditional static displays. Instead of being organized by a single curator, HRLA utilizes a content programming committee, organizing displays through collaboration. The name "human resources" refers to the fact that the gallery is a resource for artists rather than an institutional setting. Doug Harvey, writing for The New York Times mentioned HRLA among the "D.I.Y. artist-run project spaces evolving into an art-world destination" in Chinatown, the "surprise flashpoint of Los Angeles's rise as an international art center."

In 2011 HRLA moved from its original location, a small space at Bernard Street shared with other artists, to a much larger nearby renovated movie theater (previously occupied by "Cottage Home" gallery). At 4,000 square feet (370 m^{2}), the location has been described as "cavernous."

== Events ==
Even as a programmer at Human Resources, you never really know what you're going into at a show.

— Jennifer Doyle

Frieze described Human Resources Los Angeles as a "hot house for music and performance." It has hosted performances by a range of Los Angeles artists, including Ron Athey, Rafa Esparza, Dawn Kasper and My Barbarian. Artists from outside the region who have shared work through HRLA include Rocio Boliver, Ligia Lewis, Narcissister, Keijaun Thomas and Geo Wyeth. Notable group exhibitions include Katherine Garcia and Sarvia Jasso's "Queering Sex" (2011), and Kelman Duran's "The Border, Again" (2014).

Human Resources Los Angeles has also presented exhibitions of work by Carmen Argote, Fayçal Baghriche, Math Bass, Scott Benzel, Ohan Breiding, Sabrina Chou, Leidy Churchman, Helga Fassonaki, Fritz Haeg, EJ Hill, Candice Lin & Patrick Staff, Pearl C. Hsiung, Emily Joyce, Rasmus Rohling, Anna Sew Hoy, Sille Storihle, and Martine Syms. HRLA's music and sound program has featured Southland Ensemble, LA Fog, Dorian Wood, Jackie O'Motherfucker, Pedestrian Deposit, Pinkcourtesyphone, Postcommodity, Terre Thaemlitz, Lawrence English, and Touch artists. HRLA's programming extends to readings (e.g. Penny Arcade, Eileen Myles, Luis J Rodriguez, and Raquel Gutierrez). and screenings. In 2013 the gallery hosted a viewing of Andy Warhol's Sleep. In 2014 HRLA hosted Abraham Cruzvillegas's 2009 film Autoconstrucción and a Pokémon-themed exhibit called "Who is Ken Sugimori?" by Johnnie Jungleguts.

HRLA also collaborates with Los Angeles organizations such as VOLUME and ONE Archives. In 2012, HRLA hosted a fundraiser, headlined by indie bands No Age, Tearist, and L.A. Fog, opposing the introduction of Walmart to the neighborhood. That same year, LA Weekly recognized HRLA as one of the best arguments that Chinatown is "still a vital art neighborhood."
