= Art school =

Educational institution for visual arts

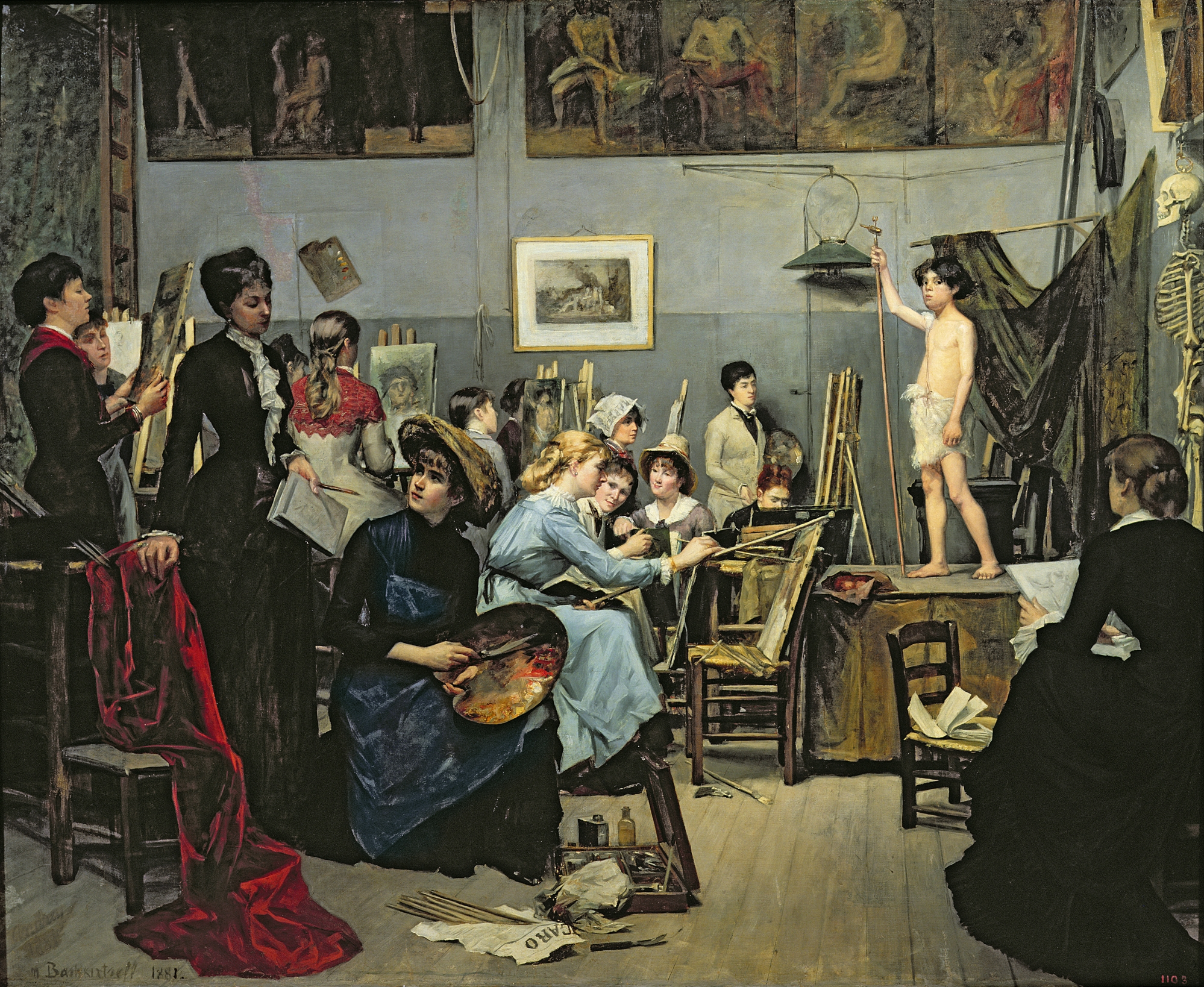
1881 painting by Marie Bashkirtseff, In the Studio, depicts an art school life drawing session, Dnipro State Art Museum, Dnipro, Ukraine

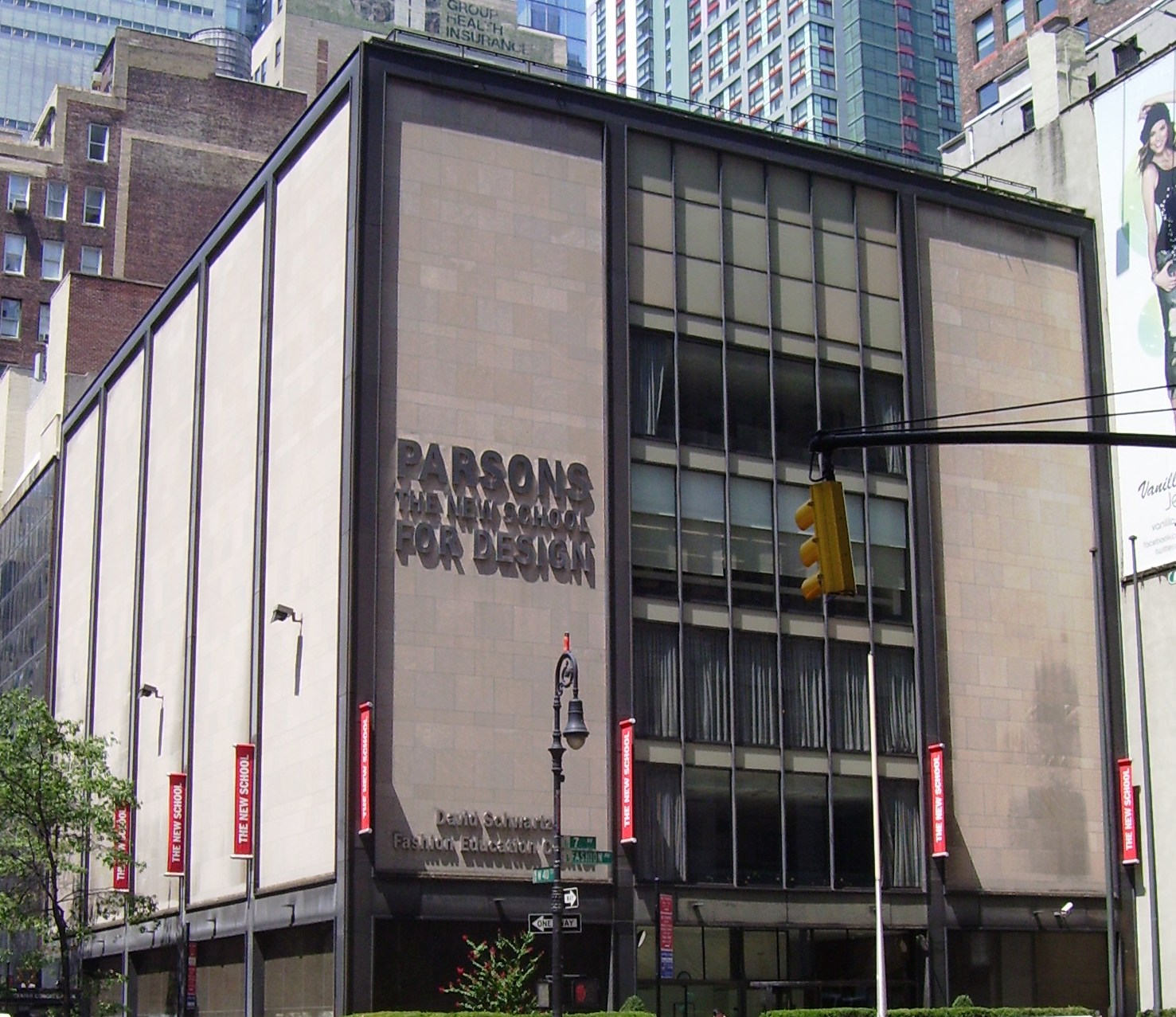
The Parsons School of Design in Manhattan

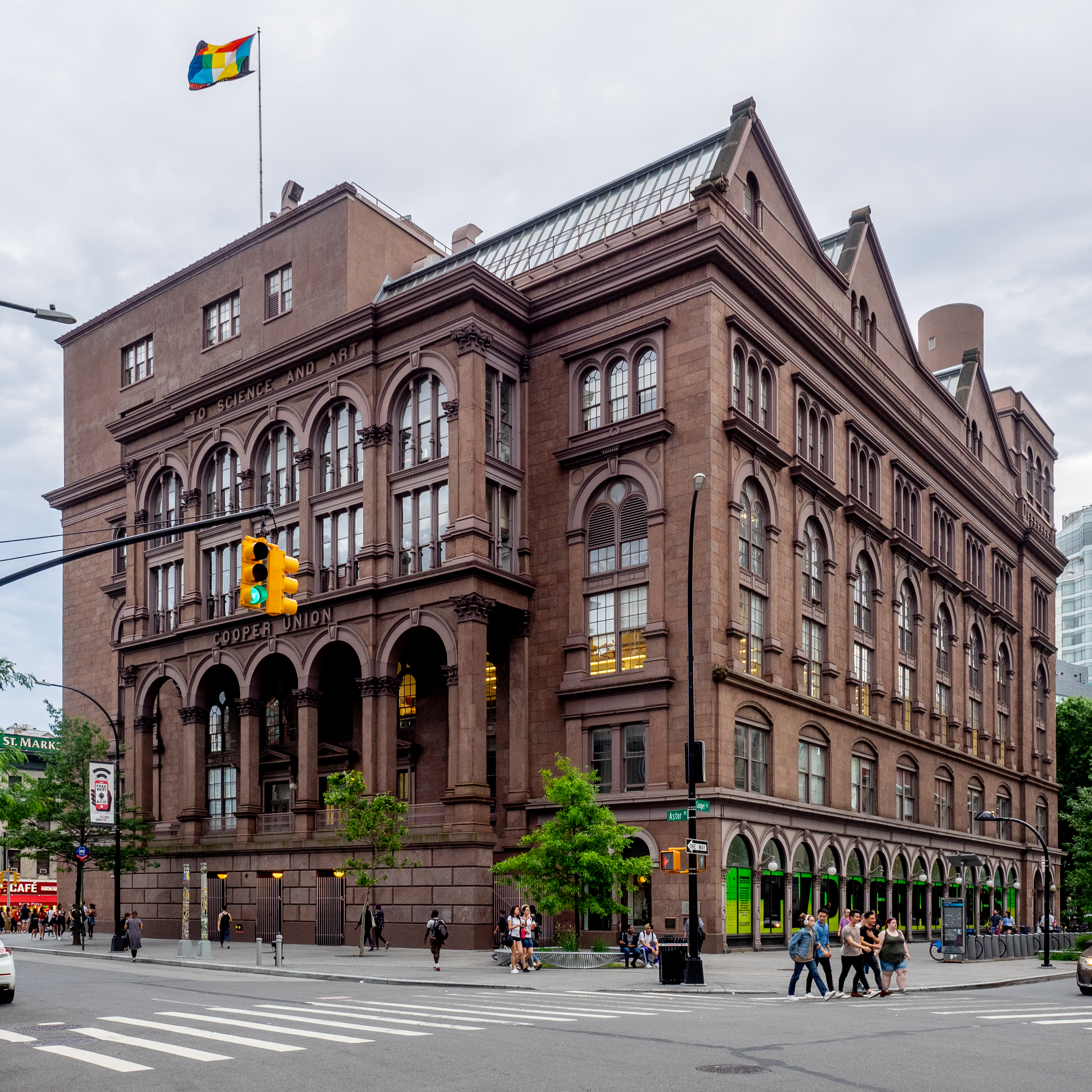
The Cooper Union Foundation Building, Cooper Square, Manhattan

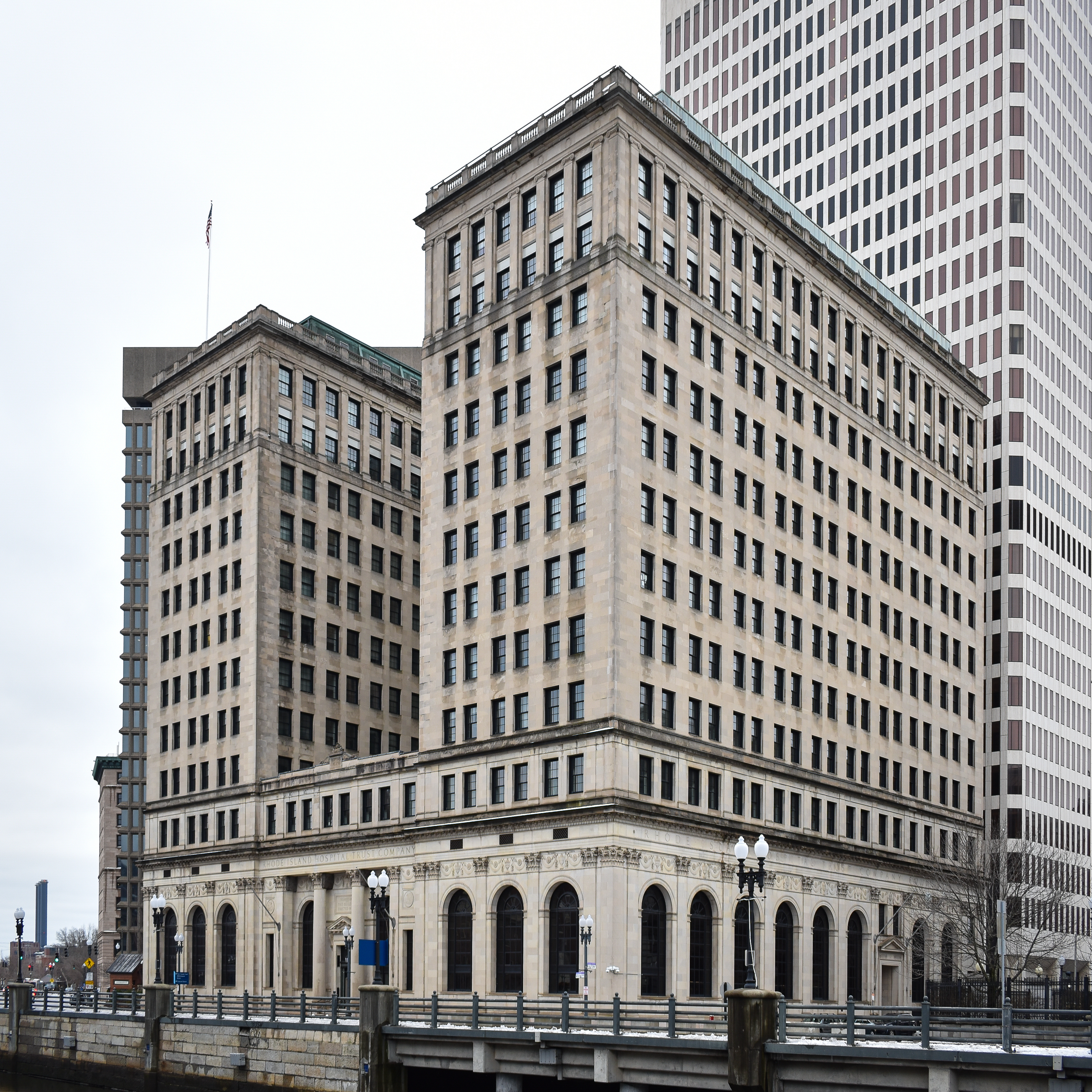
The Rhode Island School of Design in Providence, Rhode Island

An art school is an educational institution with a primary focus on practice and related theory in the visual arts and design. This includes fine art – especially illustration, painting, contemporary art, sculpture, and graphic design. They may be independent or operate within a larger institution, such as a university. Some may be associated with an art museum.

Art schools may be organized to offer elementary, secondary, post-secondary, undergraduate, or graduate programs, and can also offer a broad-based range of programs (such as the liberal arts and sciences). In the West there have been six major periods of art school curricula, and each one has had its own hand in developing modern institutions worldwide throughout all levels of education. Art schools also teach a variety of non-academic skills to many students.

== History ==
Nicholas Houghton identifies six definitive historical art-school curricula in the Western tradition of art and art education: "apprentice, academic, formalist, expressive, conceptual, and professional". Each of these curricula has aided not only the way that modern art-schools teach, but also how students learn about art.

Art schools have been perceived as legitimate universities since the 1980s. Before this, any art programs were used purely as extracurricular activities, and there were no methods of grading works. After the 1980s, art programs began to be integrated into schools and universities as legitimate courses that could be evaluated. While some argue that this weakened creativity among modern art-students, others see this as a way to treat fine arts as equal to other subjects.

=== Apprentice curriculum ===
Apprentice paths teach art as a mixture of aesthetic and function. In the past, students worked in the studio of an artist in exchange for room and board. Many of the Old Masters received training in this manner, copying or painting in the style of their teacher in order to learn the trade. Once the apprenticeship ended, the student would have to prove what they learned by creating a "masterpiece". Today this is sometimes done in photography or printmaking studios.

=== Academic curriculum ===
Academic curricula began during the sixteenth-century Italian Renaissance, in which some of the earliest art academies were established. Up through the nineteenth century, these academies multiplied through both Europe and North America, and art began to become about both talent and intellect.

=== Formalist curriculum ===
The formalist curriculum began in the mid-twentieth century, and focused on the basic components of artwork, such as "color, shape, texture, line - and a concern with the particular properties of a material or medium". This curriculum is most noted for including the height in popularity of Bauhaus. It was based on logic, mathematics, and 'Neoplatonism', which was widespread at the time.

=== Expressive curriculum ===
Although the expressive curriculum originated at the same time as the formalist one, it focuses on completely different aspects of art. Rather than being concerned with the literal components of a piece of art, expressive curricula encouraged students to express their emotions and practice spontaneity. This is due to the heightened popularity of romanticism throughout the Renaissance.

=== Conceptual curriculum ===
The conceptual curriculum began in the late-twentieth century, and focused not only on creating artwork, but also on presenting and describing the thought process behind the work. This is when the idea of critiquing others' works for educational purposes became popularized in North America (as the concept had been shut down quickly in Europe). This serves as a model for modern-day art school programs.

=== Professional curriculum ===
Professional curricula began appearing in art schools at the very end of the twentieth century. They teach students artistry from a perspective of business, and typically focus on modern pop-culture within the works themselves. These programs are designed to teach students how to promote both themselves and their artwork.

== Contemporary art schools ==
A wide variety of art mediums and styles are integrated into modern art school programs. Different mediums that are taught include painting, printmaking, drawing and illustration, theatre, and sculpture. Newer programs can include graphic design, filmmaking, graffiti art, and certain kinds of digital media.Some art schools include disciplines such as video game design, photography, fashion design, textile design, conceptual art, web design, architectural design and engineering, journalism and social media. Some schools continue craft traditions such as pottery, embroidery, printmaking, metalwork and building crafts.

Many cover theoretical subjects such as cultural anthropology, cultural theory and cultural history including histories of art traditions in local and global cultures, design theory, business and industry studies such as marketing communication, customer profiling and production related technical subjects.

In recent years a number of art schools have begun to offer some or all of their curricula online, which by nature, transcends national boundaries. Among these are The Art Institute of Pittsburgh Online and Academy of Art University. As with on-ground schools, many of the majors involve computer-based work, such as compositions created in Photoshop, Illustrator, or 3D-Studio Max. Submission and review of these materials proceeds virtually identically for on-ground and online classes. When online courses require production of traditional drawings or other such materials, they usually are photographed or scanned for submission and review by instructors.

According to the International Journal of Art and Design Education, "mainstream educational contexts could foster drawing behaviour and the related emotional benefits to a greater extent". A study by Bryan Goodwin that focused on the "Mozart effect", which refers to the idea that listening to classical music is beneficial for mental and intellectual development, discovered that art education is useful to students of any age. It was discovered that learning both music and art within one's education were helpful in processing symptoms for those with PTSD, anxiety, and depression.

== North America ==
=== United States ===
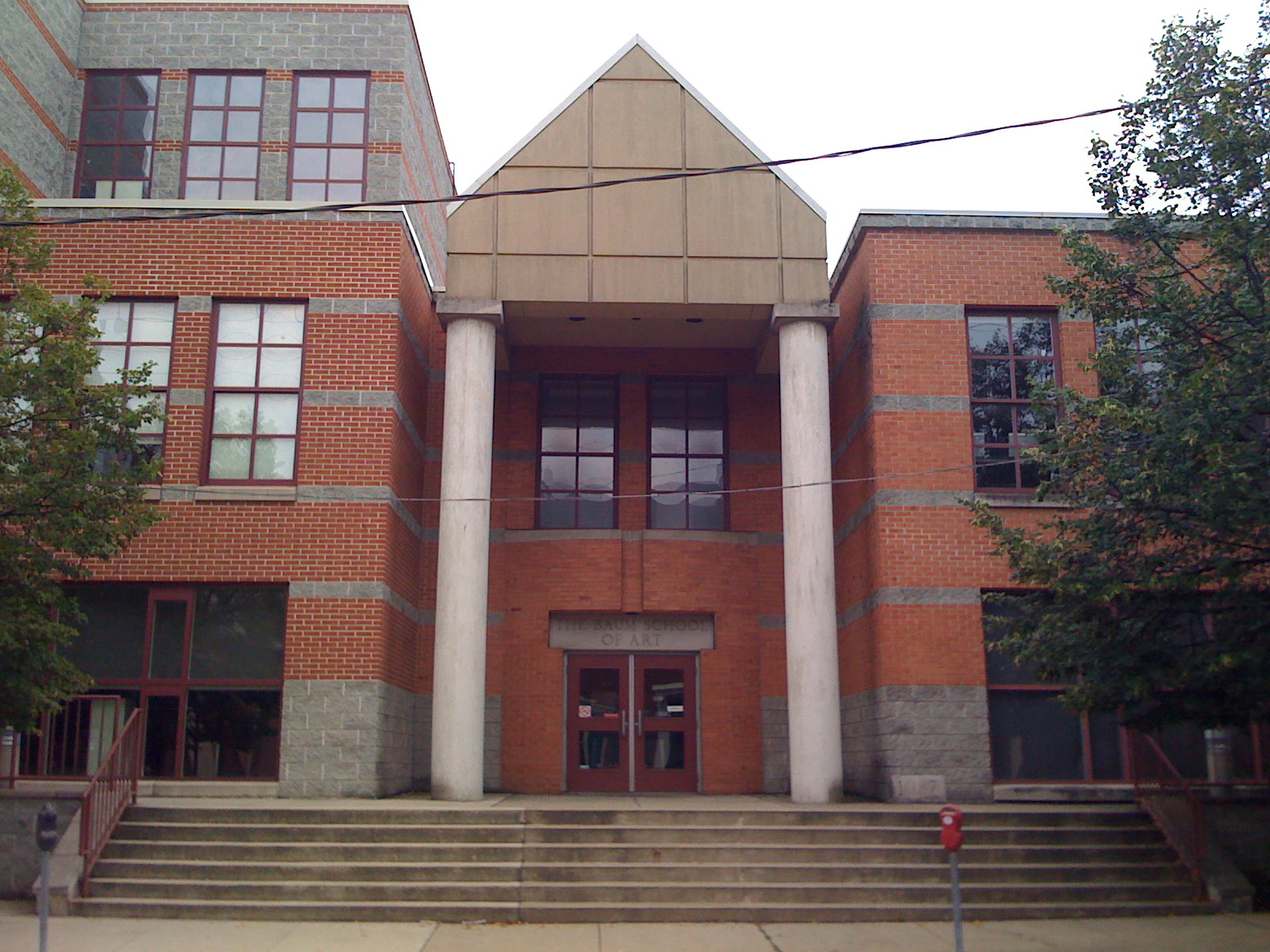
Baum School of Art in Allentown, Pennsylvania

In the U.S., art and design schools that offer Bachelor of Fine Arts or Master of Fine Arts degrees break down into basic types with some overlap and variations.

The most highly rated schools belong to a consortium formed in 1991 and called the Association of Independent Colleges of Art and Design (AICAD). These schools differ from for-profit career schools in that they require a strong component of liberal arts courses in addition to art and design courses, providing a well-rounded college degree.

There also are partnerships between art schools and universities such as School of the Art Institute of Chicago with Roosevelt University, the New England School of Art and Design at Suffolk University, Art Institute of Boston at Lesley University, the Rhode Island School of Design with Brown University, Maryland Institute College of Art and Johns Hopkins University, ArtCenter College of Design, the Corcoran College of Art and Design with The George Washington University, the School of the Museum of Fine Arts in conjunction with Tufts University, Tyler School of Art at Temple University, Parsons School of Design at The New School, or Herron School of Art at Indiana University.

There are at least two state-supported independent art schools in the U.S., Fashion Institute of Technology, which is part of the state university school system in New York, and Massachusetts College of Art and Design.

Cooper Union in New York City is among the most selective of art schools, admitting 4%, with every student on half scholarship. The Yale School of Art at Yale University offers only graduate classes in its two-year MFA programs. The Yale Daily News reported on Thursday, February 1, 2007, that the School had 1215 applications for its class of 2009 and would offer admission to fifty-five students.

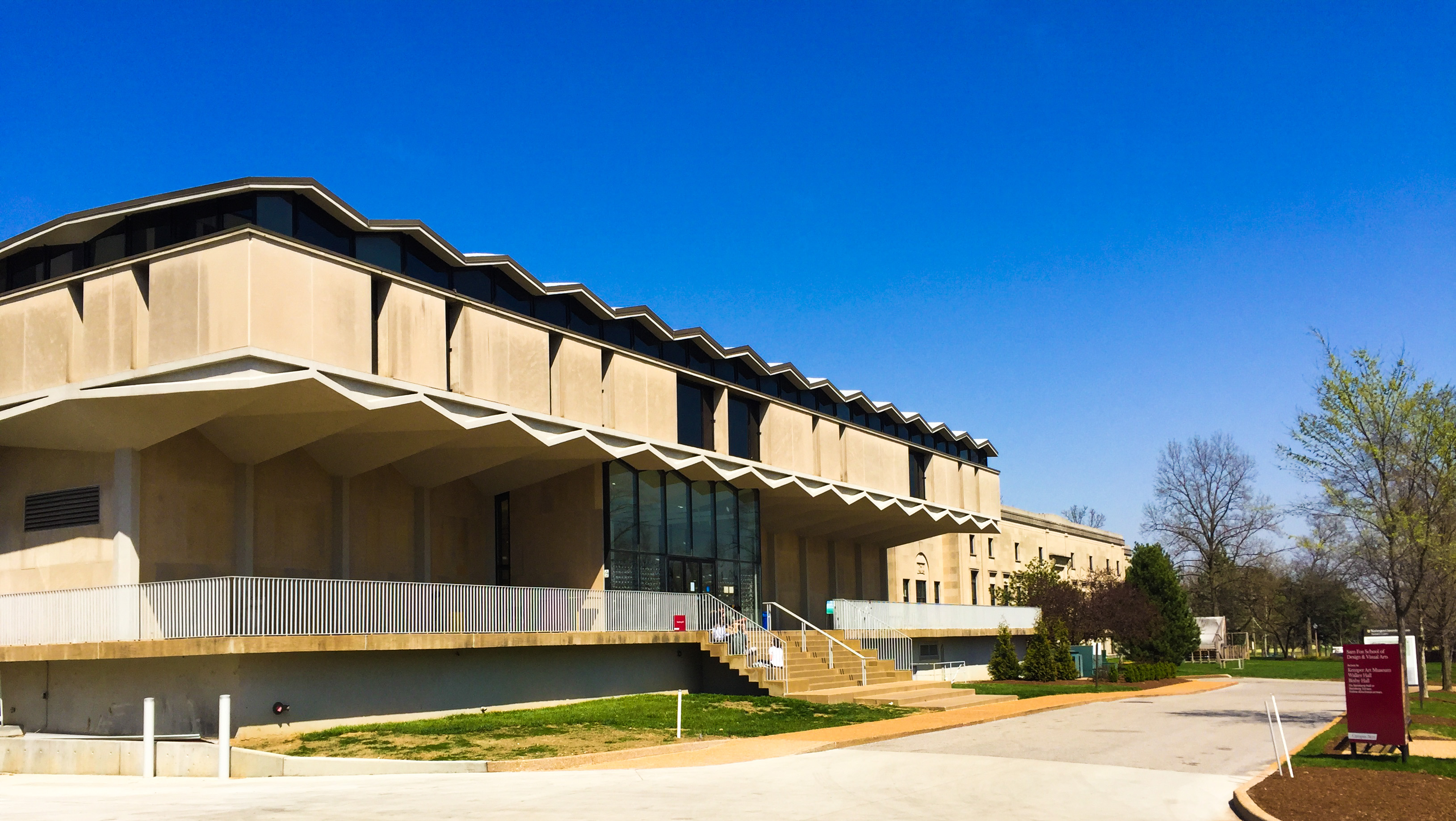
Steinberg Hall at the Sam Fox School of Design & Visual Arts, Washington University in St. Louis, St. Louis, MO

Next up the scale in size for an art school would be a large art or design department, school, or college at a university. If it is a college, such as the College of Design at Iowa State University typically, it would contain programs that teach studio art, graphic design, photography, architecture, landscape architecture, interior design, or interior architecture, as well as art, design, and architectural history areas. Sometimes these are simply the schools of art, architecture, and design such as those at the College of Fine and Applied Arts at the University of Illinois at Urbana-Champaign or the Yale School of Art. With over 3,000 students, VCU School of the Arts at Virginia Commonwealth University is one of the largest art schools in the nation and is also has achieved the highest ranking ever for a public university. Variation exists among art schools that are larger institutions, however, the essential element is that programs at universities tend to include more liberal arts courses and slightly less studio work, when compared to dedicated, but independent, schools of art.

The most common type of art school is affiliated with a university or college that offers a BA BFA, MA, or MFA. Many of the degree-offering institutions do not offer intense training in classical realism and academic painting and drawing. The Lyme Academy College of Fine Arts is considered a collegiate version of this educational model. This gap is filled by Atelier art schools (schools located inside an artist's studio) or in separate locations, such as the New York Academy of Art, the National Academy of Design, the New York Studio School, the Pennsylvania Academy of the Fine Arts (PAFA), established 1805, the Art Students League of New York, established in 1875.

=== Canada ===
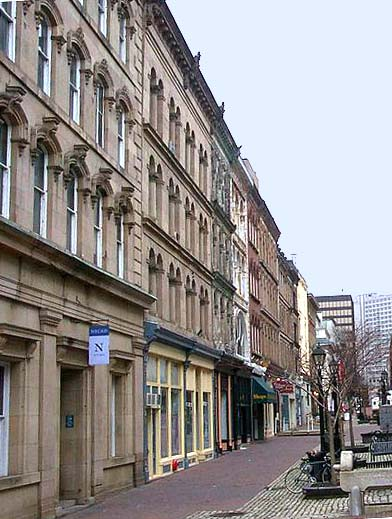
NSCAD University in Halifax was Canada's first degree-granting art school.

There are four independent art and design universities in Canada, all public institutions. They are Emily Carr University of Art and Design (Vancouver), NSCAD University (Halifax), OCAD University (Toronto), and Alberta College of Art and Design (Calgary).

Emily Carr University has one of the most active research programs among the four with over $15 million in research over the last five years. OCAD University's research intensity has reached $3.2 million in 2011–12. All four schools teach in the major disciplines from painting through to new media and design. Over the last five years, Emily Carr has garnered most of the major awards for students and alums across the country.

NSCAD University was founded in 1887 by Anna Leonowens and other Halifax women. The school gained international prominence in the 1970s for innovation in conceptual art under the leadership of Garry Kennedy. In spite of its modest size, Art in America suggested in 1973 that NSCAD was "the best art school in North America", while more recently The Globe and Mail called it Canada's "most illustrious".

The teaching of visual art at Mount Allison University can be traced back to the opening of the Women's Academy in 1854. It has been an important part of the curriculum since that time. In 1941, Mount Allison was the first university in Canada to give a Bachelor of Fine Arts degree in the visual arts. Much of the department's history was, and is, directly related to the Owens Art Gallery. Established in 1895, The Owens is Canada’s oldest university fine arts museum and the custodian of an important collection that span the nineteenth, twentieth, and twenty-first centuries. Until 1965, when the department moved to its own quarters in the Gairdner Fine Arts Building, the department was housed in the gallery. Since that time the gallery has been extensively remodelled into one of the largest in the Maritimes, serving both the university and community. In 2014, the department moved to a new contemporary state of the art studio facility in the Purdy Crawford Centre for the Arts. And in 2020, the Pierre Lassonde School of Fine Arts was established through philanthropic support, and builds on the program's long-standing history in and support of the arts.

==== Secondary schools (Ontario area) ====
Claude Watson School for the Arts and Karen Kain School of the Arts are intermediate-age public art schools in Toronto, Ontario. They are continued by the Claude Watson program at Earl Haig Secondary School and by the Etobicoke School of the Arts, Rosedale Heights School of the Arts, Wexford Collegiate School for the Arts, and the Catholic board Cardinal Carter Academy for the Arts.

In Brampton, Mayfield Secondary School's Regional Arts Program offers a public high school-level art school. Mississauga's Cawthra Park Secondary School offers the Regional Arts Program within a public high school-level art school as well. St. Roch Catholic Secondary School and St. Thomas Aquinas Secondary School have regional arts programs at the Catholic high school level.

Canterbury High School, in Ottawa's Urbandale neighbourhood, is an arts magnet school.

F.A.C.E, an elementary and highschool that operates in both the English and French school boards in Montreal, is an arts magnet school.

== Europe ==
=== Belgium ===
Art schools include the Royal Academy of Fine Arts, Ecole Supérieure des Arts du Cirque, and La Cambre.

=== France ===
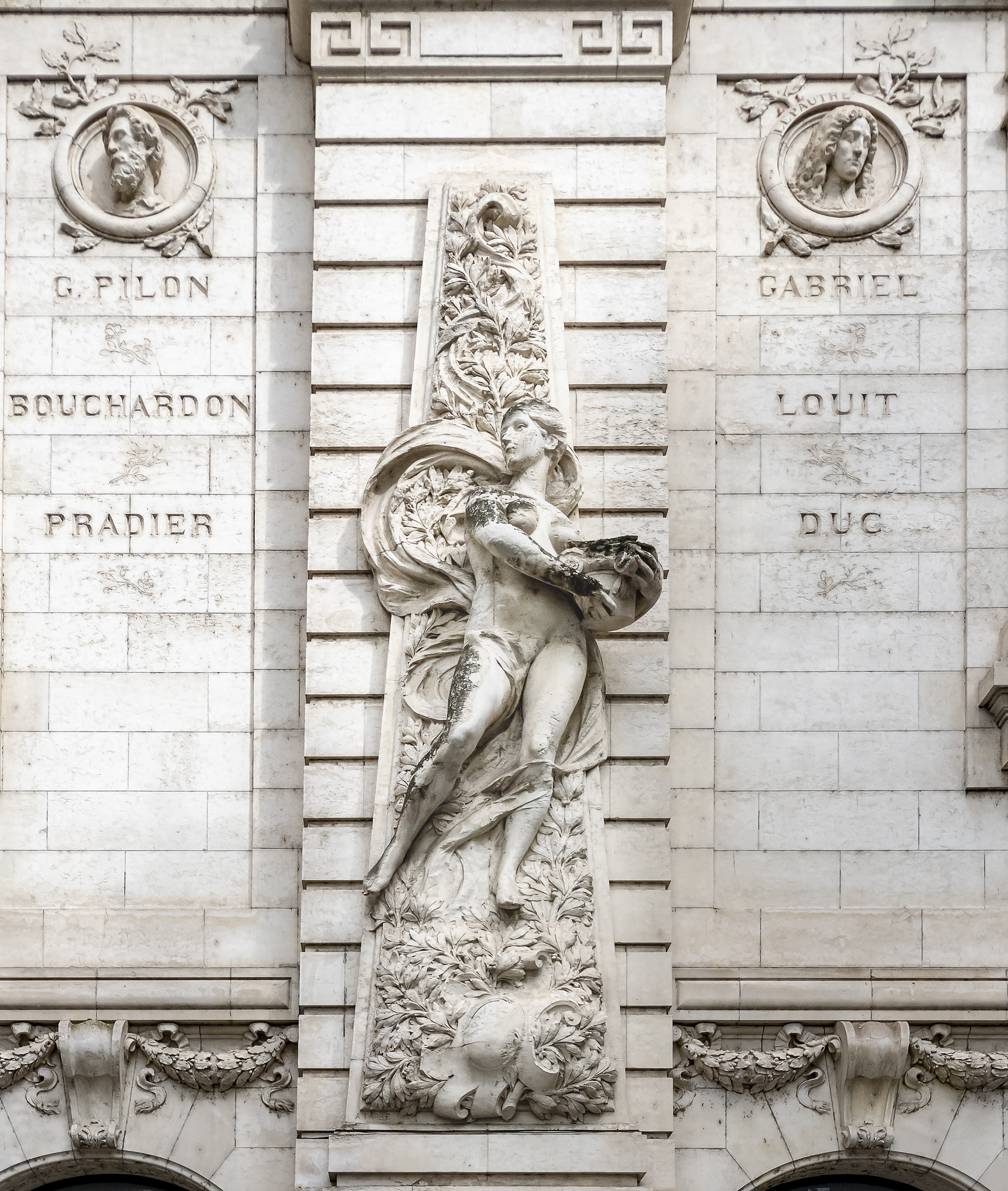
Sculpture outside the École des Beaux-Arts in Paris

The oldest art academy in France is Paris Fine Art School, established in 1648 by Charles Le Brun, and most present public art schools are over two centuries old: Nancy (1708), Toulouse (1726), Rouen (1741), etc. Some of those schools were called academies and were prestigious institutions, devoted to the education of great painters or sculptors. Others were called "école gratuite de dessin" (free school for drawing) and were devoted to the education of arts and craft artists.

Currently, there are 45 national or territorial public schools of art in France, which deliver bachelor (DNA) and master (DNSEP or DNSAP) degrees. They do not belong to universities.

=== Germany ===
The Academy of Fine Arts Nuremberg (German: Akademie der Bildenden Künste Nürnberg) was founded in 1662 by Jacob von Sandrart and is the oldest art academy in German-speaking Central Europe. Fine and applied arts have since formed key sectors of learning, although the emphasis has shifted in one direction or the other over the centuries. Today, learning takes the form of interdisciplinary interaction, and dialogue between fine and applied disciplines. It is flanked by new degree courses and a new media technology study program.

=== Greece ===
Art education in Greece is provided by institutions such as the Athens School of Fine Arts, established in 1837, Thessaloniki School of Fine Arts, Florina School of Fine Arts and Ioannina School of Fine Arts. These schools offer programs in various visual arts disciplines, contributing significantly to the cultural and artistic heritage of the country.

=== Italy ===
In Italy, there are twenty Academies of Fine Arts sustained by the state and eighteen private and public academies legally recognized. The Florence Academy of Fine Arts in Florence is the oldest Academy of Fine Arts in the world. All these academies, together with all the music conservatories, institutes of musical studies, and other educational institutes, converge in a specific compartment of the Italian Ministry of University and Research named AFAM (Alta Formazione Artistica, Musicale e Coreutica).

=== The Netherlands ===
Royal Academy of Art, The Hague was founded in 1682 and is the largest and oldest art institution in the Netherlands. Design Academy Eindhoven was founded in 1955. Gerrit Rietveld Academie was founded in 1924 in Amsterdam with a main focus on De Stijl and Bauhaus at that time.

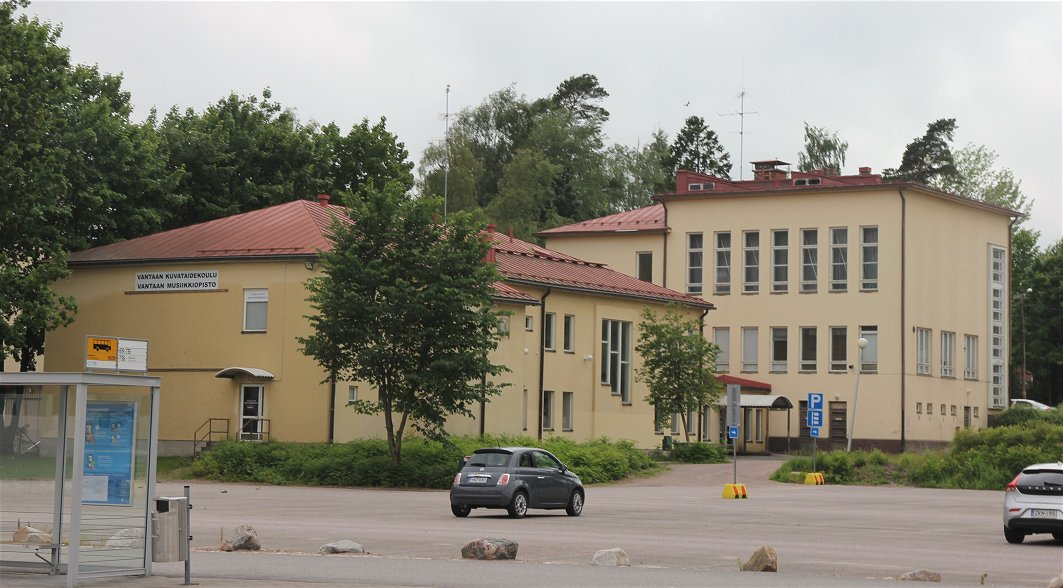
Vantaa School of Art in Tikkurila, Vantaa, Finland

=== Sweden ===
Art schools have existed in Sweden since the first half of the 18th century. Students may attend the Royal Institute of Art, founded in 1735. Established in 1844 originally as a part-time art school for Sunday artisans, the University College of Arts, Crafts and Design known as "Konstfack" is an arts college offering bachelor's and master's degrees in ceramics, glass, textiles, metalworking, and more.

There are also tertiary art schools attached to universities in Gothenburg, Malmö, and Umeå.

=== United Kingdom ===
Art education in the United Kingdom includes institutions like the Royal College of Art, which was established in 1837, and other prestigious schools such as the Slade School of Fine Art and the Glasgow School of Art. These institutions offer comprehensive programs in various art disciplines.

Perhaps those most applicable to the definition of 'art school' are the autonomous colleges or schools of art offering courses across both further and higher education boundaries, of which there are approximately eighteen, under the banner of United Kingdom Art & Design Institutions Association. Others, whose existence ties in indelibly with that of larger, non-discipline-specific universities (such as the Slade School of Art) exist. Most art schools of either orientation are equipped to offer opportunities spanning from post-16 to postgraduate level.

The range of colleges span from further education establishments to research-led specialist institutes. The University of the Arts London, for example, is a federally structured institution that comprises six previously independent colleges situated in London. These include Camberwell College of Arts, Central Saint Martins, Chelsea College of Arts, London College of Communication, London College of Fashion, and Wimbledon College of Arts; others include The Slade School of Fine Art, Ravensbourne University London, The Royal College of Art and Goldsmiths College, University of London, which each grant undergraduate and postgraduate awards under one collegiate arm. The Royal College of Art with its degree-awarding arm and singular focus on postgraduate awards being a most singular exception.

Outside of London art schools in the UK include Arts University Bournemouth, Coventry School of Art and Design, University for the Creative Arts, Duncan of Jordanstone College of Art & Design, Edinburgh College of Art (part of University of Edinburgh), Glasgow School of Art, Gray's School of Art, Hereford College of Arts, Leeds College of Art, Liverpool School of Art (part of Liverpool John Moores University), Loughborough University School of Art and Design, Manchester School of Art (part of Manchester Metropolitan University), Norwich University of the Arts, Moray School of Art (University of the Highlands and Islands), The Northern School of Art and Plymouth College of Art and Design.

Since the 1970s, degrees have replaced diplomas as the top-tier qualification in the field.

In the case of wholly freestanding institutions, degree validation agreements in liaison with a university have long been the custom for Bachelor of Arts (Hons) level upward. There has been a general trend for all-encompassing universities to offer programs in the visual arts, and formerly independent art schools have merged with polytechnics and universities to offer such degrees. A notable exception to this is the City and Guilds of London Art School, an independent art school solely focused on fine art and related disciplines such as carving and conservation. A few art schools have taken on university status themselves, namely Arts University Bournemouth, University for the Creative Arts, University of the Arts London, and Norwich University of the Arts. While Courtauld Institute of Art, Leeds College of Art and Royal College of Art are recognised institutions - some with degree awarding powers.

Most specialist institutions in the United Kingdom can trace their histories back to the nineteenth century or beyond, originating usually from government initiatives.

== Asia ==
=== Indonesia ===
The first art school in Indonesia was the Universitaire Leergang voor Tekenleraren en Handenarbeit located in Bandung, part of Technical Faculty of Universiteit van Indonesie (Indonesian: Fakultas Teknik Universitas Indonesia). The school was initiated by Simon Admiraal (Art Teacher from Jakarta Lyceum), and Ries Mulder (Hollands Artist) in the year 1947. Now, the school is integrated to Institut Teknologi Bandung as Faculty of Art and Design, in the same location as previous school. Following the establishment of Universitaire Leergang, in 1950 ASRI (Indonesian Visual Art Academy) was opened in Jogjakarta, now ISI Jogjakarta. Currently there is a prominent Art School in every major Islands in Indonesia, following the establishment of ISI (Indonesian Art Institute) and ISBI (Indonesian Art and Culture Institute) in every major Islands/cities, like ISI Surakarta, ISI Denpasar, ISBI Aceh, ISBI Papua, ISBI Kalimantan, and ISBI Bandung. There are also prominent private art school/program in Indonesia namely Institut Kesenian Jakarta (Jakarta Arts Institute), visual arts program at Telkom University in Bandung, and also at Maranatha University.

== Oceania ==
=== Australia ===
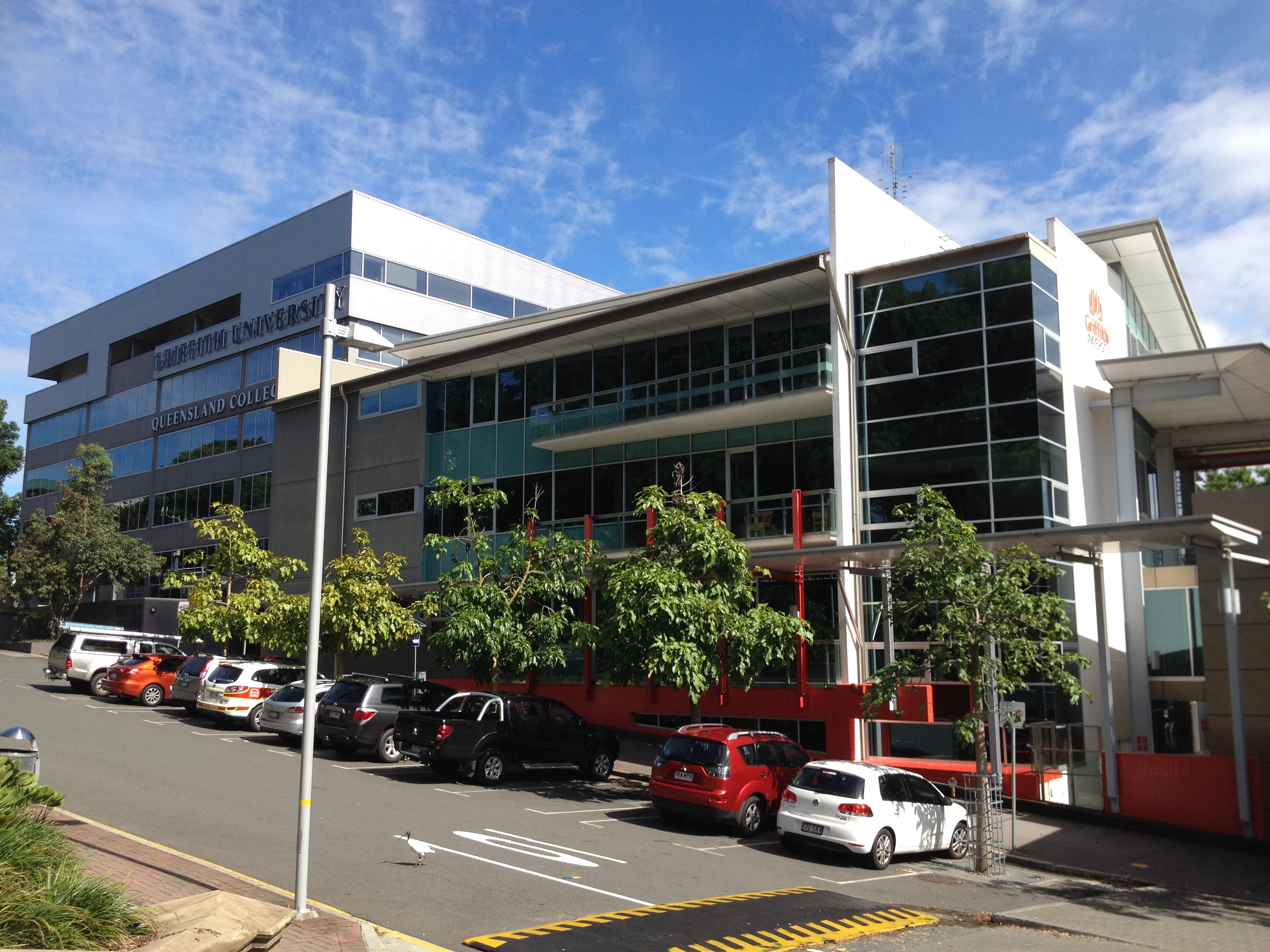
Queensland College of Art in Australia

Art schools in Australia are mostly located within Australian universities as a result of the Dawkins higher education reforms of the late 1980s. Prior to the Dawkins reforms, there was a mix of university-based art schools and single-discipline colleges of art. Art schools are now represented by the peak body, the Australian Council of University Art and Design Schools (ACUADS), which was founded in 1981 and was originally called the National Council of Heads of Art and Design Schools. ACUADS has 30 members:

There are other art schools in Australia, such as the Julian Ashton Art School, but they are either not accredited by TEQSA to award degrees or are private, for-profit institutions that sit outside the university system.

== See also ==
- Academic art
- Academy figure
- Kunstgewerbeschule
- List of art schools
- List of artist-initiated schools
- Visual arts education
- Vocational school
- Vocational university
