= Fritz Haeg =

American architect and artist

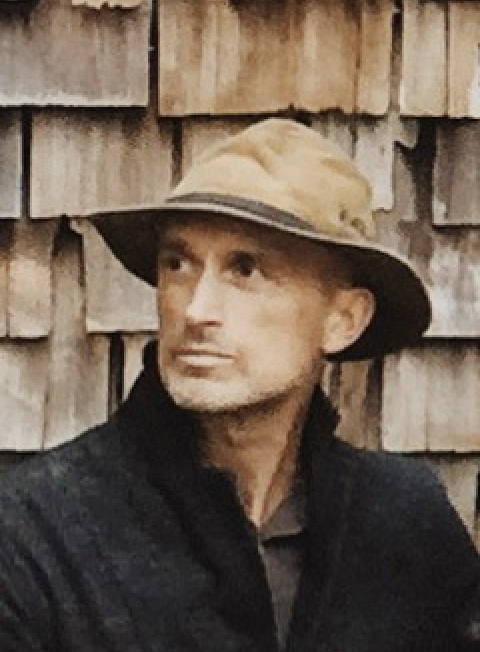
- Born: 1969 (age 56–57); Saint Cloud, Minnesota, US
- Known for: Art, Architecture, Design, Gardens, Ecology, Dance, Performance
- Notable work: Sundown Salon (2001–2006), Sundown Schoolhouse (2006–present), Edible Estates (2005–2013), Animal Estates (2008 – present)

Fritz Haeg (born 1969) is an American artist whose work spans a range of disciplines and media including gardens, dance, performance, design, installation, ecology and architecture, most of which is commissioned and presented by art museums and institutions. His work often involves collaboration with other individuals and cites specific projects that respond to particular places.

== Life and work ==
Haeg's architecture projects have included the design for various residential and art projects including the contemporary art gallery peres projects and the Bernardi residence, both in Los Angeles, CA. He studied architecture in Italy at the Istituto Universitario di Architettura di Venezia and Carnegie Mellon University, where he received his B.Arch. He has variously taught in architecture, design, and fine art programs at California Institute of the Arts (CalArts), Art Center College of Design, Parsons School of Design, Princeton University, and the University of Southern California.

Haeg was based in a geodesic dome in Los Angeles, California from 2000 to 2014 before moving to the Salmon Creek Farm, a 35-acre former hippie commune on the coast of Mendocino County, California.

=== Gardenlab (2000) ===
In 2000 he established Gardenlab, a loose umbrella for his ecology related art and design projects. This initially included community gardens for Art Center College of Design and later California Institute of the Arts (CalArts) where he was an instructor.

=== Sundown Salon (2001–2006) ===
In 2000 Haeg moved into a geodesic dome in the hills of Los Angeles, California, where in 2001 he established Sundown Salon, a regular series of events, performances and happenings that attracted a diverse crowd, and galvanized a community of east side Los Angeles artists, designers, musicians, and performers. Those who presented work included artists Anna Sew Hoy, Yoshua Okon, Dean Sameshima, Alice Konitz, Pae White, Eve Fowler, Liz Larner, Christopher Peters, Pipilotti Rist, Katie Grinnan, and Jeff Burton; writers Slava Mogutin, Chris Abani, Trinie Dalton and Eileen Myles; and collectives My Barbarian, Los Super Elegantes, Assume Vivid Astro Focus, Lesbians to the Rescue (LTTR), Robbinschilds, and Janfamily. In 2006 the Sundown Salon events came to an end, to be replaced by Sundown Schoolhouse. First based in the geodesic dome as a seasonal self-organized educational environment spanning disciplines, it is now itinerant with programming connected to Haeg's various initiatives.

=== Edible Estates (2005–2013) ===
In 2005 he began planting a series of gardens called Edible Estates, a revival of the Victory garden movement. Starting in Salina, Kansas, he selected a local family of willing gardeners to have their lawn removed and replaced with a kitchen garden, of his design. The first garden was commissioned by the Salina Art Center, with later editions in Lakewood, California (2006), Maplewood, New Jersey (2007), London, England, (commissioned by Tate Modern in 2007), Austin, Texas, (commissioned by Arthouse in 2008), Baltimore, Maryland, (commissioned by Contemporary Museum Baltimore in 2008), and a public demonstration garden at Descanso Gardens in La Cañada Flintridge, California. The fifteenth and final Edible Estate was commissioned by the Walker Art Center and created in the front lawn of Woodbury, Minnesota residents Catherine and John Schoenherr. The book, "Edible Estates: Attack on the Front Lawn", was published by Metropolis Books in spring 2008. It is a call for the replacement of the front lawn with edible landscapes, featuring examples of his previous Edible Estate gardens accompanied by essays from Diana Balmori, Michael Pollan and Rosalind Creasy.

Edible Estates was created to directly combat the American social norm of having a front lawn that is just a barren patch of grass. For this project, Americans throughout the country are asked to change their front lawns into thriving gardens where they grow a variety of fruits and vegetables. Michael Foti, one of the Americans who participated, says, “Public cultivation of fruits and vegetables fosters a sense of community: kids coming by to pick strawberries and neighbors volunteering to help out.”9 The front lawn was first introduced for vanity and pride in order to demonstrate the prosperity of a home. However, as we start to realize more and more, the front lawn that all Americans are familiar with is becoming outdated. Instead of having this useless patch of grass in front of your home, why not turn it into a place of cultivation? As Lynne Rossetto Kasper puts it, “The masterful part is thinking how to turn this flat, green space that is the most visible part of your home into something that invites us in, nourishes us and perhaps starts changing our community.” Haeg has also used Edible Estates as an opportunity to bring attention to the past. Specifically, in the Edible Estates garden #8 in Manhattan, Haeg pays tribute to the Lenape people who previously occupied the island of Manahatta (Manhattan). In the garden, beans, corn, and squash (also known as “the three sisters”) are grown because the Lenape people had eaten them centuries before, in the exact same spot. As Haeg states, “This garden is a meditation on the historical facts of and future possibilities for our occupation of the island.”

Families who have volunteered their lawns for an Edible Estate have seen numerous benefits from personal to environmental. Michael Foti, from Los Angeles, California, journaled that volunteers came to help plant the garden. His garden has been visited by neighbors, surrounding community members, and even folks who read about the project in the newspaper. Foti wrote "some of these people just give a wave and a thumbs up from their car window as they drive by. Others will stop and tell stories about their own gardens, or offer advice and encouragement". Environmental benefits of Edible Estates include clean, homegrown food, zero packaging, and each contributes to the well-being of the local ecology. Sourcing produce from the front yard also cuts out the need for delivery from farm, to packaging center, to distribution center, to store, to home which reduces toxic emissions from vehicles.

=== Sundown Schoolhouse (2006–2014) ===
Sundown Schoolhouse is a series of classes hosted in Haeg's home in Los Angeles. The program started in 2006, just as his related event series Sundown Salons concluded. The school was "founded on the premise that artists, designers, performers and writers should be powerful and active agents in society, engaging in a rich and complex dialog that extends to the outside world. The Schoolhouse seeks to present an alternate model for educational and artistic practice, one in which public interaction, physical connectedness, and responsiveness to place are valued above all else." In 2009, a book was published about the activities at then Salon and Schoolhouse.

The Sundown Schoolhouse group presented classes such as Dancing 9–5, Library for the Future, and 'Practicing Moving.' Other activities considered part of the program have included casual meals and yoga sessions. The Schoolhouse responds to the general interests within its community, and often relates to Haeg's other exhibits and projects. Under the name of Sundown Schoolhouse, Haeg has worked with institutions such as Whitney Museum of American Art, Institute of Contemporary Art, Philadelphia, San Francisco Museum of Modern Art.

Visiting hosts and lecturers are invited to organize courses, seminars, and events. Participants and collaborators included Emily Roysdon, Andrea Zittel, Damon Rich, founder of the Center for Urban Pedagogy and Eileen Myles.

=== Animal Estates (2008) ===
Animal Estates proposes the strategic reintroduction of native animals into cities. Each edition of the project is commissioned and presented by a local museum which includes various combinations of related performances, displays, installations, exhibitions, documentary videos, and printed materials such as a local field guide. The project debuted at the 2008 Whitney Biennial featuring a designed beaver pond in the sunken courtyard, an eagle's nest perched above the museum entry. Later 2008 editions are in Cambridge, Massachusetts (Center for Advanced Visual Studies at MIT), San Francisco, California (San Francisco Museum of Modern Art), Portland, Oregon (Douglas F. Cooley Memorial Art Gallery, Reed College), and Utrecht, Netherlands (Casco Office for Art, Design and Theory).

Fritz Haeg's Animal Estates were inspired by his Edible Estates and an interest in animals that he has had all along. He has created a total of nine of these estates. Haeg looked at every city individually, he spent much time researching and working with local experts to produce homes for these animals that worked well within that specific city, which is similar to the Edible Estates. He hoped that these exhibitions would inspire people to create habitats for animals on their own properties because the viewers would see how simple and easy these structures would be to make.

Like Edible Estates, this particular edition of Animal Estates was a tribute to the history of the land. He built homes for the animals that resided along the Lenape people four hundred years ago. These animals included the bald eagle, barn owl, wood duck, purple martin, big brown bat, mason bee, opossum, northern flying squirrel, bobcat, eastern tiger salamander, eastern mud turtle, and the beaver. Besides providing a home for these animals, Animal Estates was also meant to inspire. Haeg states, “I want to make them as simple and primitive and handmade as possible so that anyone can look at them and imagine building one on their own property.”
