= Oscar Tuazon =

American artist based in Los Angeles (born 1975)

- Born: Oscar Hansen; 1975 (age 50–51); Indianola, Washington, U.S.
- Education: Deep Springs College; Cooper Union (BFA)
- Known for: Installation art, sculpture, mixed media art
- Spouse(s): Lan Tuazon (div.); Dorothée Perret
- Children: 3
- Relatives: Elias Hansen (brother)

Oscar Tuazon (né Oscar Hansen; born 1975) is an American visual artist, who works in sculpture, installation art, architectural art, and mixed media art. He lives in Los Angeles, California.

== Early life and education ==
Oscar Tuazon was born as Oscar Hansen on July 9, 1975, in Indianola in Kitsap County, Washington. His brother is Elias Hansen, he is an artist and a frequent art collaborator. They grew up on the Port Madison Reservation, land governed by the Suquamish Indian Tribe. Their parents were Anna Linzey, and John Hansen, and both were book binders.

He attended Deep Springs College in Deep Springs, California, and the Cooper Union in New York City. Additionally he attended the Whitney Independent Study Program in New York City.

== Career ==
In 2001, Tuazon served as a founding board member at the Center for Urban Pedagogy in New York with his former Deep Springs classmate Damon Rich.

Tuazon began his career in 2003 working in the Studio Acconci, of architect and artist Vito Acconci. He exhibited his work "City Without a Ghetto," at the group exhibition, Float (2003) held at Socrates Sculpture Park, in Queens, New York City.

After moving to Paris in 2007, he began exhibiting widely in Europe. He has since then exhibited at the 2011 Venice Biennale, the 2012 Whitney Biennial, and many group and solo shows throughout the world.

Tuazon was awarded in 2007 the Betty Bowen Award, by the Seattle Art Museum.

A critic in the art magazine Frieze wrote in 2013 that "like his heroes, from Gordon Matta-Clark to wilderness survivalists, Tuazon's non-conformist approach to artistic practice plays at the juncture of architecture, sculpture and performance." A New York Times review described his work as "haunting ... pit[ting] Mr. Acconci's robust ego against Mr. Tuazon's raw and fragile subjectivity."

== Personal life and name change ==
Oscar met and married artist Lan Tuazon in New York City in the mid-90s, and changed his name from Oscar Hansen to Oscar Tuazon. The couple would later be divorced, but he kept the last name.

In January 2013, Tuazon moved from Paris, France to the Silver Lake neighborhood of Los Angeles with his three children and his second wife Dorothée Perret, a former editor at Purple magazine.

== Exhibitions ==
- 2008, Kodiak (with Elias Hansen), Seattle Art Museum, Seattle
- 2008, This World's Just Not Real To Me (with Elias Hansen), Howard House, Seattle
- 2010, Sex Booze Weed Speed, (with Gardar Eide Einarsson), Rat Hole Gallery, Tokyo
- 2010, My Mistake, Institute of Contemporary Arts, London
- 2011, 54th Venice Biennale, Venice, Italy
- 2011, Fragments Americana, group exhibition, Almine Rech Gallery, Brussels
- 2012, Museum of Contemporary Art, Chicago
- 2012 Whitney Biennial, Whitney Museum of American Art, New York City
- 2013, Dépendance, dépendance, Brussels, Belgium
- 2014, Oh Brother, Maccarone, New York City
- 2016, Hammer Projects: Oscar Tuazon, Hammer Museum, Los Angeles
- 2016, Shelters, Chantal Crousel Gallery, Paris
- 2016, Ariana Reines & Oscar Tuazon, Modern Art Gallery, London
- 2017, Gardar Eide Einarsson & Oscar Tuazon, Maureen Paley Gallery, London
- 2018, Works by Joe Bradley, Oscar Tuazon, and Michael Williams, Brant Foundation Art Study Center, 941 North Street, Greenwich, Connecticut; curated by Allison Brant
- 2019, ...and other such stories, Chicago Architecture Biennial, Chicago
- 2024, Los Angeles Water School (LAWS), Morán Morán, Los Angeles
