= Elias Hansen =

Elias Hansen may refer to:

- Elias Hansen (judge) (1877–1966), a Utah Supreme Court Justice
- Elias Hansen (sculptor) (born 1979), an American sculptor
