= Johnnie Jungleguts =

American artist living in Los Angeles (born 1987)

- Born: John Martin; June 9, 1987 (age 39); New Jersey, USA

Johnnie Jungleguts (born John Martin; June 9, 1987) is an American artist living in Los Angeles. Jungleguts work spans a range of disciplines and media including drawings, radio, and video and frequently involves video games, comics, and other elements of pop culture.

== Life ==
Johnnie Jungleguts was raised in New Jersey. As a child he learned about Pokémon from Nintendo Power magazine and created a "Pokémon gym", with other players, or "trainers" where they would compete with each other. Jungleguts attended California Institute of the Arts, where he also created a Pokémon gym with other students. He has worked with several international animal welfare organizations including a refuge for big cats in Bolivia, and in the Bahamas with marine biologists working on a tracking system for bottle-nosed dolphins. In 2011 Jungleguts was awarded the Michelle Lund artist's residency at Earthfire Institute Wildlife Sanctuary in Idaho where he created the video "Don't Dream It's Over" (N. Rockies Wolves remix). The artists works at the comic book shop, Comics Vs. Toys, and in 2014 appraised a storage unit full of My Little Pony collectables on an episode of Storage Wars.

== Work ==
Johnnie Jungleguts has held several events that bring together Pokémon and art. In October 2013, he organized a panel discussion on the game at the Hammer Museum, and unsanctioned tournaments at the Chris Burden's sculpture Urban Light at the Los Angeles County Museum of Art and in the gardens Robert Irwin-designed at the Getty Museum. In 2016 Jungleguts organized the "Great Summer Pokémon Festival" at Chin's Push which included a tournament, art exhibition, Pokémon vendors, djs, and a performances by Tina Belmont and others. In 2015 Jungleguts created the exhibition "Who Is Ken Sugimori?" at Human Resources, which was named after the character designer and art director for Pokémon, Ken Sugimori. For the exhibition, the artist covered the walls of the gallery from floor to ceiling with sumi ink drawings of every Pokémon, close to 800 in total. The event also included a Pokémon tournament and Jungleguts premiered his video collage/performance art piece "I Love Everything" at the close of the event.

Johnnie Jungleguts is a member of KChung Radio. He originally hosted a half-hour show dedicated to wildlife conservation, and currently is the host of Outbreak: Comics and More. He also has conducted several interviews on KChung including Fritz Haeg, Luke Fishbeck, and wildlife illustrator Andrea Lofthouse-Quesada In 2014 KChung Radio launched KChungTV at the Hammer Museum. For the project Jungleguts hosted a Cosplay Fashion show, and conducted an interview with film critic Dave White.

Other ventures in live streaming video for the artist include the Eternal Telethon, a telethon to start an artist retirement home, and "Daytime" a daytime television show hosted by Mr. Guts in 2016 which was broadcast live from Machine Project.
