= List of artist-initiated schools =

An artist initiated school is a platform started by artists as a project, an alternative to institutional academia, or as a framework for artists working collaboratively.

== Historical ==
- Black Mountain College
- Bauhaus

== Contemporary ==
- Bruce High Quality Foundation University
- Feminist Studio Workshop at the Woman's Building
- Sundown Schoolhouse – by Fritz Haeg
- Copenhagen Free University
- Center for Urban Pedagogy
