= Ohan Breiding =

- Education: California Institute of the Arts and Scripps College
- Known for: photography, video, film and installation
- Awards: Rema Hort Mann Foundation Emerging Artist Award
- Website: https://www.ohanbreiding.com

Ohan Breiding is a Swiss-American photographer, video and installation artist, working with analog and digital technologies. Their interdisciplinary art practice explores trans-feminist visual culture, ecological care, kinship and queer narratives. Breiding is a professor in the Art Department at Williams College.

Breiding received the A.I.R Fellowship,The Hellman Award, and the Rema Hort Mann Foundation Emerging Artist Award.

== Early life and education ==
Breiding grew up in a Swiss village and returned to the area of Switzerland where they were raised to film "Belly of a Glacier" and "The Rebel Body." Breiding completed their MFA at the California Institute of the Arts and a BA at Scripps College.

== Work ==
Breiding presented "Beside the Sun" (2025) at A.I.R Gallery in Brooklyn, New York. The installation featured an assemblage of original gelatin silver reproductions, printed from discarded negatives found in the Farm Security Administration archives, depicting agrarian life in America during the Great Depression (1935). The exhibition emphasized historical connections between resource extraction and photography, noting that film products are made from mined silver salts, and farm animal byproducts are used to manufacture gelatin.

"Belly of a Glacier" combined experimental film and photography to reflect on climate change in Switzerland and the impact of global warming on the Rhône glacier. The film documents researchers at the National Science Foundation's Ice Core Facility in Colorado; and the Swiss residents of Obergoms, who draped the Rhône glacier with thermal blankets to insulate it from rising temperatures. The film combines documentary and eulogy, ending with a speculative glacier funeral, set in the future, during 2050, when scientists predict the Rhône glacier will be entirely melted. The film was exhibited with an installation of photographs and sculpture at MASS MoCA in 2025.The American Academy of Arts and Letters New York Film Commission presented a screening of "Belly of a Glacier."

"Souvenir" (2023), a two-channel video and sound installation, was a collaborative project with curator and researcher Shoghig Halajian. The film tells the story of Breiding's family member who survived the Sri Lanka tsunami; and tracks the transoceanic journey of marine organisms that traveled on plastic debris from Tōhoku, Japan, after the tsunami and Fukushima disaster. The film and series of photographs explore ecological loss and strategies for survival.

"The Rebel Body" (2019), a short film made in collaboration with Shoghig Halajian and feminist scholar Silvia Federici, author of Caliban and the Witch. The film compiles still images, archival materials, and video footage, to tell the story of Anna Göldi, the last European woman prosecuted in a witch-hunt trial and sentenced to execution (1782) in Switzerland. The film begins in the town of Glarus, where Göldi was killed and buried, capturing the landscape as a site of memorial. The film was presented in an installation with Breiding's drawings and photographs at Angels Gate Cultural Center in Los Angeles, CA."The Rebel Body" received the Switzerland International Film Festival Award.

"Epitaph for Family" (2015), Breiding's solo exhibition at Human Resources Gallery in Los Angeles, CA, was presented shortly after the U.S. Supreme Court decision to legalize gay marriage. The installation featured a three-channel video, "Magic Hour," which filmed nine people from self-identified queer communities, speaking about their personal experiences of family.
