= Anna Sew Hoy =

American sculptor

Anna Sew Hoy (born 1976, Auckland, New Zealand) is an American sculptor based in Los Angeles, California.

== Life and work ==
Sew Hoy completed her BFA at the School of Visual Arts in New York City in 1998, and she finished her MFA at Bard College in 2008.

In 2019, she was hired full-time at the University of California, Los Angeles (UCLA), where she is now Associate Professor and Ceramics Area Head in the Department of Art.

Sew Hoy is a recipient of the 2021 Anonymous Was a Woman Award, and in 2018, she was the inaugural Martha Longenecker Roth Distinguished Artist in Residence at the Department of Visual Arts, University of California, San Diego. In 2022, Sew Hoy was awarded a Guggenheim Fellowship.

Sew Hoy's work has been shown at the San Francisco Museum of Modern Art, the Orange County Museum of Art, the storefront at the Museum of Contemporary Art, Los Angeles; Koenig & Clinton, New York; the Aspen Art Museum, Colorado; the San Jose Museum of Art; and Sikkema Jenkins & Company, New York. Sew Hoy's largest public sculpture to date, Psychic Body Grotto, opened at Los Angeles State Historic Park in Spring 2017, commissioned by Los Angeles Nomadic Division (LAND) and supported by a 2015 Creative Capital Award for Visual Arts.

Her work is in the collections of the Hammer Museum at UCLA, the San Francisco Museum of Modern Art, the Los Angeles County Museum of Art, and the Museum of Contemporary Art San Diego.

== Exhibitions ==
=== Selected solo shows ===
- 2023: New Work: Anna Sew Hoy, San Francisco Museum of Modern Art, CA
- 2019: The Wettest Letter, Various Small Fires, Los Angeles, CA
- 2017: Anna Sew Hoy: Psychic Grotto Storefront, Museum of Contemporary Art, Los Angeles, CA
- 2016: Invisible Tattoo, Koenig & Clinton Gallery, New York, NY
- 2015: Magnetic Between, Aspen Art Museum, Aspen, CO
- 2015: Face No Face, Various Small Fires, Los Angeles, CA
- 2013: Nomadic Nights: Anna Sew Hoy, Math Bass, and Claire Kohne, Human Resources Los Angeles, CA
- 2013: Home Office, Various Small Fires, Los Angeles, CA
- 2011: "Nothing All Day: Anna Sew Hoy," San Jose Museum of Art, CA
- 2010: Holes, Sikkema Jenkins & Company, New York, NY
- 2008: POW!, LAXART, Los Angeles, CA
- 2007–08: Anna Sew Hoy: hook & eye, Karyn Lovegrove Gallery, Los Angeles, CA

=== Selected group shows ===
- 2022: The Hearing Trumpet, part I, Galerie Marguo, Paris (catalog)
- 2021: Abstracted Vocabularies, Museum of Contemporary Art San Diego, CA
- 2018: All Hands On Deck, Ben Maltz Gallery at Otis College of Art and Design, Los Angeles, CA
- 2018: NOMAD: Anna Sew Hoy, Amy Yao and Jennie Jieun Lee, Artist Curated Projects, LA
- 2017: From Funk to Punk: Left Coast Ceramics, curated by Peter Held, Everson Art Museum, Syracuse, NY
- 2017: Hecate, Various Small Fires, Los Angeles, CA
- 2016: L.A. Exuberance: New Gifts by Artists, Los Angeles County Museum of Art, CA
- 2015: "Surface of Color," The Pit, Los Angeles, CA
- 2015: The Heart Is the Frame, Los Angeles Contemporary Exhibitions, CA
- 2014: "Made In LA," Hammer Museum, Los Angeles Museum of Art's Installation, CA
- 2013: "Prospect 2013," Museum of Contemporary Art San Diego, CA
- 2013: "And How Are We Feeling Today?" University Art Gallery, UCSD, San Diego, CA
- 2011: "The More Things Change," San Francisco Museum of Modern Art, CA
- 2009: "Electric Mud," curated by David Pagel, Blaffer Art Museum, Houston, TX
- 2008–2009: Now You See It, Aspen Art Museum, Aspen, CO
- 2008: "California Biennial 2008," Orange County Museum of Art, CA
- 2008: "Lutker, Sew Hoy, Youngblood: California Biennial 2008," California Biennial 2008, University Art Museum, University of California, Santa Barbara, CA
- 2007: Eden's Edge: Fifteen LA Artists, Hammer Museum, UCLA, Los Angeles, CA
- 2006: "Cosmic Wonder," Yerba Buena Center for the Arts, San Francisco, CA
- 2006: One Way or Another: Asian American Art Now, Asia Society, New York, NY
- 2005: "Diamond Hand Grenade," Midway Contemporary Art, Minneapolis, MN

== Publications ==
Anna Sew Hoy: Suppose and a Pair of Jeans, Published by RAM Distribution, May 2013, ISBN 978-0983077329
