= Elias Hansen (sculptor) =

American artist (born 1979)

- Born: 1979 (age 46–47); Indianola, Washington, U.S.
- Known for: Sculpture
- Relatives: Oscar Tuazon (brother)
- Website: eliashansen.com

Elias Hansen (born 1979) is an American sculptor, glass sculptor and installation artist. He lives in New York City, and Seattle, Washington.

== Early life and education ==
Elias Hansen was born in 1979, in Indianola, Washington. Hansen is the brother of sculptor Oscar Tuazon, and they sometimes collaborate on artwork. Their parents were Anna Linzey, and John Hansen, and both were book binders. They grew up on the Port Madison Reservation, land governed by the Suquamish Indian Tribe.

He attended the New Orleans School of Glass and Print in New Orleans, and the Larson Red Angus Ranch in 2001 in Big Timber, Montana. He also studied printmaking under master printer Keiko Hara at Whitman College in Walla Walla, Washington, from 1997 to 2001.

He subsequently attended Ohio State University in Columbus, Ohio, as an artist-in-residence in 2011.

== Work ==
Hansen's work has been shown in galleries and museums since 2004.

His work is in the museum collections of the Seattle Art Museum in Seattle; Tacoma Art Museum in Tacoma; Henry Art Gallery at the University of Washington in Seattle; Boise Art Museum in Boise; Colleción Jumex in Mexico City.
