= My Barbarian =

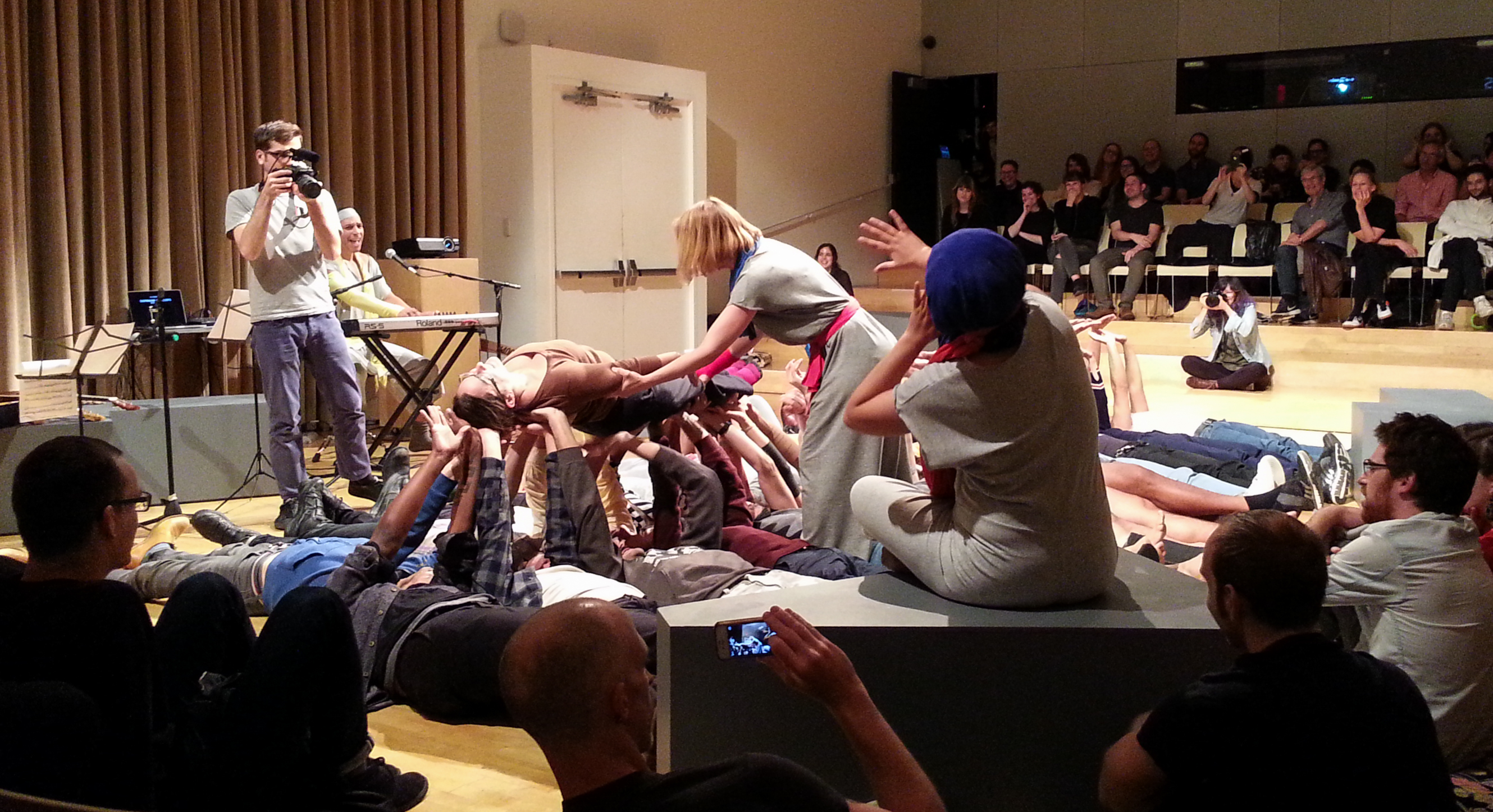
My Barbarian's Post-Living Ante-Action Theater Intro: Post-Paradise at the New Museum in October 2016.

My Barbarian is a Los Angeles based collaborative theatrical group consisting of Malik Gaines, Jade Gordon and Alexandro Segade. The trio makes site-responsive performances and video installations that use theatrical play to draw allegorical narratives out of historical dilemmas, mythical conflicts, and current political crises.

== Key collaborators ==
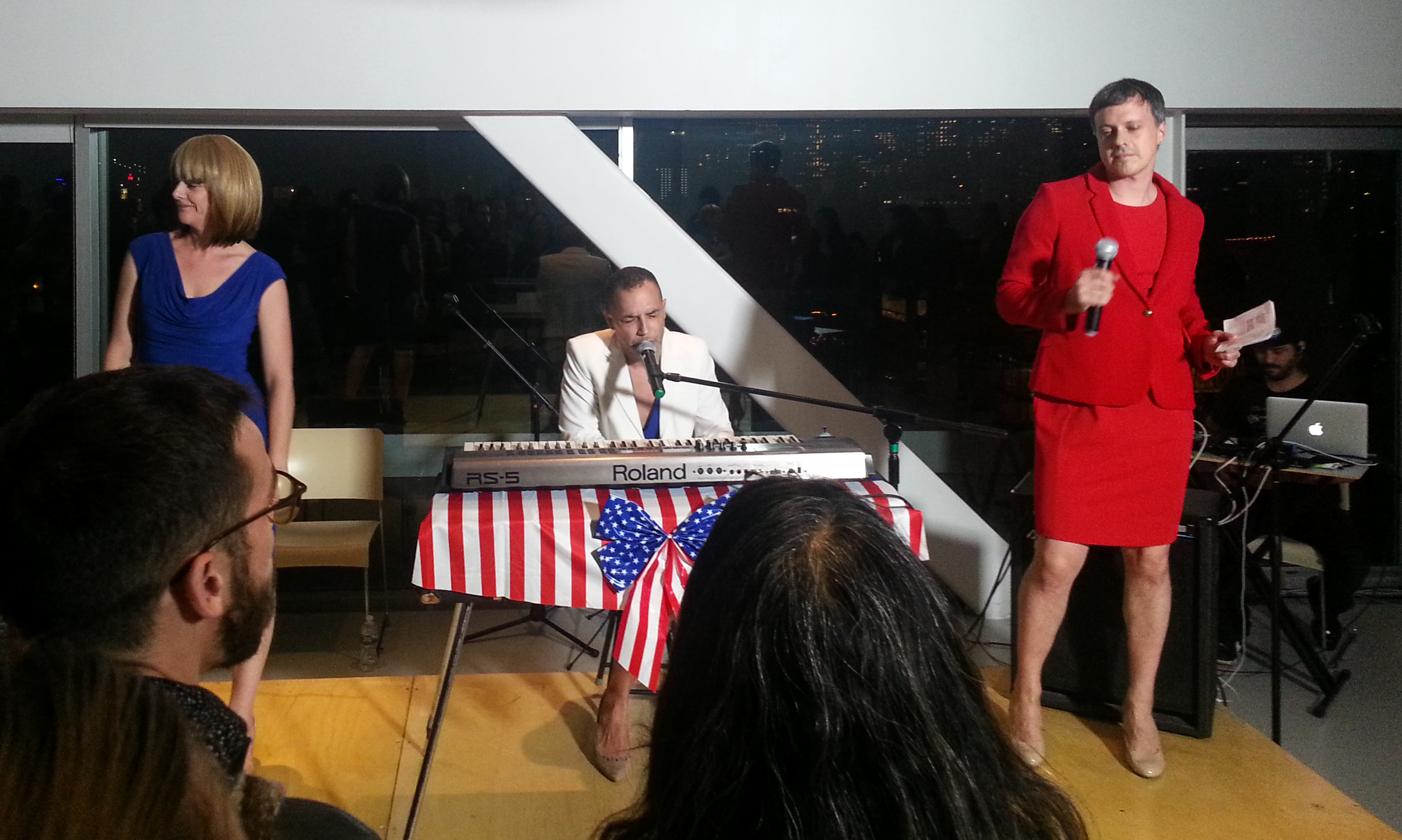
Jade Gordon, Malik Gaines, and Alexandro Segade at the My Barbarian Post-Party Dream State Caucus at the New Museum in November 2016.

- Malik Gaines (b. 1973, Visalia, California) Gaines received a B.A. in History from UCLA (1996), an MFA in Writing from Cal Arts' School of Critical Studies (1999) and a PhD in Theater and Performance Studies from UCLA (2011). Gaines is the author of Black Performance on the Outskirts of the Left: A History of the Impossible, which analyzes black art and music in the 1960s to trace out how performances of blackness rescripts and retools dominant discourses which constrain and contain black life. Reading artists through three registers—blackness (which he calls the "vanguard of negativity, the avant-garde of difference"), the period of the 1960s, and the transnational routes between the United States, West Africa, and Western Europe—Gaines explores how the "destabilizing excess of difference" challenge visual representation across sexual, racial, and political lines.
- Jade Gordon (b. 1975, Santa Rosa, California). Gordon received a BA in Theater at USC (2008) and teaches at the Stella Adler Studio of Acting in Los Angeles.
- Alex Segade (b. 1973, San Diego, California). Segade received a BA in English from UCLA (1996), studied in the School of Film and Television at USC (1997–1998), received an MFA in Interdisciplinary Studio Art from UCLA (2009), and also currently works as a solo artist. Segade is a professor of Studio Art at Hunter College.

== Other collaborators ==
- Norwood Cheek (2001–2004)
- Andy Ouchi (2001–2006)
- Lara Schnitger (2004-9)
- Pearl C. Hsiung (2002–2010)
- Scott Martin (2004–2008)
- Matthew Monahan (2004)
- Giles Miller (2004–2009)
- Richard Lee 2011

== Work ==
Since 2004, My Barbarian has shown work in group exhibitions and/or performance programs at venues including REDCAT; LACMA; Hammer Museum; LAXART; Schindler House; LACE; Steve Turner Contemporary, Los Angeles; New Museum; Whitney Museum; Studio Museum in Harlem; Participant, Inc.; P.S.1; Joe's Pub; Anton Kern Gallery, New York; Yerba Buena Center, San Francisco; MOCA, Miami; Hyde Park Art Center, Chicago; Aspen Art Museum; Contemporary Arts Forum, Santa Barbara; Vox Populi, Philadelphia; Estacion Tijuana & Lui Velazquez, Tijuana Mexico; The Power Plant, Toronto; De Appel, Amsterdam; Peres Projects, Berlin; Torpedo, Oslo; El Matadero, Madrid; Galleria Civica, Trento, Italy; Center for Contemporary Art, Tel Aviv; Townhouse Gallery, Cairo. My Barbarian was included in the 2005 and 2007 Performa Biennials, the 2006 and 2008 California Biennials, the 2007 Montreal Biennial, and the 2009 Baltic Triennial. The group has made two full-length albums of music from its performances: Cloven Soft-Shoe (2004) and California Sweet & the 7 Pagan Rights (2008).

My Barbarian had solo exhibitions with Steve Turner Contemporary in Los Angeles (2008, 2009) and at Participant, Inc. in New York (2009). In 2008, the group made a collaborative exhibition with the sculptor Lara Schnitger at Museum Het Domain, Sittard, NL, which, in 2009, traveled to the Luckman Gallery in Los Angeles.

In 2016, My Barbarian presented a residency and exhibition at the New Museum entitled The Audience is Always Right. The piece drew elements of theater, visual arts, critical practice, and specifically performance to theatricalize social issues.

== Awards and honors ==
My Barbarian won a Creative Capital grant in 2012 for their project, Post-Living Ante-Action Theater. The piece premiered at the New Museum as The Audience is Always Right. They also won a Foundation for Contemporary Arts Grants to Artists award in 2013.
