= International Journal of Art and Design Education =

International Journal of Art & Design Education
- Discipline: Education and Educational Research
- Language: English

Publication details
- Former names: Journal of Art & Design Education
- History: 1982-2001 as the Journal of Art & Design Education; 2002-Present as the International Journal of Art & Design Education
- Publisher: Wiley-Blackwell on behalf of the National Society for Education in Art and Design
- Frequency: Quarterly
- Impact factor: 0.218 (2011)

Standard abbreviations
- ISO 4: Int. J. Art Des. Educ.

Indexing
- ISSN: 1476-8062 (print); 1476-8070 (web)
- LCCN: 2006238440

Links
- Journal homepage; Online access

International Journal of Art and Design Education is a peer-reviewed academic journal published quarterly by Wiley-Blackwell on behalf of The National Society for Education in Art and Design (NSEAD). The journal was established in 1982 as the Journal of Art & Design Education and became the International Journal of Art & Design in 2002. The journal publishes articles on topics such as the visual arts, creativity, crafts, design and art history in educational contexts and learning situations.

According to the Journal Citation Reports, the journal has a 2011 impact factor of 0.218, ranking it 181st out of 206 journals in the category "Education & Educational Research".
