= Katie Grinnan =

American contemporary artist (born 1970)

Katie Grinnan (born 1970), is an American multidisciplinary contemporary artist and educator who synthesizes sculpture, photography, sound, video, and data tracking to investigate relationships among visual, kinesthetic, and cognitive experiences.

== Early life and education ==
Katie Grinnan spent her childhood in Richmond, Virginia. She subsequently relocated to Pittsburgh, Pennsylvania, where she attended Carnegie Mellon University (CMU) and studied painting. In 1991, she traveled to Florence, Italy, to attend the Studio Arts Center International. In 1992, she earned her Bachelor of Fine Arts (BFA) from CMU and completed a nine-week summer residency at the Skowhegan School of Painting and Sculpture in Maine. Grinnan later moved to Los Angeles to pursue graduate studies in art at the University of California, Los Angeles (UCLA), where she obtained her Master of Fine Arts (MFA) in 1999. Grinnan is an Associate Professor and Head of the Sculpture department at California State University, Long Beach (CSULB).

== Artistic practice ==
Grinnan's work focuses on the interplay between the visual, kinesthetic, and cognitive experiences of the body to examine how these systems influence our perception of reality and construction of the self. Initially exploring the intersection of photography and sculpture, she used photographs for their sculptural qualities as layers of visual and spatial perception that sought to reintroduce the sensory experience of the image. From there, Grinnan’s work shifted to examine the temporal dimensions of the body and somatic experience, emphasizing elasticity and performance rather than the static form. Many of her sculptures incorporate performed gestures as systems of movement, casting her body in multiple positions to present the entire motion as a unified form that occupies cinematic space. Frequently engaging with data systems derived from diverse ideological frameworks, Grinnan has mapped motion systems that include astrology charts and EEG diagrams. These diagrams have been translated into objects that function as instruments producing sounds, scores, and choreographies, privileging an experiential and somatic interpretation of the information they convey. In her most recent work, Grinnan has dissolved the figure, which often functions as a latent form enacted by nonhuman systems. In these works, she investigates the resonances and dissonances between the epistemological and visual ecologies. She aims to shift the focus away from human agency to promote an enmeshment of human and nonhuman worlds.

=== Works ===
Phantom Limb (2003), was first exhibited at Acme in Los Angeles during Grinnan's solo show Free, Free for All, Free Fall. Grinnan incorporated elements of the external environment into the gallery by suspending a tree branch that appeared to emerge from the gallery wall. A nest constructed from palm fronds and torn photocollage was balanced in the limb of the tree. Additionally, a strip of gray-colored film was displayed on the wall and replicated the shadow cast by the gallery lighting on the crutch, creating a perceptual divide between the actual shadow, the photographically rendered shadow, and the phantom limb.

Brainwaves (2009-2011), mixed media

In Brainwaves (2009-2011), Grinnan constructs a large orb-shaped form composed of Plexiglas shards affixed to a metal armature, metaphorically illustrating how the brain shapes perception from environmental stimuli. Within of the brain sphere model, the interior contains screenshots that Grinnan has transferred to film mounted to Plexiglass, then drawn and painted over, visuals discovered during her research on the brain and quantum mechanics. These include depictions of significant locations from her life, such as her childhood home, current residence, and various places she has visited. At the center of the orb, a projector beam illuminates a separate piece of white fabric, which serves as a screen, showing a video of a figure repeatedly turning away. The work implies how gathered information is processed and projected outward, while new impressions of the external world are accumulated in the mind.

Mirage (2011), friendly plastic, enamel paint, and sand.

In Mirage (2011), Grinnan created multiple molds of her body performing the continuous movements of the sun salutation sequence, a yoga pose, casting the resulting overlapping stroboscopic forms in “friendly plastic.” The work examines the body's role within space and time by translating discrete actions and movements into a static form that encapsulates both temporality and physicality, presenting them as a synthesis of multiple potential states simultaneously, analogous to quantum superposition, where only one state is observable at any given moment.

In 2015, Grinnan participated in a sleep study at the laboratory of the non-invasive Brain-Machine Interface (BMI) systems at The University of Houston (UH). Noticing that the EEG device's graph resembled a landscape, she translated a 5-second fragment of EEG data gathered during the 8-hour study into a sculptural landscape. Akin to the compression of temporal and kinesthetic experiences as the brain summarizes physical actions and continuous periods of time, Grinnan bridged the peaks and valleys of the sculpted EEG landscape with a wire, creating an instrument that produces sound. In 2019, it was used in a performance piece titled Five Seconds of Dreaming. Was performed by Kozue Matsumoto and Eugene Moon at the Desert Why? Symposium, Annenberg Theater, Palm Springs Art Museum, and Desert X, Palm Springs, CA.

In The Sensitives (2022), Grinnan produces wall-mounted viewer-activated sculptures made of oxidized copper, circuit boards, sensors, and touch-sensitive suckers. Each sucker, modeled after the chemo-tactile sensory system of an octopus, emits a tone upon activation. The sequence of tones is determined by a fragment of an octopus's genetic material. This iterative score generates an expanded signaling system, forming a mode of communication that operates independently of, yet in parallel with, human syntax.

== Exhibitions ==
Grinnan has exhibited at the Museum of Contemporary Art Los Angeles (MOCA), and the Modern Art Oxford in the UK, Hammer Museum and the Whitney Museum in New York.

== Collections ==
- UCLA Hammer Museum, Los Angeles, CA
- Museum of Contemporary Art, Los Angeles, CA
- Los Angeles County Museum of Art, Los Angeles, CA
- Virginia Museum of Fine Art, Richmond, VA
- Nevada Museum of Art, Reno, NV

== Awards ==
- 2006, Guggenheim Fellowship, Pollock - Krasner Award
- 2007, AXA Artist Award
- 2010, California Foundation Grant
- 2012, Center for Cultural Innovation Artist’s Resource Completion Grant (ARC)
- 2018, City of Los Angeles (COLA) Individual Artist Fellowship
- 2025, Creative Capital Award
