= Math Bass =

American artist

Math Bass (b. 1981, New York, New York) is an artist known for fusing performance with paintings and sculptures using formal elements like solid colors, geometric imagery, raw materials, and visual symbols. Bass has exhibited at Overduin & Kite, Human Resources, and Vielmetter Los Angeles. The artist was featured in the 2012 Made in LA Biennial at the Hammer Museum and in May 2015, MoMA PS1 presented Bass's first solo museum show, Math Bass: Off the Clock, organized by Mia Locks. Bass currently lives and works in Los Angeles, California.

== Early life and education ==
Bass received a BA from Hampshire College in 2003 and an MFA from the University of California Los Angeles in 2011.

== Work ==
Bass's practice explores both representation and abstraction and recurring themes include anthropomorphic structures, architectural elements, and altered signage.

At Overduin & Co in 2014, the artist turned the gallery space into a geometric, visual playground. On the last day of the show, the artist along with fellow artists Eden Batki, Lauren Davis Fisher, and Lee Relvas staged a call-and-response recitation.

In 2018, Bass debuted a solo, site-specific mural for the Hammer Museum's lobby wall. The mural depicted several stylized forms such as bones-as- speech-bubbles as well as teeth that looked like a set of stairs leading into a crocodile’s mouth.

Bass ventured into oil painting and figuration for their 2021 solo exhibition at Vielmetter titled, Desert Veins. Paintings in the exhibition included a snake curled around a nest of eggs, a camel skeleton, a brick wall, and a grave marker.

== Selected exhibitions ==
Solo Exhibitions
Year	Exhibitions	Location	Reference
2015	Off the Clock	Museum of Modern Art, New York	
2017-18	Crowd Rehearsal	Jewish Museum, New York	
2017	Domino Kingdom	Tanya Leighton Gallery, Berlin, Germany	
2017	Serpentine Door	Yuz Museum, Shanghai, China	
2017	Over the Top: Math Bass and the Imperial Court SF	Oakland Museum of California	
2019	To Name A Few	Tanya Leighton	
2019-2020	Fill It Up Silver	Various Small Fires	
2021	Desert Veins	Vielmetter Los Angeles.	
