= Pearl C. Hsiung =

Taiwanese-born American artist

Pearl C. Hsiung is a Taiwan-born American multimedia artist based in Los Angeles.

== Biography ==
Pearl C. Hsiung was born in Taichung, Taiwan and raised and educated in California. However, she and her brother, artist Michael C. Hsiung, spent time in Taiwan during several summer breaks from school. Hsiung received her a BA in art from University of California, Los Angeles in 1997. After graduating from college, she began a career in commercial fashion design, but quickly found herself unfulfilled. She earned her MFA in art from Goldsmiths, University of London, in 2004.

She primarily works in painting, installation and video. Hsiung's earlier works reflect her Taiwanese roots and Los Angeles upbringing in its use of bright colors, hard-edged application techniques, and graphics informed by the quotidian and popular aesthetics of both cultures. The subject usually focuses on nature and how humans relate and interact with and within it. Through her artwork Hsiung looks to understand how as humans we see and apply biological, social and cultural patterns in natural environments.

Hsiung's painting style can be described as contemporary surrealism with a mixture of sci-fi and other components. Currently, she is a working artist and arts educator based in Los Angeles, California. In 2022, her tile artwork High Prismatic, was installed at the Grand Ave Arts/Bunker Hill subway station of the Los Angeles County Metropolitan Transportation Authority.

== Style and artwork ==
Hsiung works in a variety of media including paper, video, and paint. Hsiung uses a style where she attempts to imitate computer graphics by hand while using mural-like bright colors. Hsiung's bold landscapes are influenced by her summers in Taiwan as well as Southern California and Los Angeles street murals and advertisements. She creates psychedelic vistas in many of her works that she figuratively relates to consciousness. Hsiung also uses humor in her art work to critique culture identity and to challenge art making and common notions.

=== Overfiend (2003) ===
This painting is oil-based enamel on canvas. This abstract landscape features an eyeball as a giant sunset overlooking a beach where an egg is laying in the sun. The background is dark blue with palm trees in silhouette. With this painting, Hsiung presents her anthropomorphic style which is present in many of her paintings.

=== Power Chode Homina (2004) ===
In this painting, oil on canvas, viewers interpret her multicultural influence in the use of color and digital painting. The graphics she depicts are done in a form that makes them appear videogame like. This painting has alienlike figures depicted on a space like landscape. Viewers see nothing surrounding the figures other than themselves and smoke. The vibrant use of color creates a digital imitation look that reflects the influence of graffiti and mural painting commonly seen in the streets of L.A. Hsiung in this painting and like in others has a humorous approach and creates a joke about the phallus.

=== Volcanic Ash (2010) ===
In this video work, Hsiung uses her trademark surrealist style and includes music performance and composing. This six minute long piece is a music video which she uses the lyrics to describe a geological reality. Her work is more than just a sci-fi and psychedelic fantasy, she explores natural cycles of destruction and rebirth.

=== Yellowstoner (2014) ===
This video work by Hsiung brings her painting style to life. This piece takes place in Yellowstone National Park, it is a thirty-minute video that took Hsiung almost four years to complete. In this video we see a character, no gender specified, exploring this landscape through waterfalls and the Geothermal areas of Yellowstone. The character is shown doing cartwheels through the fields and other simple acts that describe the character's enjoyment of the landscape. The way Yellowstone is captured by Hsiung depicts it as an otherworldly realm by showing frames of the bubbling mud puddles and exploding geysers as well as the rainbows. This video work by Hsiung is meant to portray the rhythm of nature and human interaction.

== Solo exhibitions ==
Pearl C. Hsiung's first solo exhibition was back in 2004 while she lived in Britain. In her debut at MW Projects in London, Hsiung holds Overfiend where she shared a couple paintings and transformed a room to fit her artistic aesthetic that would fit her other-worldly art.

- 2019 – Fault Zone, Visitor Welcome Center, Los Angeles, CA
- 2018 – Two Faces, One Die, College of the Canyons Art Gallery, Valencia, CA
- 2017 – Full Gorge, Visitor Welcome Center, Los Angeles, CA
- 2015 – Whiskeytown, O.N.O, Los Angeles, CA
- 2014 – Yellowstoner, Human Resources, Los Angeles, CA
- 2011 – Gusher: Pearl C Hsiung, Selected Works 2003–2011, Vincent Price Art Museum, East Los Angeles College, Monterey Park, CA
- 2010 – Never Ends, Steve Turner Contemporary, Los Angeles, CA
- 2007 – Eroto Erupto Infinito, Steve Turner Contemporary, Los Angeles, CA
- 2006 – To the Big Life, Max Wigram Gallery, London, UK
- 2004 – Pearl C. Hsiung, Upriver Gallery, Kunming, China
- 2004 – Overfiend, MW Projects, London, UK

== Select group exhibitions ==
- 2022 – 3 Artists, 39+ Art Space, Singapore
- 2022 – The Healing Trumpet, Marguo Gallery, Paris, France
- 2019 – New Suns, Páramo Gallery, Guadalajara, Mexico
- 2019 – Candlewood Arts Festival, Borrego Springs, CA
- 2018 – The Beyond: Georgia O'Keeffe and Contemporary Art, Crystal Bridges Museum of American Art, Bentonville, AR
- 2016 – Second Wave: Aesthetics of the 80s in Today's Contemporary Art, UCR ARTSblock, Sweeney Art Gallery, Riverside, CA
- 2014 – Tender Buttons, Hockney Gallery, Royal College of Art, London, UK
- 2013 – The Archaic Revival - Rotterdam, Zic Zerp Gallery, Rotterdam, Holland
- 2012 – Made In L.A. 2012, Hammer Museum, Westwood, CA
- 2011 – The Archaic Revival, Las Cienegas Projects, Culver City, CA
- 2010 – New Art for a New Century: Contemporary Acquisitions 2000–2010, Orange County Museum of Art, Newport Beach, CA
- 2009 – OZ: New Offerings from the Angel City, Regional Museum of Guadalajara, Mexico
- 2004 – Expander, The Royal Academy of Arts, London, UK

== Selected screenings ==
- 2017 – Fair Play, Brickell Center, Miami, FL. M.A.R.S. Festival, Art Share L.A., Los Angeles, CA
- 2015 – Opening Night, The Situation Room, Glassel Park, CA
- 2012 – Cinemarfa, Marfa, Texas
- 2011 – The Big Screen Project, Medial Lounge, CAA Conference 2011, New York. Whole Halves, Human Resources, Los Angeles, USA
- 2006 – Dreamcenter LA, Drake Hotel, Toronto, Canada
- 2005 – Sparks Video International, Spark Contemporary Art Space, New York, USA
- 2004 – Timepop, Prince Charles Cinema, London, UK

== Honors and awards ==
- 2015 – CCF Fellowship for Visual Arts, Getty Fellow 2015, Mid-Career Artist
- 2015 – National Park Services - Artist in Residence, Santa Monica Mountains, Santa Monica, CA
- 2014 – National Park Services - Artist in Residence, Whiskeytown National Recreation Area, Redding, CA
- 2014 – Pearl C. Hsiung presents Original Face, P3 Studio Residency curated by the Art Production Fund, New York, NY
- 2012 – We Are Talking Pyramids, Public Art Residency at Heart of Los Angeles (HOLA), Los Angeles, CA
- 2010 – USA Projects Grant, United States Artists, Los Angeles, CA
- 2003 – Red Mansion Art Prize and Residency in Kunming China, Red Mansion, London,
