= Center for Urban Pedagogy =

Nonprofit organization in New York City, U.S.

- Abbreviation: CUP
- Formation: 1997
- Founder: Damon Rich
- Location: 232 Third Street, Brooklyn, NY 11215, United States

The Center for Urban Pedagogy (CUP) is a 501(c)(3) nonprofit organization located in Gowanus, Brooklyn, New York City that works to improve the quality of public participation in urban planning and community design.

== Background ==
CUP was founded in 1997 (officially incorporated in 2001) by the artist and architect Damon Rich with co-founders Oscar Tuazon (artist), Stella Bugbee (graphic designer), Josh Breitbart (media activist), Jason Anderson (architect), AJ Blandford (architectural historian), Sarah Dadush (attorney), Althea Wasow (filmmaker), and Rosten Woo (policy analyst).

As of May 2023, CUP is led by Executive Director, Pilar Finuccio. Prior to Pilar, Christine Gaspar led CUP from 2009 through 2022. Prior to Christine, CUP was led by Rosten Woo and Damon Rich.

CUP's mission is "to use the power of art and design to increase meaningful civic engagement in partnership with marginalized communities." For example, working with the Street Vendor Project, CUP created the "Vendor Power" fold-out poster informing NYC's street vendors on the law and their rights, as well as goals for changing the system.

During the fall of 2003, at the Storefront for Art and Architecture, CUP organized the exhibition The City Without a Ghetto exploring the history of Urban Renewal in New York City.

In November 2018, CUP partnered with New York's Drawing Center to advocate civic engagement through drawing and design.

== Awards and recognition ==
CUP received the 2011 Rockefeller CIF award to develop its Public Access Design project. The project aimed to connect graphic designers and distressed communities.

The Smithsonian magazine lauded the center in 2016 for producing educational kits that clarify the intricacies of New York's zoning and systems. CUP received the Smithsonian's National Design Award that year.

In 2017, CUP founder Damon Rich was honored with a $625,000 MacArthur Fellowship "genius" grant, to be used at his discretion over a period of five years.

== Bibliography ==
- Francisca Benítez, "La Ciudad Como Escuela", ARQ, December 2006, p. 28.
- Carly Berwick, "Civic Boosters", Metropolis, February 2002.
- Bill Menking, (2009). "The Center for Urban Pedagogy (CUP)". Architectural Design : A.D. 79 (1): 76.
- Lize Mogel, and Alexis Bhagat. (2008). An atlas of radical cartography. Los Angeles: Journal of Aesthetics & Protest Press.
- Perini, Julie (2010). "Art as Intervention: A Guide to Today's Radical Art Practices". In Team Colors Collective (ed.). Uses of a Whirlwind: Movement, Movements, and Contemporary Radical Currents in the United States. AK Press. ISBN 9781849350167.
- Rich, Damon, “Notes on Pedagogy as Aesthetic Practice” in Experimental Geography: Radical Approaches to Landscape, Cartography, and Urbanism, edited by Nato Thompson. New York: Independent Curators International and Melville House, 2008.
- Architecture for Humanity (Organization). (2006). Design like you give a damn: architectural responses to humanitarian crises. New York, NY: Metropolis Books.
- Rich, Damon, "Big Plans & Little People," Lotus International 124, Milan, Italy, July 2005.
- Zacks, Stephen. (2011). "Détournement or the Misguided Oppositional Ideology of the Posturban College-Educated Elite". Tarp Architectural Manual. : Spring 2011:14.
- "On Education, Pluralist Planning, New Institutions and Language: Public Interview with Damon Rich"
- Rice, Michael, "An Architektur", September 2008.
