= Damon Rich =

American urban planner (born 1975)

- Known for: Installation art, Urban Design
- Movement: Social Practice
- Awards: 2004-5 MacDowell Fellowship, 2007 Loeb Fellowship, 2015 Charles Cummings Award, 2016 National Design Award, 2017 MacArthur Foundation Fellowship

Damon Rich (born 1975 in Creve Coeur, Missouri) is a Newark, New Jersey–based designer, urban planner, and visual artist known for investigating the politics of the built environment. He attended Deep Springs College and received a B.A. (1997) from Columbia College of Columbia University. His work looks at the shaping of the world through laws, finance, and politics. He explains his approach as follows: "My exhibitions function as a kind of case study or experiment; each begins with a group of investigators who know little about the subject at hand, acting as stand-ins for the general public." In 1997, Rich founded the Center for Urban Pedagogy (CUP), a New York City–based nonprofit organization that uses the power of design and art to improve civic engagement.

Rich served as the Planning Director & Chief Urban Designer for the City of Newark, New Jersey, from 2008 to 2015 where he led the design and construction of the city's first riverfront parks, was founding director of the city's first public art program, and was primary author of the city's first new zoning law since 1954. He now serves as partner with design and planning practice Hector.

Rich was the recipient of a MacArthur Genius Grant from the John D. and Catherine T. MacArthur Foundation in 2017.
