= Indianola, Washington =

Indianola, Washington dəxʷsisaaʔ
- CDP
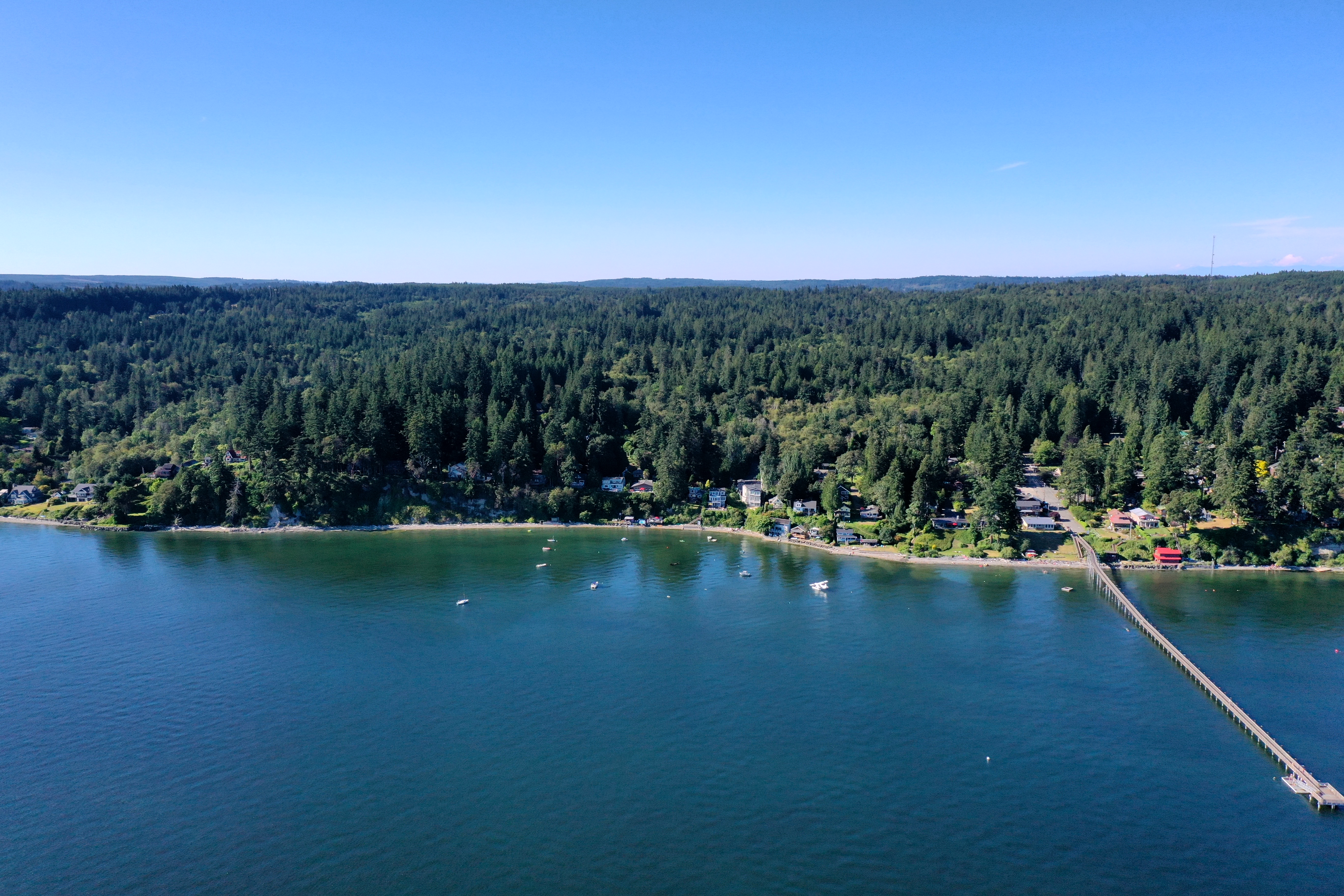

- Location of Indianola, Washington
- Coordinates: 47°45′5″N 122°30′32″W
- Country: United States
- State: Washington
- County: Kitsap

Area
  - Total: 5.3 sq mi (13.8 km^{2})
  - Land: 4.9 sq mi (12.6 km^{2})
  - Water: 0.46 sq mi (1.2 km^{2})
- Elevation: 246 ft (75 m)

Population (2020)
  - Total: 3,664
  - Density: 624/sq mi (240.8/km^{2})
- Time zone: UTC-8 (Pacific (PST))
  - Summer (DST): UTC-7 (PDT)
- ZIP Code: 98342
- Area code(s): 360, 564
- FIPS code: 53-33280
- GNIS feature ID: 2408424

Indianola (Lushootseed: dəxʷsisaaʔ lit. "dizzy") is a census-designated place (CDP) in Kitsap County, Washington, United States, located on the north shore of Port Madison on the Port Madison Indian Reservation, home of the Suquamish Indian Tribe. The population was 3,664 at the 2020 census. It was originally established as a summer community and was a stop for Mosquito Fleet ferries until the 1950s.

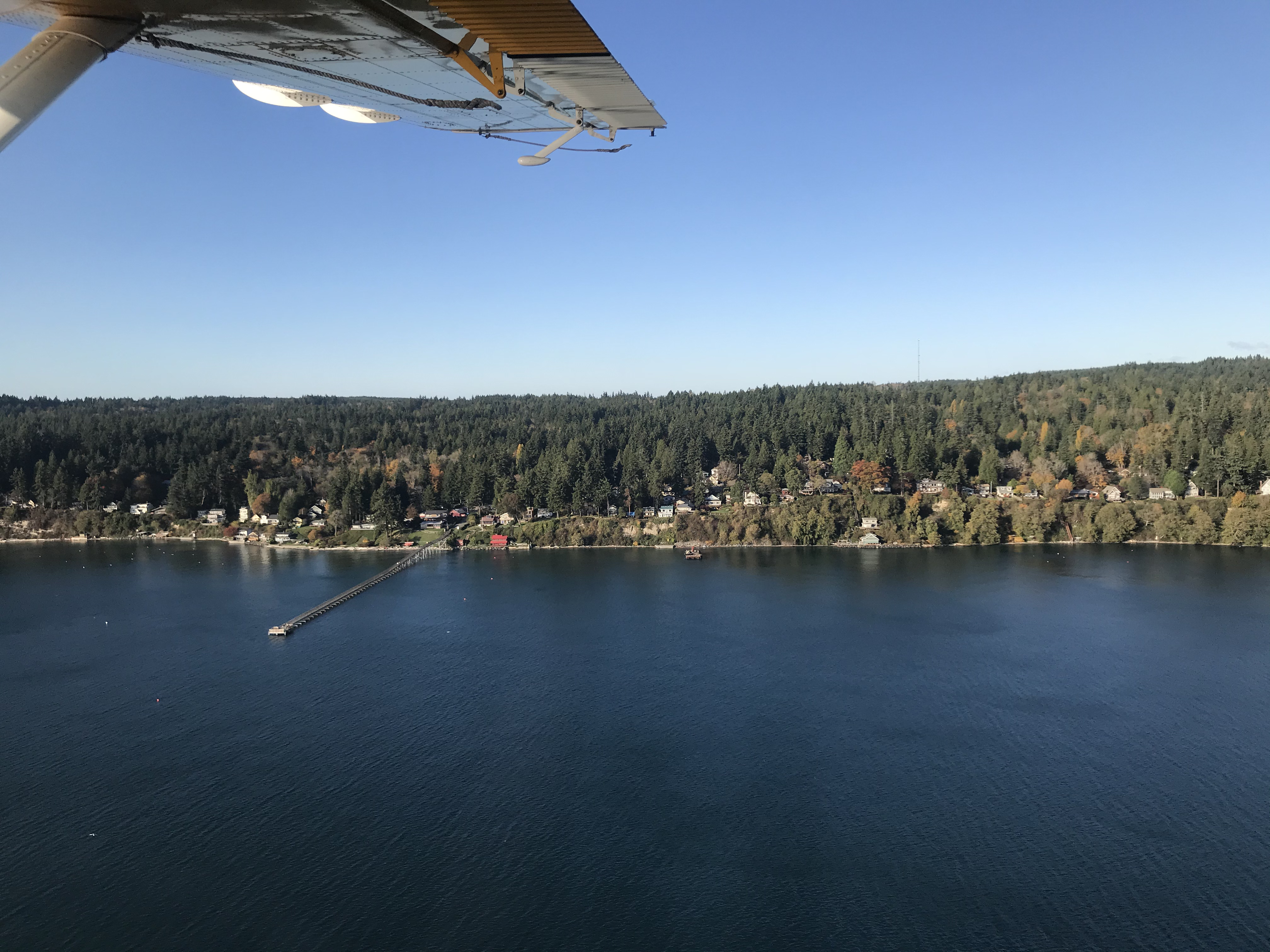
Indianola beach seen from a seaplane.

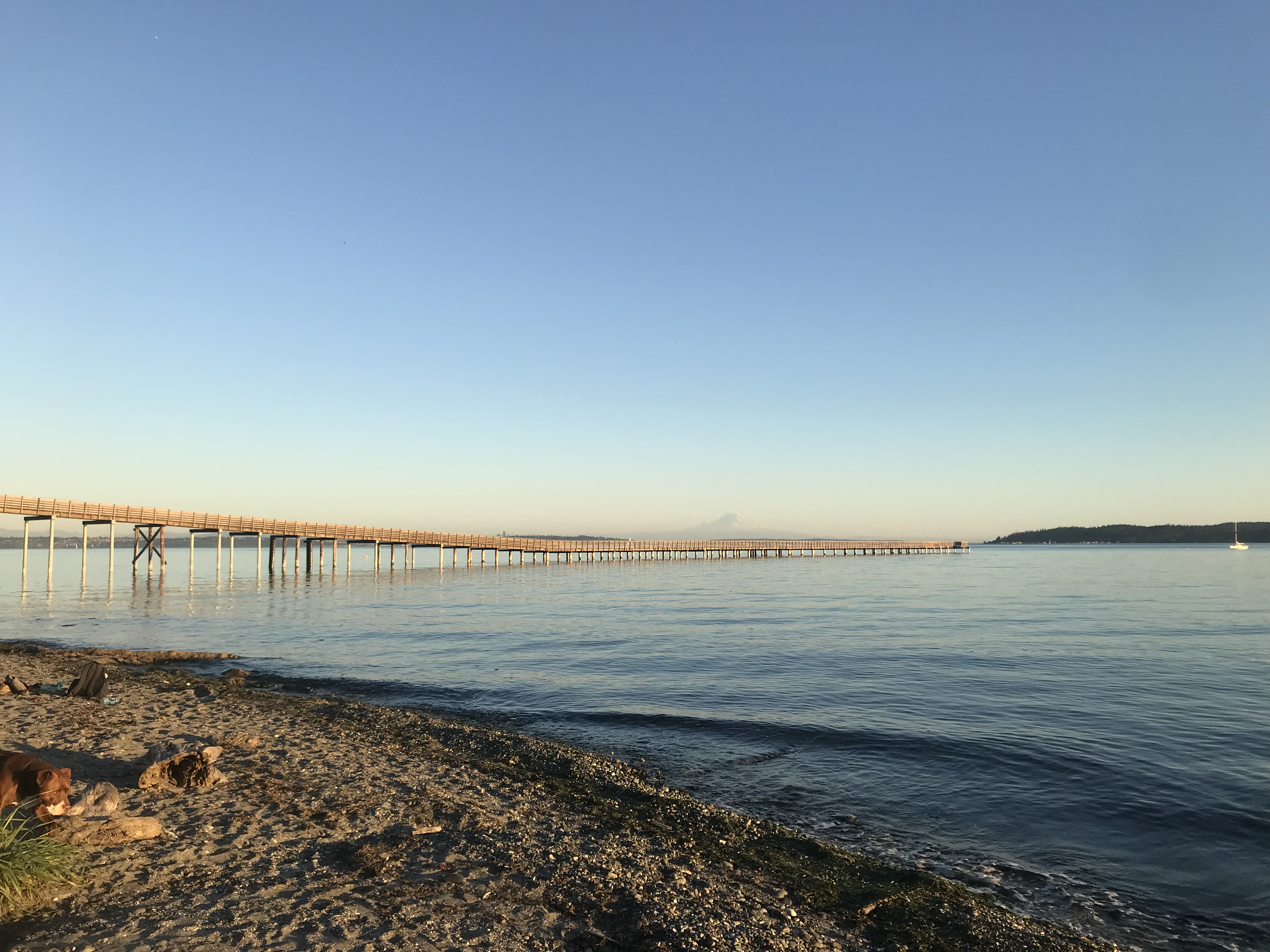
Indianola Dock, as seen from the beach.

== Geography ==
Indianola is located on the north shore of Port Madison, just east of Miller Bay. It is south of Kingston and northeast of Suquamish.

According to the United States Census Bureau, the CDP has a total area of 5.3 square miles (13.8 km^{2}), of which, 4.8 square miles (12.6 km^{2}) of it is land and 0.5 square miles (1.2 km^{2}) of it (8.82%) is water.

== History ==
Indianola was formed on the portion of the Port Madison Indian Reservation which had been allotted to KaKue aka "Beedee" in 1886. KaKue died in December 1886 leaving no will, and his wife Tu Tue Tue was sole heir. Tu Tue Tue died four years later in 1890 leaving a brother and a sister, Tar-de-blu, and a daughter Katie. After the death of Tar-de-blu the estate was settled in 1909 leaving Chief Jacob, the son of Tar-de-blu, as sole heir. When Katie died childless in 1896 her husband Alpheus Loughrey was sole heir. Alpheus had four sons from a previous marriage and the allotment eventually passed to his sons. Alpheus was a white man who had married Katie, the daughter of KaKue and Tu-Tue-Tue. KaKue was not related to Cyrus Beede Pickrell who was an Indian agent in Suquamish from 1906 to 1916 or to Cyrus Beede who was at the time the US Indian Inspector.

In 1906, the U.S. Army bought a portion of the nearby town of Suquamish from the Suquamish Tribe for the stated purpose of constructing a fort. Instead, the land was sold to non-native developers. Many Suquamish members of the town moved to Indianola. During this period, Suquamish children were forced to attend American Indian residential schools run by the U.S. government, which sought to erase Suquamish culture. The U.S. government also used the 1887 Dawes Act to take reservation land from the Suquamish who lived on it, which included land in Indianola. Chief William Rogers, of the Suquamish and Duwamish, moved to Indianola in 1902 after white settlers repeatedly burned down the Duwamish longhouses he had lived in near current-day Renton. His land in Indianola was taken in 1910, and he moved with his family to another part of the Port Madison Reservation. Kitsap County laws also affected the town's land ownership: at the time, the county used racial restrictive covenants to require that land only be sold to white buyers.

Development of Indianola began in 1916 with the formation of the Indianola Beach Land Company by W. L. Gazzam to promote real estate sales on the land owned by the Loughreys. A dock and a store were built as amenities to attract buyers. From the beginning, Indianola has been a vacation community, with its population inflating considerably in the summertime.

In the early 20th century, most transportation on Puget Sound was by steamer, and a community's dock was often its only lifeline to the outside world. Such was the case for the young community of Indianola Beach, and by 1918 a steamer was docking there every weekend. Daily ferry service was initiated in 1919 when Carl Hendrix organized twelve passengers to pay in advance for one year's daily service between Indianola Beach and Seattle. Hendrix and his wife established a school the same year.

Cyrus Beede Pickrell, who had been Indian Agent for the Port Madison Reservation, moved to Indianola Beach from Suquamish with his family in 1920. Postal service had been discontinued, so when the Pickrells opened a new store, they housed the postal operation at Indianola Beach with Cyrus as Postmaster. Around this time, the Postmaster General took issue with the double name of Indianola Beach and the post office was renamed Kitsap in honor of Chief Kitsap of the Suquamish tribe.

Plans to establish a library and community hall were cause for much activity and development in the 1920s. Lots were auctioned off and a carnival was held in 1927 to raise funds. The Indianola Beach Improvement Club was incorporated in 1928 to raise more building money. The club acquired some lots from W. L. Gazzam, which were raffled off with the proceeds going toward the purchase of property on which to build the structure. The Indianola Clubhouse was finally built in 1930.

By 1929, three passenger boats left the Indianola dock for Seattle every day, and the 1930s brought more connections to the outside world. A power line was strung in 1930, and phone service was established in 1934. The Port of Indianola was established in 1933 after a special election. The dock, which had previously only accommodated passengers, was widened and reinforced to allow auto access. In 1935, Kitsap County began taking surveys to build a road to connect Indianola and Suquamish; when the road was completed in 1939, it was the first time Indianola was accessible by other means of transportation than boat.

Road access to Indianola changed the character of the community somewhat, as the community now had access to more amenities in Kitsap and was no longer self-contained. The school closed in 1941 after more than twenty years of classes. Kitsap County's naval bases and facilities brought a population boom during World War II, and many families settled in Indianola. Ferry service was discontinued in Fall of 1951 after the Agate Pass Bridge opened and the Washington State Ferries took over ferry service on Puget Sound.

It was not until after 1957 that the name of the post office was changed from Kitsap to Indianola, due to the confusion caused by its sharing a name with the county.

During the 1980s, the Suquamish Tribe bought land in Indianola to build affordable housing for their members. Non-native residents campaigned against the development, and the tribe asked the American Friends Service Committee to help improve relations between the two communities. Over the next decade, inter-community groups met and helped build a baseball field, perform a ceremony to bless the land, and record oral histories with 12 elders from the town.

In 2020, relations between non-native Indianola residents and the Suquamish Tribe deteriorated following efforts by beachfront property owners in Indianola to restrict access to the town's beach. In response, several groups of Indianola residents focused on sharing the Suquamish history of the town and advocating for ways to return town land to the Suquamish Tribe.

== Demographics ==
Historical population
Census	Pop.	Note	%±
2010	3,500		—
2020	3,664		4.7%

As of the census of 2000, there were 3,026 people, 1,140 households, and 855 families residing in the CDP. The population density was 623.6 people per square mile (240.9/km^{2}). There were 1,304 housing units at an average density of 268.7/sq mi (103.8/km^{2}). The racial makeup of the CDP was 87.7% White, 0.5% African American, 5.3% Native American, 1.4% Asian, 0.3% Pacific Islander, 0.8% from other races, and 3.9% from two or more races. Hispanic or Latino of any race were 2.7% of the population.

There were 1,140 households, out of which 40.4% had children under the age of 18 living with them, 62.9% were married couples living together, 8.8% had a female householder with no husband present, and 25.0% were non-families. 19.0% of all households were made up of individuals, and 4.3% had someone living alone who was 65 years of age or older. The average household size was 2.65 and the average family size was 3.04.

In the CDP, the population was spread out, with 29.6% under the age of 18, 5.0% from 18 to 24, 33.7% from 25 to 44, 24.1% from 45 to 64, and 7.5% who were 65 years of age or older. The median age was 36 years. For every 100 females, there were 101.1 males. For every 100 females age 18 and over, there were 97.2 males.

The median income for a household in the CDP was $52,852, and the median income for a family was $60,028. Males had a median income of $43,633 versus $30,208 for females. The per capita income for the CDP was $22,895. About 3.2% of families and 5.3% of the population were below the poverty line, including 7.3% of those under age 18 and 4.2% of those age 65 or over.
