= Seattle =

City in Washington, United States

Seattle Lushootseed: dᶻidᶻəlal̕ič
- City
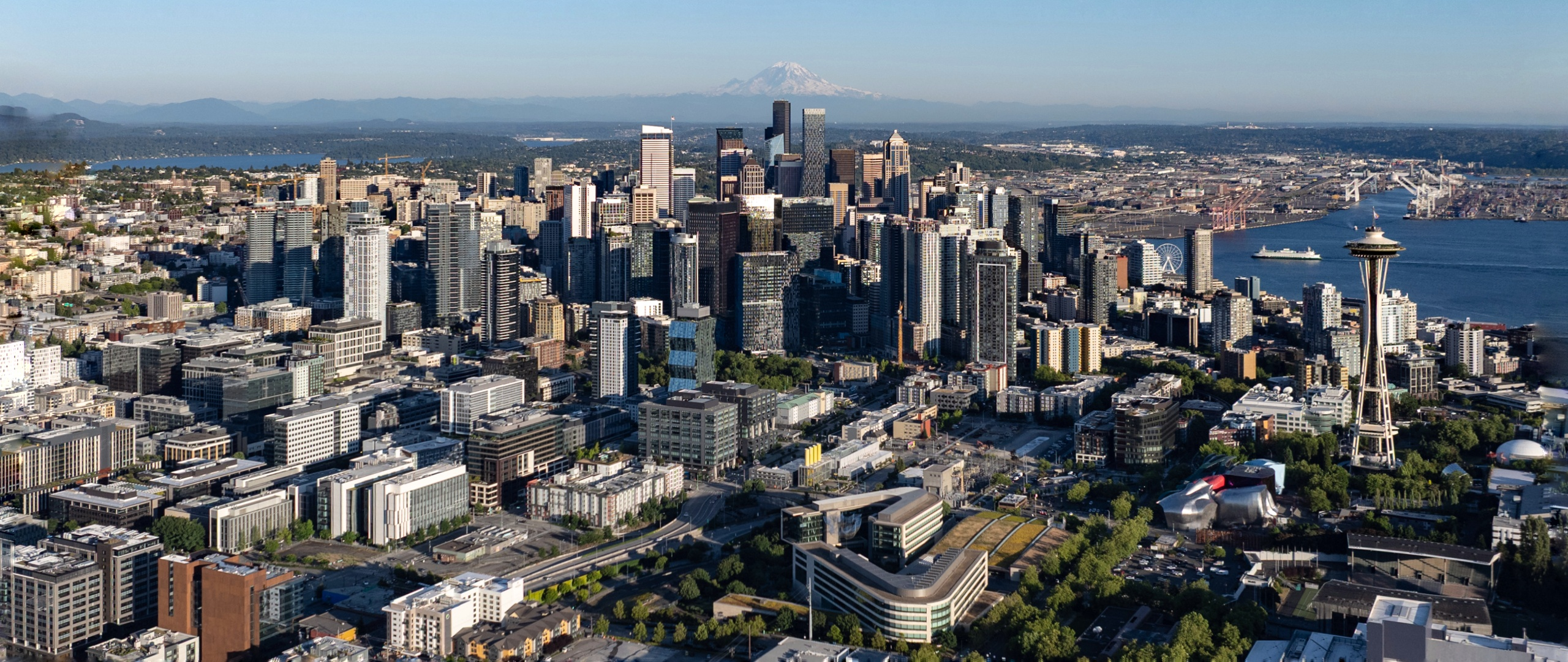
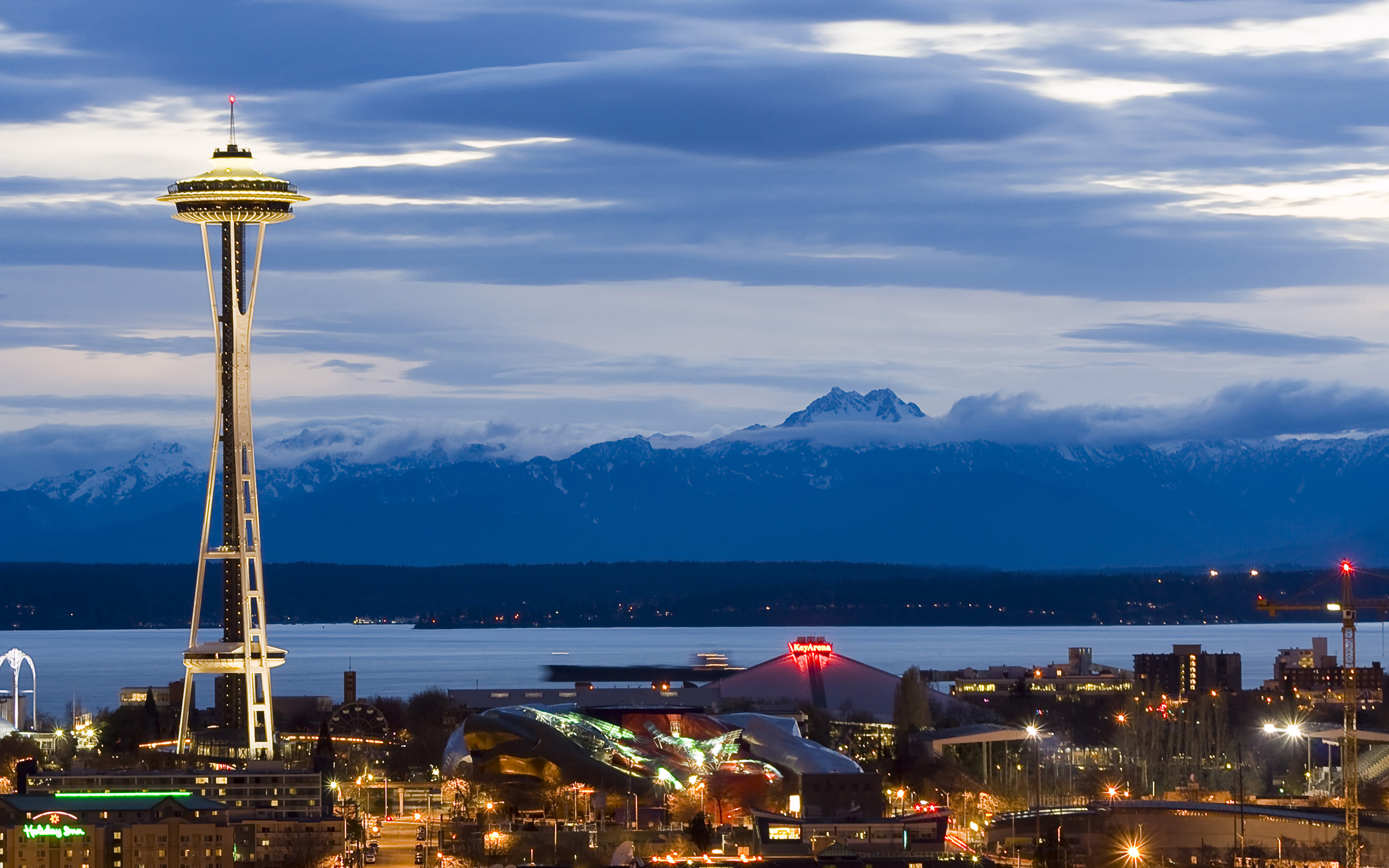
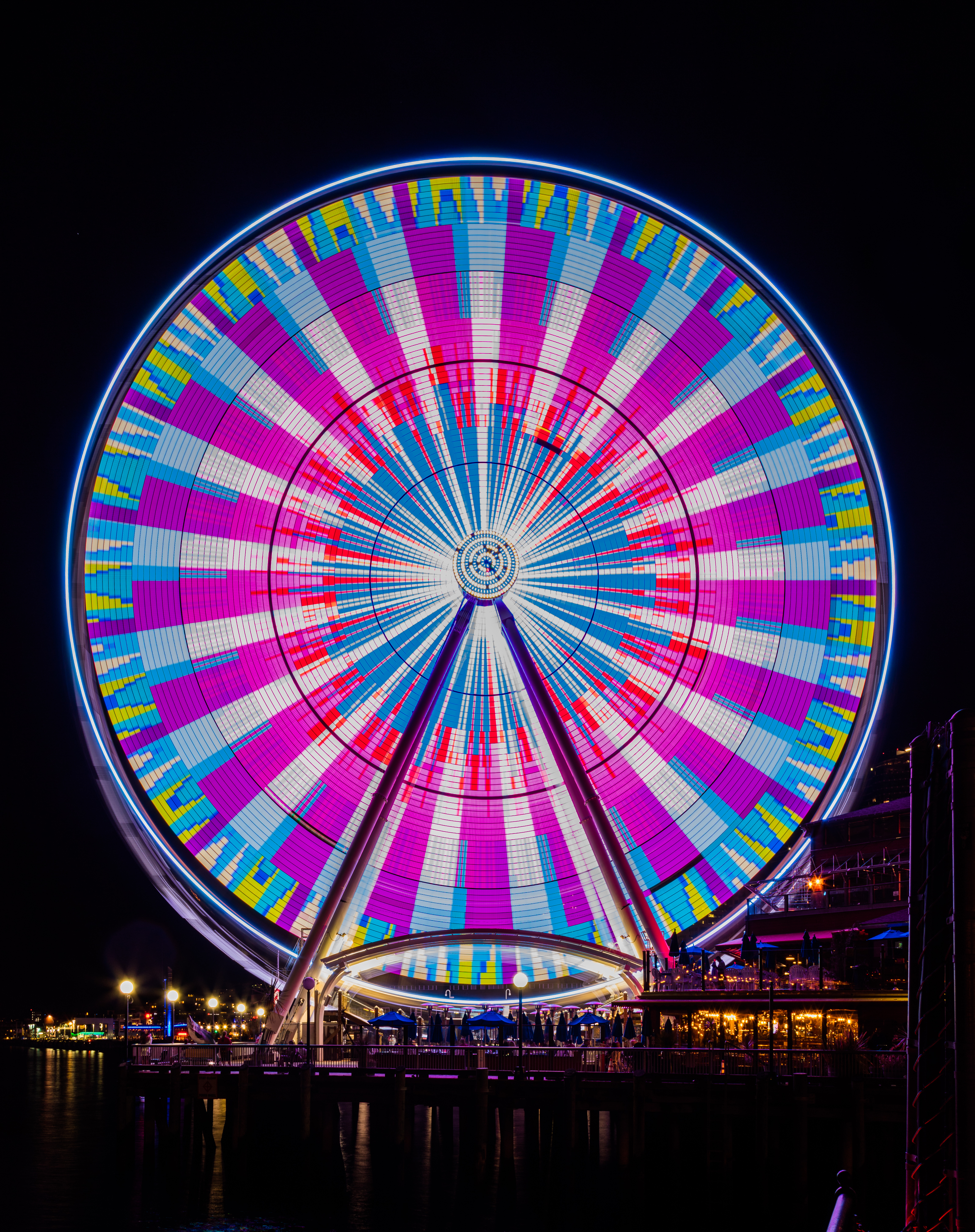
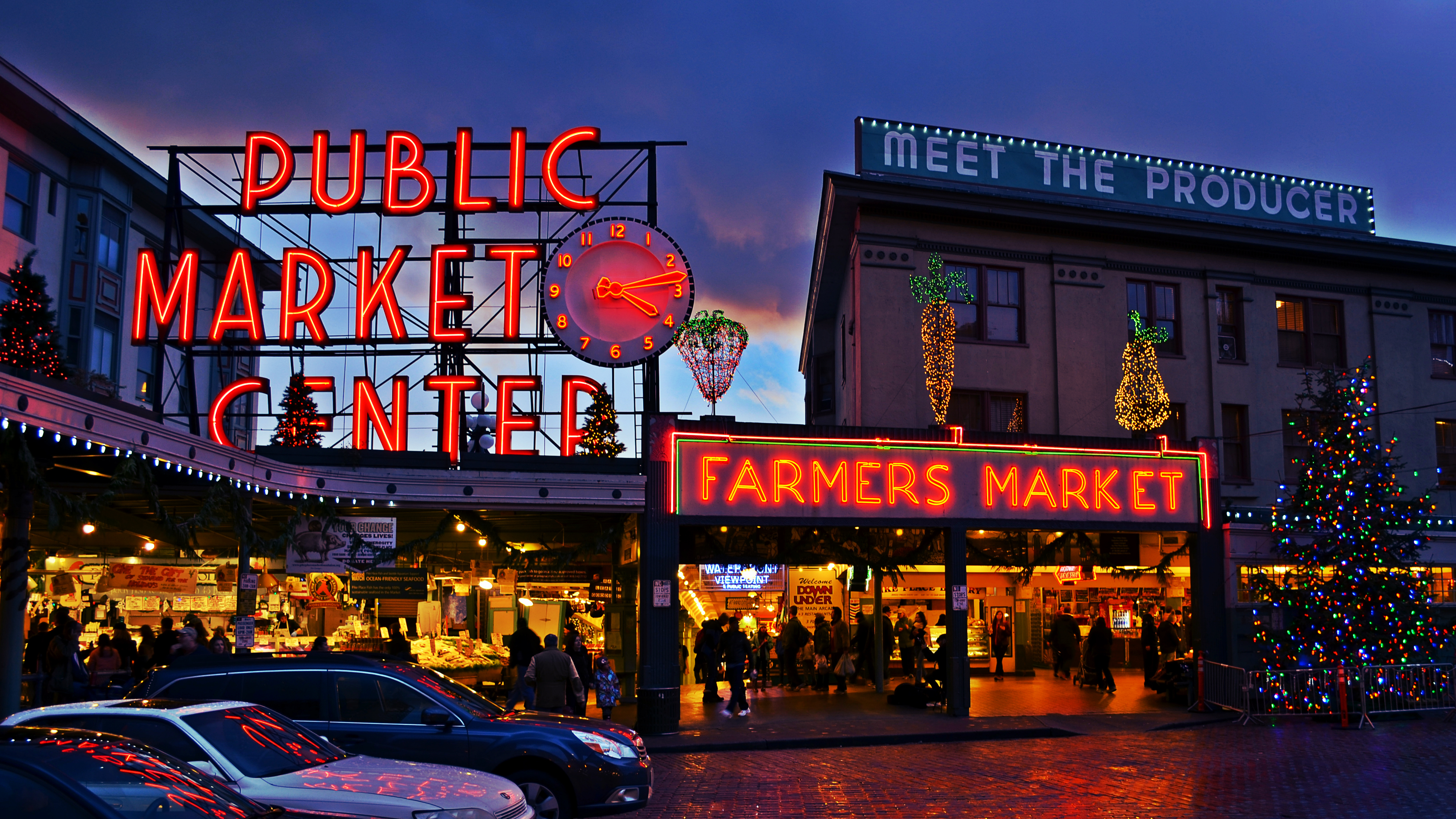
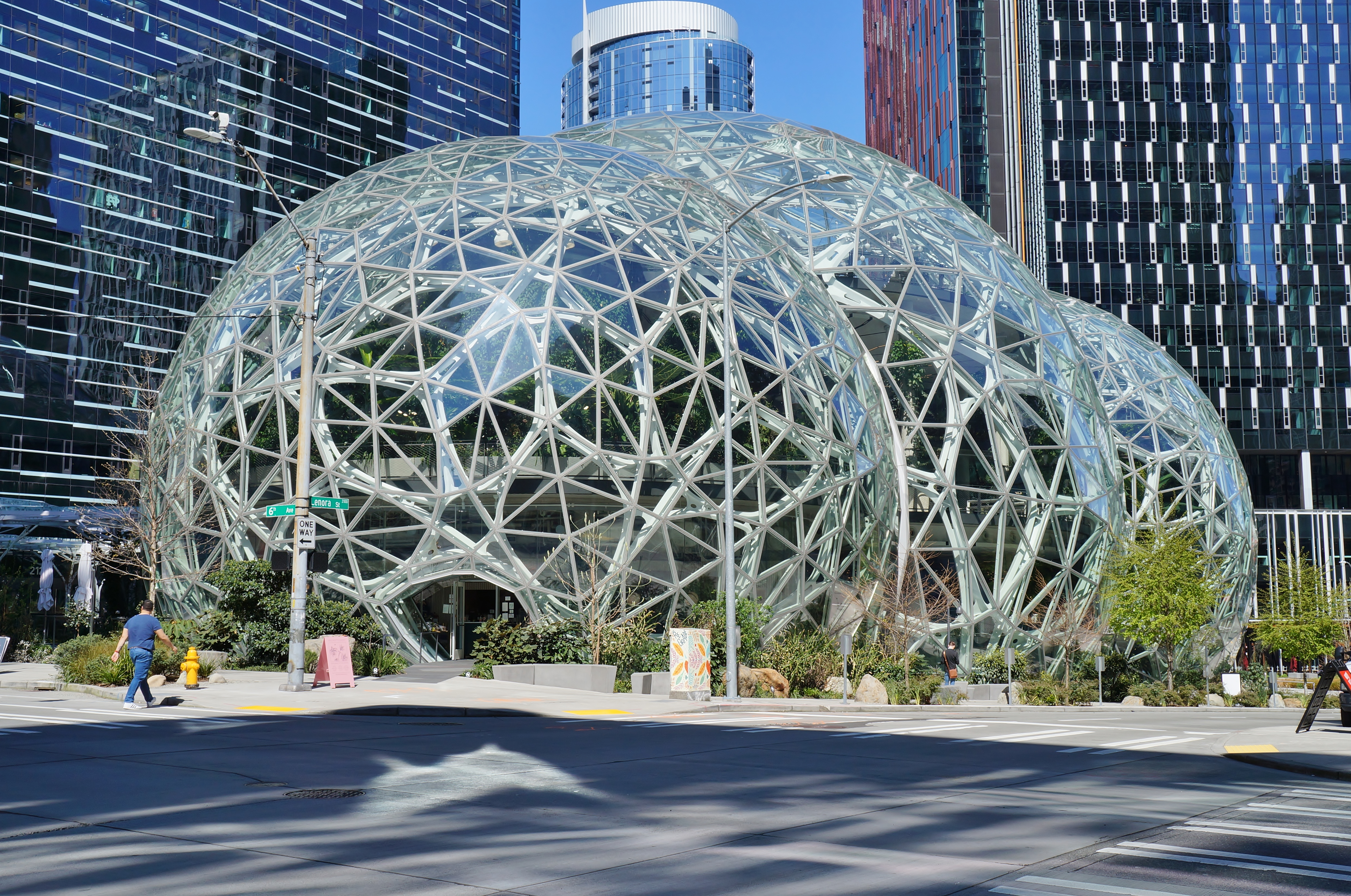
- Downtown Seattle skyline with Mount Rainier in the background Space Needle and Climate Pledge Arena, with the Olympic Mountains in the background Seattle Great Wheel Pike Place Market Amazon Spheres

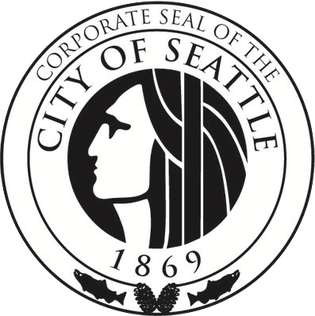
- Flag Seal Wordmark
- Nicknames: The Emerald City, Jet City, Rain City
- Mottoes: The City of Flowers, The City of Goodwill
- Interactive map of Seattle
- Location within Washington (state) Location within the United States
- Coordinates: 47°36′14″N 122°19′48″W
- Country: United States
- State: Washington
- County: King
- Founded: November 13, 1851 (Note: November 13, 1851, is often referred to as the unofficial date of Seattle's founding, when much of the Denny Party arrived at Alki Point. However, the first White settlers to inhabit the area had already arrived in September, which included some scouts of the Denny clan. The modern city did not take shape until the following spring after much of the party abandoned Alki to move across the bay. The name "Seattle" didn't become official until May 23, 1853.)
- Incorporated (town status): January 14, 1865
- Incorporated (city status): December 2, 1869
- Named for: Chief Seattle

Government
  - Type: Mayor–council
  - Body: Seattle City Council
  - Mayor: Katie Wilson (D)

Area
  - City: 142.07 sq mi (367.97 km^{2})
  - Land: 83.99 sq mi (217.54 km^{2})
  - Water: 58.08 sq mi (150.43 km^{2})
  - Metro: 8,186 sq mi (21,202 km^{2})
- Elevation: 148 ft (45 m)

Population (2020)
  - City: 737,015
  - Estimate (2025): 784,777 ▲
  - Rank: 54th in North America; 18th in the United States; 1st in Washington
  - Density: 9,302.2/sq mi (3,591.59/km^{2})
  - Urban: 3,544,011 (US: 13th)
  - Urban density: 3,607/sq mi (1,392.7/km^{2})
  - Metro: 4,018,762 (US: 15th)
- Demonym: Seattleite or Seattlite

GDP
  - Metro: $604.065 billion (2024)
- Time zone: UTC−8 (PST)
  - Summer (DST): UTC−7 (PDT)
- ZIP Codes: ZIP Codes: 98101–98119, 98121–98122, 98124–98127, 98129, 98131, 98133–98134, 98136, 98138–98139, 98141, 98144–98146, 98148, 98154–98155, 98158, 98160–98161, 98164–98166, 98168, 98170, 98174–98175, 98177–98178, 98181, 98185, 98188, 98190–98191, 98194–98195, 98198–98199
- Area code: 206, 564
- FIPS code: 53-63000
- GNIS feature ID: 2411856
- Website: seattle.gov
- Symbols
- Motto: The City of Flowers; the City of Goodwill
- Song: "Seattle the Peerless City"
- Bird: Great blue heron
- Flower: Dahlia

Seattle (/siˈætəl/ see-AT-əl) is the most populous city in the U.S. state of Washington and the Pacific Northwest region of North America. It is the 18th-most populous city in the United States with a population of 784,777 in 2025, while the Seattle metropolitan area at over 4.15 million residents is the 15th-most populous metropolitan area in the nation. The city is the county seat of King County, the most populous county in Washington. Seattle's growth rate of 21.1% between 2010 and 2020 made it one of the country's fastest-growing large cities.

Seattle is situated on an isthmus between Puget Sound, an inlet of the Pacific Ocean, and Lake Washington. It is the northernmost major city in the United States, located about 100 miles (160 km) south of the Canadian border. A gateway for trade with the Asia-Pacific region, the Port of Seattle is the fourth-largest port in North America in terms of container handling as of 2021.

The Seattle area has been inhabited by Native Americans (such as the Duwamish, who had at least 17 villages around Elliott Bay) for at least 4,000 years before the arrival of the first permanent European settlers. Arthur A. Denny and his group of travelers, subsequently known as the Denny Party, arrived from Illinois via Portland, Oregon, on the schooner Exact at Alki Point on November 13, 1851. The settlement was moved to the eastern shore of Elliott Bay in 1852 and named "Seattle" in honor of Chief Seattle, a prominent 19th-century leader of the local Duwamish and Suquamish tribes. Seattle has relatively high populations of Native Americans as well as Americans with strong Asian, African, and European ancestry, and, as of 2015, has the fifth-highest percentage of residents who identify as LGBT among major metropolitan areas in the U.S. (4.8 percent).

Logging was Seattle's first major industry, but by the late 19th century the city had become a commercial and shipbuilding center as a gateway to Alaska during the Klondike Gold Rush. The city grew after World War II, partly due to the local company Boeing, which established Seattle as a center for its manufacturing of aircraft. Beginning in the 1980s, the Seattle area developed into a technology center; Microsoft established its headquarters in the region. Alaska Airlines is based at Seattle–Tacoma International Airport in nearby SeaTac. The rise of new software, biotechnology, and Internet companies led to an economic revival, which increased the city's population by almost 50,000 between 1990 and 2000.

The culture of Seattle is heavily defined by its significant musical history. Between 1918 and 1951, nearly 24 jazz nightclubs existed along Jackson Street, from the current Chinatown/International District to the Central District. The jazz scene nurtured the early careers of Ernestine Anderson, Ray Charles, Quincy Jones, and others. In the late 20th and early 21st centuries, the city was the origin of several rock artists and bands, including the Foo Fighters, Heart, and Jimi Hendrix, and the subgenre of grunge and its pioneering bands, including Alice in Chains, Nirvana, Pearl Jam, and Soundgarden.

== History ==
Archaeological excavations suggest that Native Americans have inhabited the Seattle area for at least 4,000 years. By the time the first European settlers arrived, the Duwamish people occupied at least 17 villages in the areas around Elliott Bay. The name for the modern city of Seattle in Lushootseed, dᶻidᶻəlal̓ič, meaning "little crossing-over place", comes from one of these villages, which was located at the present-day King Street Station.

In May 1792, George Vancouver was the first European to visit the Seattle area during his 1791–1795 expedition for the Royal Navy, which sought to chart the Pacific Northwest for the British.

=== 19th century ===
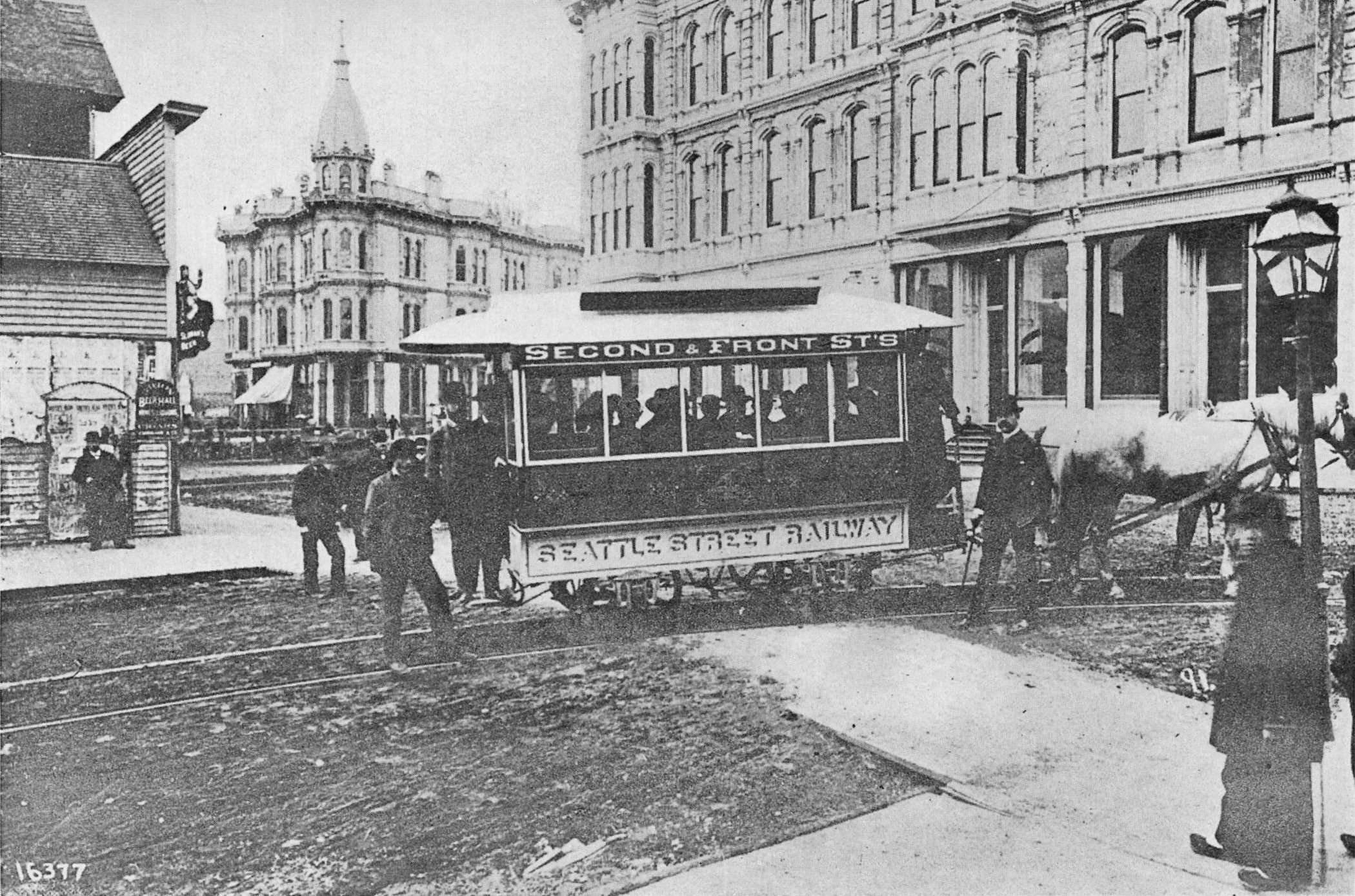
Seattle's first streetcar at the corner of Occidental and Yesler in 1884; all buildings depicted were destroyed by the Great Seattle Fire five years later, in 1889.

An 1891 aerial view of Seattle and surrounding King County

In 1851, a large party of American pioneers led by Luther Collins made a location on land at the mouth of the Duwamish River; they formally claimed it on September 14, 1851. Thirteen days later, members of the Collins Party on the way to their claim passed three scouts of the Denny Party. Members of the Denny Party claimed land on Alki Point on September 28, 1851. The rest of the Denny Party set sail on the schooner Exact from Portland, Oregon, stopping in Astoria, and landed at Alki Point during a rainstorm on November 13, 1851. After a difficult winter, most of the Denny Party relocated across Elliott Bay and claimed land a second time at the site of present-day Pioneer Square, naming this new settlement Duwamps.

Charles Terry and John Low remained at the original landing location, reestablished their old land claim and called it "New York", but renamed "New York Alki" in April 1853, from a Chinook word meaning, roughly, "by and by" or "someday". For the next few years, New York Alki and Duwamps competed for dominance, but in time Alki was abandoned and its residents moved across the bay to join the rest of the settlers.

David Swinson "Doc" Maynard, one of the founders of Duwamps, was the primary advocate to name the settlement after Chief Seattle (Lushootseed: siʔaɫ, anglicized as "Seattle"), chief of the Duwamish and Suquamish tribes. The brief Puget Sound War culminated in the Battle of Seattle on January 26, 1856. The attack was repelled, and the settlement was never attacked again.

The name "Seattle" appears on official Washington Territory papers dated May 23, 1853, when the first plats for the village were filed. In 1855, nominal land settlements were established. On January 14, 1865, the Legislature of Territorial Washington incorporated the Town of Seattle with a board of trustees managing the city. The Town of Seattle was disincorporated on January 18, 1867, and remained a mere precinct of King County until late 1869, when a new petition was filed and the city was re-incorporated December 2, 1869, with a mayor–council government. The corporate seal of the City of Seattle carries the date "1869" and a likeness of Chief Seattle in left profile. That same year, Seattle acquired the epithet of the "Queen City", a designation officially changed in 1982 to the "Emerald City".

Seattle has a history of boom-and-bust cycles, like many other cities near areas of extensive natural and mineral resources. Seattle has risen several times economically, then gone into precipitous decline, but it has typically used those periods to rebuild solid infrastructure.

The first such boom, covering the early years of the city, rode on the lumber industry. During this period the road now known as Yesler Way won the nickname "Skid Road", supposedly after the timber skidding down the hill to Henry Yesler's sawmill. The later dereliction of the area may be a possible origin for the term which later entered the wider American lexicon as Skid Row. Like much of the Western United States, Seattle experienced conflicts between labor and management and ethnic tensions that culminated in the anti-Chinese riots of 1885–1886. This violence originated with unemployed whites who were determined to drive the Chinese from Seattle; anti-Chinese riots also occurred in Tacoma.

Seattle had achieved sufficient economic success when the Great Seattle Fire of 1889 destroyed the central business district. However, a far grander city center rapidly emerged in its place. Finance company Washington Mutual, for example, was founded in the immediate wake of the fire. The Panic of 1893 hit Seattle hard.

The second and most dramatic boom resulted from the Klondike Gold Rush, which ended the depression that had begun with the Panic of 1893. In a short time, Seattle became a major transportation center. On July 14, 1897, the S.S. Portland docked with its famed "ton of gold", and Seattle became the main transport and supply point for the miners in Alaska and the Yukon. Few of those working men found lasting wealth. However, it was Seattle's business of clothing the miners and feeding them salmon that panned out in the long run. Along with Seattle, other cities like Everett, Tacoma, Port Townsend, Bremerton, and Olympia, all in the Puget Sound region, became competitors for exchange, rather than mother lodes for extraction, of precious metals.

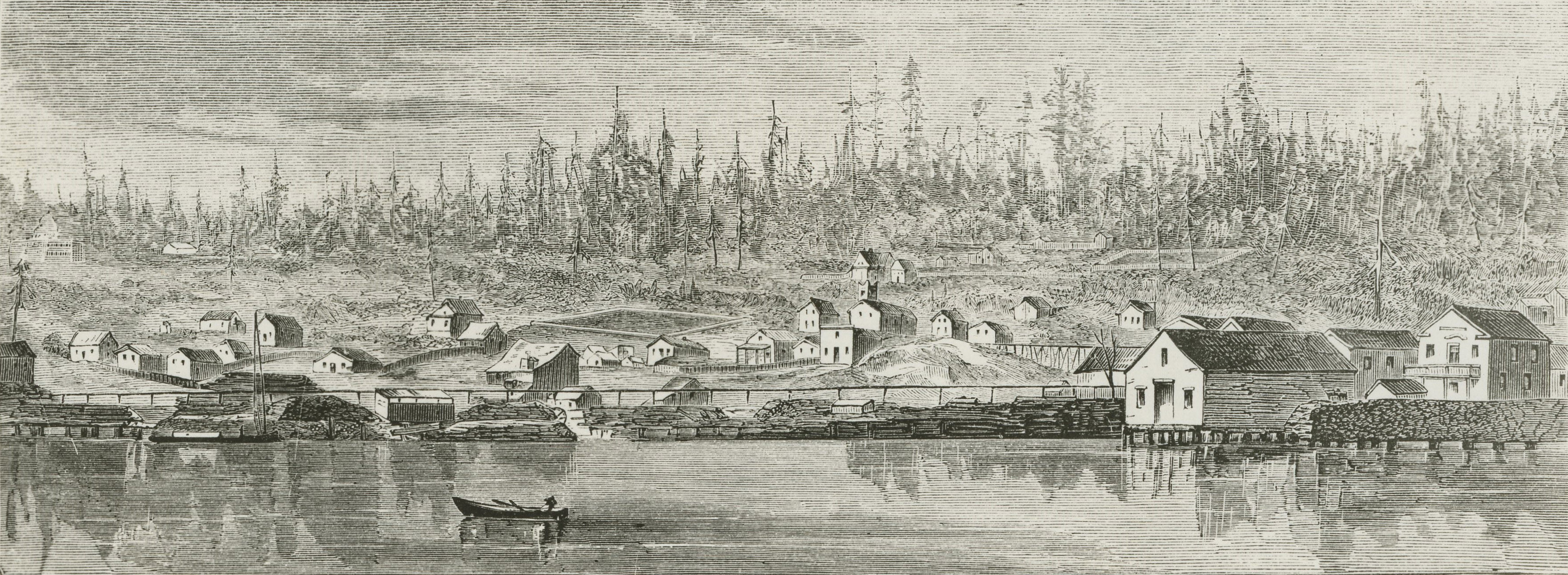
A September 1870 engraving of Seattle published in Harper's Magazine

=== 20th century ===
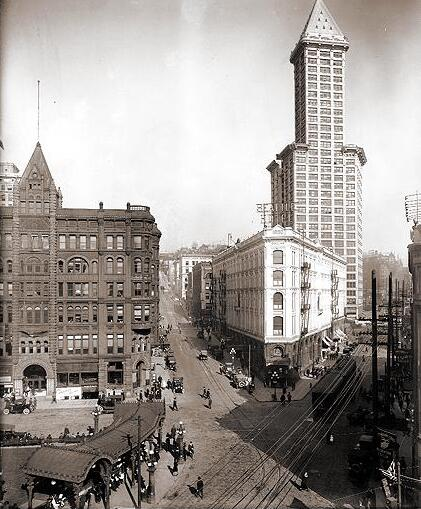
Pioneer Square, the Pioneer Building, the Smith Tower, and the Seattle Hotel in 1917

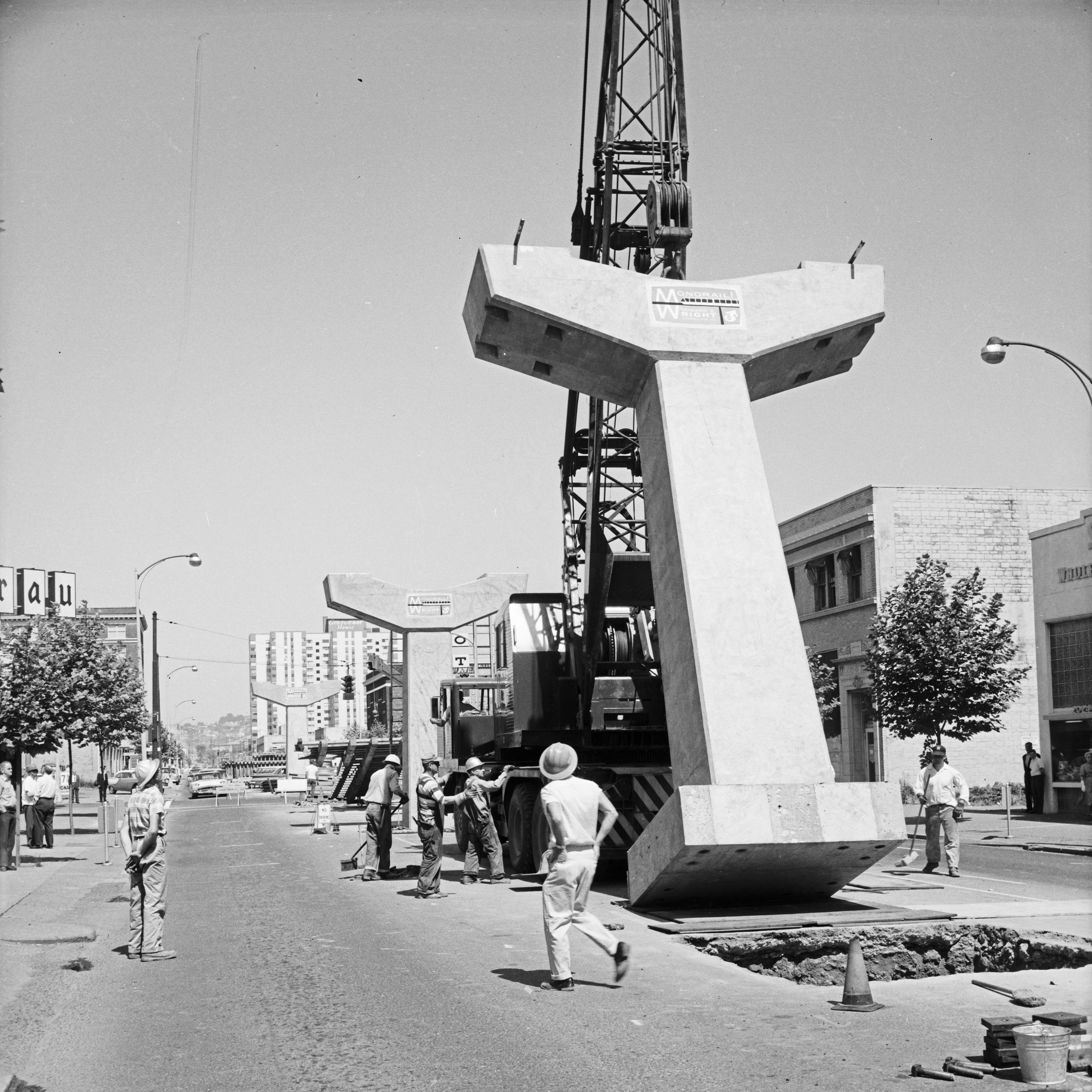
The Seattle Center Monorail under construction in 1961

The boom lasted into the early part of the 20th century, and funded many new Seattle companies and products. In 1907, 19-year-old James E. Casey borrowed $100 from a friend and founded the American Messenger Company (later UPS). Other Seattle companies founded during this period include Nordstrom and Eddie Bauer. Seattle brought in the Olmsted Brothers landscape architecture firm to design a system of parks and boulevards. The Gold Rush era culminated in the Alaska–Yukon–Pacific Exposition of 1909, which is largely responsible for the layout of today's University of Washington campus.

A shipbuilding boom in the early part of the 20th century became massive during World War I, making Seattle somewhat of a company town. The subsequent retrenchment led to the Seattle General Strike of 1919, an early general strike in the country. A 1912 city development plan by Virgil Bogue went largely unused. Seattle was mildly prosperous in the 1920s but was particularly hard hit in the Great Depression, experiencing some of the country's harshest labor strife in that era. Violence during the Maritime Strike of 1934 cost Seattle much of its maritime traffic, which was rerouted to the Port of Los Angeles.

Seattle was one of the major cities that benefited from programs such as the Works Progress Administration, CCC, Public Works Administration, and others. The workers, mostly men, built roads, parks, dams, schools, railroads, bridges, docks, and even historical and archival record sites and buildings. Seattle faced significant unemployment, loss of lumber and construction industries as Los Angeles prevailed as the bigger West Coast city. Seattle had building contracts that rivaled New York City and Chicago, but also lost to Los Angeles. Seattle's eastern farm land faded due to Oregon's and the Midwest's, forcing people into town.

Hooverville arose during the Depression, leading to Seattle's growing homeless population. Stationed outside Seattle, the Hooverville housed thousands of men but very few children and no women. With work projects close to the city, Hooverville grew and the WPA settled into the city.

A movement of women arose from Seattle during the Great Depression, fueled in part by Eleanor Roosevelt's 1933 book It's Up to the Women; women pushed for recognition, not just as housewives, but as the backbone of the family. Using newspapers and journals Working Woman and The Woman Today, women pushed to be seen as equal and receive some recognition.

The Great Depression did not impact the University of Washington negatively. As schools across Washington lost funding and attendance, the university actually prospered during the time period as they focused on growing their student enrollment. While Seattle public schools were influenced by Washington's superintendent Worth McClure, they still struggled to pay teachers and maintain attendance.

Seattle was the home base of impresario Alexander Pantages who, starting in 1902, opened a number of theaters in the city exhibiting vaudeville acts and silent movies. He went on to become one of America's greatest theater and movie tycoons. Scottish-born architect B. Marcus Priteca designed several theaters for Pantages in Seattle, which were later demolished or converted to other uses. Seattle's surviving Paramount Theatre, on which he collaborated, was not a Pantages theater.

War work again brought local prosperity during World War II, centered on the production of Boeing aircraft. The war dispersed the city's numerous Japanese-American businessmen due to the Japanese American internment. After the World War II, however, the local economy dipped. It rose again with Boeing's growing dominance in the commercial airliner market. Seattle celebrated its restored prosperity and made a bid for world recognition with the Century 21 Exposition, the 1962 World's Fair, for which the Space Needle was built.

Another major local economic downturn was in the late 1960s and early 1970s, at a time when Boeing was heavily affected by the oil crises, loss of government contracts, and costs and delays associated with the Boeing 747. Many people left the area to look for work elsewhere, and two local real estate agents put up a billboard reading "Will the last person leaving Seattle – Turn out the lights."

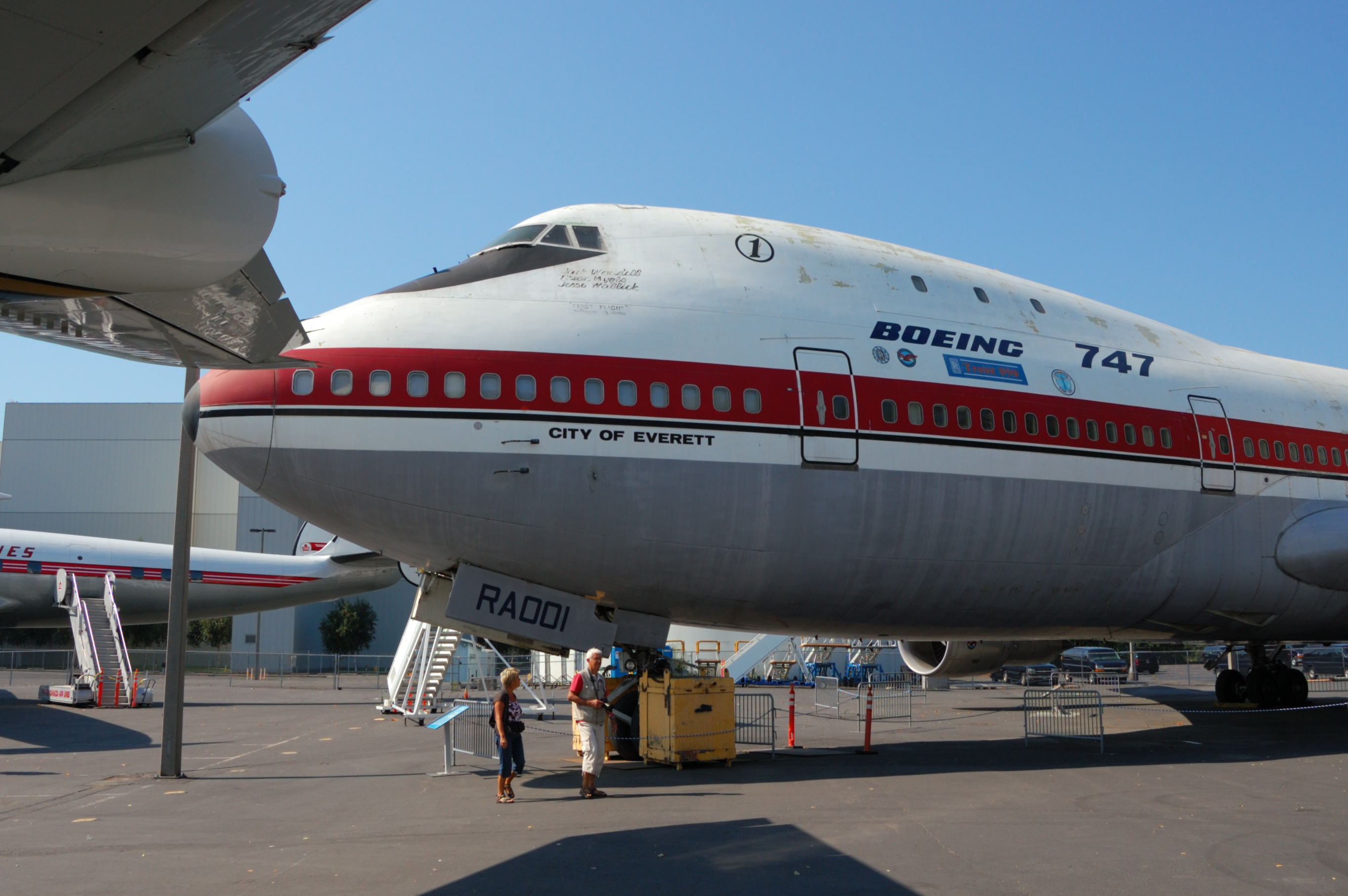
747 prototype "City of Everett" at Museum of Flight in Seattle.

Seattle remained the corporate headquarters of Boeing until 2001, when the company separated its headquarters from its major production facilities; the headquarters were moved to Chicago. The Seattle area is still home to Boeing's Renton narrow-body plant and Everett wide-body plant. The company's credit union for employees, BECU, remains based in the Seattle area and has been open to all residents of Washington since 2002.

On March 20, 1970, twenty-eight people were killed when the Ozark Hotel was burned by an unknown arsonist. The Wah Mee massacre in 1983 resulted in the killing of 13 people in an illegal gambling club in the Seattle Chinatown-International District.

The city's first coffeehouses were established in the late 1950s and grew over the following decades as espresso was introduced to the American market. On March 30, 1971, the first location for Starbucks Coffee opened at Pike Place Market in Downtown Seattle. The company initially sold coffee beans but later expanded into cafes.

Prosperity began to return in the 1980s beginning with Microsoft's 1979 move from Albuquerque, New Mexico, to nearby Bellevue, Washington.

Seattle and its suburbs became home to a number of technology companies, including Amazon, F5 Networks, RealNetworks, Nintendo of America, and T-Mobile. This success brought an influx of new residents with a population increase within city limits of almost 50,000 between 1990 and 2000, and saw Seattle's real estate become some of the most expensive in the country.

Seattle in this period attracted attention as home to the companies opened operations in or around the city. In 1990, the Goodwill Games were held in the city. Three years later, in 1993, the APEC leaders was hosted in Seattle. The 1990s also witnessed a growing popularity in grunge music, a sound that was largely developed in Seattle's independent music scene.

In 1993, the movie Sleepless in Seattle brought the city further national attention, as did the television sitcom Frasier. The dot-com boom caused a great frenzy among the technology companies in Seattle but the bubble ended in early 2001.

In 1999, the World Trade Organization held its conference in Seattle, which was met with protest activity. The protests and police reactions to them largely overshadowed the conference itself.

=== 21st century ===
In 2001, the city was impacted by the Mardi Gras Riots and then by the Nisqually earthquake the following day.

Another boom began as the city emerged from the Great Recession, commencing when Amazon moved its headquarters from North Beacon Hill to South Lake Union. The move initiated a historic construction boom which resulted in the completion of almost 10,000 apartments in Seattle in 2017, more than any previous year and nearly twice as many as were built in 2016. By 2025, Seattle's new apartments had become the smallest in the U.S., with an average of 649 square feet (60.3 m^{2}) among all unit types.

From 2010 to 2015, Seattle gained an average of 14,511 residents per year, with the growth strongly skewed toward the center of the city, and unemployment dropped from roughly 9 percent to 3.6 percent. The city has found itself "bursting at the seams", with over 45,000 households spending more than half their income on housing and at least 2,800 people homeless, and with the country's sixth-worst rush-hour traffic. In response, many urbanist measures to improve transit, cycling, and housing affordability were passed by city council, the state, and voters. These include Sound Transit 3, Seattle Prop 1A, a new "One Seattle" Comprehensive Plan, and electing Katie Wilson to mayor.

In 2020, protesters against the murder of George Floyd and police over-funding established a self-declared autonomous zone in the Capitol Hill neighborhood of Seattle.

During the early to mid 2020s, large numbers of transgender people fled to Seattle from conservative-leaning states, which had implemented hostile legislation restricting their civil rights. This led the city's LGBTQ commission to send a letter to the mayor recommending a state of civil emergency be declared.

== Geography ==
=== Topography ===
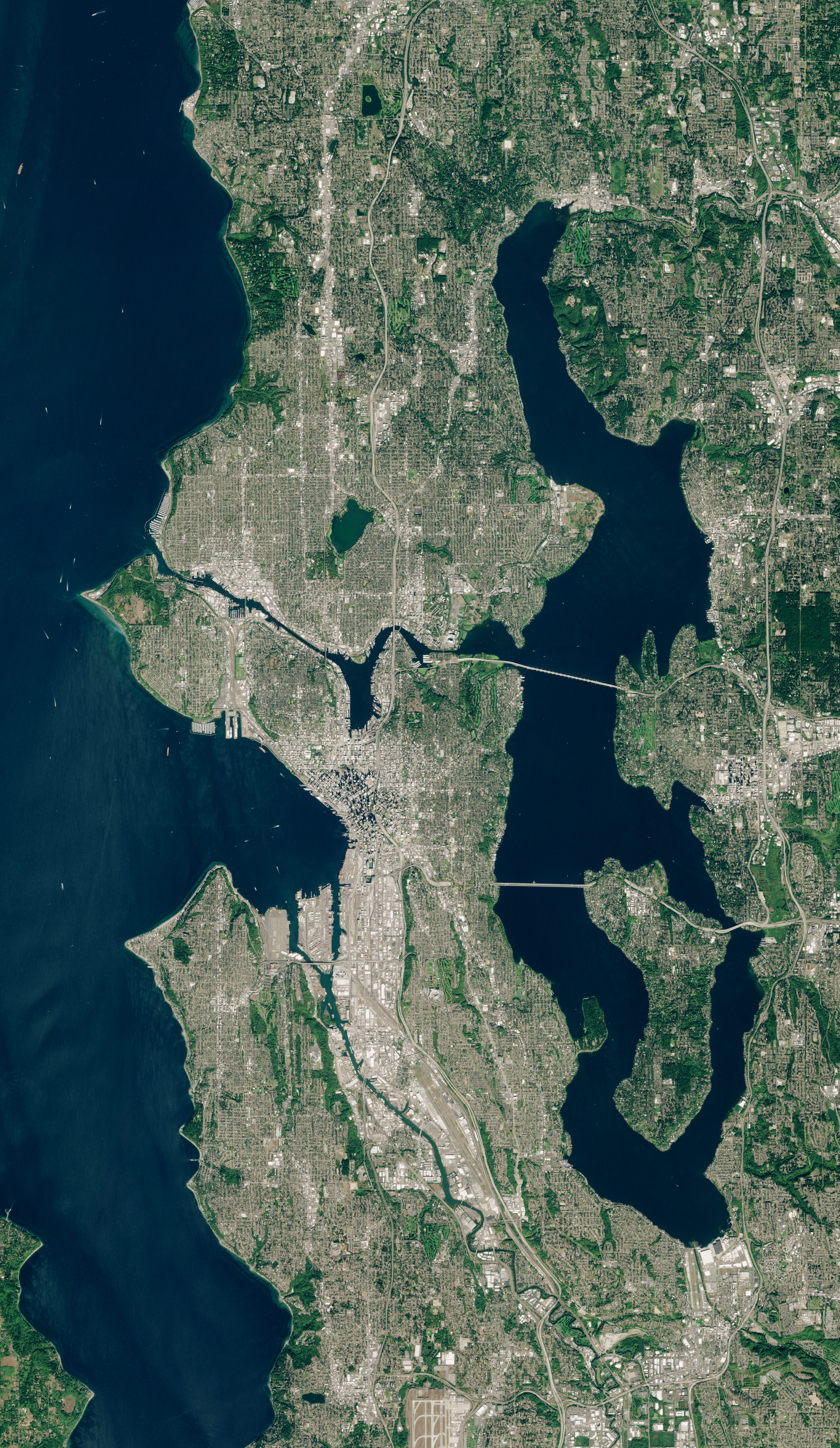
A satellite photo of Seattle in September 2018

Seattle is located between the saltwater Puget Sound (an arm of the Pacific Ocean) to the west and Lake Washington to the east. The city's chief harbor, Elliott Bay, is part of Puget Sound, making the city an oceanic port. To the west, beyond Puget Sound, are the Kitsap Peninsula and Olympic Mountains on the Olympic Peninsula; to the east, beyond Lake Washington and the Eastside suburbs, are Lake Sammamish and the Cascade Range. Lake Washington's waters flow to Puget Sound through the Lake Washington Ship Canal (consisting of two man-made canals, Lake Union, and the Hiram M. Chittenden Locks at Salmon Bay, ending in Shilshole Bay on Puget Sound).

The sea, rivers, forests, lakes, and fields surrounding Seattle were once rich enough to support one of the world's few sedentary hunter-gatherer societies. In modern times the surrounding area lends itself well to sailing, skiing, bicycling, camping, and hiking year-round.

The city is hilly in some places. Like Rome, the city is said to lie on seven hills; the lists vary but typically include Capitol Hill, First Hill, West Seattle, Beacon Hill, Queen Anne, Magnolia, and the former Denny Hill. The Wallingford, Delridge, Mount Baker, Seward Park, Washington Park, Broadmoor, Madrona, Phinney Ridge, Sunset Hill, Blue Ridge, Broadview, Laurelhurst, Hawthorne Hills, Maple Leaf, and Crown Hill neighborhoods are all located on hills. Many of the hilliest areas are near the city center, with Capitol Hill, First Hill, and Beacon Hill collectively constituting something of a ridge along an isthmus between Elliott Bay and Lake Washington. The break in the ridge between First Hill and Beacon Hill is man-made, a result of two of the many regrading projects that reshaped the topography of the city center. The topography of the city center was also changed by the construction of a seawall and the artificial Harbor Island (completed 1909) at the mouth of the city's industrial Duwamish Waterway, the terminus of the Green River. The highest point within city limits, 520 feet (160 m) above sea level, is at Myrtle Reservoir Park in the High Point neighborhood of West Seattle.

North of the city center, the Lake Washington Ship Canal connects Puget Sound to Lake Washington. It incorporates four natural bodies of water: Lake Union, Salmon Bay, Portage Bay, and Union Bay.

Due to its location in the Pacific Ring of Fire, Seattle is in a major earthquake zone. On February 28, 2001, the magnitude 6.8 Nisqually earthquake did significant architectural damage, especially in the Pioneer Square area (built on reclaimed land, as are the Industrial District and part of the city center), and caused one fatality. Other strong earthquakes occurred on January 26, 1700 (estimated at 9 magnitude), December 14, 1872 (7.3 or 7.4), April 13, 1949 (7.1), and April 29, 1965 (6.5). The 1965 quake caused three deaths in Seattle directly and one more by heart failure. Although the Seattle Fault passes just south of the city center, neither it nor the Cascadia subduction zone has caused an earthquake since the city's founding. The Cascadia subduction zone poses the threat of an earthquake of magnitude 9.0 or greater, capable of seriously damaging the city and collapsing many buildings, especially in zones built on fill.

According to the U.S. Census Bureau, the city has a total area of 142.5 square miles (369 km^{2}), 84 square miles (220 km^{2}) of which is land and 58.1 square miles (150 km^{2}) is water (41% of the total area).

=== Cityscape ===
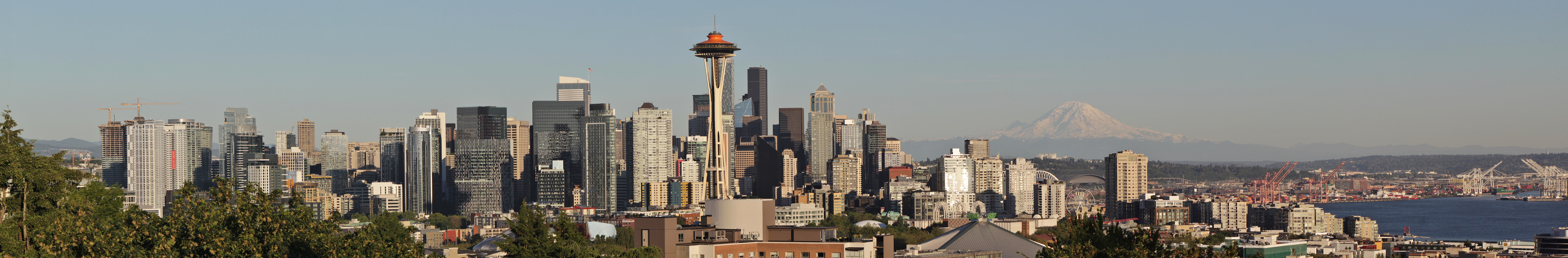
A Seattle skyline view from Queen Anne Hill, including the Space Needle, Climate Pledge Arena, Mount Rainier, Elliott Bay, and the Port of Seattle on Puget Sound

=== Climate ===
According to the Köppen climate classification system, Seattle has a warm-summer Mediterranean climate (Csb), while under the Trewartha system, it is labeled an oceanic climate (Dobk). It has cool, wet winters and mild, relatively dry summers, covering characteristics of both climate types. The climate is sometimes characterized as a "modified Mediterranean" climate because it is cooler and wetter than a "true" Mediterranean climate, but shares the characteristic dry summer (which has a strong influence on the region's vegetation).

Seattle's strong seasonal contrast reflects the migration of the dominant North Pacific pressure centers. In summer, the North Pacific High expands northward over the eastern Pacific and deflects the storm track far to the north of Washington. From late autumn through early spring the high retreats southward while the Aleutian Low, a semi-permanent low-pressure system near the Aleutian Islands, intensifies and shifts south, becoming one of the dominant features of Northern Hemisphere atmospheric circulation. Extratropical cyclones forming in the sub-polar North Pacific typically reach peak intensity near the Aleutian Low and are then steered by the polar jet stream toward the Pacific Northwest coast, delivering the great majority of Seattle's annual precipitation between October and March. Particularly intense storms include atmospheric rivers ("Pineapple Express" systems) that channel subtropical moisture into western Washington and can produce four to five inches of rainfall in twenty-four hours.

The city's precipitation is further shaped by its position in the lee of the Olympic Mountains, which rise abruptly to nearly 8,000 feet (2,400 m) only about 60 miles (97 km) to the west and force orographic uplift of incoming Pacific air. The windward Hoh Rainforest averages roughly 142 inches (3,600 mm) of precipitation annually, while the rain shadow on the leeward side produces only about 16 inches (410 mm) at Sequim in the Dungeness Valley, one of the steepest precipitation gradients in the contiguous United States. Seattle sits near the eastern edge of this shadow and is only partially sheltered by it.

Temperature extremes are moderated by the adjacent Puget Sound, greater Pacific Ocean, and Lake Washington. Thus extreme heat waves are rare in the Seattle area, as are very cold temperatures (below about 15 °F; −9 °C). The Seattle area is the cloudiest region of the Continental United States, with 201 cloudy days and 93 partly cloudy days in an average year. With many more "rain days" than other major American cities, Seattle has a well-earned reputation for frequent rain. In an average year, there are 150 days in which at least 0.01 inches (0.25 mm) of precipitation falls, more days than in nearly all U.S. cities east of the Rocky Mountains. However, because it often has merely a light drizzle falling from the sky for many days, Seattle actually receives significantly less rainfall (or other precipitation) overall than many other major U.S. cities like New York City, Miami, or Houston.

The most damaging weather events in the region are deep extratropical cyclones spawned along the Aleutian Low storm track, which periodically produce some of the strongest non-tropical windstorms in the contiguous United States. The benchmark event is the Columbus Day storm of 1962, which brought sustained winds above 100 miles per hour (160 km/h) to western Washington and killed 46 people across the region; the Hanukkah Eve Wind Storm of 2006 cut power to approximately 1.8 million customers and caused damages exceeding $1 billion.

Climate data for Seattle (SeaTac Airport), 1991–2020 normals, (Note: Mean monthly maxima and minima (i.e. the highest and lowest temperature readings during an entire month or year) calculated based on data at said location from 1991 to 2020.) extremes 1894–present (Note: Official records are restricted to SeaTac Airport from January 1945 onward.)
Month	Jan	Feb	Mar	Apr	May	Jun	Jul	Aug	Sep	Oct	Nov	Dec	Year
Record high °F (°C)	67 (19)	70 (21)	79 (26)	89 (32)	93 (34)	108 (42)	103 (39)	99 (37)	98 (37)	89 (32)	74 (23)	66 (19)	108 (42)
Mean maximum °F (°C)	57.0 (13.9)	59.1 (15.1)	66.4 (19.1)	74.3 (23.5)	81.9 (27.7)	85.8 (29.9)	91.2 (32.9)	89.9 (32.2)	84.1 (28.9)	72.0 (22.2)	61.6 (16.4)	56.8 (13.8)	94.1 (34.5)
Mean daily maximum °F (°C)	48.0 (8.9)	50.3 (10.2)	54.2 (12.3)	59.3 (15.2)	66.3 (19.1)	71.1 (21.7)	77.4 (25.2)	77.6 (25.3)	71.6 (22.0)	60.5 (15.8)	52.1 (11.2)	47.0 (8.3)	61.3 (16.3)
Daily mean °F (°C)	42.8 (6.0)	44.0 (6.7)	47.1 (8.4)	51.3 (10.7)	57.5 (14.2)	62.0 (16.7)	67.1 (19.5)	67.4 (19.7)	62.6 (17.0)	53.8 (12.1)	46.5 (8.1)	42.0 (5.6)	53.7 (12.1)
Mean daily minimum °F (°C)	37.7 (3.2)	37.7 (3.2)	39.9 (4.4)	43.3 (6.3)	48.7 (9.3)	53.0 (11.7)	56.8 (13.8)	57.2 (14.0)	53.6 (12.0)	47.0 (8.3)	40.9 (4.9)	37.1 (2.8)	46.1 (7.8)
Mean minimum °F (°C)	26.1 (−3.3)	27.3 (−2.6)	31.3 (−0.4)	35.6 (2.0)	40.6 (4.8)	46.6 (8.1)	51.5 (10.8)	51.7 (10.9)	45.8 (7.7)	36.8 (2.7)	29.2 (−1.6)	25.4 (−3.7)	21.5 (−5.8)
Record low °F (°C)	0 (−18)	1 (−17)	11 (−12)	29 (−2)	28 (−2)	38 (3)	43 (6)	44 (7)	35 (2)	28 (−2)	6 (−14)	6 (−14)	0 (−18)
Average precipitation inches (mm)	5.78 (147)	3.76 (96)	4.17 (106)	3.18 (81)	1.88 (48)	1.45 (37)	0.60 (15)	0.97 (25)	1.61 (41)	3.91 (99)	6.31 (160)	5.72 (145)	39.34 (999)
Average snowfall inches (cm)	1.8 (4.6)	2.2 (5.6)	0.4 (1.0)	0.0 (0.0)	0.0 (0.0)	0.0 (0.0)	0.0 (0.0)	0.0 (0.0)	0.0 (0.0)	0.0 (0.0)	0.2 (0.51)	1.7 (4.3)	6.3 (16)
Average precipitation days (≥ 0.01 in)	18.7	15.9	17.1	15.0	11.3	9.2	4.7	4.9	8.3	14.3	18.4	18.4	156.2
Average snowy days (≥ 0.1 in)	1.4	1.2	0.4	0.0	0.0	0.0	0.0	0.0	0.0	0.0	0.2	1.5	4.7
Average relative humidity (%)	78.0	75.2	73.6	71.4	68.9	67.1	65.4	68.2	73.2	78.6	79.8	80.1	73.3
Average dew point °F (°C)	33.1 (0.6)	35.1 (1.7)	36.3 (2.4)	38.8 (3.8)	43.5 (6.4)	48.2 (9.0)	51.4 (10.8)	52.7 (11.5)	50.2 (10.1)	45.1 (7.3)	38.8 (3.8)	34.3 (1.3)	42.3 (5.7)
Mean monthly sunshine hours	69.8	108.8	178.4	207.3	253.7	268.4	312.0	281.4	221.7	142.6	72.7	52.9	2,169.7
Percentage possible sunshine	25	38	48	51	54	56	65	64	59	42	26	20	49
Average ultraviolet index	0.8	1.5	2.8	4.5	6.0	6.9	7.3	6.2	4.4	2.3	1.1	0.7	3.7
Source 1: NOAA (relative humidity, dew point and sun 1961–1990)
Source 2: UV Index Today (1995 to 2022)

== Demographics ==
In the 2012–2016 American Community Survey (ACS), the racial makeup of the city was 65.7% White Non-Hispanic, 16.9% Asian, 6.8% Black or African American, 6.6% Hispanic or Latino of any race, 0.4% Native American, 0.9% Pacific Islander, 0.2% other races, and 5.6% two or more races.

Historical population
Census	Pop.	Note	%±
1860	188		—
1870	1,107		488.8%
1880	3,533		219.2%
1890	42,837		1,112.5%
1900	80,671		88.3%
1910	237,194		194.0%
1920	315,312		32.9%
1930	365,583		15.9%
1940	368,302		0.7%
1950	467,591		27.0%
1960	557,087		19.1%
1970	530,831		−4.7%
1980	493,846		−7.0%
1990	516,259		4.5%
2000	563,374		9.1%
2010	608,660		8.0%
2020	737,015		21.1%
2025 (est.)	784,777	▲	6.5%
U.S. Decennial Census; 2010–2020

Racial composition	2024	2020	2010	1990	1970	1950	1940
White (non-Hispanic)	56.9%	59.5%	66.3%	73.7%	85.3% (Note: From 15% sample)	94.2% (Note: Hispanic data not distinguished)	96.1%
Asian and Pacific Islander combined (non-Hispanic)	18.1%	17.2%	14.1%	11.8%	4.2%	1.8%	2.8%
Hispanic or Latino of any race	9.1%	8.2%	6.6%	3.6%	2.0%	n/a	n/a
Black or African American (non-Hispanic)	6.7%	6.8%	7.7%	10.1%	7.1%	3.4%	1.0%
Native American (non-Hispanic)	0.3%	0.4%	0.6%	1.4%	0.8%	0.1%	0.1%
Some Other Race (non-Hispanic)	0.5%	0.6%	0.2%	1.4%	0.5%	0.5%	n/a
Two or more races (non-Hispanic)	8.4%	7.3%	4.4%	n/a	n/a	n/a	n/a

Seattle's population historically has been predominantly white. The 2010 census showed that Seattle was one of the whitest big cities in the country, although its proportion of white residents has been gradually declining. In 1960, whites constituted 91.6% of the city's population, while in 2010 they constituted 69.5%. According to the 2006–2008 American Community Survey, approximately 78.9% of residents over the age of five spoke only English at home. Those who spoke Asian languages other than Indo-European languages made up 10.2% of the population, Spanish was spoken by 4.5% of the population, speakers of other Indo-European languages made up 3.9%, and speakers of other languages made up 2.5%.

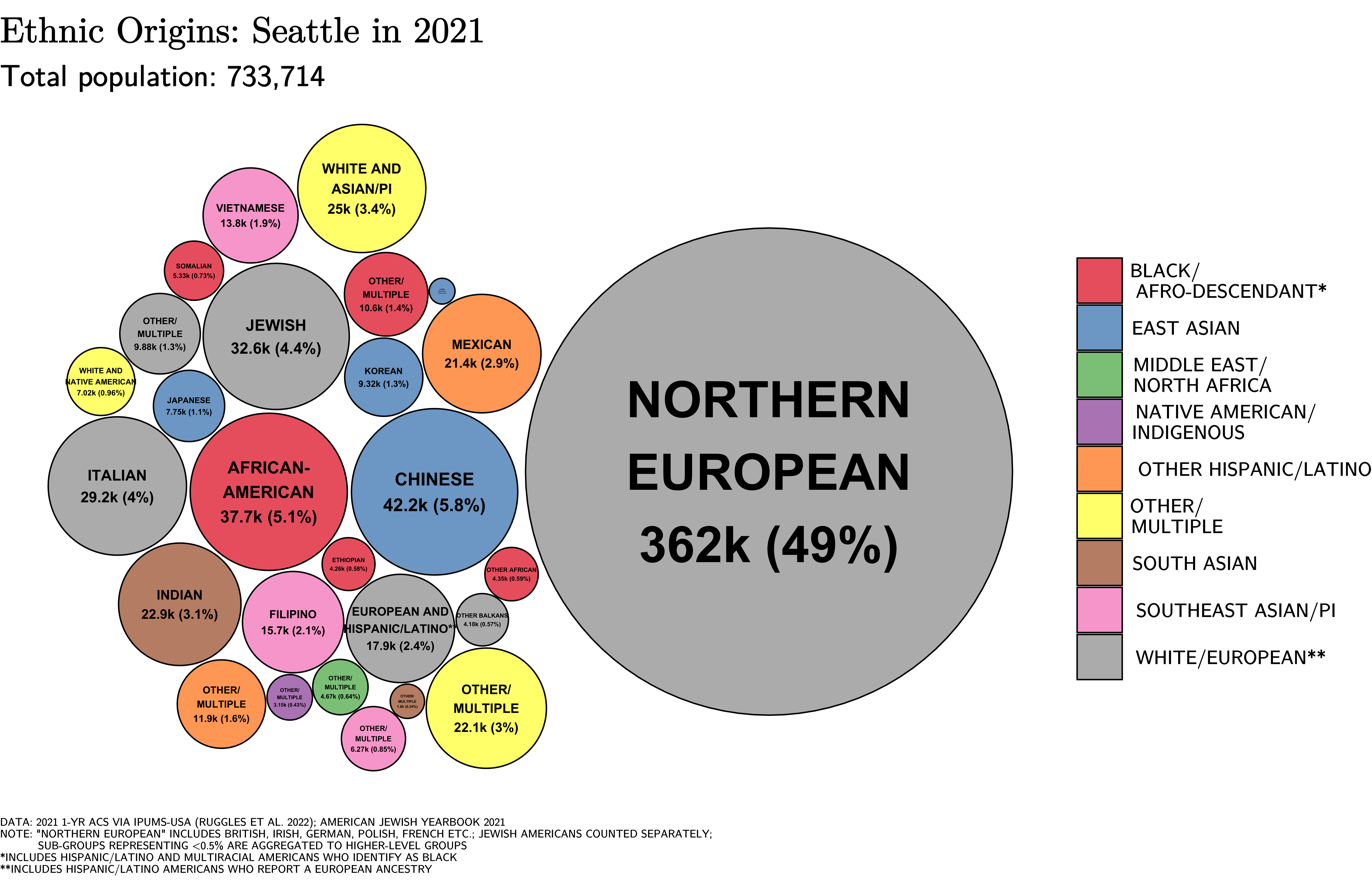
Ethnic origins in Seattle

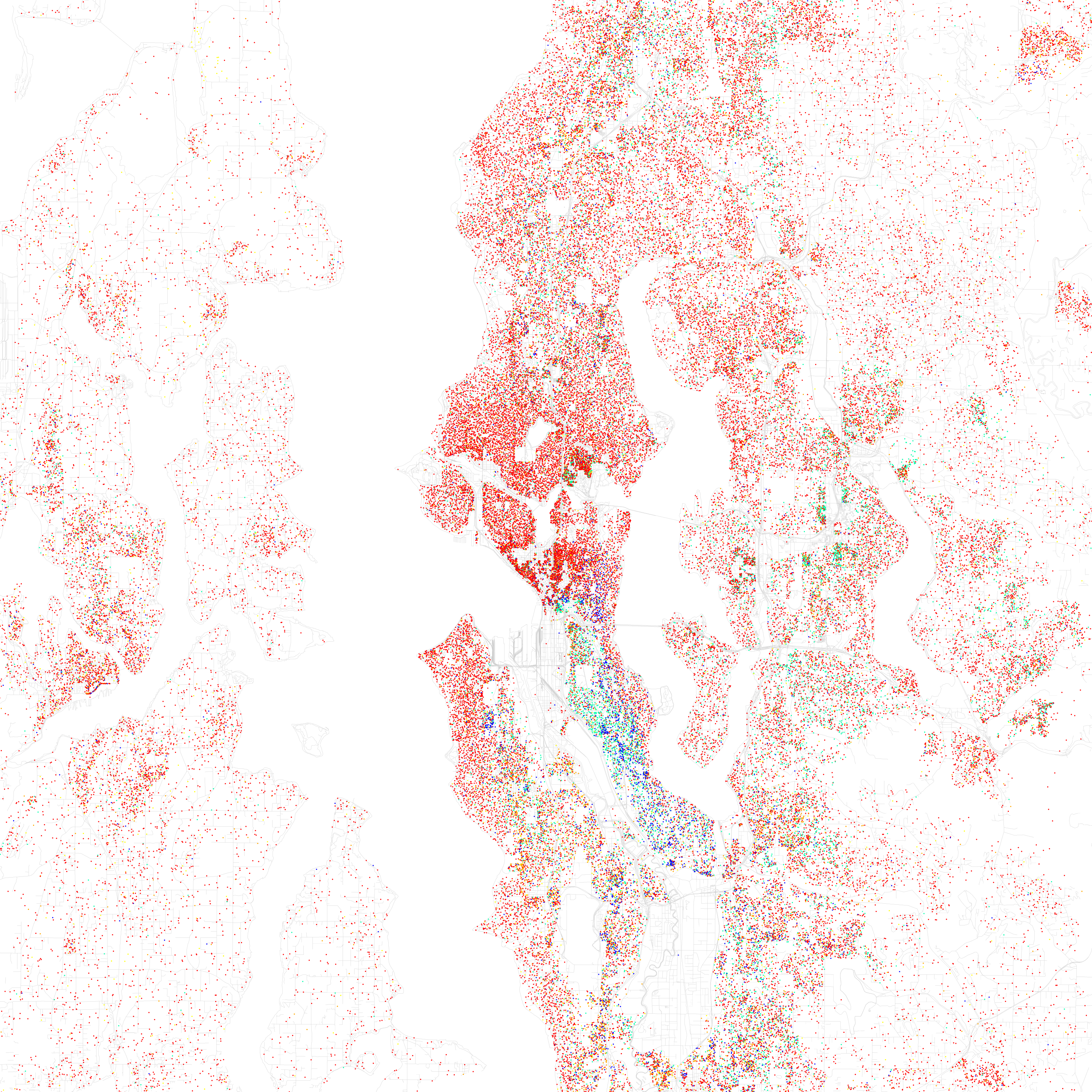
A racial distribution map of Seattle, 2010 U.S. Census. Each dot is 25 people: ⬤ White ⬤ Black ⬤ Asian ⬤ Hispanic ⬤ Other

Seattle's foreign-born population grew 40% between the 1990 and 2000 censuses. The Chinese population in the Seattle area has origins in mainland China, Hong Kong, Southeast Asia, and Taiwan. The earliest Chinese-Americans that came in the late 19th and early 20th centuries were almost entirely from Guangdong Province. In 2007, the Seattle area was also home to a large Vietnamese population of more than 55,000 residents. In 2013, there were over 30,000 Somali immigrants.

In 2004, the Seattle-Tacoma area was home to one of the largest Cambodian communities in the United States, numbering about 19,000 Cambodian Americans. In 2010, Seattle had one of the largest Samoan communities in the mainland U.S., with over 15,000 people having Samoan ancestry. In 2000, Seattle area had the highest percentage of self-identified mixed-race people of any large metropolitan area in the United States. In 2012, Seattle's 98118 ZIP code, in the Columbia City neighborhood, was one of the most diverse ZIP Code Tabulation Areas in the United States.

In 2018, the median income of a Seattle household was $93,481, and the median income for a family was $130,656. 11.0% of the population and 6.6% of families were below the poverty line. Of people living in poverty, 11.4% were under the age of 18 and 10.9% were 65 or older.

In 2007, King County had an estimated 8,000 homeless people on any given night, and many of those live in Seattle. In September 2005, King County adopted a "Ten-Year Plan to End Homelessness", one of the near-term results of which is a shift of funding from homeless shelter beds to permanent housing.

In recent years, the city has experienced steady population growth, and has been faced with the issue of accommodating more residents. In 2006, after growing by 4,000 citizens per year for the previous 16 years, regional planners expected the population of Seattle to grow by 200,000 people by 2040. Former mayor Greg Nickels supported plans that would increase the population by 60%, or 350,000 people, by 2040 and worked on ways to accommodate this growth while keeping Seattle's single-family housing zoning laws. The Seattle City Council later voted to relax height limits on buildings in the greater part of Downtown, partly with the aim to increase residential density in the city center. As a sign of increasing downtown core growth, the Downtown population crested to over 60,000 in 2009, up 77% since 1990.

In 2020, Seattle was one of the first US cities affected by COVID-19. At the same time, Seattle experienced its first population decline in 50 years. This was followed by five straight years of population growth that exceeded 2% per year. Seattle surpassed 800,000 residents in 2025.

Seattle has a relatively high number of adults living alone. In 2004, Seattle had the fifth highest proportion of single-person households nationwide among cities of 100,000 or more residents, at 40.8%.

=== Sexual orientation and gender identity ===
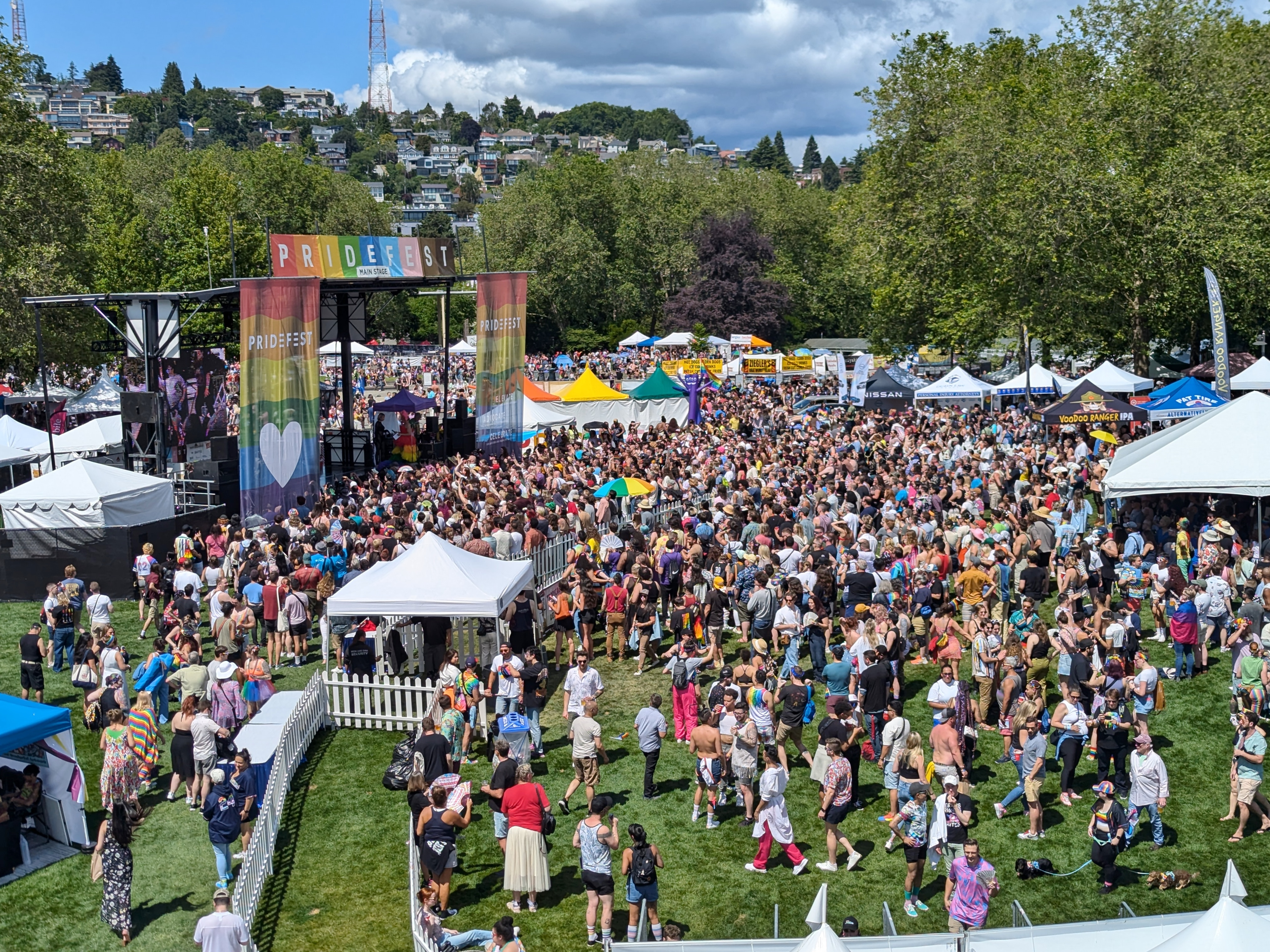
Seattle Pride Fest 2024

Seattle has a notably large lesbian, gay, bisexual, and transgender community. In 2006, 12.9% of city residents polled identified as gay, lesbian, or bisexual. This was the second-highest proportion of any major U.S. city, behind San Francisco. Greater Seattle also ranked second among major U.S. metropolitan areas, with 6.5% of the population identifying as gay, lesbian, or bisexual.

In 2015, Seattle ranked fifth, at 4.8%. In 2012, Seattle has the highest percentage of same-sex households in the United States, at 2.6 percent, surpassing San Francisco's 2.5 percent. The Capitol Hill district has been the center of LGBTQ culture in Seattle since the 1970s. Before then, the Pioneer Square district was the city's hub of LGBTQ community.

== Economy ==
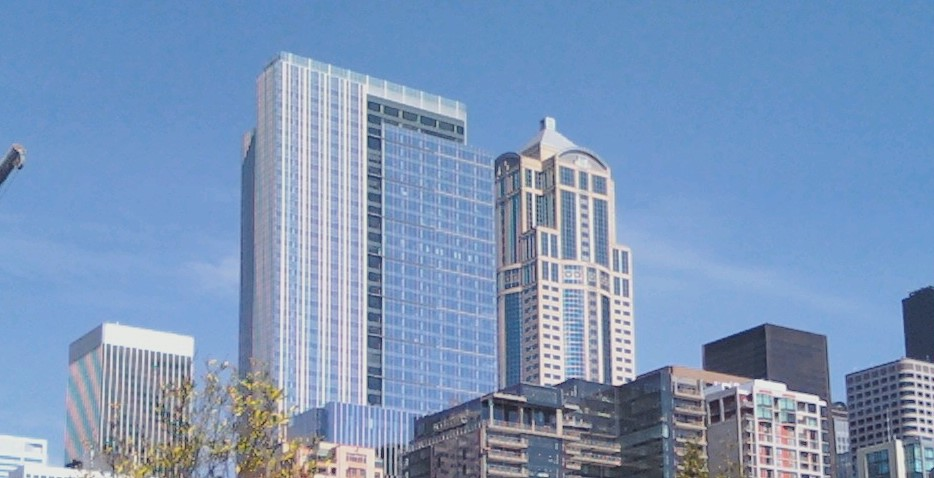
Washington Mutual's last headquarters, the WaMu Center, now the Russell Investments Center, (center left), and its prior headquarters, Washington Mutual Tower, now the 1201 Third Avenue Tower

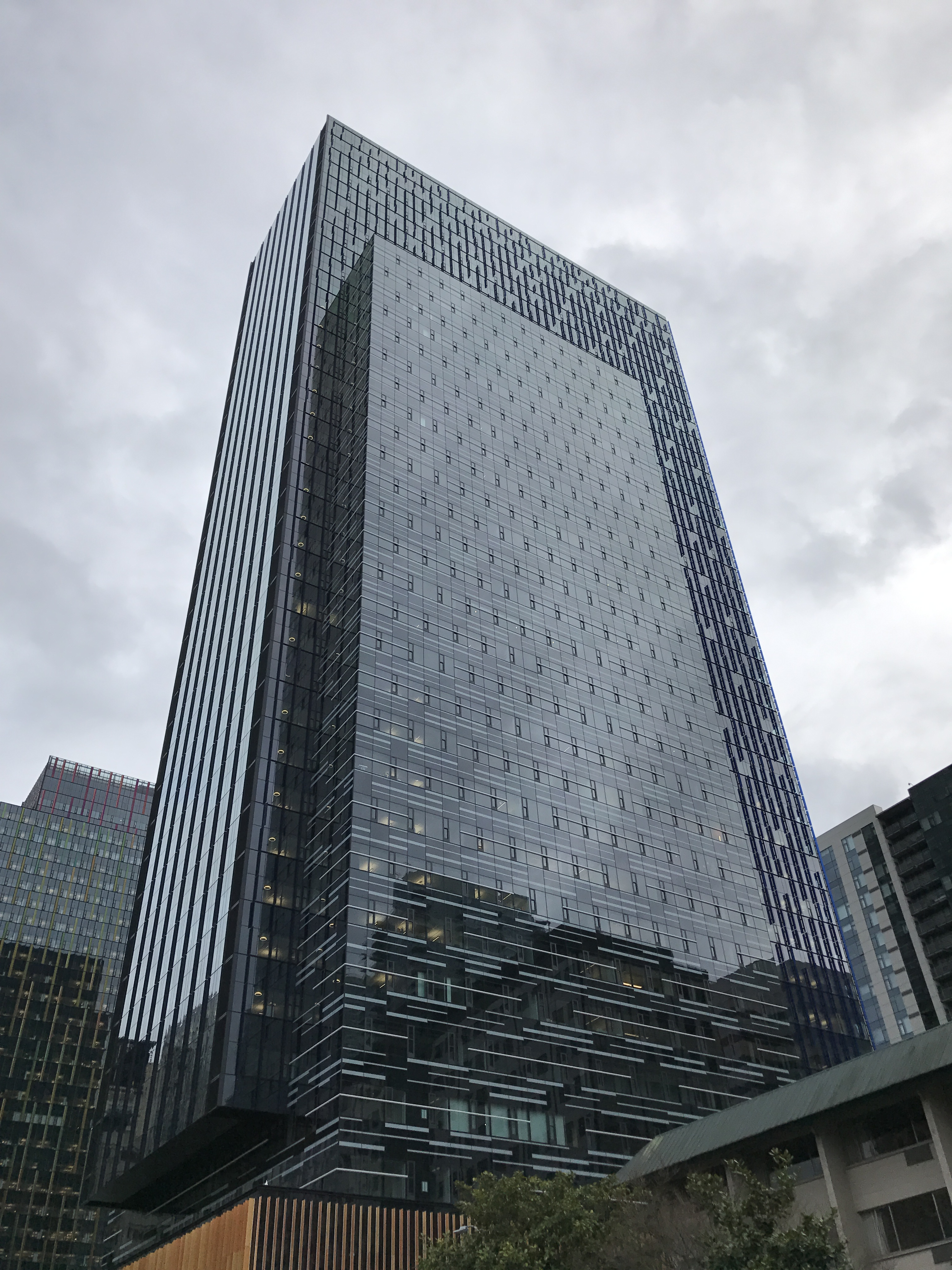
The corporate headquarters of online retailer Amazon, named Day 1 and located in Denny Triangle

Seattle's economy is driven by a mix of older industrial companies and new-economy internet and technology companies, as well as service, design, and clean technology companies. The city's gross metropolitan product (GMP) was $231 billion in 2010, making it the 11th-largest metropolitan economy in the United States. The Port of Seattle, which also operates Seattle–Tacoma International Airport, is a major gateway for trade with Asia and cruises to Alaska. It also is the 8th-largest port in the United States when measured by container capacity. Its maritime cargo operations merged with the Port of Tacoma in 2015 to form the Northwest Seaport Alliance.

Although it was impacted by the Great Recession, Seattle has retained a comparatively strong economy, and is noted for start-up businesses, especially in green building and clean technologies. In February 2010, the city government committed Seattle to become North America's first "climate neutral" city, with a goal of reaching net-zero per-capita greenhouse gas emissions by 2030.

Large companies continue to dominate the business landscape. Seven companies on Fortune 500's 2022 list of the United States' largest companies (based on total revenue) are headquartered in Seattle: Internet retailer Amazon (#2), coffee chain Starbucks (#120), freight forwarder Expeditors International of Washington (#225), department store Nordstrom (#245), forest products company Weyerhaeuser (#354), online travel company Expedia Group (#404), and real-estate tech company Zillow (#424) . Other Fortune 500 companies commonly associated with Seattle are based in nearby Puget Sound cities. Warehouse club chain Costco (#11), the largest retail company in Washington, is based in Issaquah. Microsoft (#14) is located in Redmond. Furthermore, Bellevue is home to truck manufacturer Paccar (#151). Other major companies headquartered in the area include Nintendo of America in Redmond, T-Mobile US in Bellevue, and Providence Health & Services (the state's largest health care system and fifth-largest employer) in Renton. The city has a reputation for heavy coffee consumption, with a landscape featuring Seattle-based companies such as Starbucks, Seattle's Best Coffee, and Tully's alongside numerous independent artisanal espresso roasters and cafés.

Before moving its headquarters to Chicago and then ultimately Arlington County, Virginia, aerospace manufacturer Boeing (#60) was the largest company based in Seattle. Its largest division, Boeing Commercial Airplanes, is still headquartered within the Puget Sound region. (Note: The division currently rotates its headquarters between sites within the region; the previous one in Renton was put up for sale in April 2021.) The company also has large aircraft manufacturing plants in Everett and Renton; it remains the largest private employer in the Seattle metropolitan area. In 2006 former Seattle Mayor Greg Nickels announced a desire to spark a new economic boom driven by the biotechnology industry. Major redevelopment of the South Lake Union neighborhood is underway in an effort to attract new and established biotech companies to the city, joining biotech companies Corixa (acquired by GlaxoSmithKline), Immunex (now part of Amgen), Trubion, and ZymoGenetics. Vulcan Inc., the holding company of billionaire Paul Allen, is behind most of the development projects in the region. While some see the new development as an economic boon, others have criticized Nickels and the Seattle City Council for pandering to Allen's interests at taxpayers' expense.

In response to advocacy concerning the rapidly increasing cost of living at the time, Seattle passed an ordinance in 2014 to gradually increase the minimum wage to $15 per hour by 2017 and increase it annually thereafter according to the metropolitan area's consumer price index (CPI). To address concerns from business proprietors, the ordinance included carveouts for small businesses and gratuity that were phased out at the end of 2024. Seattle and its metropolitan area currently have one of the highest minimum wages in the country at more than $20 per hour as of 2025.

Operating a hub at Seattle–Tacoma International Airport, Alaska Airlines maintains its headquarters in the city of SeaTac, next to the airport. Seattle is a hub for global health with the headquarters of the Bill & Melinda Gates Foundation, PATH (global health organization), Infectious Disease Research Institute, Fred Hutchinson Cancer Center, and the Institute for Health Metrics and Evaluation. In 2015, the Washington Global Health Alliance counted 168 global health organizations in Washington state. Many are headquartered in Seattle.

== Culture ==
Many of Seattle's neighborhoods host one or more street fairs or parades.

=== Performing arts ===
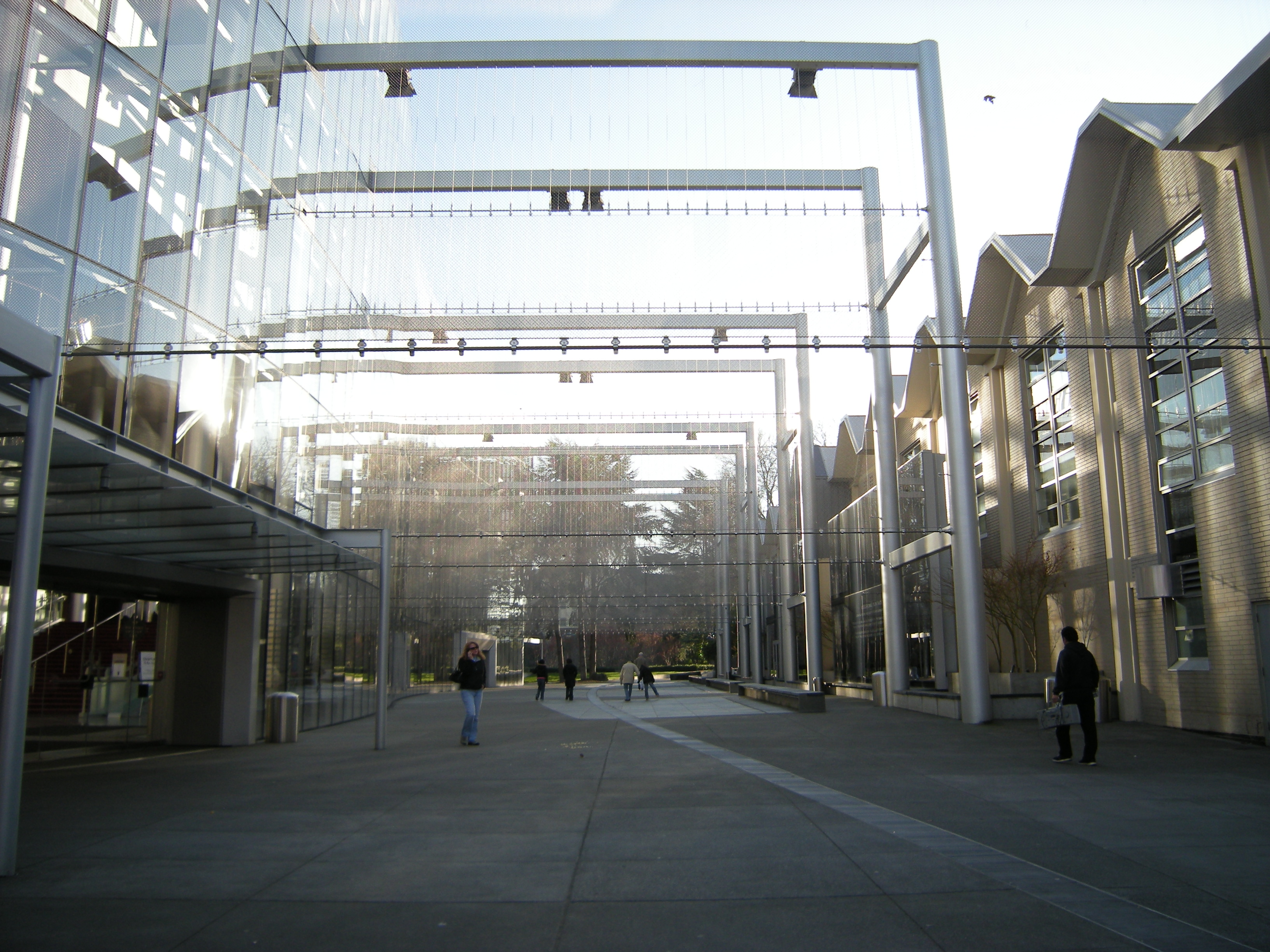
Kreielsheimer Promenade and Marion Oliver McCaw Hall at Seattle Center

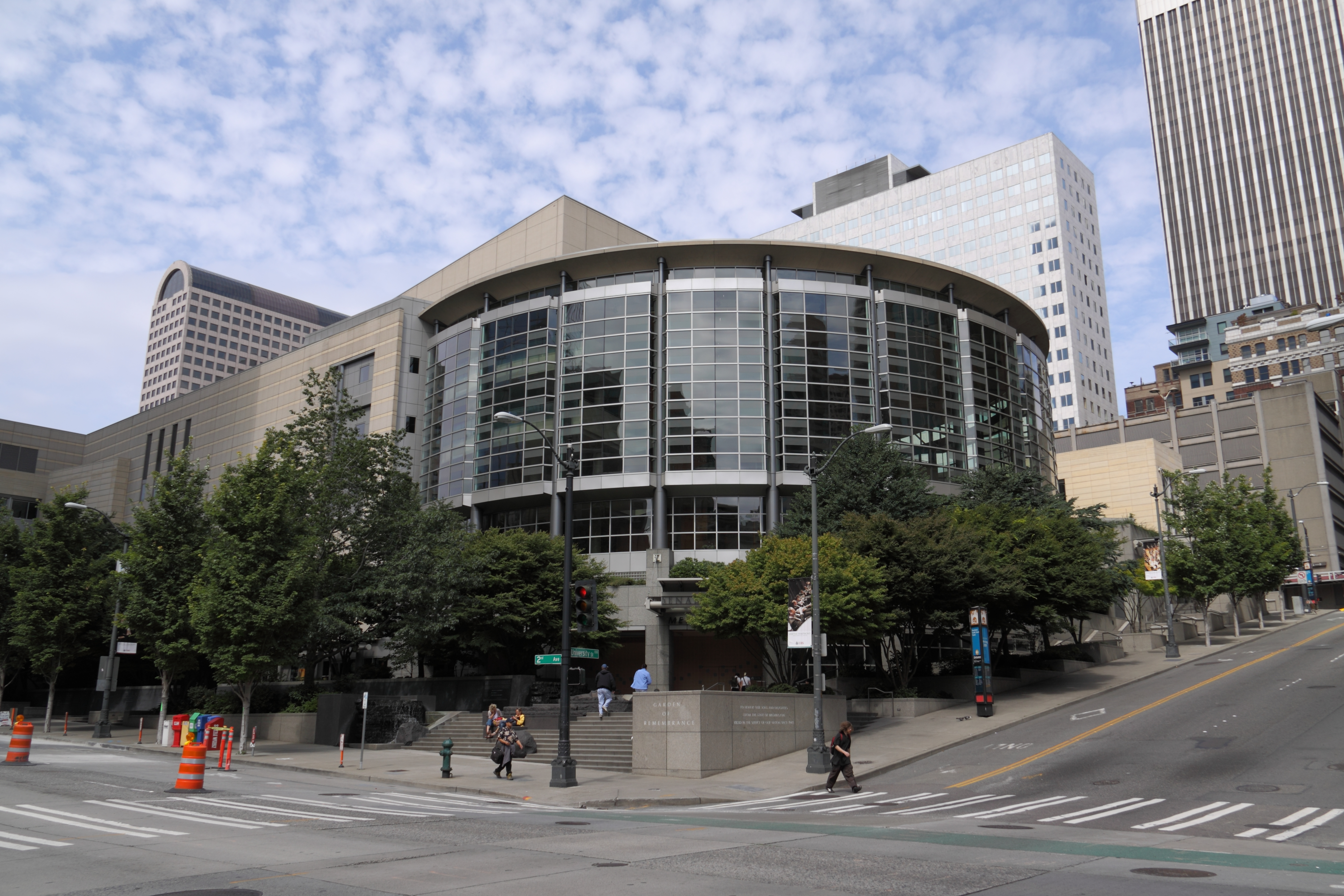
Benaroya Hall, home of the Seattle Symphony since 1998

Seattle has been a regional center for the performing arts for many years. The century-old Seattle Symphony Orchestra has won many awards and performs primarily at Benaroya Hall. The Seattle Opera and Pacific Northwest Ballet, which perform at McCaw Hall (opened in 2003 on the site of the former Seattle Opera House at Seattle Center), are comparably distinguished, with the Opera being particularly known for its performances of the works of Richard Wagner and the PNB School (founded in 1974), a ballet training institution. The Seattle Youth Symphony Orchestras (SYSO) is the largest symphonic youth organization in the United States. The city also boasts lauded summer and winter chamber music festivals organized by the Seattle Chamber Music Society.

The 5th Avenue Theatre, built in 1926, stages Broadway-style musical shows featuring both local talent and international stars. Seattle has "around 100" theatrical production companies and over two dozen live theatre venues, many of them associated with fringe theatre; Seattle is probably second only to New York for number of equity theaters (28 Seattle theater companies have some sort of Actors' Equity contract). In addition, the 900-seat Romanesque Revival Town Hall on First Hill hosts numerous cultural events, especially lectures and recitals.

Between 1918 and 1951, there were nearly two dozen jazz nightclubs along Jackson Street, running from the current Chinatown/International District to the Central District. The jazz scene developed the early careers of Ray Charles, Quincy Jones, Bumps Blackwell, Ernestine Anderson, and others.

Early popular musical acts from the Seattle/Puget Sound area include the collegiate folk group The Brothers Four, vocal group The Fleetwoods, 1960s garage rockers The Wailers and The Sonics, and instrumental surf group The Ventures, some of whom are still active.

Seattle is considered the home of grunge music, having produced artists such as Nirvana, Soundgarden, Alice in Chains, Pearl Jam, and Mudhoney, all of whom reached international audiences in the early 1990s. The city is also home to such varied artists as avant-garde jazz musicians Bill Frisell and Wayne Horvitz, hot jazz musician Glenn Crytzer, hip hop artists Sir Mix-a-Lot, Macklemore, Blue Scholars, and Shabazz Palaces, smooth jazz saxophonist Kenny G, classic rock staples Heart and Queensrÿche, and alternative rock bands such as Foo Fighters, Harvey Danger, The Presidents of the United States of America, The Posies, Modest Mouse, Band of Horses, Death Cab for Cutie, and Fleet Foxes. Rock musicians such as Jimi Hendrix, Duff McKagan, and Nikki Sixx spent their formative years in Seattle.

The Seattle-based Sub Pop record company continues to be one of the world's best-known independent/alternative music labels. Seattle is known for its live-music venues including The Crocodile, Vito's and Columbia City Theater. Over the years, a number of songs have been written about Seattle.

Seattle annually sends a team of spoken word slammers to the National Poetry Slam and considers itself home to such performance poets as Buddy Wakefield, two-time Individual World Poetry Slam Champ; Anis Mojgani, two-time National Poetry Slam Champ; and Danny Sherrard, 2007 National Poetry Slam Champ and 2008 Individual World Poetry Slam Champ. Seattle also hosted the 2001 national Poetry Slam Tournament. The Seattle Poetry Festival is a biennial poetry festival that (launched first as the Poetry Circus in 1997) has featured local, regional, national, and international names in poetry.

The city also has movie houses showing both Hollywood productions and works by independent filmmakers. Among these, the Seattle Cinerama stands out as one of only three movie theaters in the world still capable of showing three-panel Cinerama films.

=== Tourism ===
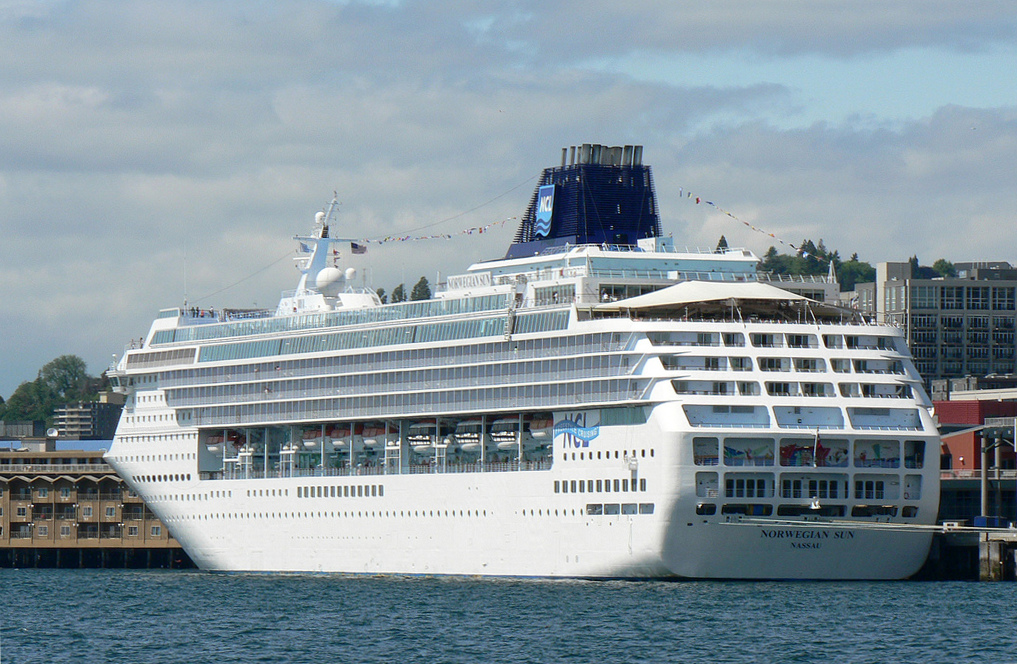
210 cruise ship visits brought 886,039 passengers to Seattle in 2008.

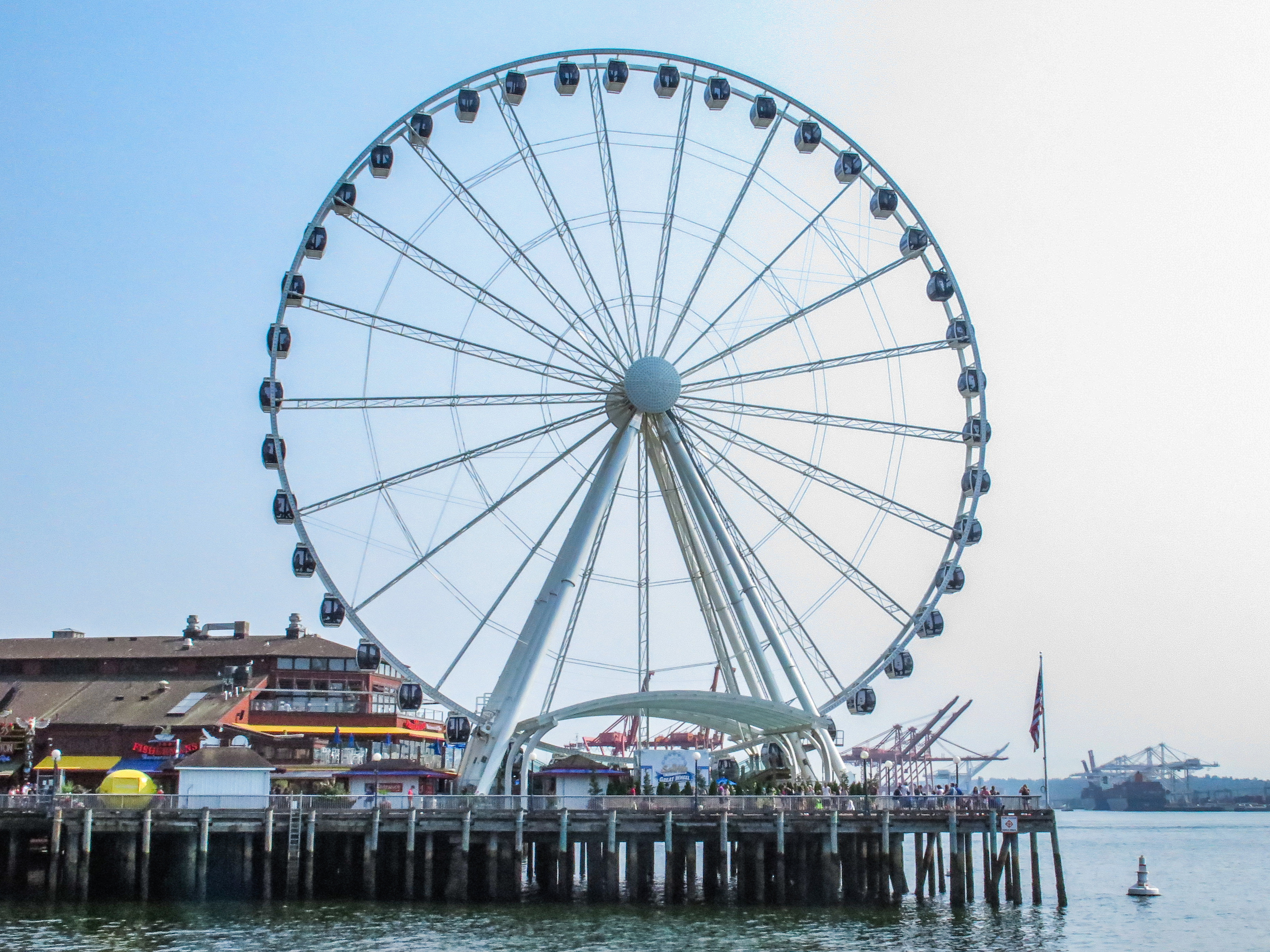
The Seattle Great Wheel

Among Seattle's prominent annual fairs and festivals are the 24-day Seattle International Film Festival, Northwest Folklife over the Memorial Day weekend, numerous Seafair events throughout July and August (ranging from a Bon Odori celebration to the Seafair Cup hydroplane races), the Bite of Seattle, one of the largest Gay Pride festivals in the United States, and the art and music festival Bumbershoot, which programs music as well as other art and entertainment over the Labor Day weekend. All are typically attended by 100,000 people annually, as are the Seattle Hempfest and two separate Independence Day celebrations.

Other significant events include numerous Native American pow-wows, a Greek Festival hosted by St. Demetrios Greek Orthodox Church in Montlake, and numerous ethnic festivals (many associated with Festál at Seattle Center).

There are other annual events, ranging from the Seattle Antiquarian Book Fair & Book Arts Show; an anime convention, Sakura-Con; Penny Arcade Expo, a gaming convention; a two-day, 9,000-rider Seattle to Portland Bicycle Classic; and specialized film festivals, such as the Maelstrom International Fantastic Film Festival, the Seattle Asian American Film Festival, Children's Film Festival Seattle, Translation: the Seattle Transgender Film Festival, the Seattle Queer Film Festival, Seattle Latino Film Festival, and the Seattle Polish Film Festival.

The Henry Art Gallery opened in 1927, the first public art museum in Washington. The Seattle Art Museum (SAM) opened in 1933 and moved to their current downtown location in 1991 (expanded and reopened in 2007); since 1991, the 1933 building has been SAM's Seattle Asian Art Museum (SAAM). SAM also operates the Olympic Sculpture Park (opened in 2007) on the waterfront north of the downtown piers. The Frye Art Museum is a free museum on First Hill.

Regional history collections are at the Log House Museum in Alki, Klondike Gold Rush National Historical Park, the Museum of History and Industry, and the Burke Museum of Natural History and Culture. Industry collections are at the Center for Wooden Boats and the adjacent Northwest Seaport, and the Museum of Flight. Regional ethnic collections include the National Nordic Museum, the Wing Luke Asian Museum, and the Northwest African American Museum. Seattle has artist-run galleries, including ten-year veteran Soil Art Gallery, and the newer Crawl Space Gallery.

The Seattle Great Wheel, one of the largest Ferris wheels in the US, opened in June 2012 as a new, permanent attraction on the city's waterfront, at Pier 57, next to Downtown Seattle. The Seattle Aquarium opened on the downtown waterfront in 1977 and was expanded in 2007 with an auditorium, gift shop, and cafe alongside new exhibit spaces. A new, three-story building under the Overlook Walk opened in 2024 with tropical exhibits and a 500,000-US-gallon (1,900,000 L) tank with sharks and rays from the Coral Triangle region of Southeast Asia.

Woodland Park Zoo opened as a private menagerie in 1889 but was sold to the city in 1899. The city also has many community centers for recreation, including Rainier Beach, Van Asselt, Rainier, and Jefferson south of the Ship Canal and Green Lake, Laurelhurst, Loyal Heights north of the Canal, and Meadowbrook. The Seattle Underground Tour is an exhibit of places that existed before the Great Fire and subsequent rebuilding of modern-day Pioneer Square, which raised the street level.

Since the mid-1990s, Seattle has experienced significant growth in the cruise industry, especially as a departure point for Alaska cruises. In 2023, a record total of 907,572 cruise passengers passed through the city, surpassing the number for Vancouver, BC, the other major departure point for Alaska cruises. New tourist industries, such as guided tours and amphibious tours also emerged during the 1990s.

=== Libraries ===
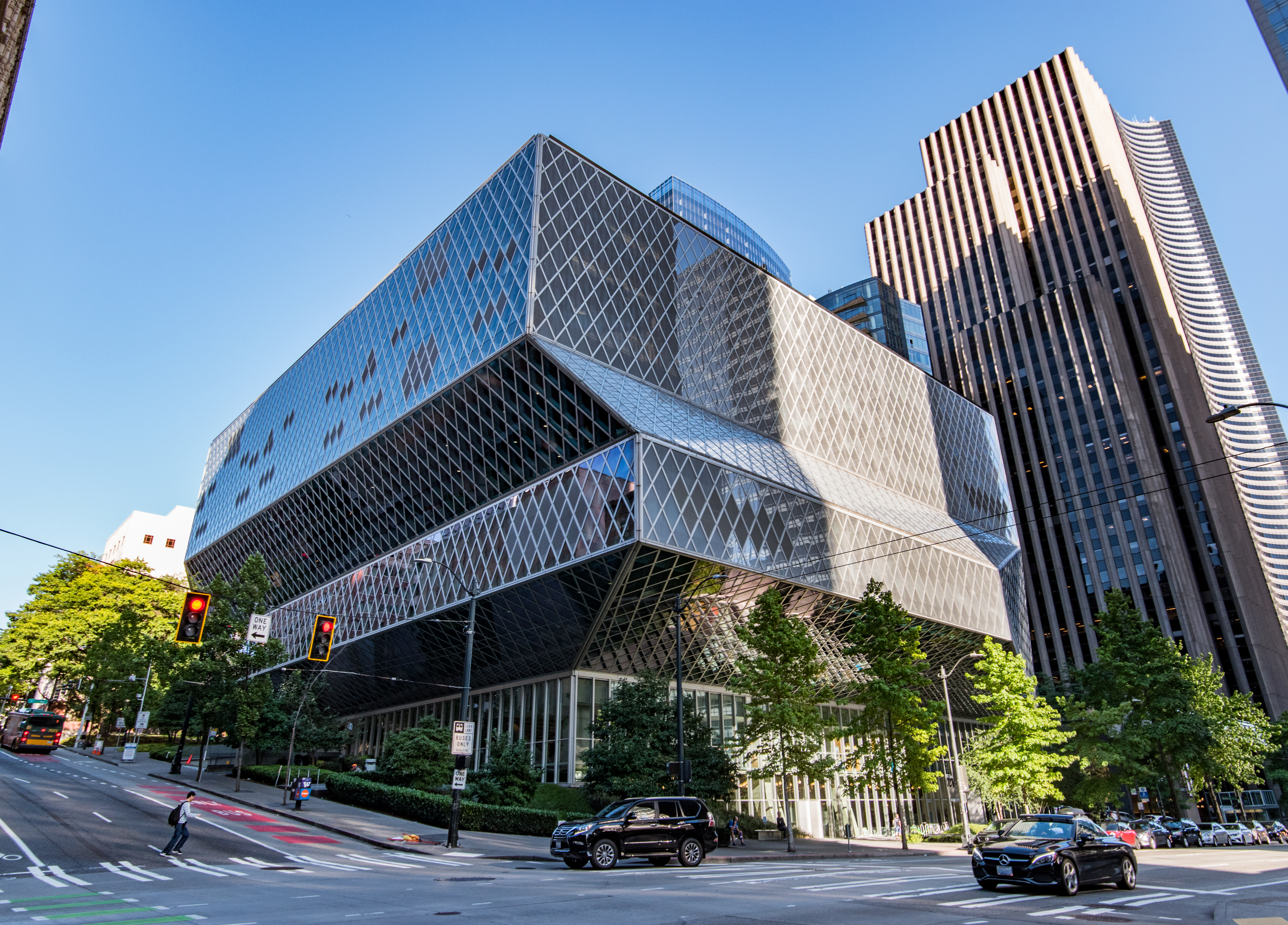
Seattle Central Library

The Seattle Public Library system consists of 27 branches with a combined total of 3,119,298 items as of 2023. The library was founded as part of the city government in 1890, though previous efforts to establish one date back to 1868; it first opened in 1891 and moved into a permanent location, a mansion once owned by Seattle pioneer Henry Yesler, in 1899. The mansion burned down in 1901 along with most of the 33,000 books then in the library's collection, resulting in the construction of a Carnegie library building in 1906; eventually known as the Seattle Central Library, the building was replaced in 1960 with an International Style design and again in 2004 with a design by Dutch architect Rem Koolhaas.

== Religion ==
A 2024 Household Pulse Survey from the United States Census Bureau estimated that 64 percent of adults in the Seattle area never attend religious services or attend less than once a year, the highest percentage among large U.S. metropolitan areas.

According to a 2024 study by the Pew Research Center, the largest religious groupings in the metropolitan area are Christians (44%) and those who identify with no religion (44%). They are followed by Buddhists (4%), Muslims (2%), Hindus (1%), Jews (1%), and a variety of other religions have smaller followings. According to the same study, about 32% of Seattleites are Protestant, and 11% are Roman Catholic. Meanwhile, 14% of the residents in Seattle call themselves agnostics, while 9% call themselves atheists.

Religious affiliation among Seattle-area adults (Pew Research Center)
Religious composition	2024	2014
Christian	44%	52%
—Evangelical Protestant	21%	23%
—Mainline Protestant	9%	10%
—Black Protestant	1%	1%
—Catholic	11%	15%
Non-Christian faiths	11%	10%
—Jewish	1%	1%
—Muslim	2%	< 1%
—Buddhist	4%	2%
—Hindu	1%	2%
Unaffiliated	44%	37%
—Atheist	9%	10%
—Agnostic	14%	6%
—Nothing in particular	21%	22%
Don't know	1%	1%

== Sports ==
Club	Sport	League	Venue (capacity)	Founded	Titles	Record attendance
Seattle Seahawks	American football	NFL	Lumen Field (69,000)	1976	2	69,005
Seattle Mariners	Baseball	MLB	T-Mobile Park (47,574)	1977	0	46,596
Seattle Kraken	Ice hockey	NHL	Climate Pledge Arena (17,100)	2021	0	17,151
Seattle Sounders FC	Soccer	MLS	Lumen Field (69,000)	2007^{[A]}	2	69,274
Seattle Seawolves	Rugby	MLR	Starfire Sports (4,500)	2017	2	4,500
Seattle Storm	Basketball	WNBA	Climate Pledge Arena (18,100)	2000	4	18,100
Seattle Reign FC	Soccer	NWSL	Lumen Field (69,000)	2013	0	42,054
Seattle Torrent	Ice hockey	PWHL	Climate Pledge Arena (17,100)	2025	0	16,014
Ballard FC Salmon Bay FC	Soccer	USL2 USL-W	Interbay Soccer Field (1,000)	2022 2025	1 0	3,146 —
West Seattle Junction FC West Seattle Rhodies FC	Soccer	USL2 USL-W	Nino Cantu Southwest Athletics Complex	2024 2025	0 0	—

Notes
^{A} Originally founded in 1974, the MLS version of the Sounders franchise was legally re-incorporated in 2007 and entered the league for the 2009 season.

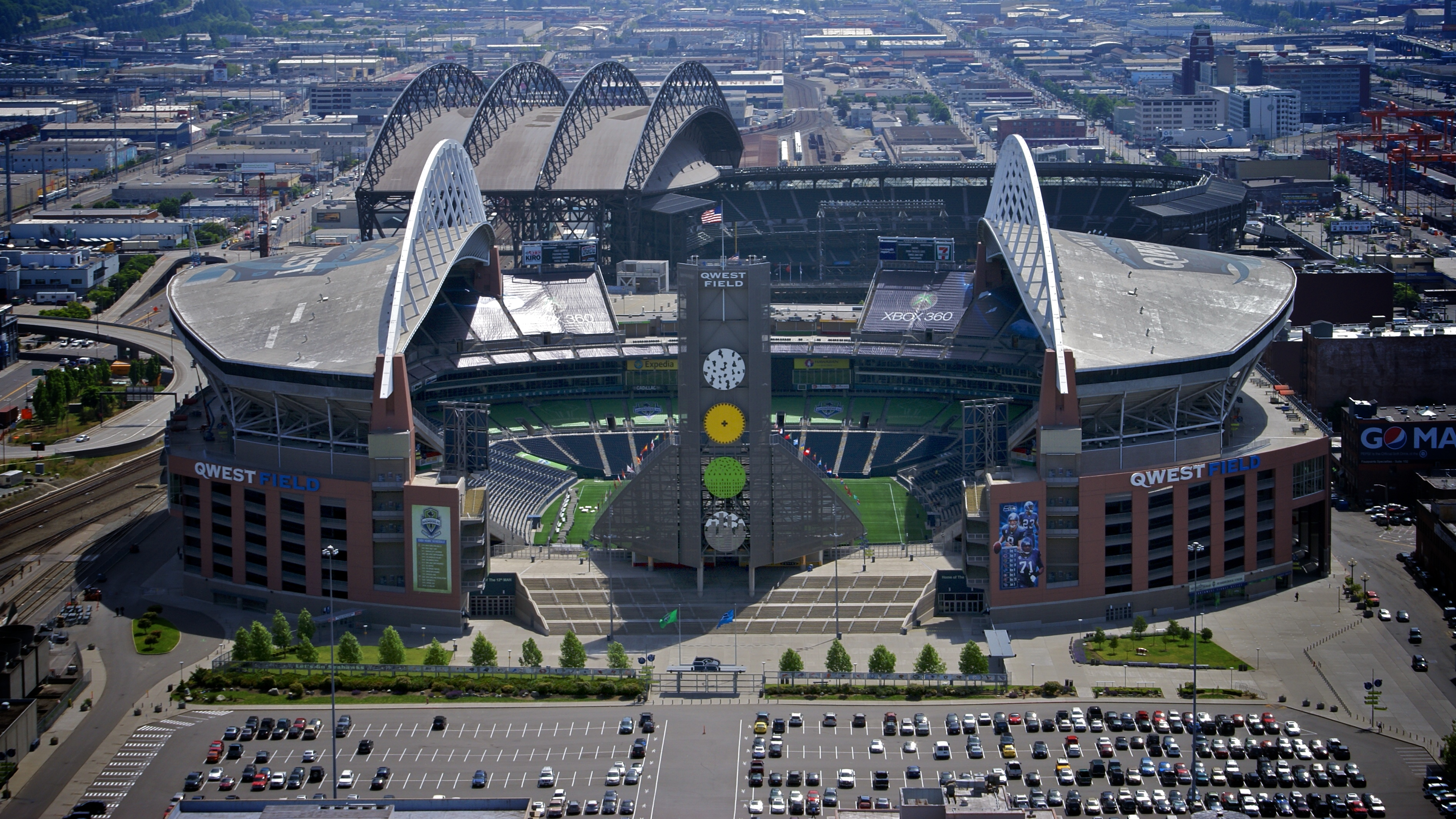
Lumen Field, home of the Seattle Seahawks, Seattle Sounders FC, and Seattle Reign FC

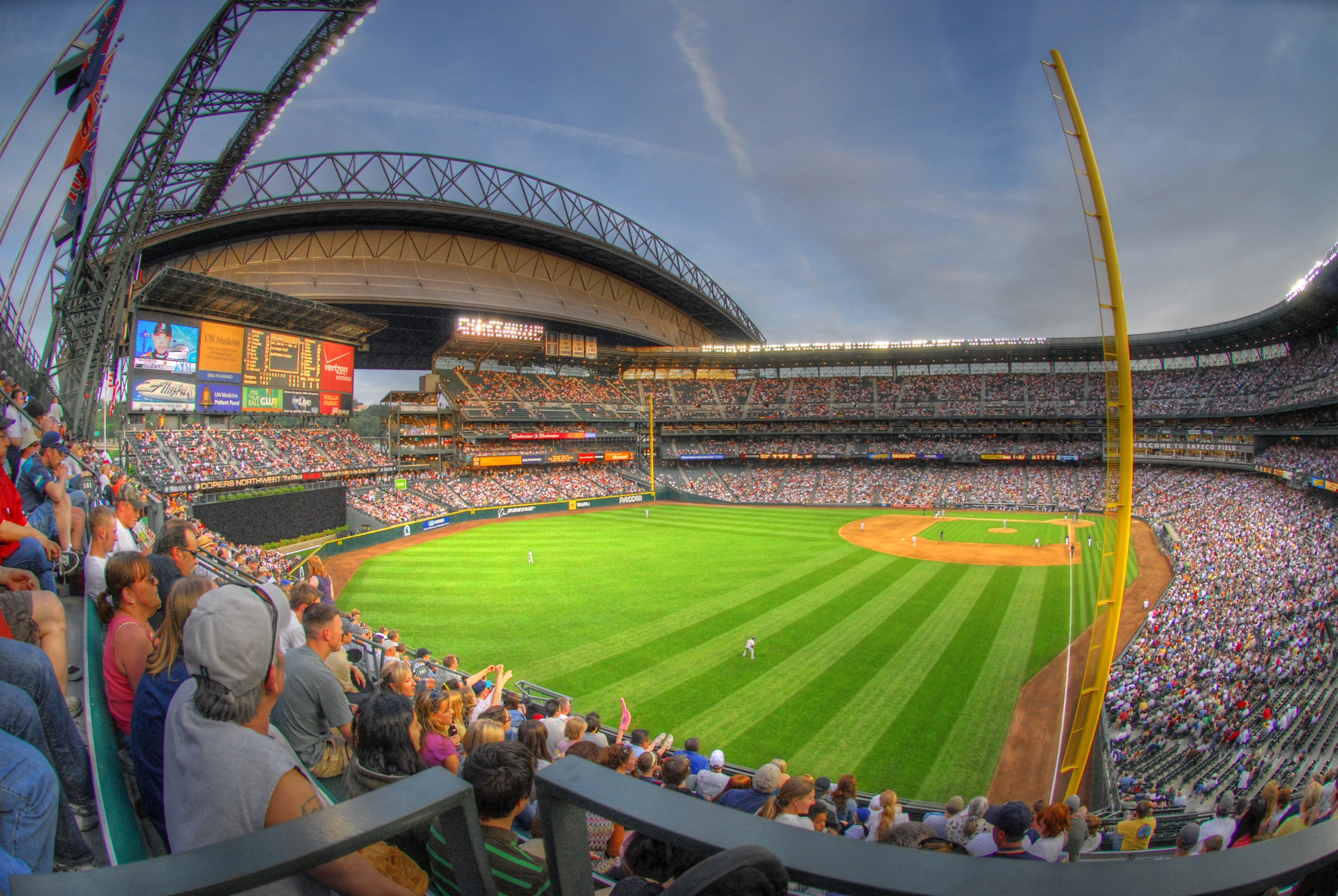
T-Mobile Park, home of the Seattle Mariners

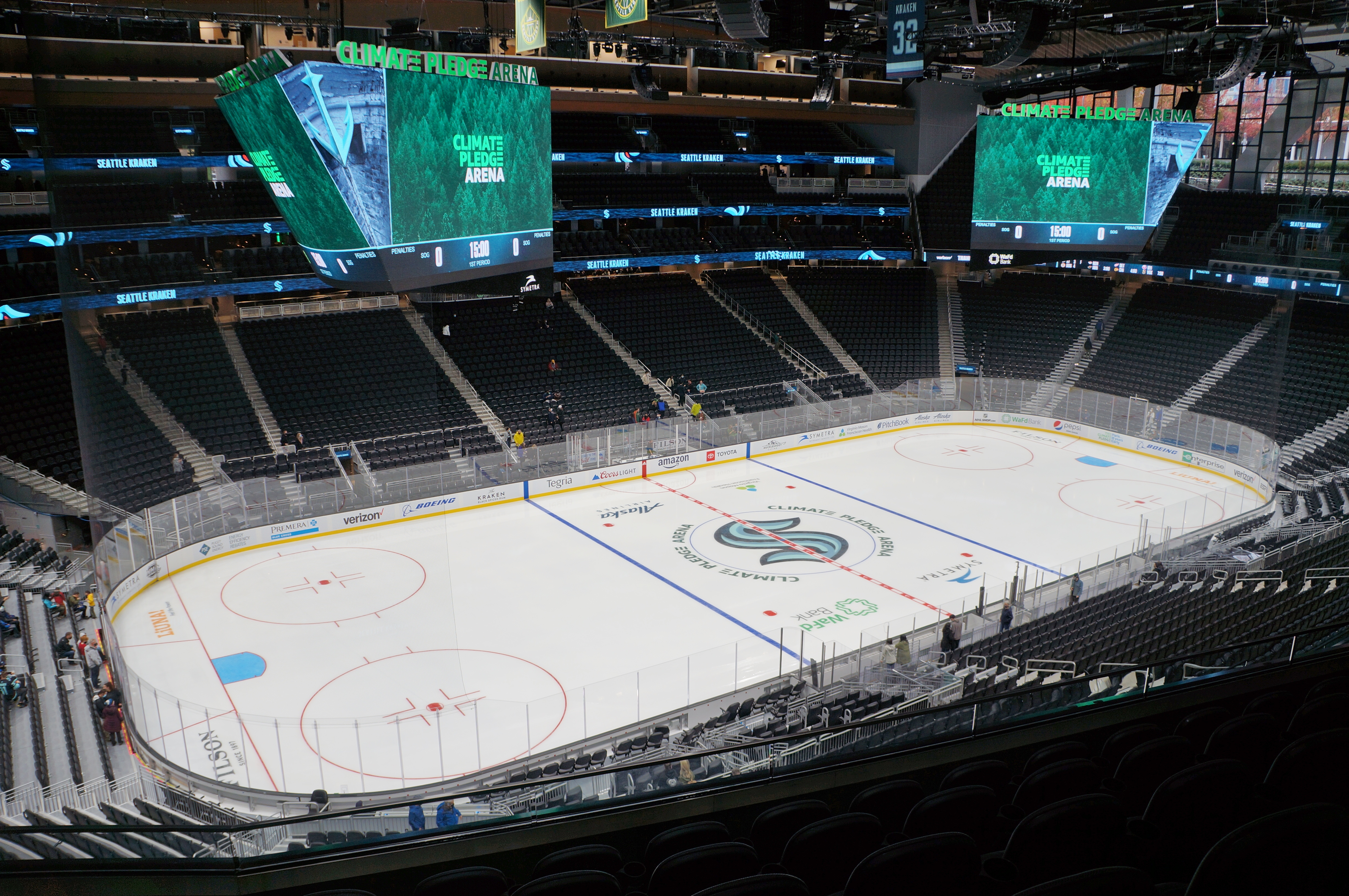
Climate Pledge Arena, home of the Seattle Kraken, Seattle Storm, and Seattle Torrent

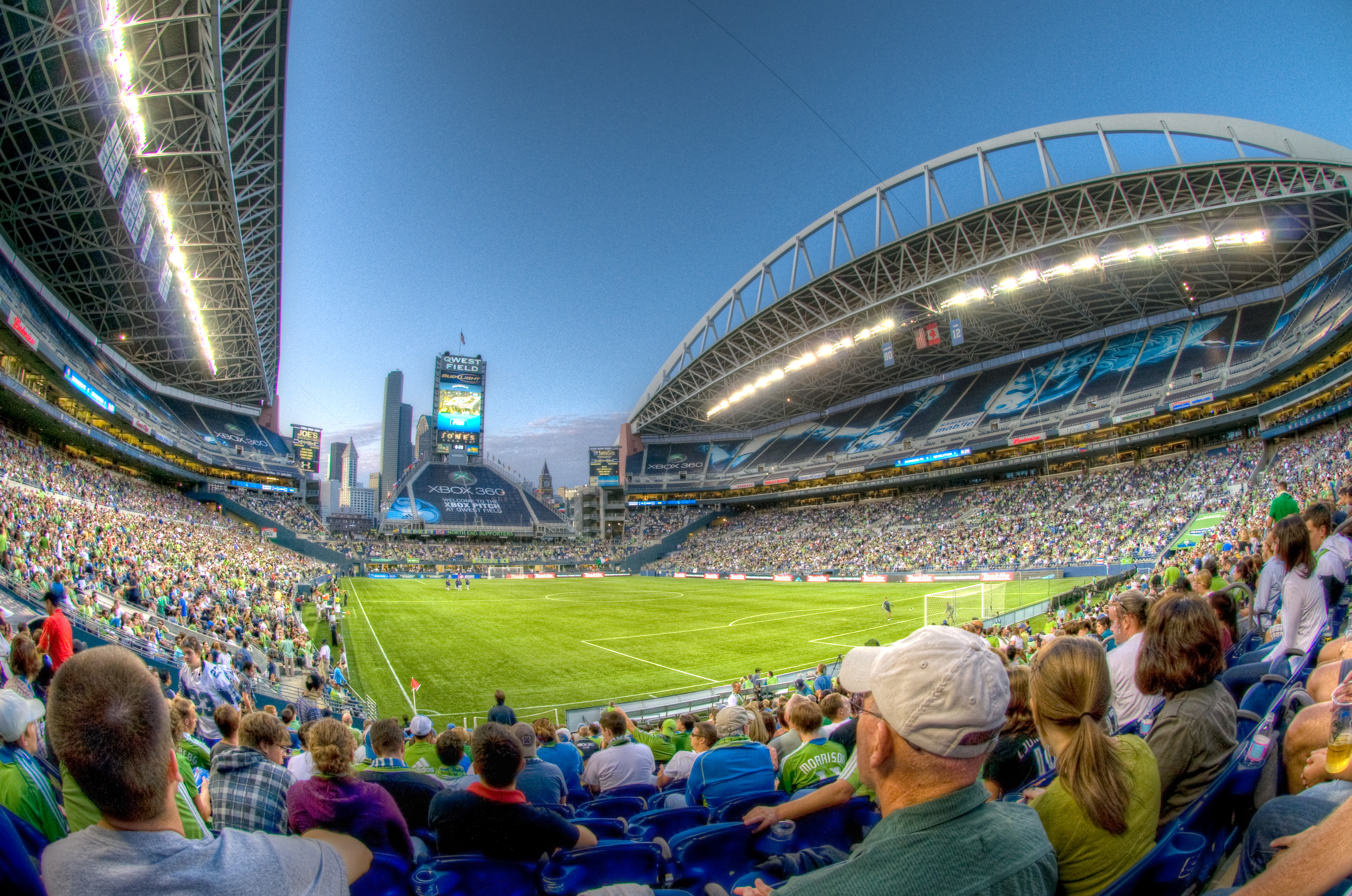
Lumen Field during a Sounders match

Seattle has four major men's professional sports teams: the National Football League (NFL)'s Seattle Seahawks, Major League Baseball (MLB)'s Seattle Mariners, the National Hockey League (NHL)'s Seattle Kraken, and Major League Soccer (MLS)'s Seattle Sounders FC. Other professional sports teams include the Seattle Seawolves of Major League Rugby (MLR). Seattle is the only U.S. city to have teams in three professional women's leagues: the Seattle Storm of the Women's National Basketball Association; Seattle Reign FC in the National Women's Soccer League; and the Seattle Torrent in the Professional Women's Hockey League.

Seattle's professional sports history began at the start of the 20th century with the PCHA's Seattle Metropolitans, which in 1917 became the first American hockey team to win the Stanley Cup. In 1969, Seattle was awarded a Major League Baseball franchise, the Seattle Pilots. Based at Sick's Stadium in Mount Baker, home to Seattle's former minor-league teams, the Pilots played in Seattle for one season before relocating to Milwaukee and becoming the Milwaukee Brewers. The city, alongside the county and state governments, sued the league and was offered a second expansion team, later named the Seattle Mariners, as settlement.

The Mariners began play in 1977 at the multi-purpose Kingdome, where the team struggled for most of its time. Relative success in the mid-to-late 1990s saved the team from being relocated and allowed them to move to a purpose-built baseball stadium, T-Mobile Park (formerly Safeco Field), in 1999. As of 2025, the Mariners are the only modern Major League Baseball franchise to have never reached a World Series. They have only appeared in the MLB playoffs six times, the most recent in 2025 (where they came within one win of advancing to the World Series), but have had Hall of Fame players and candidates like Ken Griffey Jr., Randy Johnson, Ichiro Suzuki, and Alex Rodriguez. The team tied the all-time MLB single regular season wins record in 2001 with 116 wins. From 2001 to 2022, the Mariners failed to qualify for the playoffs—the then-longest active postseason drought in major North American sports, at 20 seasons.

The Seattle Seahawks entered the National Football League in 1976 as an expansion team and have advanced to the Super Bowl four times: 2005, 2013, 2014, and 2025. The team played in the Kingdome until it was imploded in 2000 and moved into Qwest Field (now Lumen Field) at the same site in 2002. The Seahawks lost Super Bowl XL in 2005 to the Pittsburgh Steelers in Detroit, but won Super Bowl XLVIII in 2013 by defeating the Denver Broncos 43–8 at MetLife Stadium. The team advanced to the Super Bowl the following year, but lost to the New England Patriots in Super Bowl XLIX on a last-minute play. In Super Bowl LX, the Seahawks defeated the Patriots 29–13. Seahawks fans have set stadium noise records on several occasions and are collectively known as the "12th Man".

Seattle Sounders FC has played in Major League Soccer since 2009, as the latest continuation of the original 1974 Sounders team of the North American Soccer League after an incarnation in the lower divisions of American soccer. Sharing Lumen Field with the Seahawks, the team set various attendance records in its first few MLS seasons, averaging over 43,000 per match and placing themselves among the top 30 teams internationally. The Sounders have won the MLS Supporters' Shield in 2014 and the U.S. Open Cup on four occasions: 2009, 2010, 2011, and 2014. The Sounders won the first of their two MLS Cup titles in 2016, defeating Toronto FC 5–4 in a penalty shootout in Toronto, before finishing as runners-up in a rematch against Toronto in MLS Cup 2017. In 2019 the Sounders made their first-ever home-field appearance in MLS Cup, once again against Toronto FC, and won the game 3–1 to earn their second MLS Cup title in front of a club-record attendance of 69,274. The stadium also hosted the second leg of the 2022 CONCACAF Champions League Final, played in front of 68,741 to break the tournament attendance record. The Sounders became the first MLS team to win a continental title since 2000 and the first to win the modern Champions League.

Seattle's Major League Rugby team, the Seattle Seawolves, play in nearby Tukwila at the Starfire Sports Complex, a small stadium that is also used by the Sounders for their U.S. Open Cup matches. The team began play in 2018 and won the league's inaugural championship. They successfully defended their title in the 2019 season and finished as runners-up in the 2022 championship game.

From 1967 to 2008, Seattle was home to the Seattle SuperSonics of the National Basketball Association (NBA), the city's first major professional sports team. A frequent playoff participant, the Sonics were the 1978–79 NBA champions, and also contended for the championship in 1978 and 1996. Following a team sale in 2006, a failed effort to replace the aging KeyArena, and settlement of a lawsuit to hold the team to the final two years of its lease with the city, the SuperSonics relocated to Oklahoma City and became the Oklahoma City Thunder ahead of the 2008–09 season. An effort in 2013 to purchase the Sacramento Kings franchise and relocate it to Seattle as a resurrected Sonics squad was denied by the NBA board of governors.

The Seattle Storm of the Women's National Basketball Association have also played their games at KeyArena (now Climate Pledge Arena) since their foundation in 2000. The WNBA granted Seattle their expansion side following the popularity of the recently folded Seattle Reign, a women's professional basketball team that played from 1996 to 1998 in the rival American Basketball League. The Storm began as a sister team to the now-defunct Sonics of the NBA, but sold to separate Seattle-based ownership in 2006. Tied for the league record, the Storm have claimed the WNBA championship on four occasions, winning in 2004, 2010, 2018, and 2020. The team also won the first-ever WNBA Commissioner's Cup in 2021.

The Seattle Thunderbirds hockey team has represented Seattle in the Canadian major-junior Western Hockey League since 1977. Originally playing in Mercer Arena and the Seattle Center Coliseum (which had hosted previous minor-league hockey teams), the Thunderbirds have been based at the ShoWare Center in the suburb of Kent since 2007, and have won one WHL championship in 2017. In 1974, Seattle was awarded a conditional expansion franchise in the National Hockey League; however, this opportunity did not come to fruition. In 2018, a new Seattle-based group successfully applied for an expansion team in the NHL, which was named the Seattle Kraken and began play in 2021. The SuperSonics' former home arena, KeyArena (now Climate Pledge Arena), underwent major renovations from 2018 to 2021 to accommodate the new NHL team. The NHL ownership group reached its goal of 10,000 deposits within 12 minutes of opening a ticket drive, which later increased to 25,000 in 75 minutes.

Seattle Reign FC, a founding member of the National Women's Soccer League, was founded in 2012, holding their home games in Seattle from 2014 to 2018 and again since 2022. The team name was chosen to honor the defunct women's basketball team of the same name. The club played at the Starfire Sports Complex in nearby Tukwila for the league's inaugural 2013 season before moving to Seattle Center's Memorial Stadium in 2014. Under new management, the team moved to Tacoma's Cheney Stadium in 2019, before moving to Seattle's Lumen Field in 2022. In 2020, OL Groupe, the parent company of French clubs Olympique Lyonnais and Olympique Lyonnais Féminin, became the team's majority owner and rebranded the club as OL Reign. The Seattle Reign name was restored in 2024.

The Seattle Torrent are one of the first two expansion teams, along with the Vancouver Goldeneyes, in the Professional Women's Hockey League (PWHL), the top-tier women's ice hockey league in the United States and Canada. The team were founded in 2025 and began play in the 2025–26 season. Supported by the NHL's Seattle Kraken, the team plays its home games at Climate Pledge Arena.

Seattle has also been home to various minor-league professional teams, of which currently Ballard FC and West Seattle Junction FC of USL League 2 in soccer remain. Representing the Seattle neighborhood of Ballard, Ballard FC was founded in 2022 as an independent, semi-professional soccer team in the fourth-division USL League 2. The team is owned by a group led by former Sounders player Lamar Neagle and won its first national title in 2023. Ballard FC's primary home is the 1,000-seat Interbay Soccer Stadium (also home to Seattle Pacific University's and Ballard High School's soccer teams), but during that field's renovations in the 2024 season, Ballard will play out of Memorial Stadium at the Seattle Center. West Seattle Junction FC, representing the neighborhood of West Seattle, joined USL League 2 during the 2024 season.

The short-lived Seattle Sea Dragons, originally the Dragons, of the XFL played at Lumen Field in the league's inaugural season in 2020 prior to its suspension due to the COVID-19 pandemic. The Sea Dragons returned alongside the XFL in 2023 after the league's re-launch under new ownership. The team folded prior to the 2024 season during the XFL's merger with the United States Football League to form the United Football League.

Seattle also boasts two collegiate sports programs based at the University of Washington and Seattle University, both competing in NCAA Division I for various sports. The University of Washington's athletic program, nicknamed the Huskies, competes in the Big Ten Conference, and Seattle University's athletic program, nicknamed the Redhawks, mostly competes in the Western Athletic Conference. The Huskies teams use several facilities, including the 70,000-seat Husky Stadium for football and the Hec Edmundson Pavilion for basketball and volleyball. The two schools have basketball and soccer teams that compete against each other in non-conference games and have formed a local rivalry due to their sporting success.

The Major League Baseball All-Star Game has been held in Seattle three times, once at the Kingdome in 1979, and twice at T-Mobile Park in 2001 and 2023. The NBA All-Star Game was also held in Seattle twice: the first in 1974 at the Seattle Center Coliseum and the second in 1987 at the Kingdome. Lumen Field hosted MLS Cup 2009, played between Real Salt Lake and the Los Angeles Galaxy, as a neutral site in front of 46,011 spectators. Seattle was one of eleven US host cities for the 2026 FIFA World Cup, with matches played at Lumen Field and training facilities at Longacres in Renton, Washington.

== Parks and recreation ==
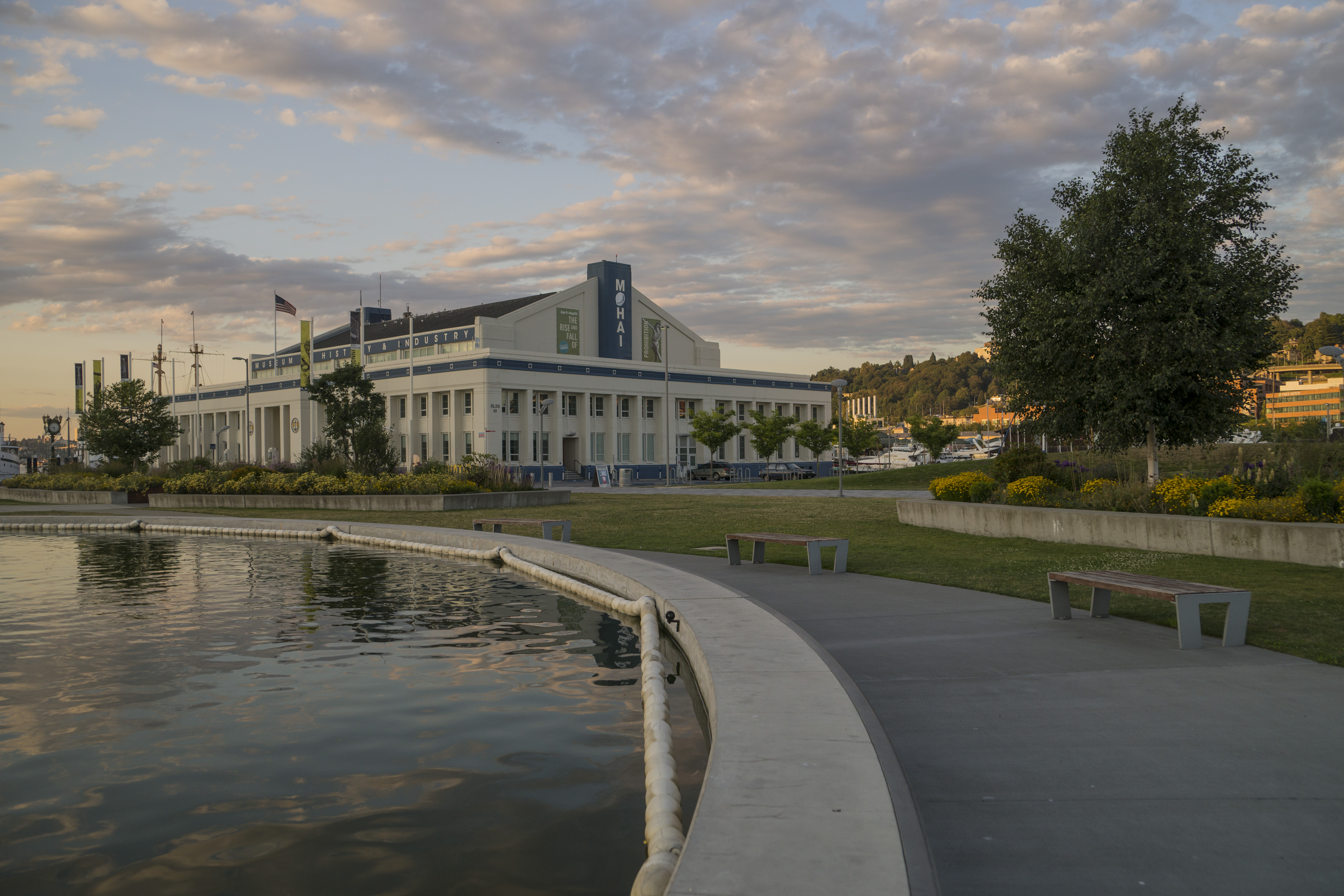
Lake Union Park at the southern end of Lake Union

Seattle's mild, temperate marine climate allows year-round outdoor recreation, including walking, cycling, hiking, skiing, snowboarding, kayaking, rock climbing, motorboating, sailing, team sports, and swimming. The city parks system encompasses 485 parks, shorelines, and preserved spaces that total 6,500 acres (2,600 ha)—12 percent of the land area of Seattle. These city-owned facilities include 25 miles (40 km) of boulevards and 120 miles (190 km) of walking and hiking trails, athletic fields, swimming pools, community centers, bathhouses, and performance spaces. The Trust for Public Land estimates that 99 percent of residents live within a 1/2 mile (0.80 km) of a city park. The park prevalence has been attributed partially to a success of the system of Olmsted parks in Seattle.

The largest park in the city is Discovery Park, which includes 534 acres (2.16 km^{2}) of forestland and saltwater beaches along the bluffs in Magnolia. Among the most popular Seattle parks are Green Lake, which is ringed by a walking trail; Alki Beach Park on the southwest side of Elliott Bay; Myrtle Edwards Park near the downtown waterfront; Volunteer Park on Capitol Hill; and Seward Park on Lake Washington. Several city parks include panoramic views of the Seattle skyline, including Kerry Park on Queen Anne Hill and Gas Works Park in Wallingford, which features the preserved superstructure of a coal gasification plant closed in 1956.

Seattle has a network of recreational and commuting trails for cyclists and pedestrians, mainly repurposed from disused railroads or built alongside regional highways. The Burke–Gilman Trail, which travels for 27 miles (43 km) along the Ship Canal and Lake Washington between Ballard and Bothell, first opened in 1978 on a former railroad. The Mountains to Sound Trail connects the Interstate 90 corridor, including the north side of the Homer M. Hadley Memorial Bridge, and is planned to be extended to Snoqualmie. Other non-motorized paths include the Overlook Walk, which opened in 2024 to connect Pike Place Market to the downtown waterfront via a set of overpasses that integrate with an expansion of the Seattle Aquarium.

== Government and politics ==
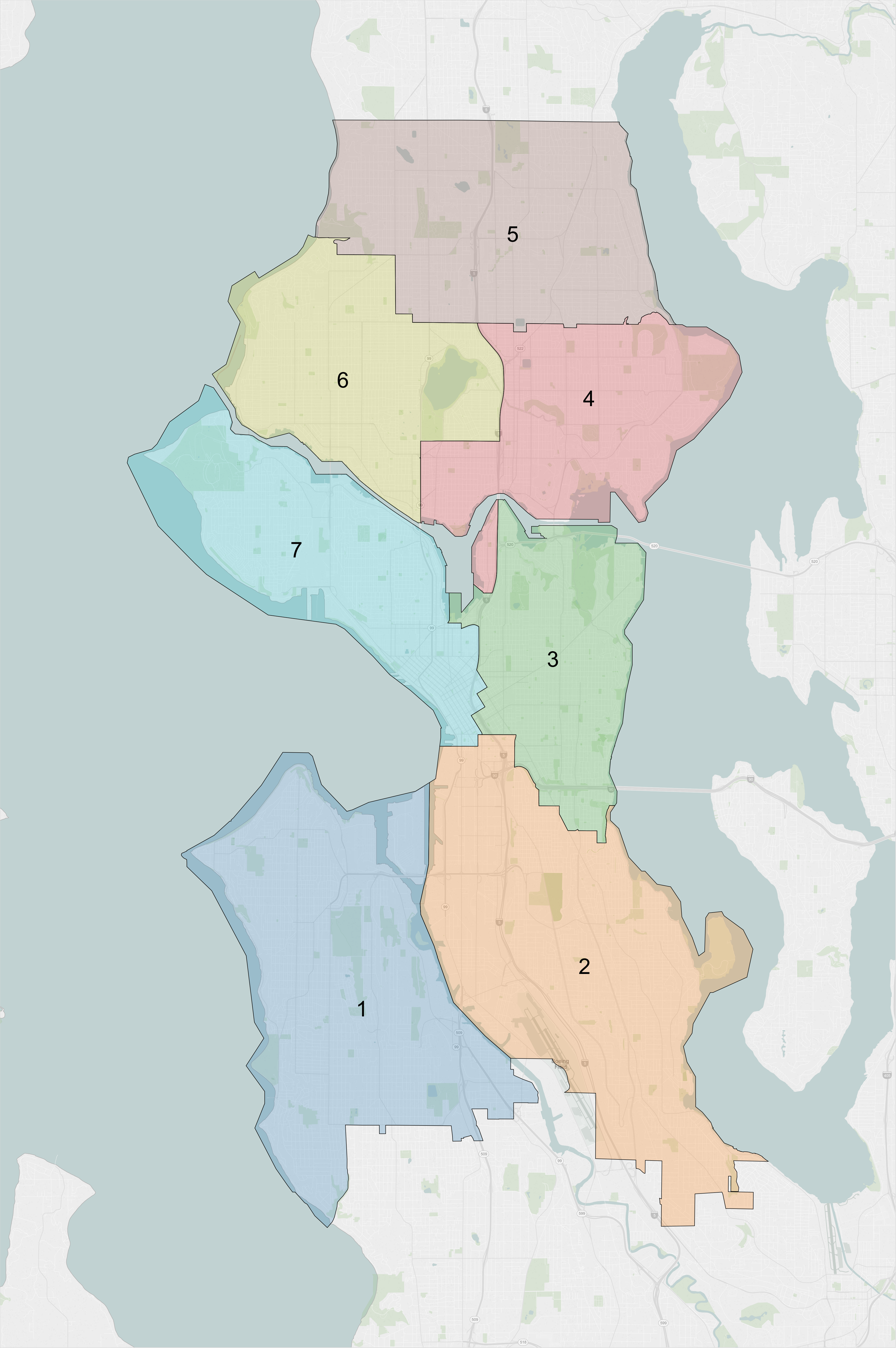
Seattle City Council consists of two at-large positions and seven district seats representing the areas shown from 2016 to 2023.

Seattle is a charter city, with a mayor–council form of government. From 1911 to 2013, Seattle's nine city councillors were elected at large, rather than by geographic subdivisions. For the 2015 election, this changed to a hybrid system of seven district members and two at-large members as a result of a ballot measure passed on November 5, 2013. The only other elected offices are the city attorney and Municipal Court judges. All city offices are officially non-partisan. Like some other parts of the United States, government and laws are also run by a series of ballot initiatives (allowing citizens to pass or reject laws), referendums (allowing citizens to approve or reject legislation already passed), and propositions (allowing specific government agencies to propose new laws or tax increases directly to the people).

Seattle is widely considered one of the most socially liberal cities in the United States. In the 2012 U.S. general election, a majority of Seattleites voted to approve Referendum 74 and legalize gay marriage in Washington state. In the same election, an overwhelming majority of Seattleites also voted to approve the legalization of the recreational use of cannabis in the state. Like much of the Pacific Northwest (which has the lowest rate of church attendance in the United States and consistently reports the highest percentage of atheism), church attendance, religious belief, and political influence of religious leaders are much lower than in other parts of America. Seattle's political culture is very liberal and progressive for the United States, with over 80% of the population voting for the Democratic Party. All precincts in Seattle voted for Democratic Party candidate Barack Obama in the 2012 presidential election. In partisan elections for the Washington State Legislature and United States Congress, nearly all elections are won by Democrats. Although local elections are nonpartisan, most of the city's elected officials are known to be Democrats.

In 1926, Seattle became the first major American city to elect a female mayor, Bertha Knight Landes. It has also elected an openly gay mayor, Ed Murray, and a third-party socialist councillor, Kshama Sawant. For the first time in United States history, an openly gay black woman was elected to public office when Sherry Harris was elected as a Seattle city councilor in 1991. In 2015, the majority of the city council was female.

Katie Wilson was elected as mayor in the 2025 mayoral election, by a margin of 2,000 votes, and defeated incumbent Bruce Harrell. She took office on January 1, 2026, becoming the third woman to serve as mayor. The mayor's office also includes three deputy mayors, appointed to advise the mayor on policies.

In 2023, the city council voted to ban caste discrimination as part of the city's anti-discrimination laws. The ban is the first in the United States.

Seattle lies within four districts on the King County Council: the 1st district includes the northeastern corner of the city; the 2nd district generally covers areas east of Interstate 5 and south of Northeast 65th Street; the 4th district consists of the northwestern neighborhoods of Ballard, Fremont, Magnolia, and Queen Anne; and the 8th district includes Downtown Seattle, First Hill, SODO, and West Seattle. At the state level, Seattle is divided into six districts that each have one state senator and two state representatives.

Federally, Seattle is split between two congressional districts. Most of the city is in 7th congressional district, represented by Democrat Pramila Jayapal, the first Indian-American woman elected to Congress. She succeeded 28-year incumbent and fellow Democrat Jim McDermott. Part of southeastern Seattle is in the 9th congressional district, represented by Democrat Adam Smith since 1997. The border between the two districts follows the Tukwila city limits around Boeing Field, Interstate 5, South Dearborn Street, 4th Avenue South, James Street, Madison Street, East Union Street, Martin Luther King Jr. Way, and East Yesler Way.

== Education ==
Of the city's population over the age of 25, 53.8% (vs. a national average of 27.4%) hold a bachelor's degree or higher, and 91.9% (vs. 84.5% nationally) have a high school diploma or equivalent. A 2008 United States Census Bureau survey showed that Seattle had the highest percentage of college and university graduates of any major U.S. city. The city was listed as the most literate of the country's 69 largest cities in 2005 and 2006, the second most literate in 2007 and the most literate in 2008 in studies conducted by Central Connecticut State University.

Seattle Public Schools is the school district for the vast majority of the city. The school district desegregated without a court order but still struggles to achieve racial balance in a somewhat ethnically divided city (the south part of town having more ethnic minorities than the north). In 2007, Seattle's racial tie-breaking system was struck down by the United States Supreme Court, but the ruling left the door open for desegregation formulae based on other indicators (e.g., income or socioeconomic class). A small portion of the city's Delridge neighborhood lies within the boundaries of the Highline School District.

The public school system is supplemented by a moderate number of private schools: Five of the private high schools are Catholic, one is Lutheran, and six are secular.

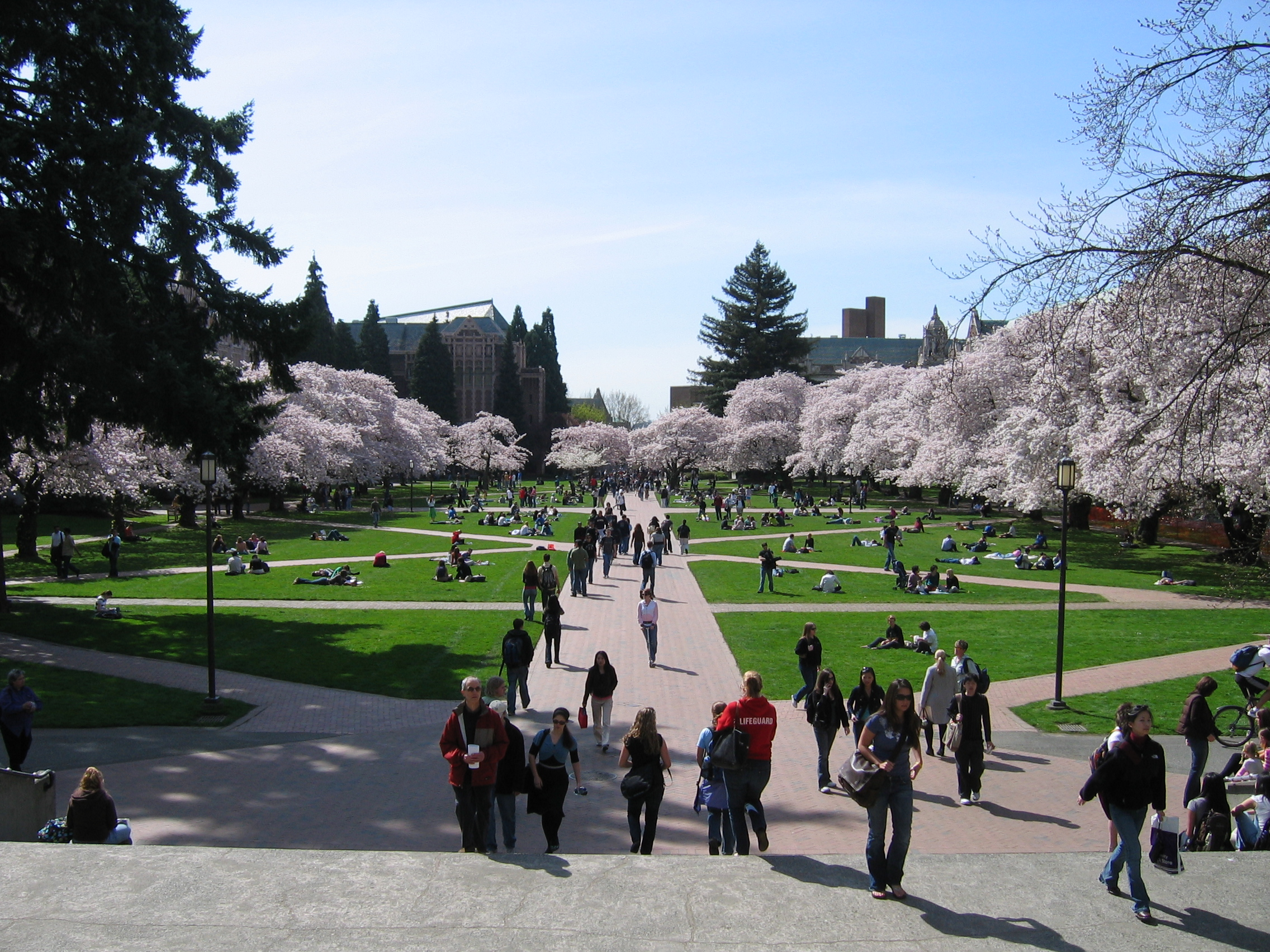
University of Washington Quad

Seattle is home to the University of Washington and its professional and continuing education unit, the University of Washington Continuum College. The UW receives more federal research and development funding than any public institution. Over the last 10 years, it has also produced more Peace Corps volunteers than any other U.S. university.

Seattle also has a number of smaller private universities, including Seattle University and Seattle Pacific University, the former a Jesuit Catholic institution, the latter a Free Methodist institution. The Seattle Colleges District operates three colleges: North Seattle College, Seattle Central College, and South Seattle College. Universities aimed at the working adult are the City University and Antioch University. Seminaries include Western Seminary and a number of arts colleges, such as Cornish College of the Arts, Pratt Fine Arts Center. In 2001, Time magazine selected Seattle Central Community College as community college of the year, saying that the school "pushes diverse students to work together in small teams."

== Media ==
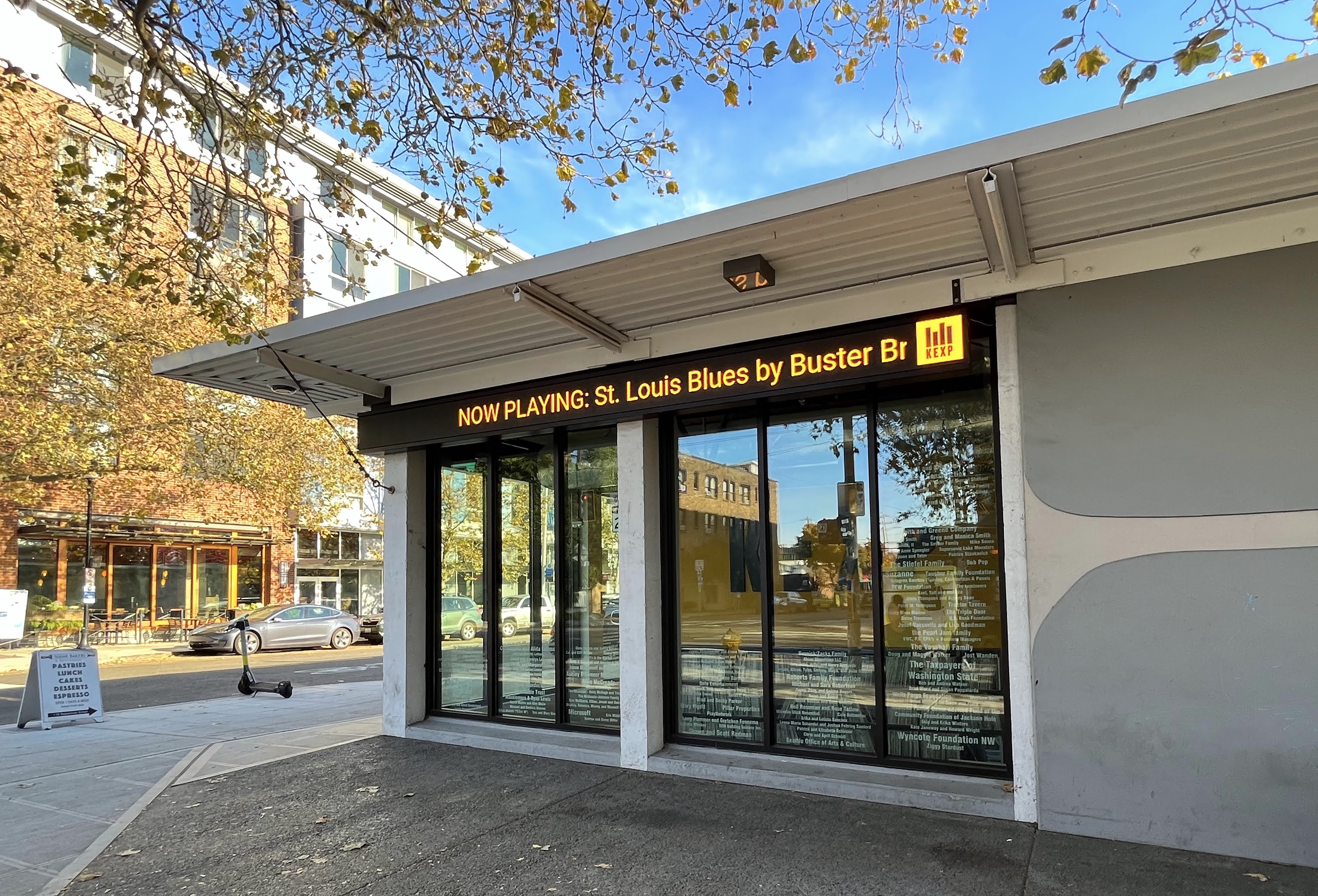
KEXP's Seattle Center Studio. Public concerts are occasionally hosted inside.

The Seattle Times is the lone daily newspaper in the city and was founded in 1896; it is one of the few remaining family-owned major newspapers in the United States. The Seattle Post-Intelligencer, known as the P-I, published a daily newspaper from 1863 to March 17, 2009, before switching to a strictly online publication. Other daily newspapers in the city include the business publication Seattle Daily Journal of Commerce and the University of Washington's student-run newspaper The Daily. The most prominent weeklies are the Seattle Weekly and The Stranger; both consider themselves "alternative" papers. The weekly LGBT newspaper is the Seattle Gay News. Real Change is a weekly street newspaper that is sold mainly by homeless persons as an alternative to panhandling. There are also several ethnic newspapers, including The Facts, Northwest Asian Weekly and the International Examiner. Several Seattle neighborhoods had weekly publications, including the Ballard News-Tribune, Capitol Hill Times, and West Seattle Herald, that were shut down in the early 21st century; hyperlocal neighborhood blogs have emerged as an alternative to these weeklies.

Seattle is also well served by television and radio, with all major U.S. networks represented, along with at least five other English-language stations and two Spanish-language stations. Seattle cable viewers also receive CBUT 2 (CBC) from Vancouver, British Columbia.

Non-commercial radio stations include NPR member stations KUOW-FM 94.9 and KNKX 88.5 (Tacoma), as well as classical music station KING-FM 98.1. Other non-commercial stations include KEXP-FM 90.3 (affiliated with the UW), community radio KBCS-FM 91.3 (affiliated with Bellevue College), and high school radio KNHC-FM 89.5, which broadcasts an electronic dance music radio format, is owned by the public school system and operated by students of Nathan Hale High School. Many Seattle radio stations are available through Internet radio, with KEXP in particular being a pioneer of Internet radio. Seattle also has numerous commercial radio stations. In a March 2012 report by the consumer research firm Arbitron, the top FM stations were KRWM (adult contemporary format), KIRO-FM (news/talk), and KISW (active rock) while the top AM stations were KNWN (Formerly KOMO) (all news), KJR (AM) (all sports), KIRO (AM) (all sports).

== Infrastructure ==
=== Health systems ===
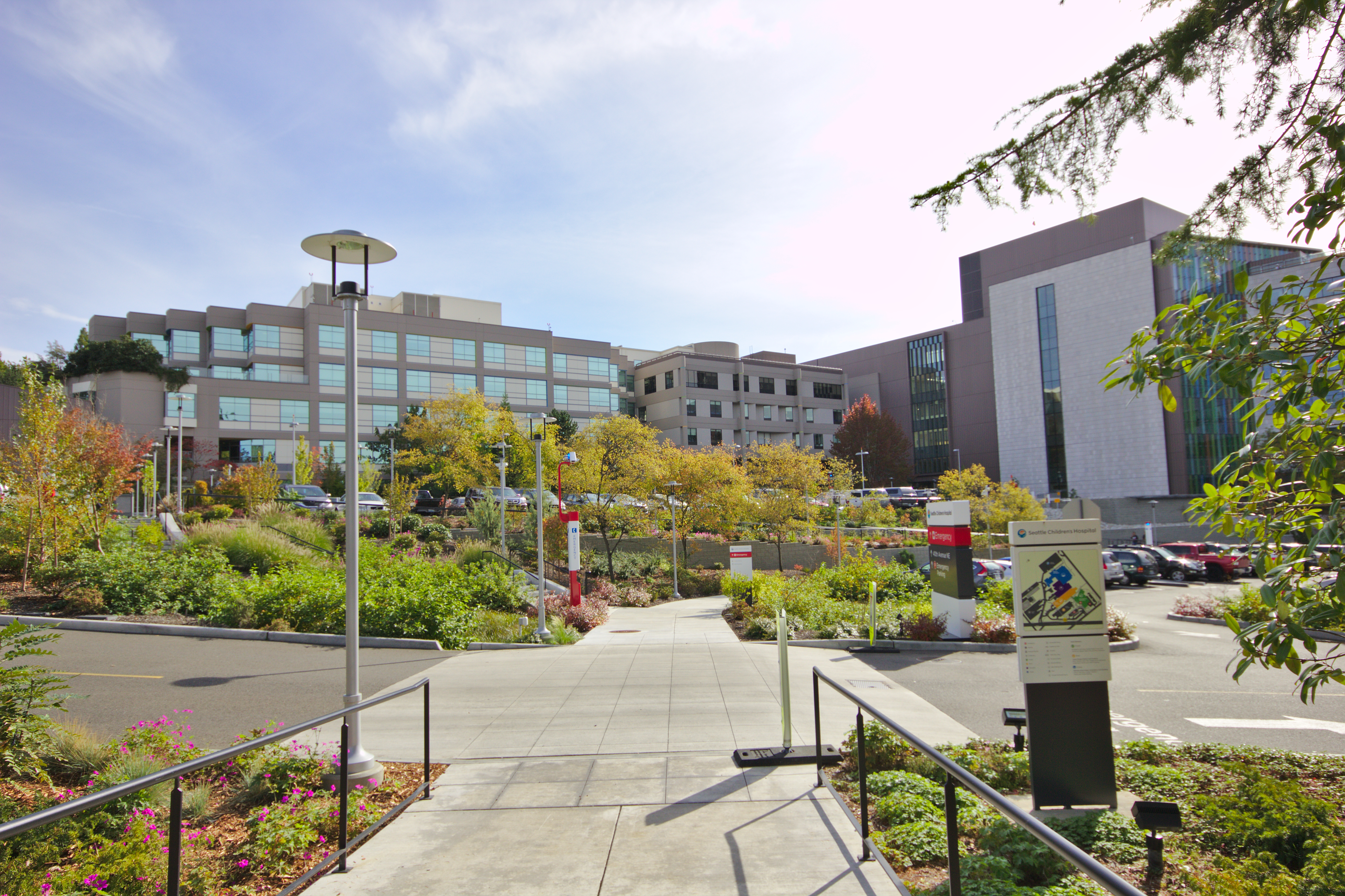
Seattle Children's in Laurelhurst

Harborview and two other major hospitals—Virginia Mason Medical Center and Swedish Medical Center—are located on First Hill, which is nicknamed "Pill Hill" for its concentration of medical facilities.

Located in the Laurelhurst neighborhood, Seattle Children's, formerly Children's Hospital and Regional Medical Center, is the pediatric referral center for Washington, Alaska, Montana, and Idaho. The Fred Hutchinson Cancer Research Center has a campus in the Eastlake neighborhood. The University District is home to the University of Washington Medical Center which, along with Harborview, is operated by the University of Washington. Seattle is also served by a Veterans Affairs hospital on Beacon Hill, a third campus of Swedish in Ballard, and UW Medical Center - Northwest near Northgate Station.

Seattle has seen local developments of modern paramedic services with the establishment of Medic One in 1970. Seattle has several pharmacy chains; these include Walgreens, and formerly Bartell Drugs, which was family-run in Seattle until its acquisition by Rite Aid in 2020 and then closed in 2025. As of 2024, Seattle lacks a 24-hour retail pharmacy due to the closure of locations across several chains.

=== Transportation ===
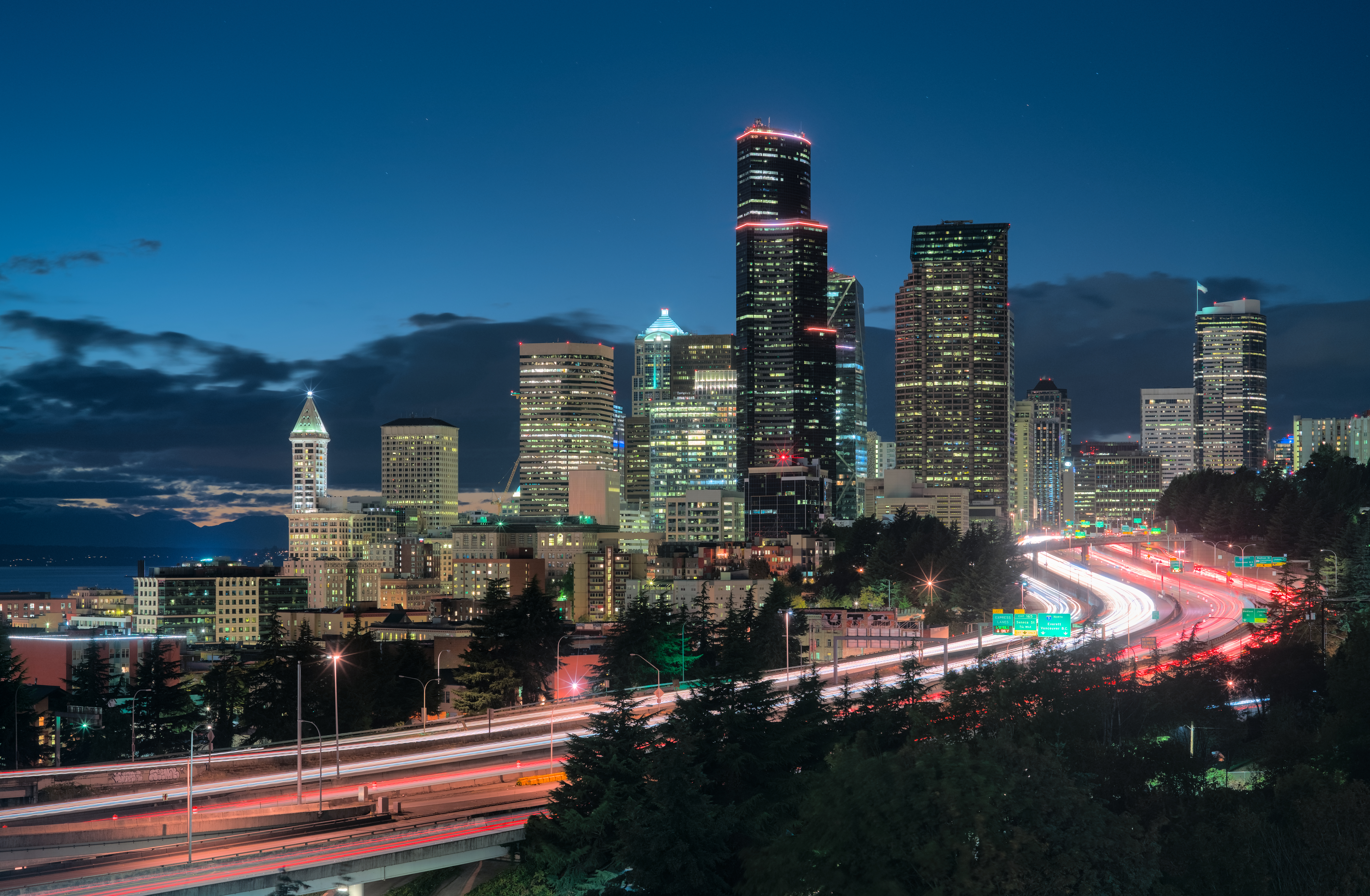
Interstate 5 passing through downtown Seattle

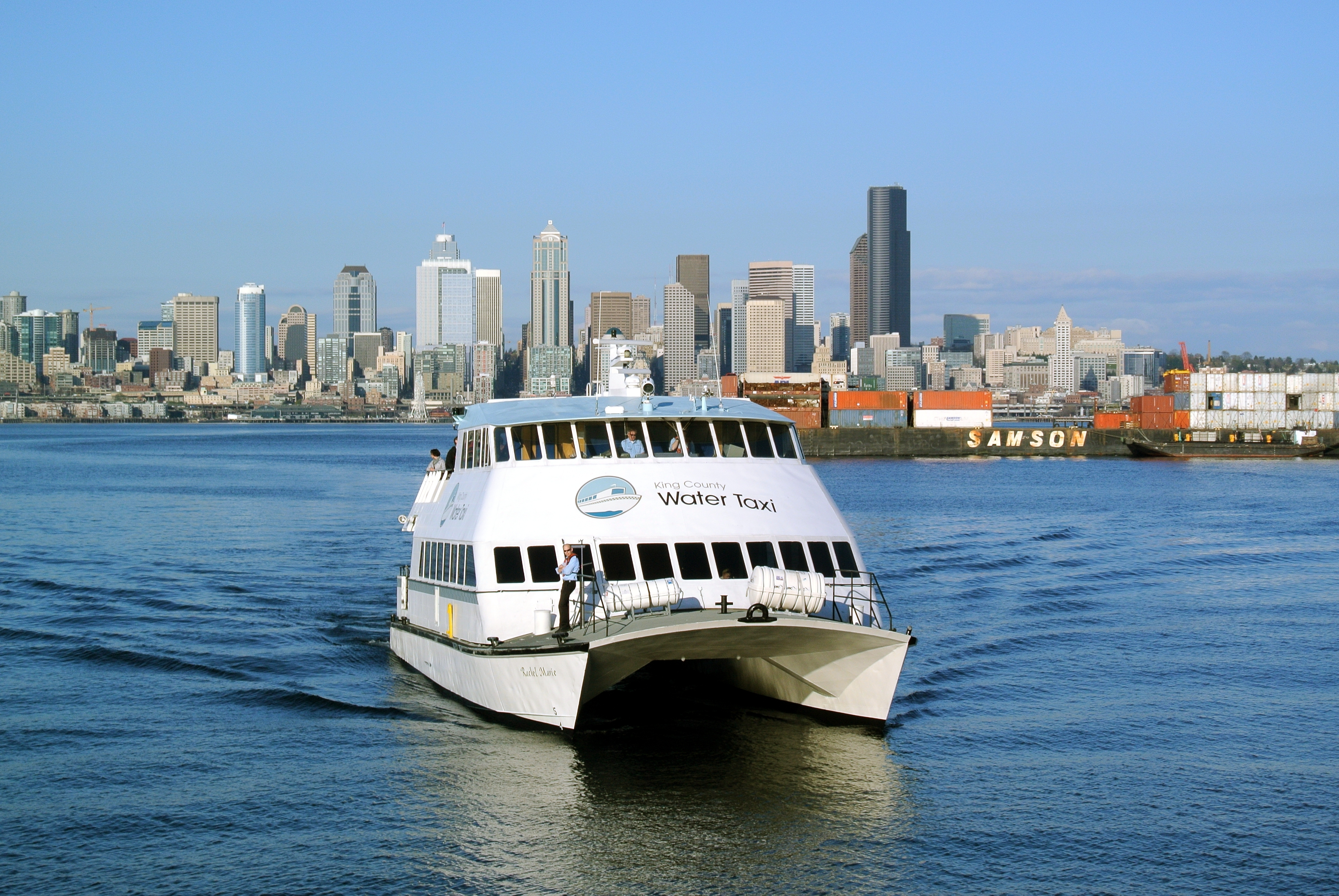
King County Water Taxi and downtown Seattle

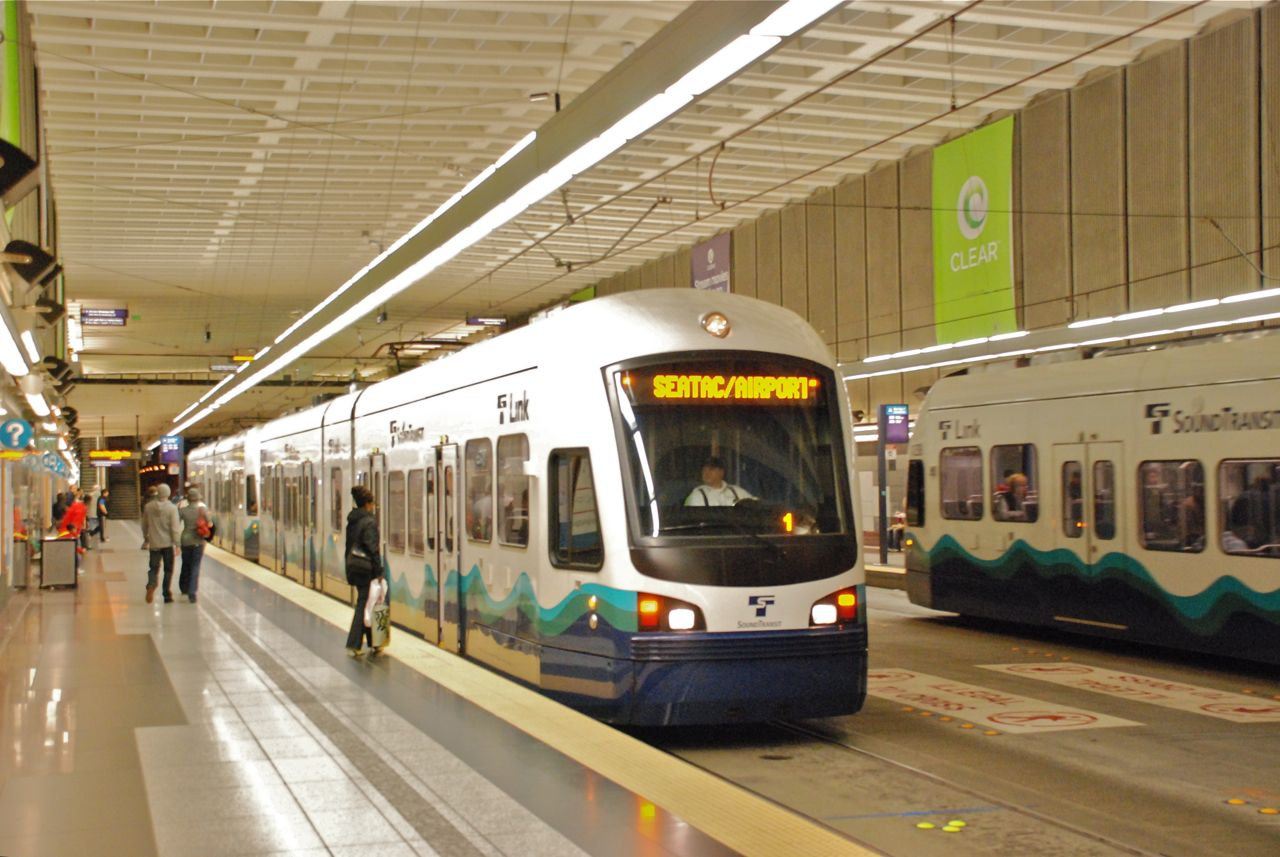
1 Line light rail trains in the Downtown Seattle Transit Tunnel at University Street Station

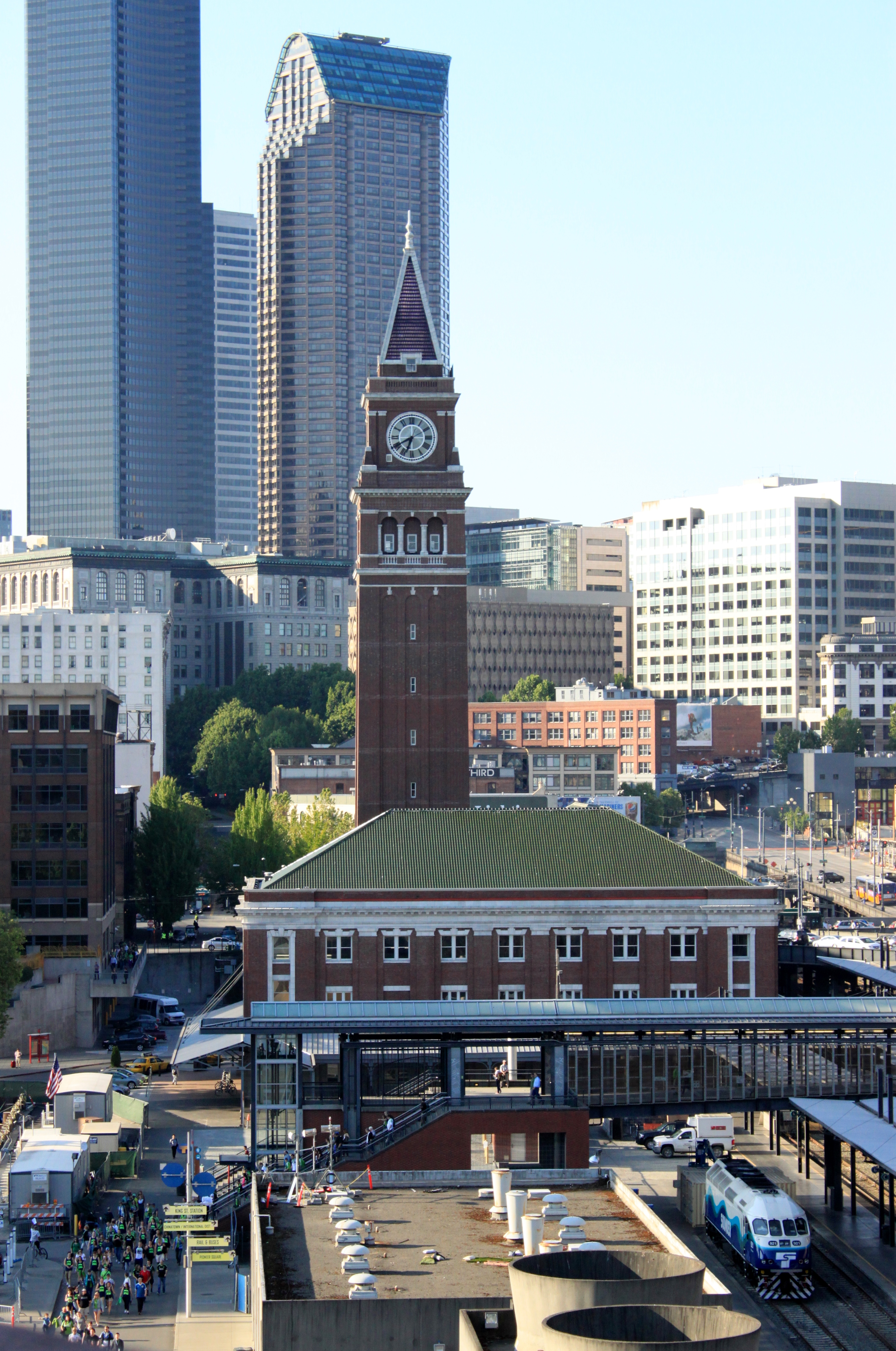
King Street Station, the 15th-busiest Amtrak station in the nation, also serves commuter trains.

The first streetcars appeared in 1889 and were instrumental in the creation of a relatively well-defined downtown and strong neighborhoods at the end of their lines. The advent of the automobile began the dismantling of rail in Seattle. Tacoma–Seattle railway service ended in 1929 and the Everett–Seattle service came to an end in 1939, replaced by automobiles running on the recently developed highway system. Rails on city streets were paved over or removed, and the opening of the Seattle trolleybus system brought the end of streetcars in Seattle in 1941. This left an extensive network of privately owned buses (later public) as the only mass transit within the city and throughout the region.

King County Metro provides regular bus service in the city and county, and the South Lake Union Streetcar line and the First Hill Streetcar line. Seattle is one of the few cities in North America whose bus fleet includes electric trolleybuses. Sound Transit provides an express bus service within the metropolitan area, two Sounder commuter rail lines between the suburbs and downtown, and its 1 Line light rail line between Northgate and Angle Lake.

Washington State Ferries, which manages the largest network of ferries in the United States and third-largest in the world, connects Seattle to Bainbridge and Vashon Islands in Puget Sound and to Bremerton and Southworth on the Kitsap Peninsula. In addition to the state's large car ferries, passenger-only catamarans are operated by other public agencies to provide service on water taxi and "fast ferry" routes. King Street Station in Pioneer Square serves Amtrak intercity trains and Sounder commuter trains, and is located adjacent to the International District/Chinatown light rail station.

According to the 2007 American Community Survey, 18.6% of Seattle residents used one of the three public transit systems that serve the city, giving it the highest transit ridership of all major cities without heavy or light rail prior to the completion of Sound Transit's 1 Line.

Seattle–Tacoma International Airport, locally known as Sea-Tac Airport and located just south in the neighboring city of SeaTac, is operated by the Port of Seattle and provides commercial air service to destinations throughout the world. Closer to downtown, Boeing Field is used for general aviation, cargo flights, and testing/delivery of Boeing airliners. A secondary passenger airport, Paine Field, opened in 2019 and is located in Everett, 25 miles (40 km) north of Seattle. It is predominantly used by Boeing and their large assembly plant located nearby.

The main mode of transportation is the street system, which is laid out in a cardinal directions grid pattern, except in the central business district where early city leaders Arthur Denny and Carson Boren insisted on orienting the plats relative to the shoreline rather than to true north. The city's topography, formed by the recession of glaciers, created north–south troughs that did not allow east–west streets to be continuous; only Madison Street runs uninterrupted from Elliott Bay to Lake Washington. Only two roads, Interstate 5 and State Route 99 (both limited-access highways) run uninterrupted through the city from north to south.

From 1953 to 2019, State Route 99 ran through downtown Seattle on the Alaskan Way Viaduct, an elevated freeway on the waterfront. Due to damage sustained during the 2001 Nisqually earthquake the viaduct was replaced by a tunnel. The 2-mile (3.2 km) Alaskan Way Viaduct replacement tunnel was originally scheduled to be completed in December 2015 at a cost of US$4.25 billion. The world's largest tunnel boring machine, named "Bertha", was commissioned for the project, measuring 57 feet (17 m) in diameter. The tunnel's opening was delayed to February 2019 due to issues with the machine, which included a two-year halt in excavation.

Seattle has started moving away from the automobile and toward mass transit. From 2004 to 2009, the annual number of unlinked public transportation trips increased by approximately 21%. In 2006, voters in King County passed the Transit Now proposition, which increased bus service hours on high ridership routes and paid for five limited-stop bus lines called RapidRide. After rejecting a roads and transit measure in 2007, Seattle-area voters passed a transit only measure in 2008 to increase ST Express bus service, extend the Link light rail system, and expand and improve Sounder commuter rail service.

A Link light rail line (now the 1 Line) from downtown heading south to Sea-Tac Airport began service in 2009, giving the city its first rapid transit line with intermediate stations within the city limits. The line was first extended north to the University of Washington in March 2016, followed by Northgate in October 2021, and Lynnwood in August 2024. A second line, the 2 Line opened in April 2024 between Bellevue and Redmond and was extended to Seattle in March 2026. The section between Seattle and Bellevue is the first railway to use a floating pontoon bridge. Voters in the Puget Sound region approved an additional tax increase, part of the Sound Transit 3 package, in November 2016 to expand light rail to West Seattle and Ballard as well as Tacoma, Everett, and Issaquah.

Seattle has scooter and bicycle-sharing systems operated by private companies (Wombi and Lime) who cooperate with the city government. A docked bikeshare system, Pronto Cycle Share, debuted in 2014 but was shut down in 2017 due to low ridership numbers. Later that year, the city government allowed privately operated dockless bicycles to operate within Seattle as a pilot. It was later made a permanent program with several competing companies; one used bikes with gears specifically chosen for Seattle's hilly terrain. Later developments included using exclusively e-bikes and e-scooters. A city-operated site tracks ridership and other details. (Note: The micromobility vendors are required to share ride date with the Seattle Department of Transportation (SDOT). This data is aggregated into a dashboard which provides data about trips, deployment, equity area deployment, relative ridership heat maps, and unique ridership.) In 2024, a total of 6.3 million trips on bikeshare and scootershare systems were taken in Seattle; there were also 163 serious injuries that year involving bikes and scooters.

=== Utilities ===
Water and electric power are municipal services, provided by Seattle Public Utilities and Seattle City Light, respectively. Private utility companies serving Seattle include Puget Sound Energy, which has 150,000 natural gas customers in the city, and Seattle Steam Company, which has a district heating system in Downtown Seattle powered by several steam plants. Curbside solid waste, recycling, and composting pickup is outsourced by Seattle Public Utilities to Waste Management, Inc and Recology. Non-garbage waste is processed by other companies; since 2015, curbside collection of food waste for composting in Seattle has been mandatory to offer to all households.

Lumen Technologies (formerly CenturyLink), Astound Broadband (formerly Wave Broadband), and Comcast are the primary providers of telephone, cable television, and Internet service in the city. CenturyLink stopped providing cable television service in 2021.

As of 2023, at least 88% of Seattle's electricity is produced using hydropower, with less than 40% of the hydroelectricity acquired via the Bonneville Power Administration. The remaining known electricity sources consist of wind power, nuclear power, and biogas; less than 2% comes from an unidentified source. Seattle Public Utilities manages two tap water supply systems on the Cedar River and Tolt River. These systems are fed by melted snowpack in the Cascade Mountains over the autumn and winter that fill reservoirs as they melt. Seattle's wastewater system includes 1,422 miles (2,288 km) of sewers that reach treatment plants that discharge into Puget Sound; a 485-mile (781 km) network of separate tunnels for stormwater serve other treatment facilities. Older areas of the city have a combined sewer system that dumps stormwater and untreated wastewater into Puget Sound during overflow events.

== Crime ==
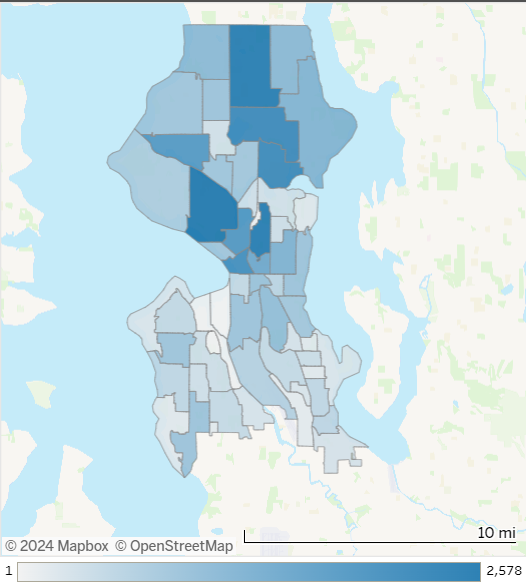
A 2023 map of recorded crimes in each Seattle neighborhood

In 2023, Seattle had 5,000 violent crimes. From 2013 to 2018 there was a slow increase in crimes. The crime rate dipped in 2020, before increasing in 2021 and 2022. In 2023, Seattle had a violent crime rate of 683 per 100,000 people, and 5,174 property crimes per 100,000 people.

Overall crimes per capita in Seattle decreased slightly during the beginning of the 21st century. While the total number of crimes rose, the population of the city grew faster. For the data below, per-capita estimates yield the following: 6,744 crimes per 100,000 people for 2008–2009, 6,725 crimes per 100,000 people for 2010–2019, and 6,325 crimes per 100,000 people for 2020–2024. (Note: These figures are not an accurate reflection of the actual rate of criminality; repeat offenders will further reduce these rates.) These percentages are overestimates due to the sample rate of the census: city crime statistics are updated yearly, but city population figures are only updated once per decade.

Crimes in Seattle
Year	Violent crimes	Property crimes	Total	Pop. est.
2008	3,301	33,542	36,843	563,374
2009	3,672	35,476	39,148	563,374
2010	3,293	33,736	37,029	608,660
2011	3,357	32,503	35,860	608,660
2012	3,580	32,598	36,178	608,660
2013	3,564	37,168	40,732	608,660
2014	3,783	41,029	44,812	608,660
2015	3,831	38,191	42,022	608,660
2016	4,060	38,999	43,059	608,660
2017	4,395	38,625	43,020	608,660
2018	4,804	39,356	44,160	608,660
2019	4,701	37,792	42,493	608,660
2020	4,507	38,903	43,410	737,015
2021	5,428	42,600	48,028	737,015
2022	5,642	44,428	50,070	737,015
2023	5,333	40,387	45,720	737,015
2024	5,392	40,481	45,873	737,015

== International relations ==
Seattle has the following sister cities:

- Beersheba, Israel
- Bergen, Norway
- Cebu City, Philippines
- Chongqing, China
- Christchurch, New Zealand
- Daejeon, South Korea
- (Republic of Ireland) Galway, Ireland
- Gdynia, Poland
- Haiphong, Vietnam
- Kaohsiung, Taiwan
- Kobe, Japan
- Limbe, Cameroon
- Mombasa, Kenya
- Nantes, France
- Pécs, Hungary
- Perugia, Italy
- Reykjavík, Iceland
- Sihanoukville, Cambodia
- Surabaya, Indonesia
- Tashkent, Uzbekistan

== See also ==
- List of people from Seattle
- List of songs about Seattle
- List of television shows set in Seattle
- Seattle Commune in the Soviet Union
- USS Seattle—two ships

== Bibliography ==
- Jones, Nard (1972). Seattle. New York: Doubleday. ISBN 978-0-385-01875-3.
- Morgan, Murray (1982) [1951]. Skid Road: an Informal Portrait of Seattle (revised and updated, first illustrated ed.). Seattle and London: University of Washington Press. ISBN 978-0-295-95846-0.
- Ochsner, Jeffrey Karl, ed. (1998) [1994]. Shaping Seattle Architecture: A Historical Guide to the Architects. Seattle and London: University of Washington Press. ISBN 978-0-295-97366-1.
- Sale, Roger (1976). Seattle: Past to Present. Seattle and London: University of Washington Press. ISBN 978-0-295-95615-2.
- Speidel, William C. (1978). Doc Maynard: The Man Who Invented Seattle. Seattle: Nettle Creek Publishing Company. pp. 196–197, 200. ISBN 978-0-914890-02-7.
- Speidel, William C. (1967). Sons of the profits; or, There's no business like grow business: the Seattle story, 1851–1901. Seattle: Nettle Creek Publishing Company. pp. 196–197, 200. ISBN 978-0-914890-00-3.
