= Theodore Peiser =

American photographer (1853–1922)

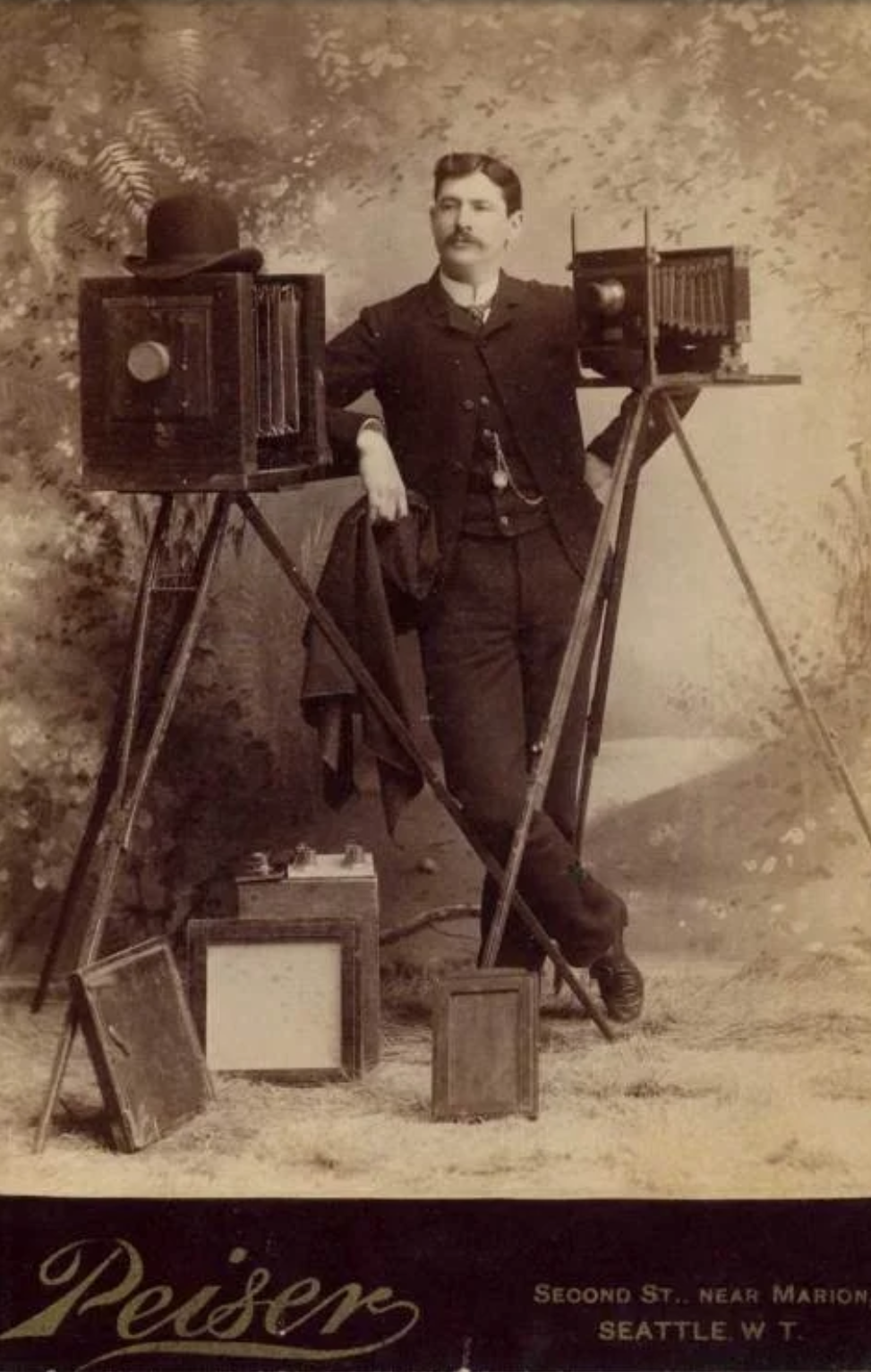
Self-portrait

Theodore E. Peiser (1853 - 1922) was an early photographer in Seattle, Washington and the Pacific Northwest. His studio and many of his photographs were lost in the Great Seattle Fire of 1889. His surviving photographs include one of the few photographs of the Seattle skyline from Beacon Hill before the fire as well as the Yesler-Leary Building in 1885, several years before it burned in the fire. He also captured the first and second Occidental Hotel buildings that preceded the Seattle Hotel and Sinking Ship. He also documented the debut of the first Seattle Street Railway horse-drawn streetcar in 1884 with mayor John Leary.

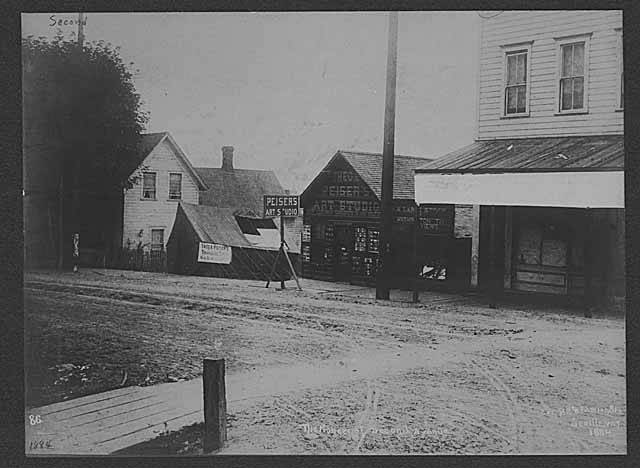
Peiser studio (dark building in center) and tent in 1884

Peiser photographed the memorial service for assassinated U.S. president James Garfield held in Occidental Square in front of the Occidental Hotel on September 27, 1881. He also captured the territory's legislators in 1883.

Peiser photographed the Washington Husky football team in 1900, not long after statehood and the school's transition from being Territorial University of Washington. He also photographed Arthur A. Denny and a then elderly pioneer Carson D. Boren. He captured images of the area's legislators, such as Samuel H. Piles addressing a crowd at the dedication of the Alki Point Monument, and Henry Yesler and his wife, Sarah.

Peiser photographed groups of students and faculty at the Territorial University (predecessor of University of Washington). His images also included Soapy Smith.

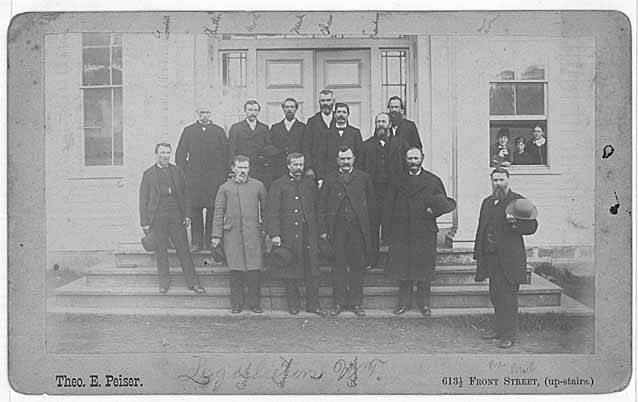
Territorial legislators in 1883

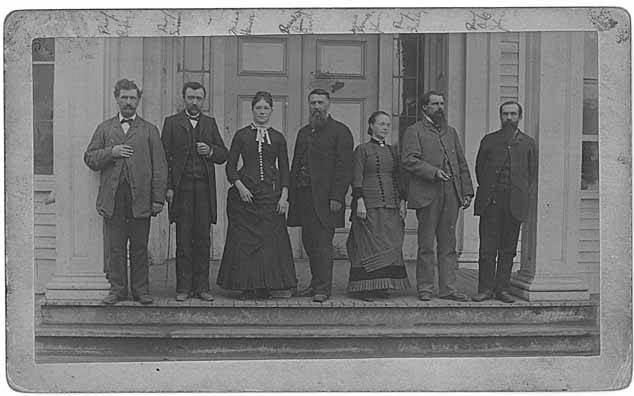
Territorial University faculty in 1883

Peiser photographed sights at Alki Point including bathers at Alki Beach and the Stockade Hotel on the day a pioneer monument (Alki Point Monument) was being dedicated. He also photographed firemen and community leaders such as businessmen.

Peiser lived at 7543 Sunnyside Avenue in Seattle. After the fire and its devastation to his business, he fell ill. His doctor advised him to move to California, and he planned to sell off his remaining photographic works and equipment.

Peiser moved to California in 1907. He died there in 1922.

== Writings and testimony ==
Peiser included poetry in his newspaper advertisement. He wrote a July 1, 1919 column in The Evening News (San Jose) about Emerson P. Harris' book Cooperation and the hope of the consumer about combating high prices. Peiser testified about the immigration of Japanese people to San Francisco in a congressional committee hearing in 1921. He recalled his time in Hawaii from 1879 until 1880 during the hearing and expressed fears about the immigration of Japanese people.

== Work ==
His work includes cabinet photos.

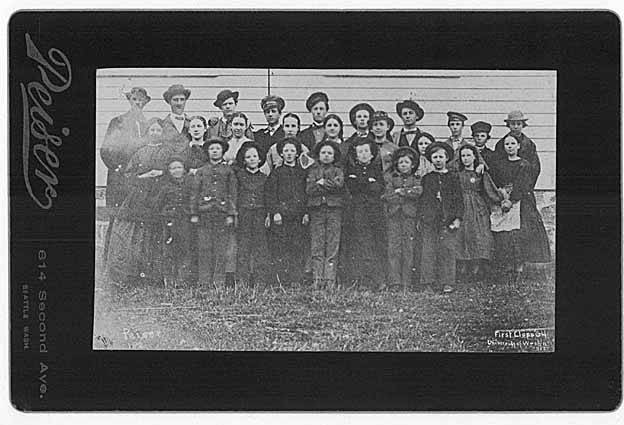
Territorial University of Washington students

A collection of his photographs is held by the University of Washington.

== Gallery ==
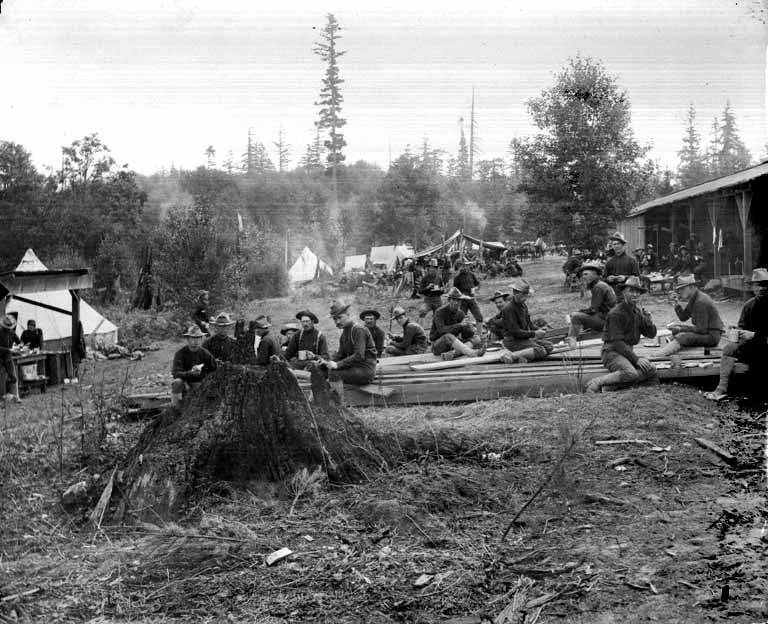
Soldiers at Fort Lawton

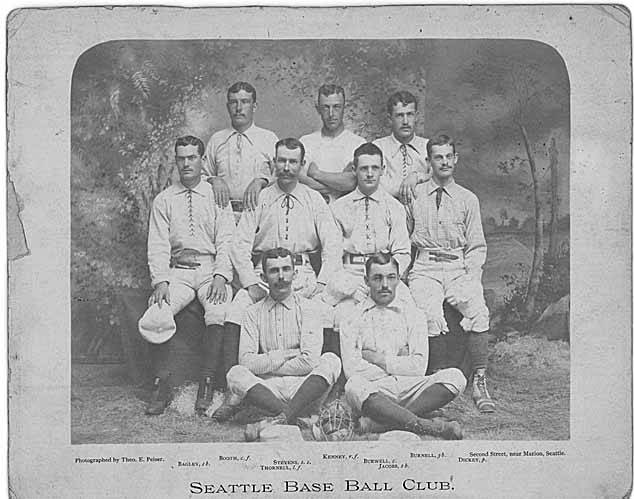
Seattle Bank baseball team

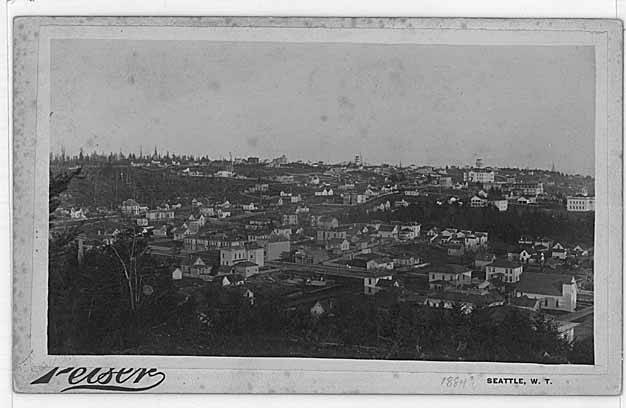
Bird's eye view of Seattle looking east

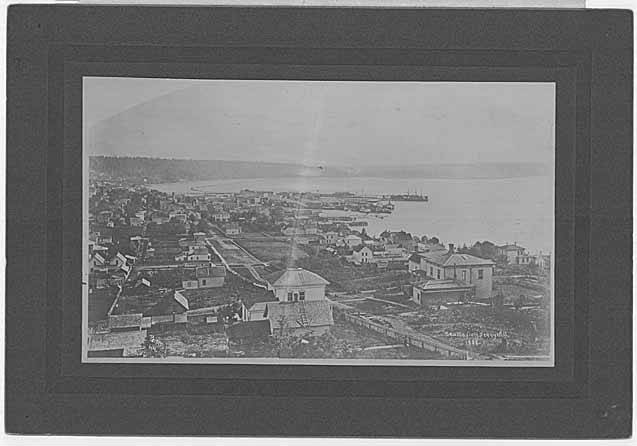
View of Seattle from Denny Hill in 1882

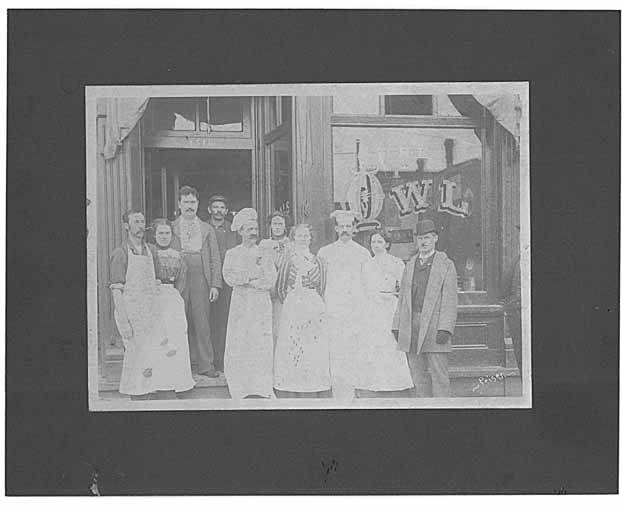
In front of The Owl

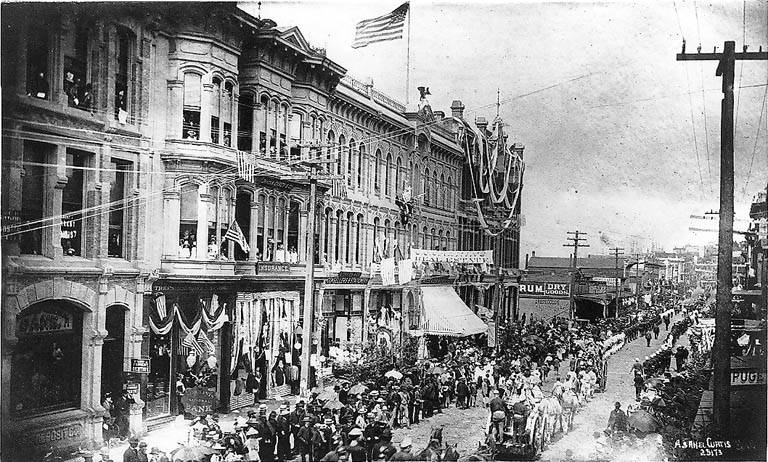
1888 Fourth of July Parade on First Avenue

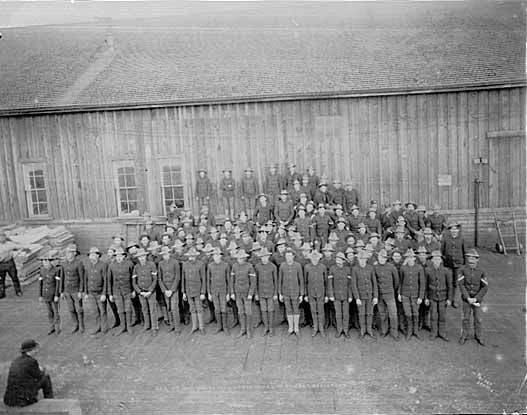
Soldiers preparing to go to China in 1900 (Boxer Rebellion)

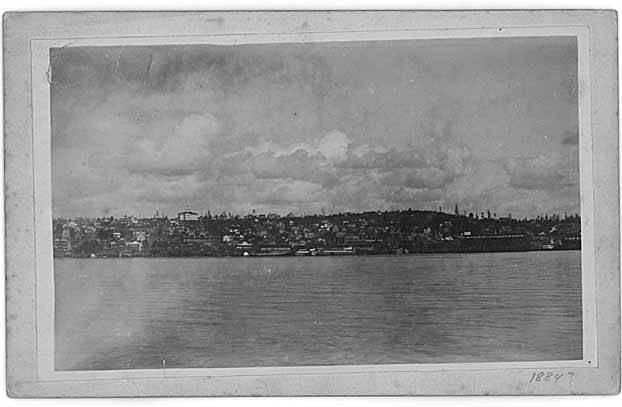
Seattle waterfront north from King St from Elliott Bay

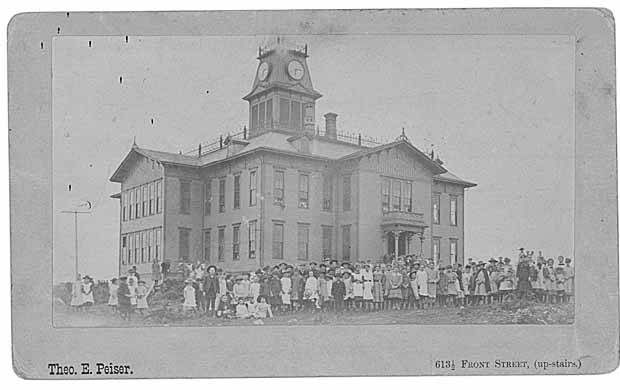
Central School and students in 1884

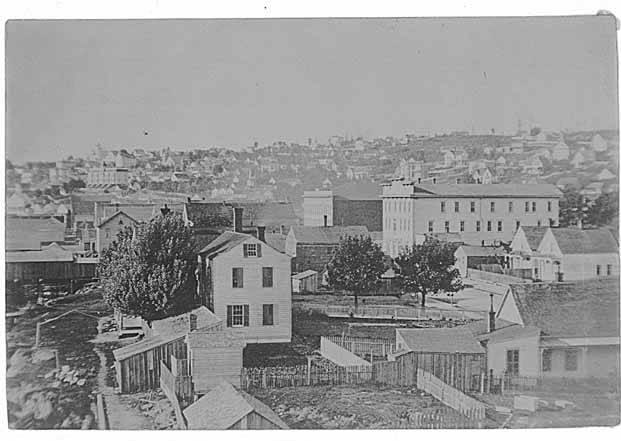
Looking northeast from King Street and Western Avenue (1881)

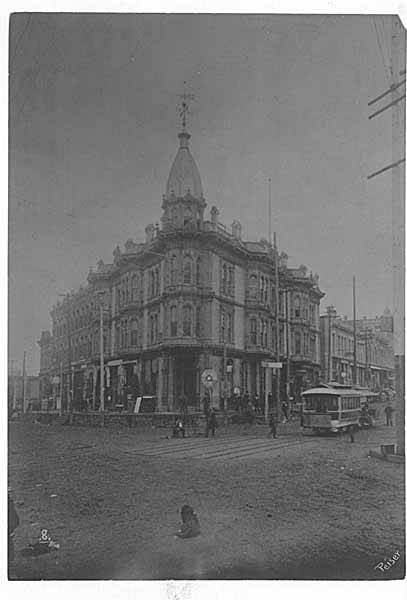
Yesler-Leary Building

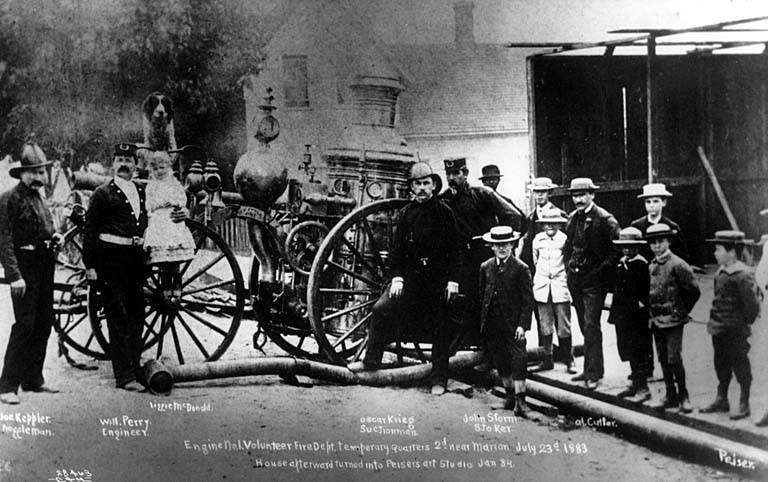
Seattle Volunteer Fire Company engine Number 1 in 1883 at the engine house on Columbia Street

== See also ==
- Edward Sheriff Curtis
- Asahel Curtis
