= Alki Point, Seattle =

Alki sbaqʷabqs
- Seattle Neighborhood
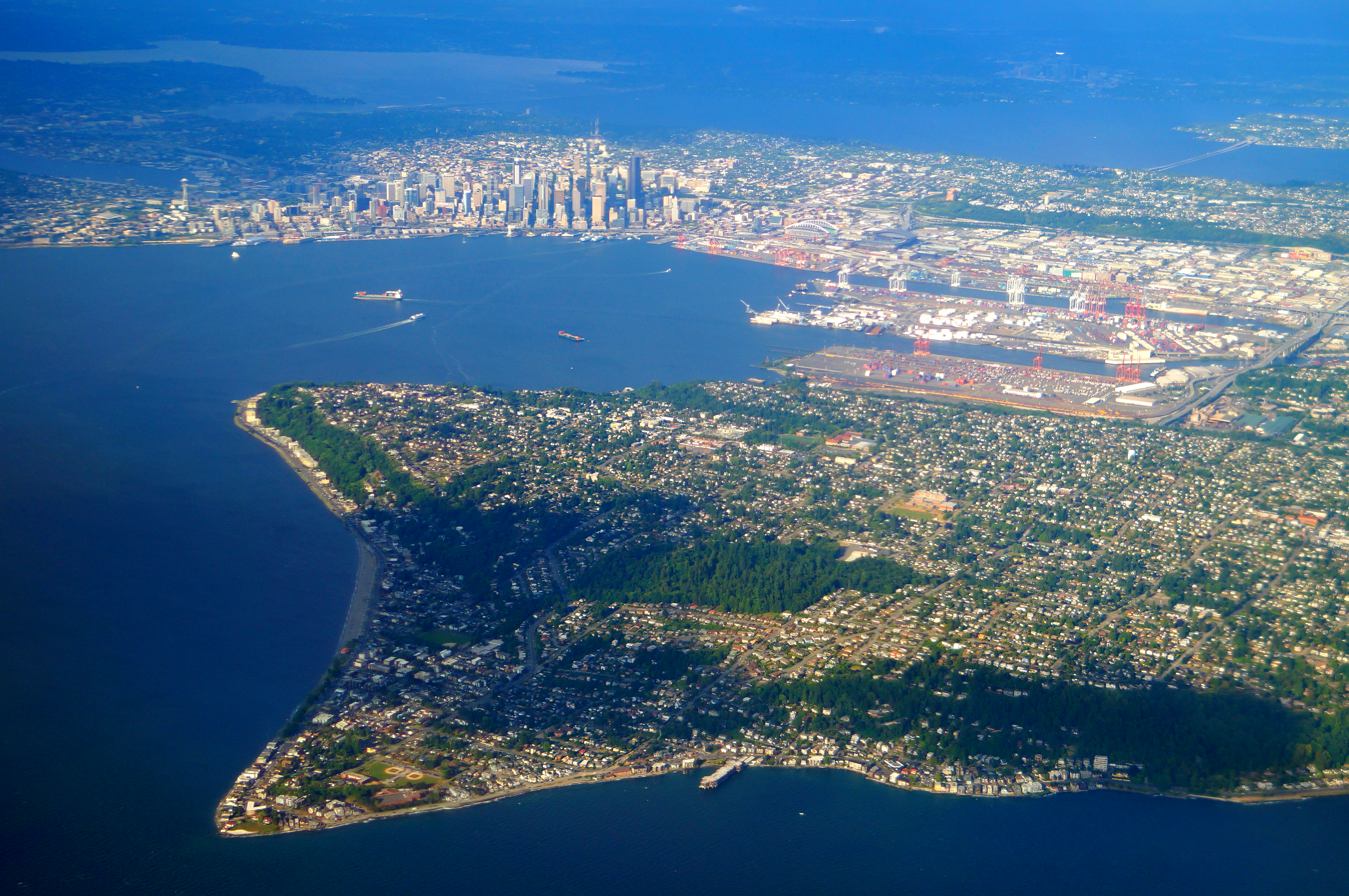
- Aerial view of Alki Point in Seattle. Elliott Bay and Downtown Seattle can be seen in the background.

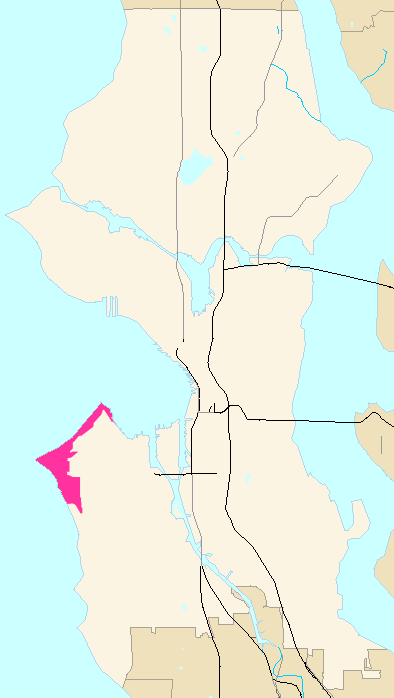
- The Alki region of West Seattle
- Country: United States
- State: Washington
- County: King County, Washington

Alki Point (/ˈælkaɪ/, Lushootseed: sbaqʷabqs, lit. 'prairie point') is a neighborhood in western Seattle, Washington. It is a point jutting into Puget Sound, the westernmost landform in the city's West Seattle district. Alki is the peninsular neighborhood on Alki Point. Alki was the original settlement in what was to become the city of Seattle. It was part of the city of West Seattle from 1902 until that city's annexation by Seattle in 1907.

The Alki neighborhood extends along the shore from the point, both southeast and northeast. To the northeast it continues past Alki Beach roughly to Duwamish Head, the northernmost point of West Seattle.

Alki Point also marks the southern extent of Elliott Bay; a line drawn northwest to West Point marks the division between bay and sound.

== Etymology ==
The name "Alki" is a Chinook Jargon word meaning "by and by" or "eventually". It is a shortened version of the original name, "New York Alki." The name "New York" may have been chosen because it was the state of origin of several of the settlers.

In the Lushootseed language, the name of the point is sbaqʷabqs, meaning "prairie point."

Other names in English for the point include Battery Point, Me-Kwah-Mooks Point, and Roberts Point.

== History ==
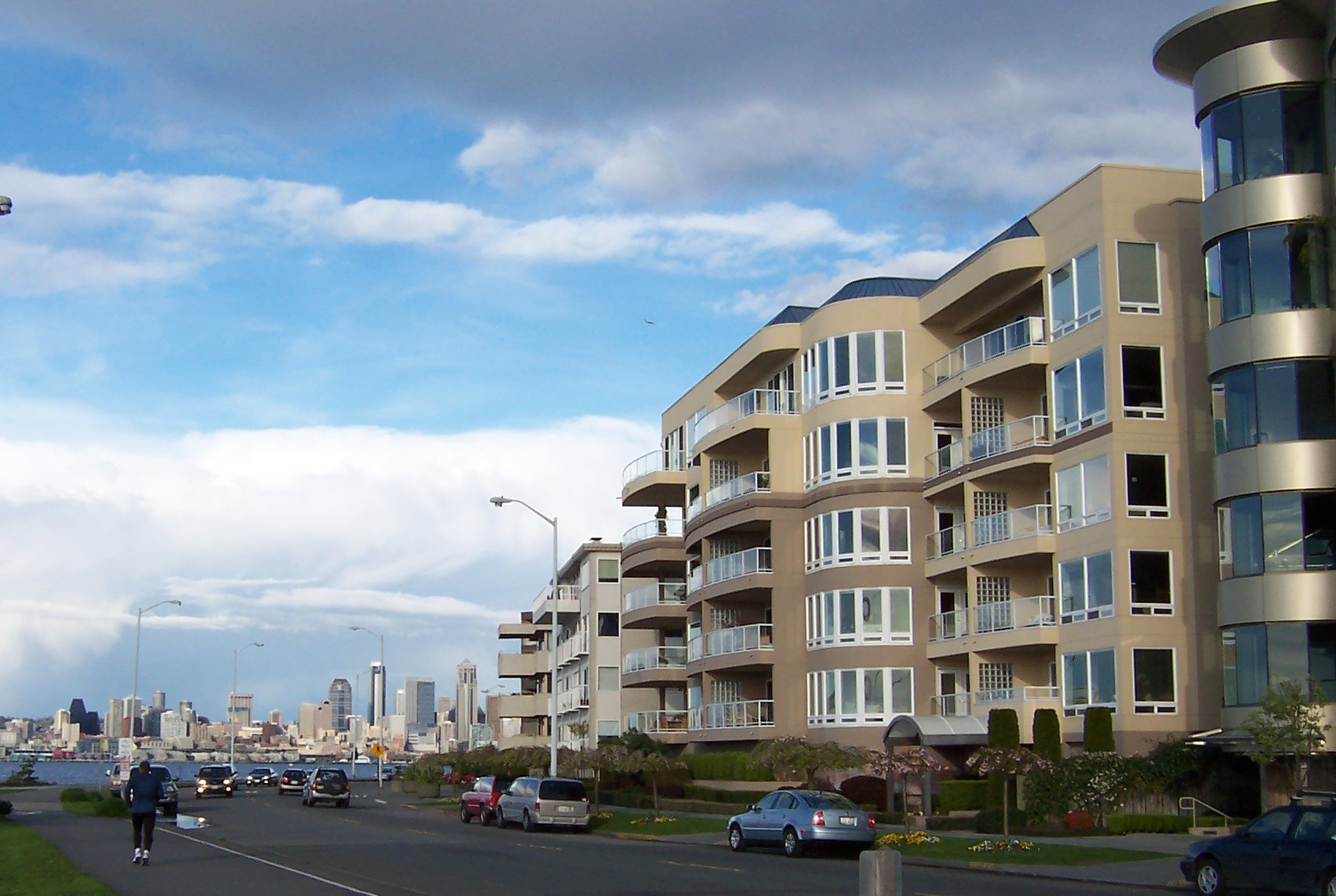
Alki marina waterfront with downtown Seattle in the background

Prior to American settlement, the Duwamish people used the area for cultivating and gathering at nearby prairies. They were maintained through seasonal burning.

The Denny Party landed at Alki Point November 13, 1851, and platted a settlement of six blocks of eight lots, calling the settlement "New York Alki". However, the next April, Arthur A. Denny abandoned the site at Alki for a better-situated site on the east shore of Elliott Bay, just north of the plat of David Swinson "Doc" Maynard. This site is now known as Pioneer Square.

Charles C. Terry, who owned the land, and some others held on at Alki for a while, but most eventually joined the others in Pioneer Square. Terry gave his claim to Maynard in 1857 in exchange for his Pioneer Square holdings; Maynard farmed the land for 11 years and sold it to Hans Martin Hanson and Knud Olson in 1868, Hanson taking possession of the point itself.

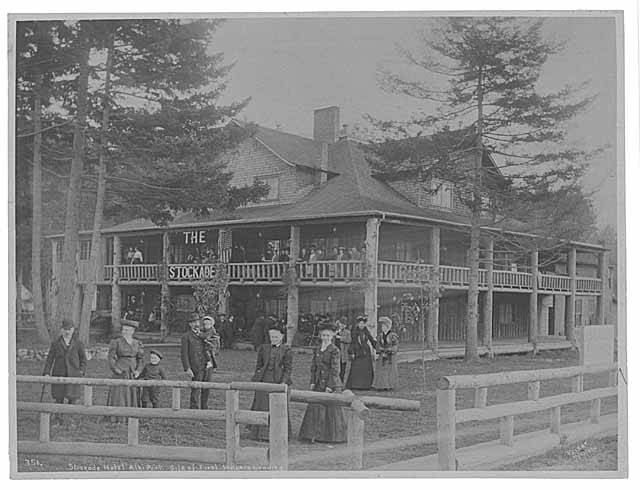
Theodore Peiser's photo of the Stockade Hotel on November 13, 1905

The Stockade Hotel was photographed by early Seattle photographers Asahel Curtis and Theodore Peiser.

The Alki Point Lighthouse dates from 1913, replacing the United States Lighthouse Service's post light from 1887 and Hanson's lantern-on-a-post from the mid-1870s.

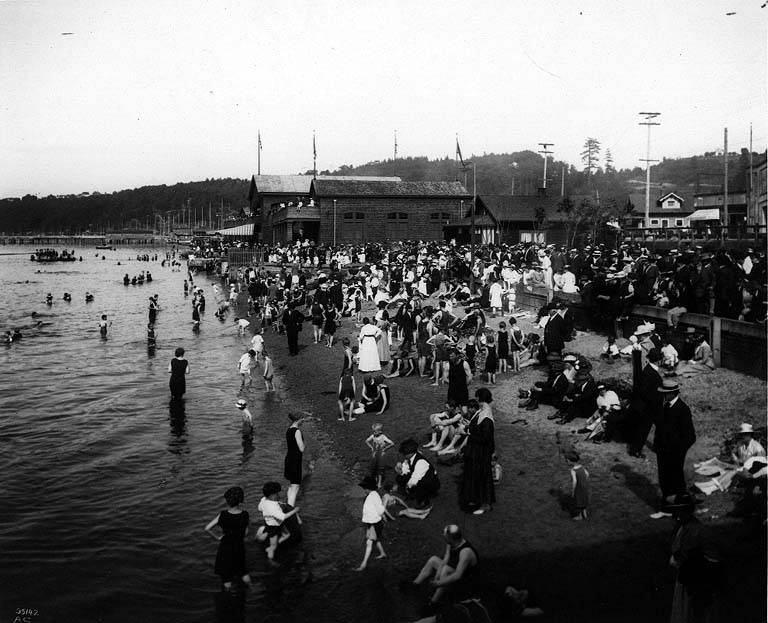
Alki Point bathing beach, 1930, by Asahel Curtis

From 1925 to 1936, a ferry route across Puget Sound connected Alki Point with Manchester, Washington on the Kitsap Peninsula.

Well into the 20th century, Alki was reachable from most of Seattle only by boat. Alki today is reminiscent of a Pacific Northwest beach town, with a mix of mid-century bungalows, medium-rise waterfront apartment houses, waterfront businesses, a thin beach, and a road with a bike/foot trail running several miles along the water. This section of West Seattle is bounded on the northwest by Elliott Bay; on the southwest by Puget Sound; and on the east by the West Seattle hill. Its main thoroughfares are Alki Avenue S.W. (northeast- and southwest-bound); Beach Drive S.W. (northwest- and southeast-bound); and S.W. Admiral Way (east- and westbound).

There have been summer concerts at Alki Beach since the early 1900s; the original streetcars to West Seattle were established in order to bring people to these events. Today, the beach plays host to the Seattle Music Fest every August, a three-day music festival that plays host to emerging Northwest artists and selected national and international headliners.

The Birthplace of Seattle Monument is located at Alki Beach. It has the names of the first Seattle colony listed on it. The third side of the monument gives the names of the adult men composing the first Seattle Colony: "Arthur A. Denny and his Wife. John N. Low and Wife. Carson D. Boren and Wife. David D. Denny. Charles C. Terry", and on the base, "New York Alki (By and By)", the name first given the settlement. The fourth side says "Erected by the Washington University State Historical Society, 13 November 1905", and on the base, "Presented by Lenora Denny."

== Geology ==
Just inland from the point is a small hill of about 75 feet (23 m). This hill is one of the Seattle area's few bedrock outcroppings, and possibly the only one outside of the Duwamish River valley. It constitutes a piece of the 23-million-year-old sedimentary Blakeley Formation. It is believed to have once formed a sea stack, though it is possible that it was always connected to the mainland by a tombolo.

== Tourism ==
=== Alki Beach ===
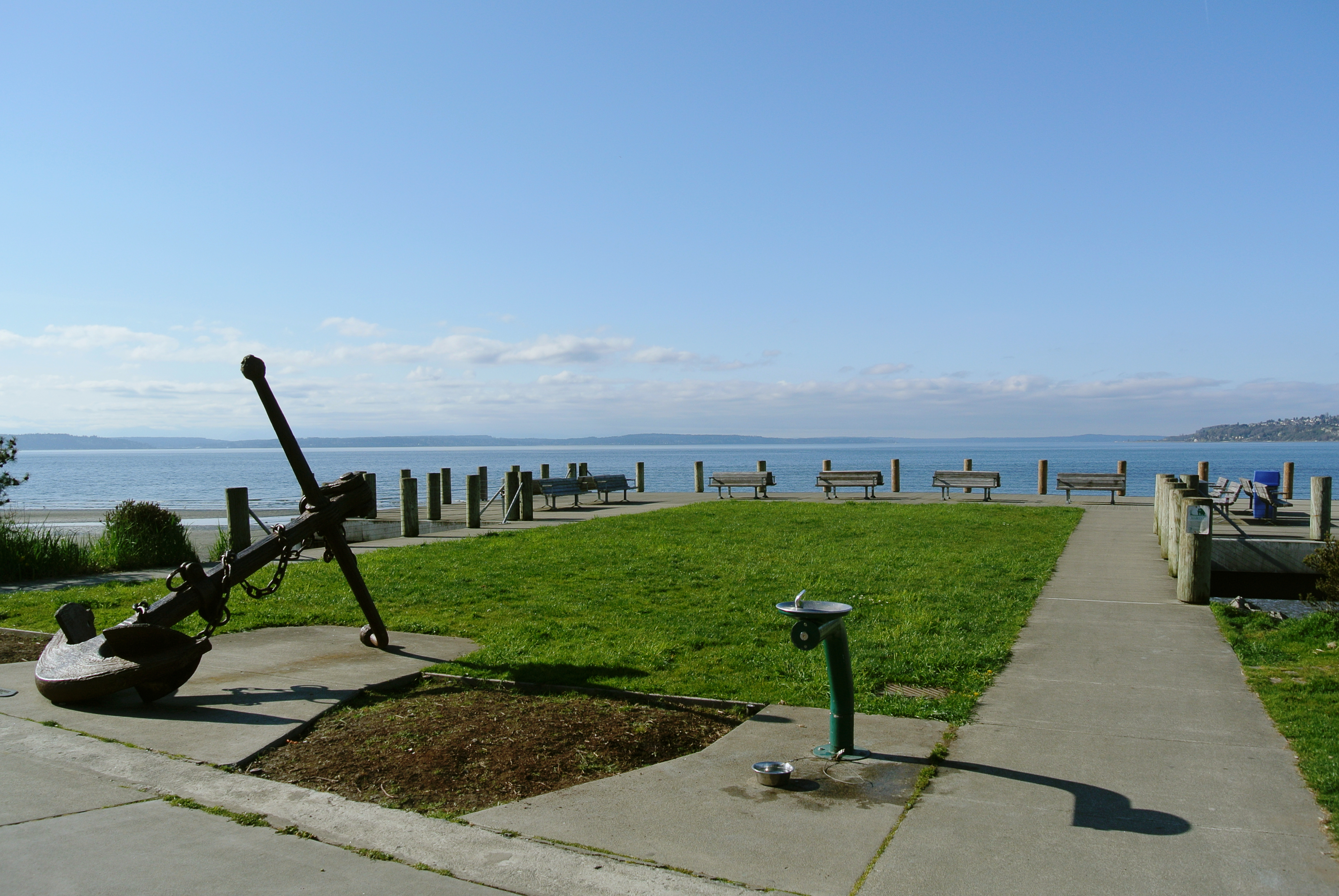
Duwamish Head, at the eastern end of Alki Beach

Alki Beach is the principal tourist attraction at Alki Point. It features sand, saltwater, bungalows, and local restaurants. It is generally not a popular swimming beach, owing to the cold waters of Puget Sound. It overlooks the Olympic Mountains and downtown Seattle from all points. There is access for wheelchair users and roller-skaters. In the summer months, Alki Beach becomes crowded, especially on weekends. Alki Beach is also famed for its biking and walking trail, which provides a view of nearby Blake Island. Tourist attractions include the miniature of the Statue of Liberty, the iconic Alki Point Lighthouse and the Birthplace of Seattle monument which also includes a tribute to the Indigenous Duwamish people without whom the first settlers would not have thrived. The main commercial strip in West Seattle, uphill from Alki Beach, California Ave SW provides five-and-dime shops and diners that recall earlier decades.

=== Landmarks ===
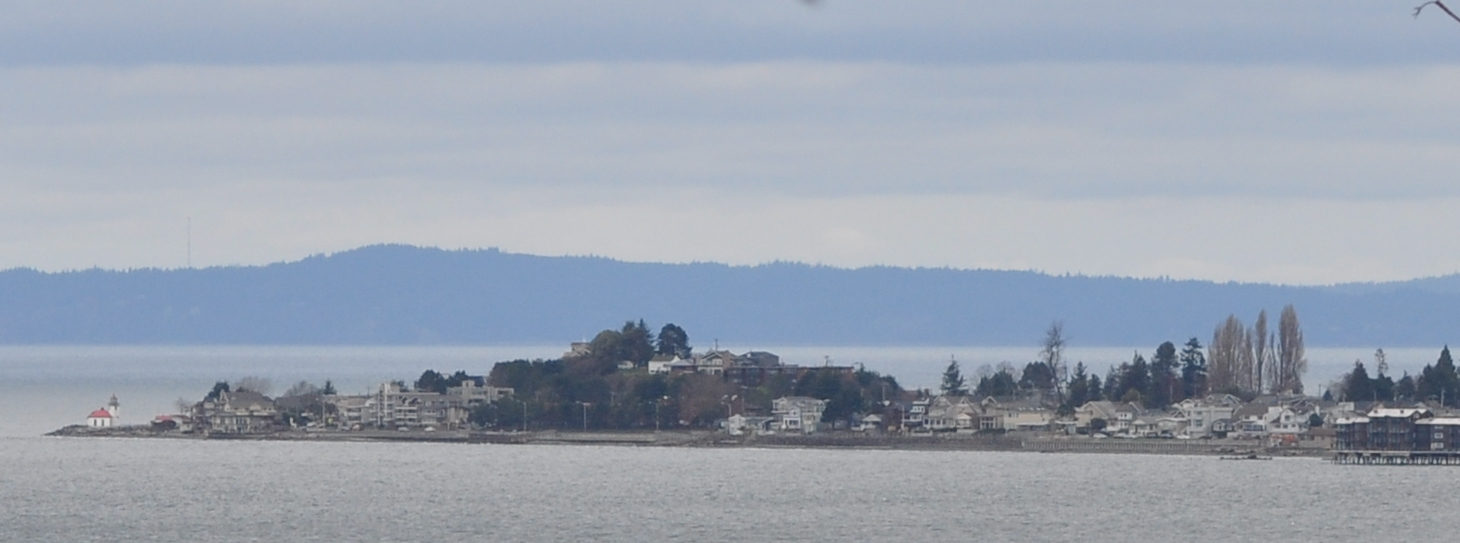
Alki Point, seen from Lincoln Park

Alki Point Lighthouse is a historic landmark built in 1913 that still functions today. Though the property is not open to the public, the tower is available for touring on summer weekend afternoons when the lens can be viewed.

A scale replica of the Statue of Liberty at Alki Beach was donated by Reginald H. Parsons and the Seattle Area Council of The Boy Scouts of America in 1952. The statue may allude to "New York-Alki", the name of the 1851 settlement at Alki (see above). Many tourists mourned the September 11, 2001 terrorist attacks on the World Trade Center at the site.

=== Music ===
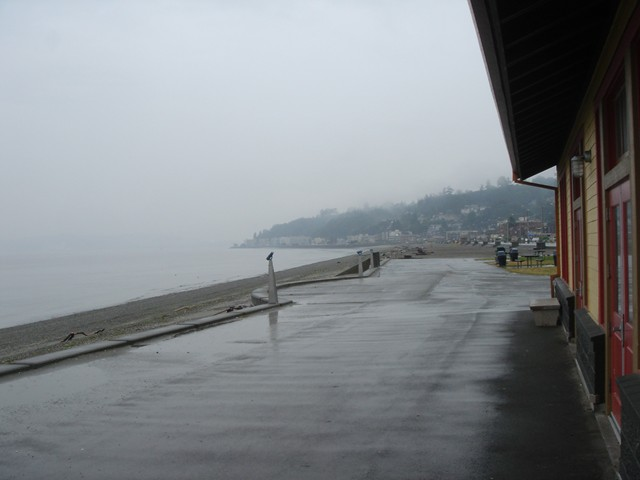
Alki Beach on a rainy day

Alki Beach has been a venue for summer concerts every August since the early 20th century. The local music scene draws tourists and locals alike. Live music can also be found at Kenyon Hall which features a Wurlitzer theater organ. The Historic Admiral Theater also presents live performances on occasion.

=== Holdouts and historic buildings ===
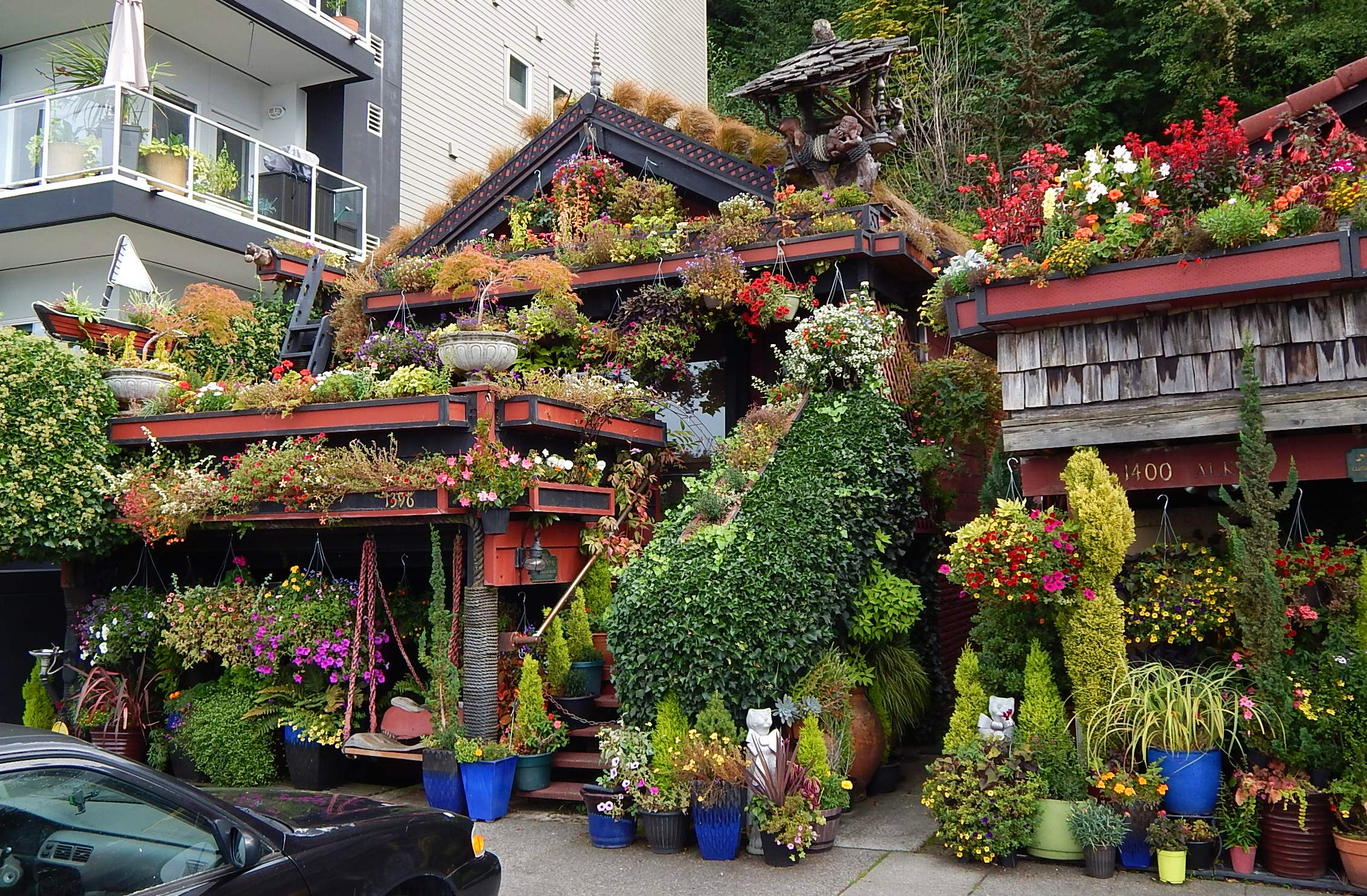
The Alki Flower Houses

Bungalows are nestled between condominiums along Harbor Avenue. These historic homes, such as the Hanson-Olsen Home, originally built in the 1860s, provide a glimpse into the Arts and Crafts movement which flourished in the cities of the American West in the late nineteenth and early twentieth centuries. Many of these bungalows are today in poor condition, and residents have been increasingly forced to renovate or move them to another destination, or risk demolition.

The row of condominiums facing Alki Beach is interrupted by a pair of holdout beach homes. These houses have been heavily decorated with flowers since 1989, and are registered as a wildlife habitat by the National Wildlife Federation.

=== Parks ===
Hamilton Viewpoint Park, founded in 1954, provides a view of Elliott Bay. This park is located above Alki Beach on California Avenue SW. There are benches and lawn suitable for picnics and resting. Within the Alki neighborhood is Schmitz Park, one of the only old-growth forest in Seattle. Other parks in the Alki neighborhood: Me-Kwa-Mooks, Constellation Park and Marine Reserve, Whale Tail Park, Alki Playground, Bar-S Baseball Field. Alki Beach is also a city park.

== See also ==
- History of Seattle before 1900
