= Camp Bonaparte =

Scouting America camp in Washington, US

- Bonaparte Lake, with Camp Bonaparte on north shore
- Owner: Chief Seattle Council
- Location: Bonaparte Lake, Washington
- Country: United States
- Coordinates: 48.8066°N 119.0485°W
- Camp size: 105 acres (42 ha)
- Founded: 1958
- Founder: North-Central Washington Council
- Website campreservation.com/609/Camps/1042

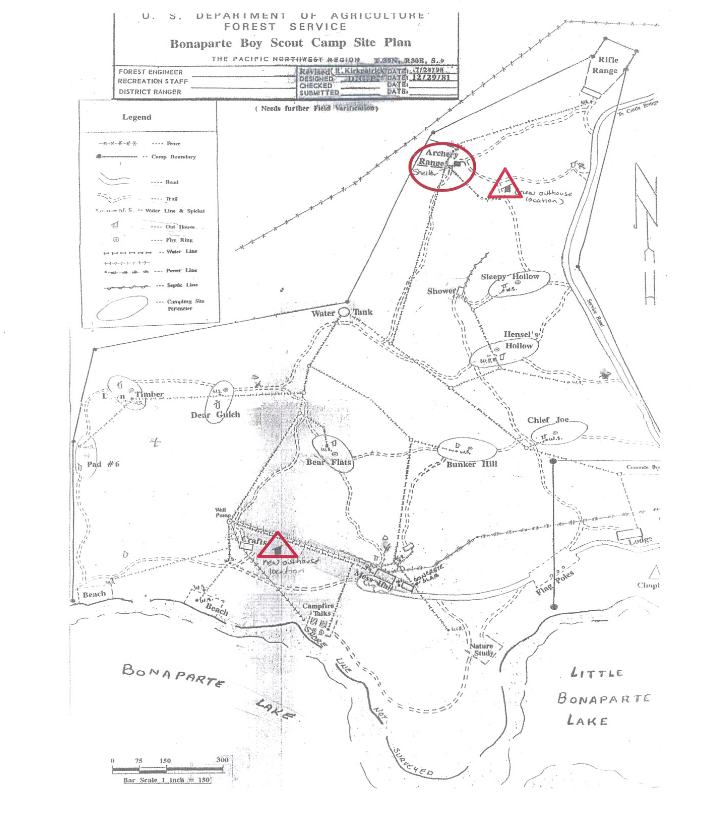
Line map of camp c. 2016, proposed upgrade sites outlined in red

Camp Bonaparte is an approximately 80 acres (32 ha) Scouting America camp located near Wauconda, Washington, United States on the northern shore of Bonaparte Lake and at the foot of Mount Bonaparte. While it is located in northeastern Washington, it is under the ownership and management of the Chief Seattle Council, based in Seattle, Washington. The camp was first founded and run by the North-Central Washington Boy Scouts Council, later renamed the Grand Columbia Council. In 2023 ownership of the camp was transferred when the Grand Columbia Council officially merged into the larger Chief Seattle Council.

A thunderstorm in 2012 felled a number of trees in the camp damaging the crafts and historic kitchen/commissary buildings. While the crafts building was saved, the kitchen/commissary building was deemed a loss and a replacement was built on its foundation in 2014. In 2016 a new teaching and storage building was built on the original archery range site, while two new vault toilets were also installed.

Several large wildfires have threatened the camp since its founding, notably the 1973 Bonaparte Lake Fire and the 2021 Walker Creek and Spur Fire complex which burned over similar areas of the region surrounding the camp property.

== Access and visitation ==
The southern end of Lake Bonaparte is 5.7 mi (9.2 km) north of SR 20 on County Road #4953 which then transitions to Forest service road 32. The road runs along the eastern shore of the lake and provides access to private residences and the lakes area north of Bonaparte.

Four year visitation averages were presented in the 1997 environmental impact statement accompanying the Crown Jewel Mine project for a number of sites in the Bonaparte area. Based on forest service data from the early 1990s, Camp Bonaparte experienced visitations by 900 people a year on average, with a cumulative 5,300 visit days. A visit day was defined as 12 visit hours in total but not needing to happen as single duration visit.

Camp Bonaparte is one of three private camp properties within immediate area. The Kiwanis Internationals Camp Tokiwanee and the Lutheran Church Missouri Synods Camp Ortoha are both located north of Camp Bonaparte on the northern end of Lost Lake. Based on the Crown Jewel visitation statistics, Camp Bonaparte was the smallest of the three camps, with Camp Tokiwanee receiving 1,600 visits, and Camp Ortoha 1,100 visits over the same time frame.

== Ownership ==
Recreation use for Bonaparte Lake were formalized in the 1930s with the Forest Service announcing a comprehensive recreation plan for the area surrounding the lake. The plan called for the construction of a national forest campground, a public resort area, a guard station, private summer homes, and reserving an area for a scouting-type camp. The site which would become Camp Bonaparte was leased from the national forest on January 1, 1958 by the North-Central Washington Scout Council. The lease was issued as a special use permit with a duration of 20 years. During the early 1990's the North-Central Washington Council merged with the Fort Simcoe Area Council based in Yakima. The two smaller councils officially merged in April 1992 to form the Grand Columbia Council.

By 2011, the Grand Columbia Council was in financial distress. Due to required updates to the scout lodge and property at its Camp Fife retreat in 2005, the council was around $1.6 million in debt. In attempt to remedy the debt, a group of property lots were put up for sale across the council district, including a 22 acres (8.9 ha) lot at Camp Bonaparte. The asking price for property was given as $105,000. The council was hoping to have the debt paid off by the end of 2011, but they needed to make progress or they could face restructuring or dissolution.

Twelve years later the Grand Columbia Council was formally absorbed by the Chief Seattle Council in April 2023. The former council was reorganized into three service districts, the Simcoe Mountains, Basalt Coulee, and Highlands. Most of the former North-Central Washington/Grand Columbia council properties were added to the Chief Seattle properties who maintains them as of 2026, including Camp Bonaparte.

== History ==
Commissary-kitchen building after the August 2013 wind event

The original 1958 use-permit area is a triangular section of lake front property encompassing 25 acres (10 ha). Plans at the time were to develop the area as a wilderness camp and not a lodge style retreat, with a focus on use of supplies that could be packed in or foraged from the area. Early planning included the water supply, toilets, showers, and swimming equipment plus lake float. Also possibly to be built would be a storage facility. Camp Bonaparte was opened in 1958 as wilderness facility, with a series of separate sites large enough for a troop each. Water was piped into each site while food was housed and provided by a commissary with refrigerator. The water line to the camp was installed in June of 1959 by a volunteer scout team, with a plastic pipe buried 9 inches below ground. Another team oversaw the installation of the refrigerator, donated by the Chelan Rotary Club, and which had formerly seen use on a Lake Chelan barge travelling between Chelan, Washington and the Holden mine landing.

A funding committee was created by the Council in early 1961 with the goal of raising funds for new buildings at camps owned by the council. In addition to a winter lodge for Scout-A-Vista west of Wenatchee, a services building was deemed needed for Camp Bonaparte which was considered a needed improvement for several years already. The fundraising was expected to be targeted across the five counties then covered by the council rather than a general public campaign. A goal of $15,800 (equivalent to about $170,200 in 2025) was placed to cover costs for both buildings. By late 1962 the main commissary/kitchen building had been constructed at the camp, and was in full use for the 1963 scouting year. Summer programs at the camp in 1962 included an aquatics program with swimming, rowing, and sailing. Shooting in the rifle range was very popular. In line with the initial plan, the visiting troops tent camped, and did all the meal preparation themselves. The camp was the most popular of the scout camps for the council, with total visit numbers of 21 troops and 311 scouts. In 1969 funding was sought to upgrade and expand two camps in Okanogan County by the Council, with plans to raise $35,500 (equivalent to about $311,700 in 2025) which would be split between Summit Camp on the Colville Indian Reservation, and Camp Bonaparte. The Bonaparte funds would be used to construct six additional camp sites on lands leased from the both the National Forest and a private timber company. Also planned were expanded sanitation facilities, an equipment building and a headquarters building.

On August 29, 2013 heavy winds from a strong thunderstorm passing over the Okanogan Highlands hit Bonaparte Lake. Wind gusts from the storm and another one week later were estimated to have reached 60–80 mph (97–129 km/h) and felled over 100 trees within the greater camp grounds while damaging another 20-35. One tree fall badly damaged the kitchen and commissary building while another hit the crafts building. While the crafts building was repairable, the commissary was deemed a total loss. The Council requested permission from the Okanogan-Wenatchee National Forest to remove the old building and build a modern facility on the same foundations. The request was granted in 2014. In May 2016, the Grand Columbia Council applied for another building permit at the camp, with the goal of building a new pole barn over the existing archery site, and digging two new vault toilets. The request was reviewed and approved in August of that year and an estimated start time was given for September.

== Wildfires ==
The greater Bonaparte area was threatened by a wildfire during the summer of 1973 started on a hill near Camp Bonaparte. The fire was first spotted on July 30th and grew to about 200 acres (81 ha) in size by July 31 with state and federal fire fighting crews working to manage it. Efforts at containment on August 1 were deemed a failure as southerly winds drove the flames northwards towards the Lost Lake area. Over the course of that morning over 10,000 US gal (38,000 L) of retardant had been dropped but due to the extremely dry conditions, the fire jumped multiple attempts at fire-lines. The fire caused evacuations in the Bonaparte region, including summer camps to the north of the Mountain at lost Lake, but did not impact the community of Havillah to the west. It was estimated the fire was fully surrounded by the evening of August 1, and crews were transitioning to mop up work within the fire perimeter. The fire line reached within .5 mi (0.80 km) of the camp border before finally being checked.

Camp Bonaparte was again threatened in 2021 when the Walker Creek Complex, including the smaller Spur Fire burned over portions of Mount Bonaparte and neighboring mountains, encompassing around 23,765 acres (9,617 ha). Started in early August by lightning, the Spur fire had grown to 50 acres (20 ha) when Okanogan County Emergency Management issued a level 3 evacuation order for the Mount Bonaparte area, just south of Bonaparte Lake north to Lost Lake. The evacuation perimeter was expanded on August 14 due to the combined area of the Walker and Spur fires with a total of over 3,000 acres (1,200 ha) having burned by that date. An evacuation center had been set up in Tonasket to help evacuees of the area.
