= Schooner Exact =

Ship

History

United States
- Name: Exact

The schooner Exact was the ship that delivered the Denny Party to Alki Point on November 13, 1851, which marked the founding of the city of Seattle.
