= Statue of Liberty (Seattle) =

Statue in Seattle, Washington, U.S.

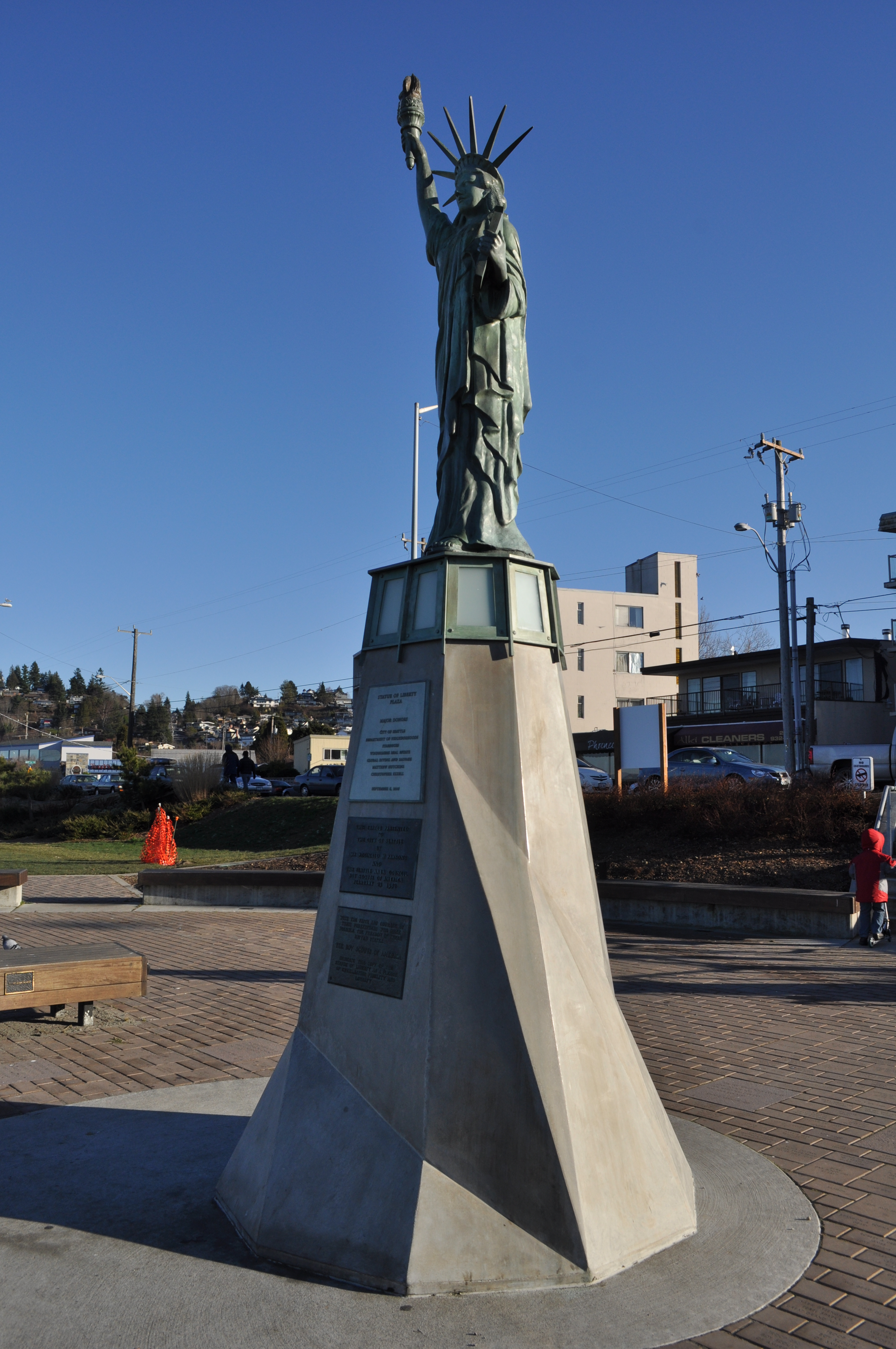
- The statue in 2011
- Year: 1952
- Medium: Bronze sculpture
- Dimensions: 230 cm (7.5 ft)
- Location: Seattle, Washington, United States; 47°34′45.7″N 122°24′38.3″W

The Statue of Liberty, or Lady Liberty, is a replica of New York City's Statue of Liberty (Liberty Enlightening the World) installed at Seattle's Alki Beach Park, in the U.S. state of Washington. It was installed in 1952 by the Boy Scouts of America and underwent a significant restoration in 2007 after repeated vandalism had damaged the sculpture.

== Description and history ==
The sculpture was donated to the city by the Boy Scouts of America in 1952, as part of the Strengthen the Arm of Liberty campaign. It was installed in February 1952 at a site near the landing spot of the Denny Party, who named the first settlement there "New York Alki" before moving to modern-day Downtown Seattle. The site was near a location proposed for a "grand monument" in the 1911 city plan outlined by Virgil Bogue.

The original statue was constructed using stamped copper sheets and was repeatedly damaged by vandals. The entire statue was knocked off its base by vandals in 1975, requiring $350 in repairs funded by the city's parks department. A miniature version of the statue, left inside the larger statue's pedestal base, was re-discovered with a ripped arm that mirrored the acts of an earlier vandal. It was the site of a temporary memorial after the September 11 attacks, with flowers and flags left around the statue. The statue was also used as the backdrop to several protests against the U.S. invasion of Iraq and the subsequent Iraq War.

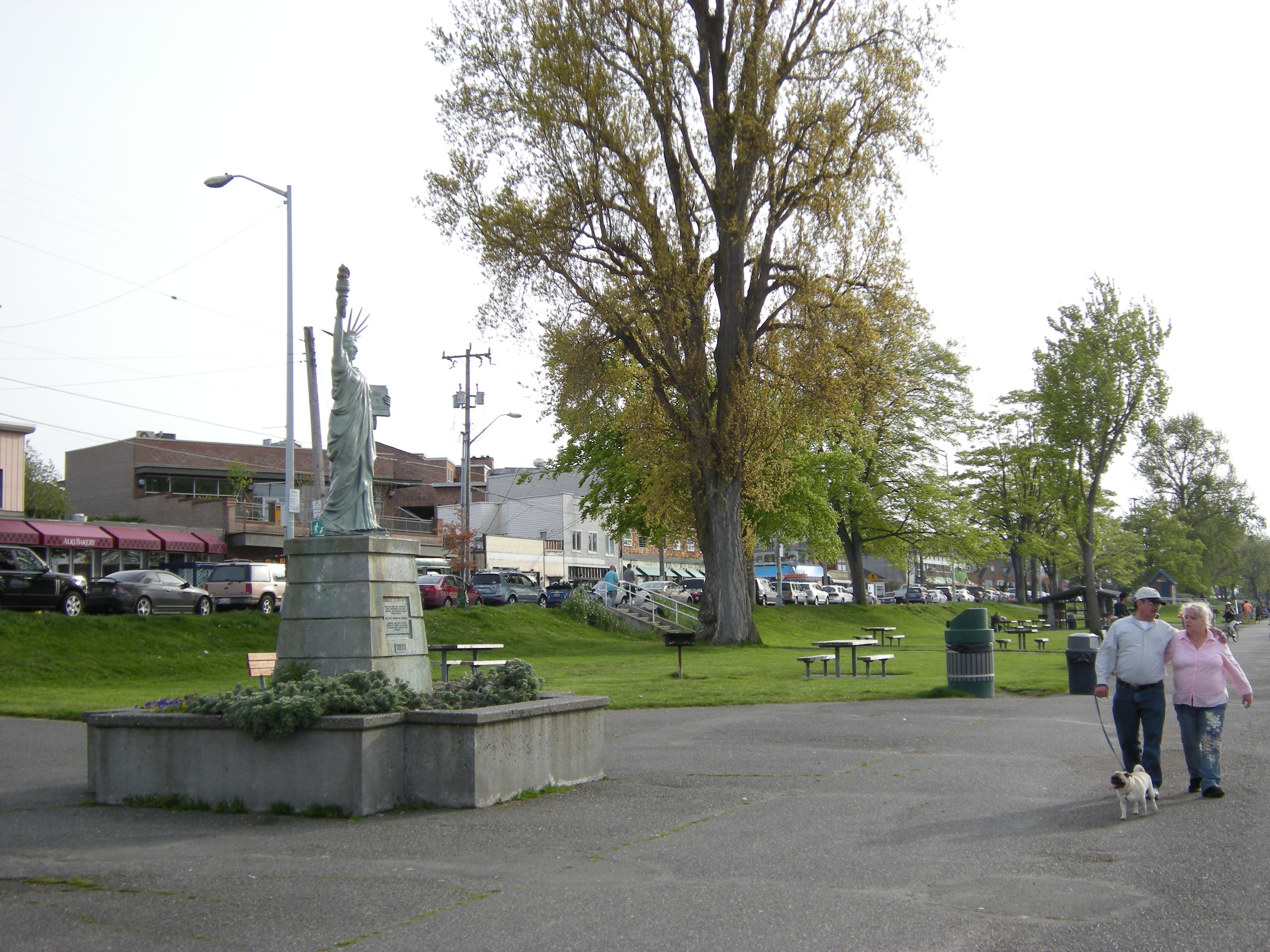
The statue in 2005

The Northwest Programs for the Arts announced plans in 2004 to re-cast the entire sculpture in bronze and began soliciting donations to fund the project. The statue's crown was stolen during the campaign, which received a $15,000 grant from the city's neighborhoods department to complete the project. The old statue was removed in July 2006 and sent to a foundry in Tacoma to be re-cast in bronze and painted copper green. The $140,000 restoration project was completed the following year and the statue was re-installed at Alki Beach on September 11, 2007. The statue is 7.5 feet (2.3 m) tall, about 5 percent of the original's height, and faces north towards Elliott Bay. A new, 4.5-foot (1.4 m) pedestal was also designed for the statue, sitting in a new plaza built by the city's parks department and dedicated in September 2008.

== See also ==
- 1952 in art
