= Duwamish =

Duwamish may refer to:

== People ==
- Duwamish people, a Lushootseed-speaking Indigenous people in Washington state
- Duwamish Tribe, an unrecognized tribe of Duwamish descendants

== Places ==
- Duwamish Head, a promontory jutting into Elliott Bay
- Duwamish River, in Washington state

== Other ==
- Duwamish (fireboat)

== See also ==
- Elliott Bay, often called "Duwamish Bay" in the 19th century
- Duwamish Head, a feature on Seattle's Elliott Bay
