= Birthplace of Seattle Monument =

Monument in Seattle, Washington, U.S.

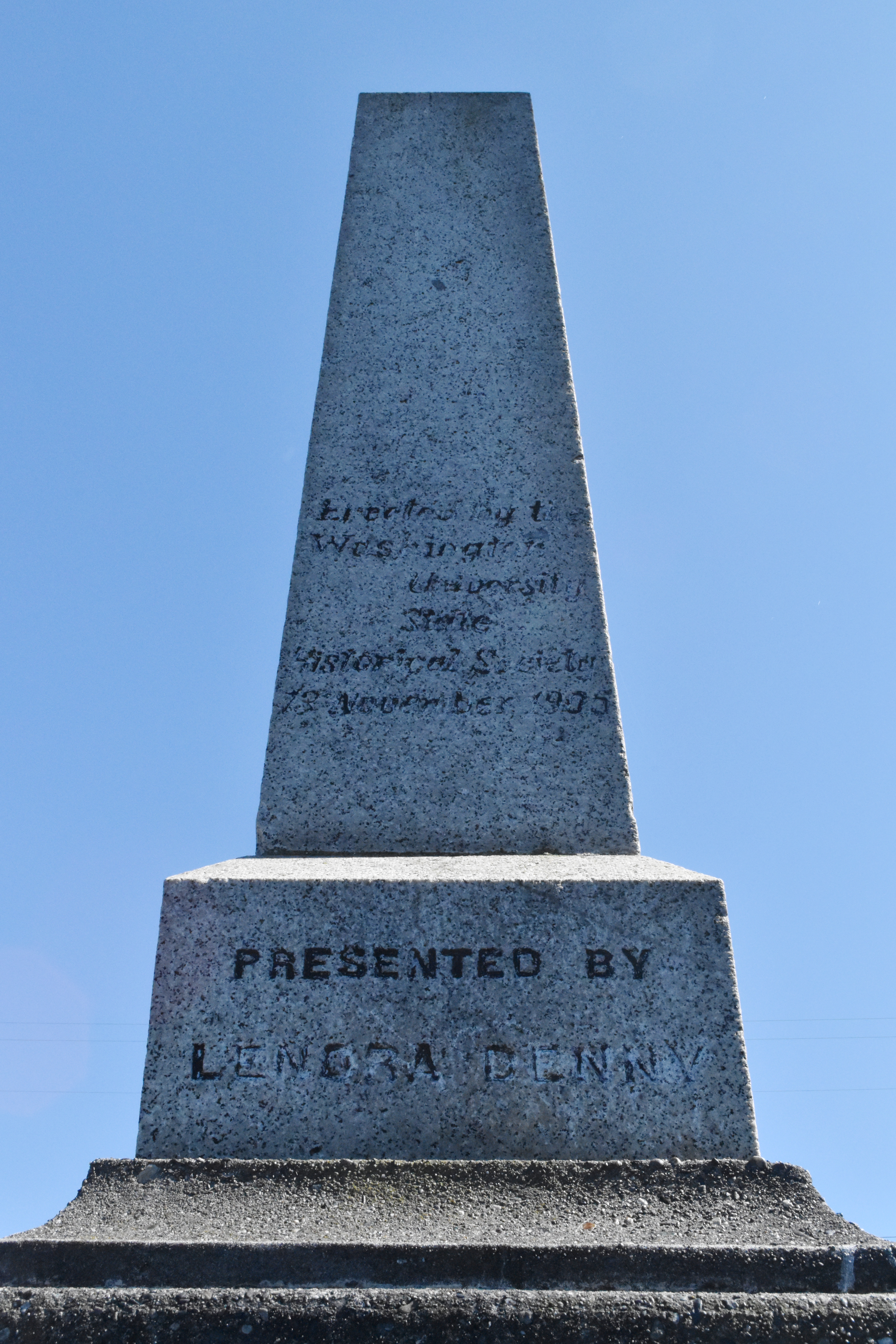
- The monument in 2022
- 47°34′42.5″N 122°24′47.9″W
- Location: Alki Point, Seattle, Washington, U.S.

The Birthplace of Seattle Monument is a granite obelisk on Seattle's Alki Point, in the U.S. state of Washington. Erected in 1905, the monument marks the site where the Denny Party landed in 1851.
