= Scouting in Washington (state) =

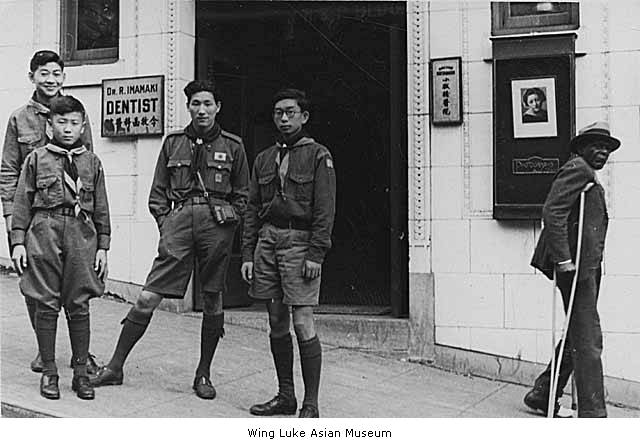
- Four Boy Scouts in Seattle, 1935

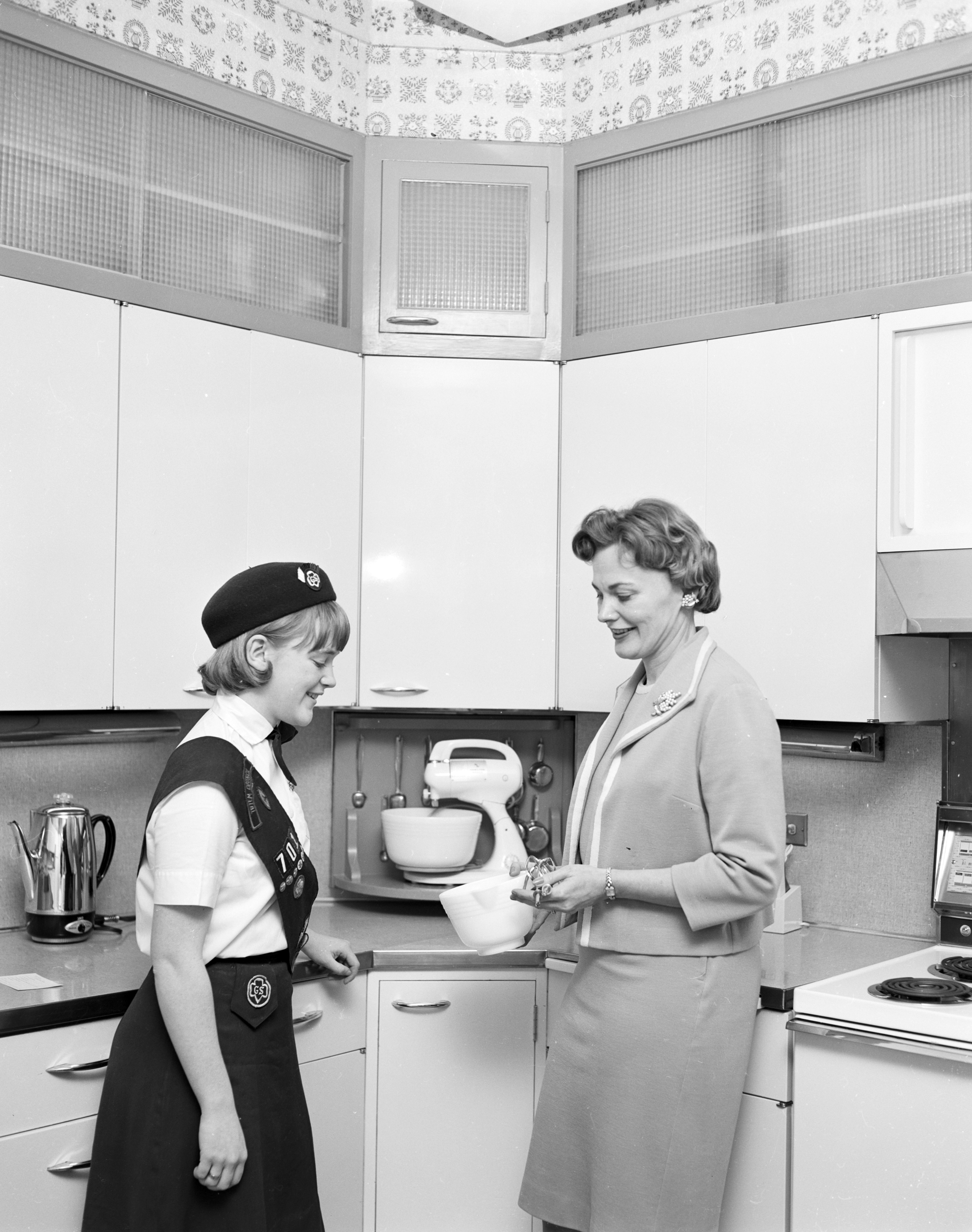
- Seattle girl scout in 1966

Scouting in the US state of Washington officially began in the 1910s.

== History ==
In 1910, a Spokane, Washington Boy Scout leader, the Reverend David Ferry, created a troop under the name of Girl Guides of America. The Girl Guides did not expand much beyond the local area. In 1911, the Girl Scouts of America (not to be confused with the current Girl Scouts of the USA) and the Girl Guides planned to merge with the Camp Fire Girls to form the Girl Pioneers of America, but relationships fractured and the merger failed.

Founded in 1919, Camp Parsons is the oldest continuous running Boy Scout camp west of the Mississippi River and one of the oldest continually running Boy Scout camp in the United States on its original location. It sits on Jackson Cove, part of the Hood Canal, on the Olympic Peninsula, just north of Brinnon, Washington, and just south of Quilcene, Washington. The original land for the camp was donated by Reginald Parsons in 1918.

Camp Black Mountain was founded as a campsite near Maple Falls, Washington which served Western Washington since 1929.

=== Recent history, sale of camp ===
In 1993, Tumwater Area (#737), Twin Harbors Area (#607), and Mount Rainier (#612) merged to form the Pacific Harbors Council (#612). In 1992, the North Central Washington Council (#613) and the Fort Simcoe Area Council (#614) merged to become the Grand Columbia Council (#614).

In 1987, Inland Empire Council changed its name to the Inland Northwest Council (#611). In 1992, Lewis-Clark (#108) and Idaho Panhandle (#110) councils merged into Inland Northwest. In 1956 the Olympic Area Council was formed, merging into Chief Seattle in 1974. In 1994, the Mount Baker Area (#603) and Evergreen Area (#606) councils merged to become the Mount Baker (#606).

By 2012, the Mount Baker Council was working with an "annual operating loss of about $50,000 for each of the past five years", and was looking to sell the Whatcom County camp, even though that camp, and Camp Fire Mountain Skagit County, were still profitable. It was purchased by a private company in 2015 which has renovated the site. It is being rented out as of 2023.

== Scouting America in Washington today ==
There are seven Scouting America councils in Washington.

=== Blue Mountain Council ===
Blue Mountain Council (#604)
- Headquarters: Kennewick, Washington
- Country: United States
- Founded: 1923
- Website www.bmcbsa.org

With headquarters in Kennewick, Washington, the Blue Mountain Council serves Scouts in Washington and Oregon.

==== History ====
In 1923, the Blue Mountain Council (#604) was formed. In 1926, the Umatilla Council (#738) (in Oregon) was formed, merging into Blue Mountain in 1927. In 1926, the Eastern Oregon Area Council (#760) (in Oregon) was formed, merging into Blue Mountain in 1932.

==== Organization ====
The council has six districts:

- Columbia River District serves Kennewick and Finley, Washington
- Eastern Oregon District serves Baker, Wallowa, Union, Grant, and Wheeler counties, Oregon
- Oregon Trail District serves Umatilla, Wheeler, Gilliam, and Morrow counties, Oregon
- Pioneer District serves Walla Walla and Columbia Counties, Washington
- Rattlesnake Ridge District serves Richland, West Richland, and Benton City, Washington
- White Bluffs District serves Franklin County, Washington

==== Camps ====
The Council does not operate a summer camp.

- Camp Wallowa in Joseph, Oregon
- Martin Scout Camp near Pendleton and Pilot Rock, Oregon

==== Order of the Arrow lodge ====
- Wa-La-Moot-Kin Order of the Arrow Lodge

=== Cascade Pacific Council ===
Cascade Pacific Council serves Scouts in Oregon and Washington.

=== Chief Seattle Council ===
Chief Seattle Council (#609)
- Owner: Scouting America
- Country: United States
- Founded: 1954
- Membership: 40,000+
- Website www.seattlebsa.org

The Chief Seattle Council serves the main parts of Puget Sound and Seattle areas including the Olympic Peninsula.

=== Grand Columbia Council ===
Grand Columbia Council (#614)
- Owner: Scouting America
- Country: United States
- Website www.grandcolumbia.org

Was located in central Washington and based in Yakima, the Grand Columbia Council served the Chelan, Douglas, Grant, Kittitas, Okanogan, Yakima and portions of Adams, Benton, Ferry and Klickitat Counties.

==== History ====
In 1923, the Columbia District Council (#605) was formed, and ended in 1924.

In 1922, the Wenatchee Council (#613) was formed, and changed its name to North Central Washington (#613) in 1924.

In 1919, the Yakima Council (#614) was formed, and changed its name to Yakima County (#614) in 1924. It changed its name to Yakima Valley Area (#614) in 1925. It changed its name again in 1942 to Central Washington Area (#614), and again in 1954 to Fort Simcoe Area (#614).

In 1992, the North Central Washington Council (#613) and the Fort Simcoe Area Council (#614) merged to become the Grand Columbia Council (#614).

In 2023, the Grand Columbia Council (#614) merged with Chief Seattle Council (#609).

==== Organization ====
The council is now divided into three districts Highland District, Basalt Coulee District, and Simcoe District. It has one service center in Yakima.

==== Camps ====
The council operates four camps:

- Camp Fife off of Highway 410 near Bumping Lake
- Camp Bonaparte between Tonasket and Republic on Highway 20
- Camp Scout-A-Vista outside Wenatchee

==== Order of the Arrow lodge ====
- Tataliya Lodge 614

=== Inland Northwest Council ===
Inland Northwest Council (#611)
- Owner: Scouting America
- Country: United States
- Website www.nwscouts.org

With headquarters in Spokane the Inland Northwest Council serves Scouts in Washington and Idaho.

The Inland Northwest Council provides the communities and volunteers with a council service center. The council service center has a Scout Shop and staff to answer questions, provide training and resources, and is able to take registrations for summer camp or events.

In 2009, the council sponsored a statue in Spokane. Titled Footsteps To The Future, it honors community mentors.

==== History ====
In 1919 the Nez Perce County Council (#108) (In Idaho) was founded. It changed its name to Lewiston (#108) in 1922. In 1925, it changed its name to Lewis-Clark Area (#108). In 1928 it merged into Spokane Area (#611). In 1922 the Bonner-Boundary Council (#106) (In Idaho) was founded. It merged into the Shoshone County Council (#110) in 1926. In 1918 the Shoshone County Council (#110) (In Idaho) was founded. In 1923, it became the Shoshone-Kootenai Council (#110). In 1928, it changed its name to the Idaho Panhandle Council (#110).

In 1915 the Spokane Council (#611) was founded. It changed its name in 1925 to Spokane Area (#611) in 1925. In 1921 the Palouse Council (#611) was founded, and it merged into the Spokane Area Council (#611) in 1927. In 1931, Spokane Area changed its name to the Inland Empire Council (#611).

In 1987, Inland Empire Council changed its name to the Inland Northwest Council (#611). In 1992, Lewis-Clark (#108) and Idaho Panhandle (#110) councils merged into Inland Northwest.

==== Organization ====
The council has four districts:

- Three Rivers District - Northern Spokane, Stevens and Pend Orielle counties
- Bigfoot District - South Spokane County, Lincoln County, Adams County
- Mountain Lakes District - Kootenai, Bonner, Boundary, Northern Shoshone, and Benewah counties in Idaho
- Appaloosa District - Whitman, Asotin, Columbia, Garfield, Idaho, Latah, Lewis, Nez Perce, and Clearwater counties

==== Camps ====
- Camp Easton in Harrison, Idaho
- Camp Grizzly in Harvard, Idaho
- Cowles Scout Reservation in Newport, Washington

==== Order of the Arrow ====
- The Es-Kaielgu Order of the Arrow Lodge serves the council

=== Mount Baker Council ===
Mount Baker Council (#606)
- Owner: Scouting America
- Country: United States
- Founded: 1994
- Website www.mountbakerbsa.org

The Mount Baker Council of the BSA serves Scouts in the Snohomish, Skagit, Whatcom, Island and San Juan counties of Washington.

==== History ====
In 1918, the Bellingham Council (#603) was formed. It changed its name to Whatcom County (#603) in 1926. In 1923, the Skagit County Council (#610) was formed. In 1929, Whatcom County and Skagit County councils merged to become the Mount Baker Area Council (#603). In 1918, the Everett Council (#606) was formed. It changed its name to Evergreen Area (#606) in 1941. In 1994, the Mount Baker Area (#603) and Evergreen Area (#606) councils merged to become the Mount Baker (#606).

==== Organization ====
The council is made of the following districts:

- Pilchuck District: Serves Arlington, Camano Island, Clearview, Darrington, Gold Bar, Granite Falls, Index, Lake Stevens, Lakewood, Maltbey, Marysville, Monroe, Snohomish, and Stanwood.
- Salish Sea District: Serves Bothell, Brier, Edmonds, Everett, Lynnwood, Mill Creek, Mountlake Terrace, Mukilteo, and Silver Firs.
- North Cascade District: Serves Skagit County, Whatcom County, the islands of Whidbey, Fidalgo, and the San Juans.

==== Camps ====
- Fire Mountain Scout Reservation] in Mt. Vernon, Washington
- Camp Black Mountain in Maple Falls, Washington was sold in 2015 and no longer operates as a council camp.

==== Order of the Arrow ====
The council's Order of the Arrow lodge is Sikhs Mox Lamonti #338. which was created in 1995 through the merger of Kelcema Lodge #305 and Quilshan #325. Sikhs Mox Lamonti translates to "Friends of two mountains", which is a reference to the Mount Baker Council's camps Black Mountain and Fire Mountain.

=== Pacific Harbors Council ===
Pacific Harbors Council (#612)
- Owner: Scouting America
- Country: United States
- Founded: 1993
- Website www.pacificharbors.org

The Pacific Harbors Council of serves the scouts in the Pierce, King, Mason, Thurston, Pacific and Grays Harbor Counties of Washington State. The council operates one Scout camp: Camp Thunderbird. In 1994 the Mount Rainier Council, Tumwater Area Council, and Twin Harbors Council merged to form the Pacific Harbors Council. The council operates two service centers. The main office is located in Tacoma, Washington and the other is located at Camp thunderbird outside of Tumwater, Washington.

==== History ====
In 1918, the Hoquiam Council formed. It closed in 1919. In 1918, the Chehalis Council formed. It closed in 1921. In 1926, the Tumwater Area Council (#737) formed. In 1923, the Grays Harbor County Council (#607) formed, changing its name to Twin Harbors Area Council (#607) in 1930. In 1918, the Tacoma Council (#612) formed, changing its name to Pierce County Council (#612) in 1924. It changed its name again in 1927 to the Tacoma Area Council (#612), and once more in 1948 to Mount Rainier Council (#612). In 1993, Tumwater Area(#737), Twin Harbors Area (#607), and Mount Rainier (#612) merged to form the Pacific Harbors Council (#612).

==== Organization ====
- Olympic District
- Rainier District

==== Camps ====
- Camp Thunderbird in Olympia, Washington provides council resident Cub Camp, campores, Order of the arrow nisqually lodge 155 campouts, recreational troop camping and serves as a council training center used for NYLT, Wood badge, and Territory training conference.

==== Order of the Arrow lodge ====
- Nisqually Lodge Order of the Arrow serves the council.

== Girl Scouting in Washington ==
Girl Scouting in Washington
- Map of Girl Scout Councils in Washington

There are three Girl Scout councils serving Washington.

=== Girl Scouts of Western Washington ===
Girl Scouts of Western Washington
- Headquarters: Seattle, Washington
- Country: United States
- Founded: 2007
- Website www.girlscoutsww.org

This council was formed by the merger of Pacific Peaks and Totem Councils on October 1, 2007. Administrative offices are located in Seattle, Washington. The new council serves over 26,000 girls.

Camps

- Girl Scout Camp Evergreen is 76 acres (310,000 m^{2}) near Longview, Washington
- Girl Scout Camp Klahanee is 78 acres (320,000 m^{2}) near Hoquiam, Washington
- Girl Scout Camp Lyle McLeod is 60 acres (240,000 m^{2}) near Belfair, Washington
- Girl Scout Camp River Ranch is 430 forested acres in Carnation, Washington including Lake Langlois and is by the Tolt River
- Girl Scout Camp Robbinswold is 540 acres (2.2 km^{2}) on the Hood Canal near Lilliwaup, Washington
- Girl Scout Camp St. Albans is 414 acres (1.68 km^{2}) near Belfair, Washington
- Girl Scout Camp Towhee is roughly 100 acres (0.4 km^{2}) near Peaceful Valley, Washington

=== Girl Scouts of Eastern Washington and Northern Idaho ===
Girl Scouts Eastern Washington and Northern Idaho
- Headquarters: Spokane, Washington
- Country: United States
- Founded: 2007
- Website www.gsewni.org

Girl Scouts Eastern Washington and Northern Idaho was formed on May 1, 2007, by the merger of Girl Scouts Mid-Columbia Council and Girl Scouts Inland Empire Council. It serves Eastern Washington and North Idaho, an area also known as the Inland Empire.

Service Centers

- Sandpoint, Idaho
- Coeur d'Alene, Idaho
- Lewiston, Idaho
- Tri-Cities, Washington
- Yakima, Washington

Camps

- Camp 4 Echos is 230 acres (0.93 km^{2}) on Lake Coeur d'Alene in Idaho.

=== Girl Scouts of Oregon and Southwest Washington ===
This council was established on October 1, 2008, and serves girls in Clark and Skamania counties.

== See also ==
- Scouting in British Columbia
