= Hamilton Viewpoint =

Park in Seattle, Washington, United States

- Hamilton Viewpoint with the Space Needle in the distance in 2013.
- Interactive map of Hamilton Viewpoint
- Type: Urban Park
- Location: Seattle, Washington
- Coordinates: 47°35′36″N 122°23′10″W
- Area: 16.9 acres (6.8 ha)
- Established: 1918; 108 years ago
- Operator: Seattle Parks and Recreation

Hamilton Viewpoint is a 16.9-acre (6.8 ha) public park in the West Seattle neighborhood of Seattle, Washington, United States. It was acquired by the city in 1914 and became a park 4 years later. Its namesake is Rupert L. Hamilton, a noted figure in the West Seattle community who helped establish the park. It had previously been known as West Side Park and Duwamish Head Park.
