= Carson Boren =

American settler

Carson D. Boren
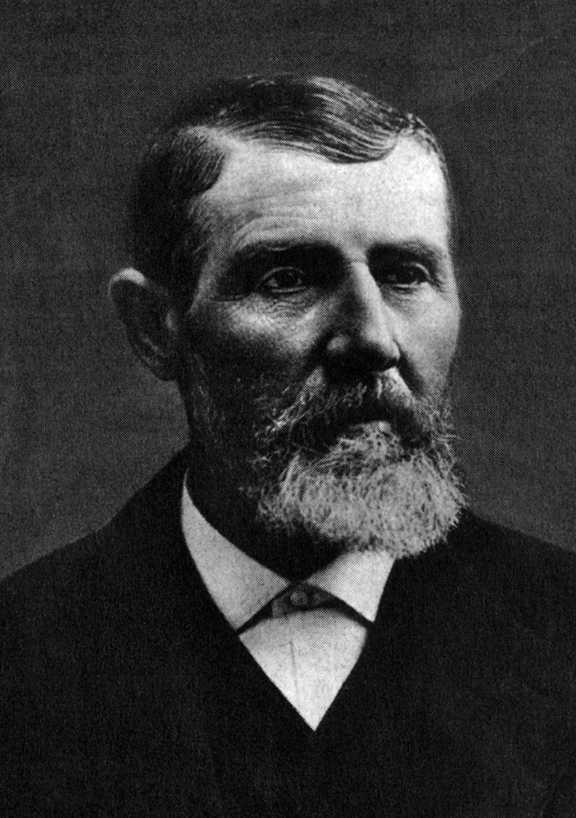
- Born: December 12, 1824; Nashville, Tennessee
- Died: August 19, 1912 (aged 87); Woodinville, Washington
- Resting place: Lake View Cemetery
- Occupation: King County Sheriff
- Known for: Early Founder of Seattle
- Spouse: Mary Ann Kays
- Children: Sarah E., Gertrude Livonia

Carson Dobbins Boren (December 12, 1824 – August 19, 1912) was an early founder of Seattle, Washington (see Denny Party). His sister Mary Ann was married to Arthur Denny, and his sister Louisa to David Denny. Boren was the first King County Sheriff. Seattle's Boren Avenue is named in his honor.

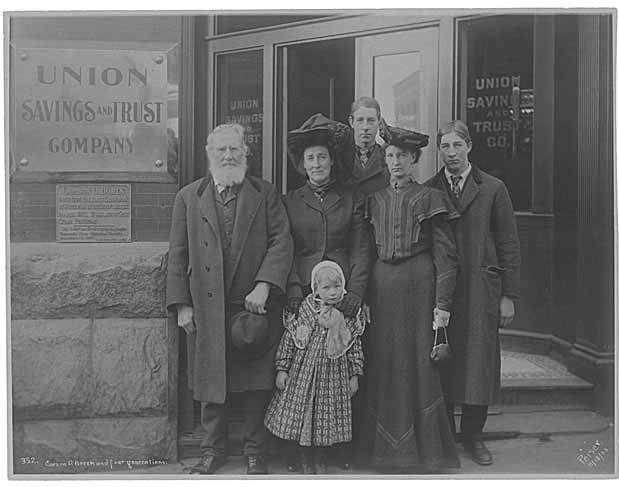
Carson D. Boren next to a plaque memorializing him by the Union Savings & Trust Company along with family in 1905

Although he was an important figure in the early years of Seattle, historian Junius Rochester writes that "The pioneering contributions of Carson Dobbins Boren to the founding of Alki (in future West Seattle) and Seattle began and ended within a short period of six years."

== Biography ==
Carson Boren was born in Nashville, Tennessee. He married Mary Ann Kays (November 6, 1830 – June 21, 1905) on February 18, 1849, at Abingdon, Knox County, Illinois. Their first daughter Sarah E. was born December 17, 1849, but died 17 days later and is buried in the Cherry Grove Cemetery in Knox County. A second daughter, Gertrude Livonia (December 12, 1850 – June 3, 1912), was carried as an infant on the cross-country trek in 1851 with the Denny Party.

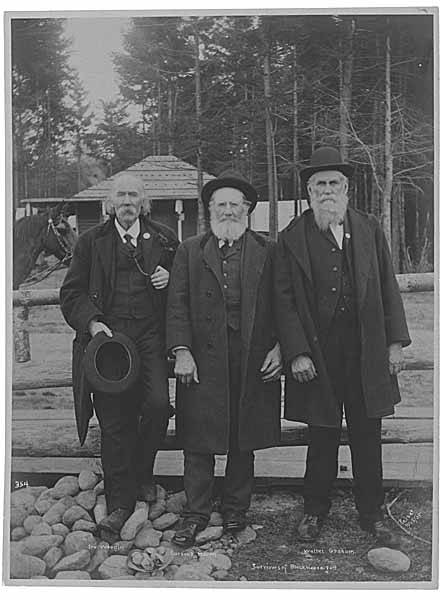
Ira Woodin, Carson D. Boren, and Walter Graham (for whom the Graham Hill area is named) in 1905

In 1852, Boren gave Henry Yesler the southern portion of his claim so as to construct Yesler's mill.

After erecting the first home in what would become downtown Seattle (the previous structures had been at Alki), the couple participated in the early life of Seattle and had two more children, William Richard (October 4, 1854 – January 19, 1899) and Mary Louise (May 3, 1857 – January 1, 1926). In 1855 they sold this property, along with a 320-acre (130 ha) claim extending uphill from the waterfront between what are now James and Marion Streets, to Edward Lander and Charles Terry. The couple argued over Carson's constant hunting trips and giveaways, and by 1860 they separated. They were divorced by territorial legislative act December 17, 1861. Their children were raised by the Dennys. Mary Ann went south to The Dalles, Oregon, and established a dressmaking business. There she had another daughter, Lydia Dell Blakeney (January 18, 1869 – October 6, 1921) with John William Blakeney, a divorced man; they married in November 1872, but separated about 1880 and divorced in 1884. Mary Ann and Lydia moved back to Seattle.

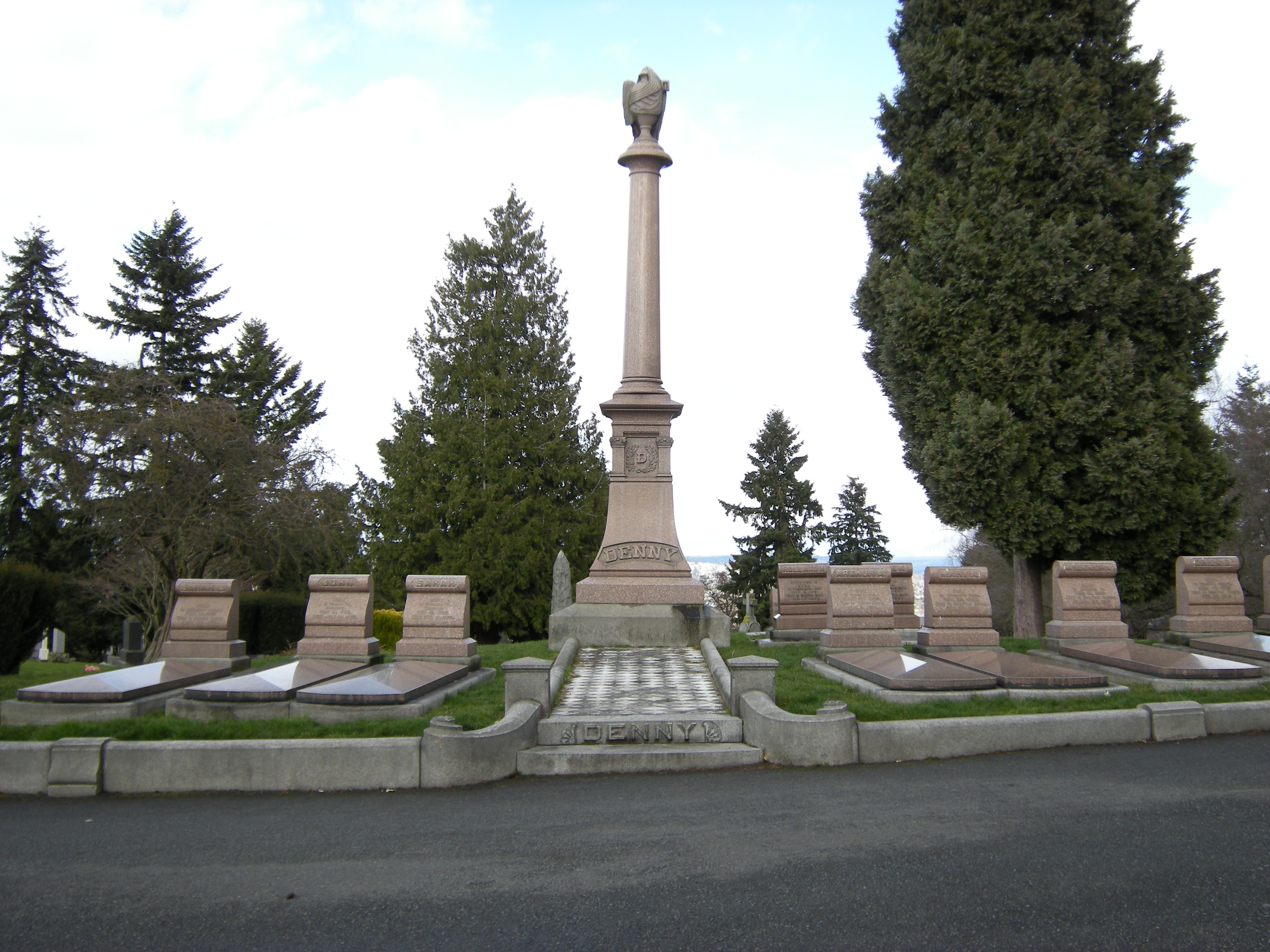
The Denny Family plot, where Carson and his daughter Livonia are buried.

Mary Ann Boren apparently kept in touch with her children by Carson Boren and lived with her youngest daughter and son-in-law in what is now the International District of Seattle. When she died in 1905, she was buried in an unmarked grave in Lake View Cemetery, down the hill from where Carson Boren and their unmarried daughter (called Livonia as an adult) are buried in style with the Denny Clan.
