= Alki Beach Park =

Beach park in Seattle, Washington, U.S.

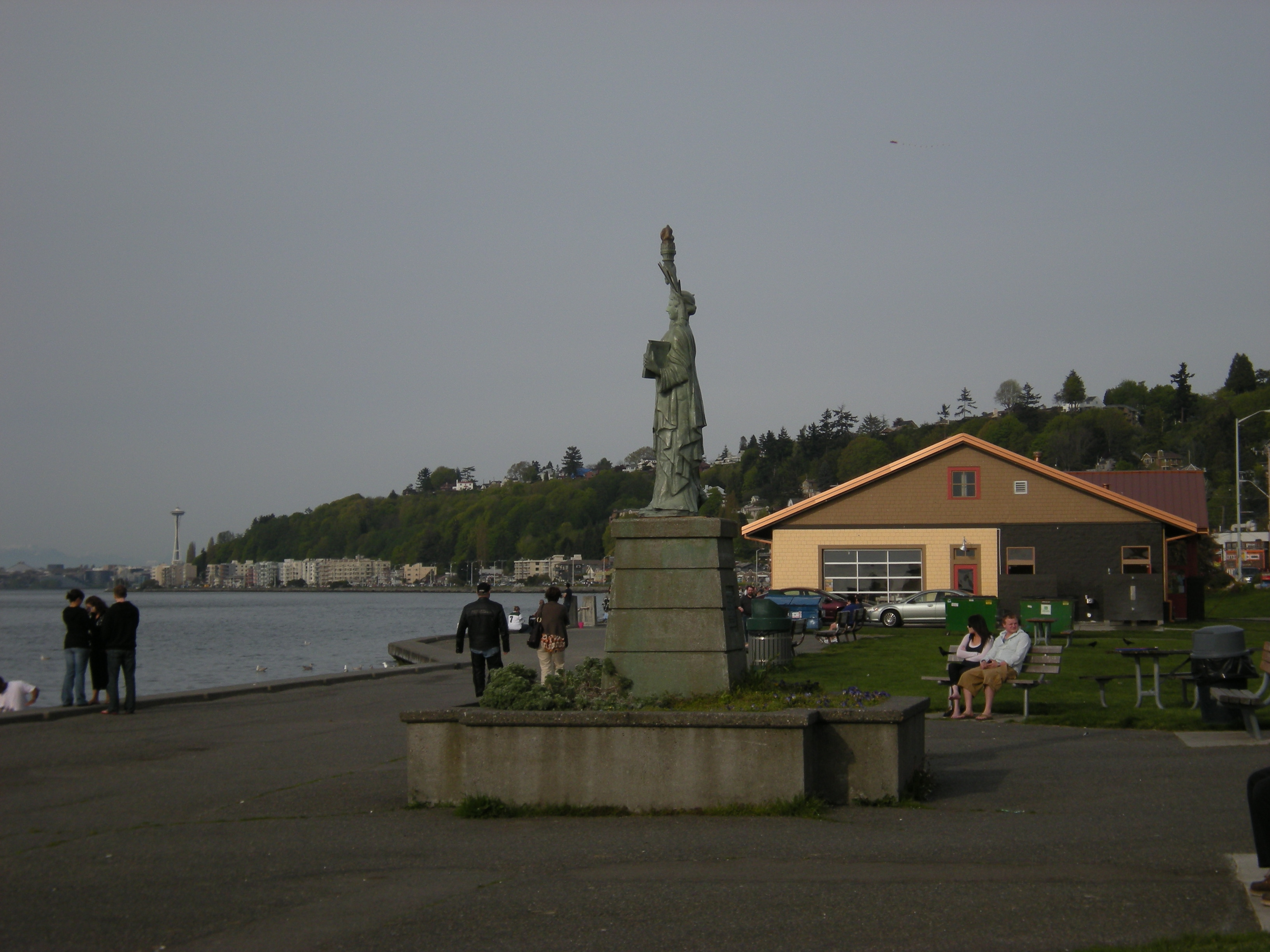
- Alki Beach Park with replica of Statue of Liberty
- Interactive map of Alki Beach Park
- Location: West Seattle, Washington, US
- Coordinates: 47°34′52″N 122°24′24″W
- Area: 135.9 acres (55.0 ha)
- Created: 1907
- Operator: Seattle Parks and Recreation

Alki Beach Park is a 135.9-acre (55.0 ha) park located in the West Seattle neighborhood of Seattle, Washington that consists of the Elliott Bay beach between Alki Point and Duwamish Head. It has a 0.5 miles (0.80 km) of beachfront, and was the first public salt-water bathing beach on the west coast of the United States. It is open daily from 4am to 11:30pm.

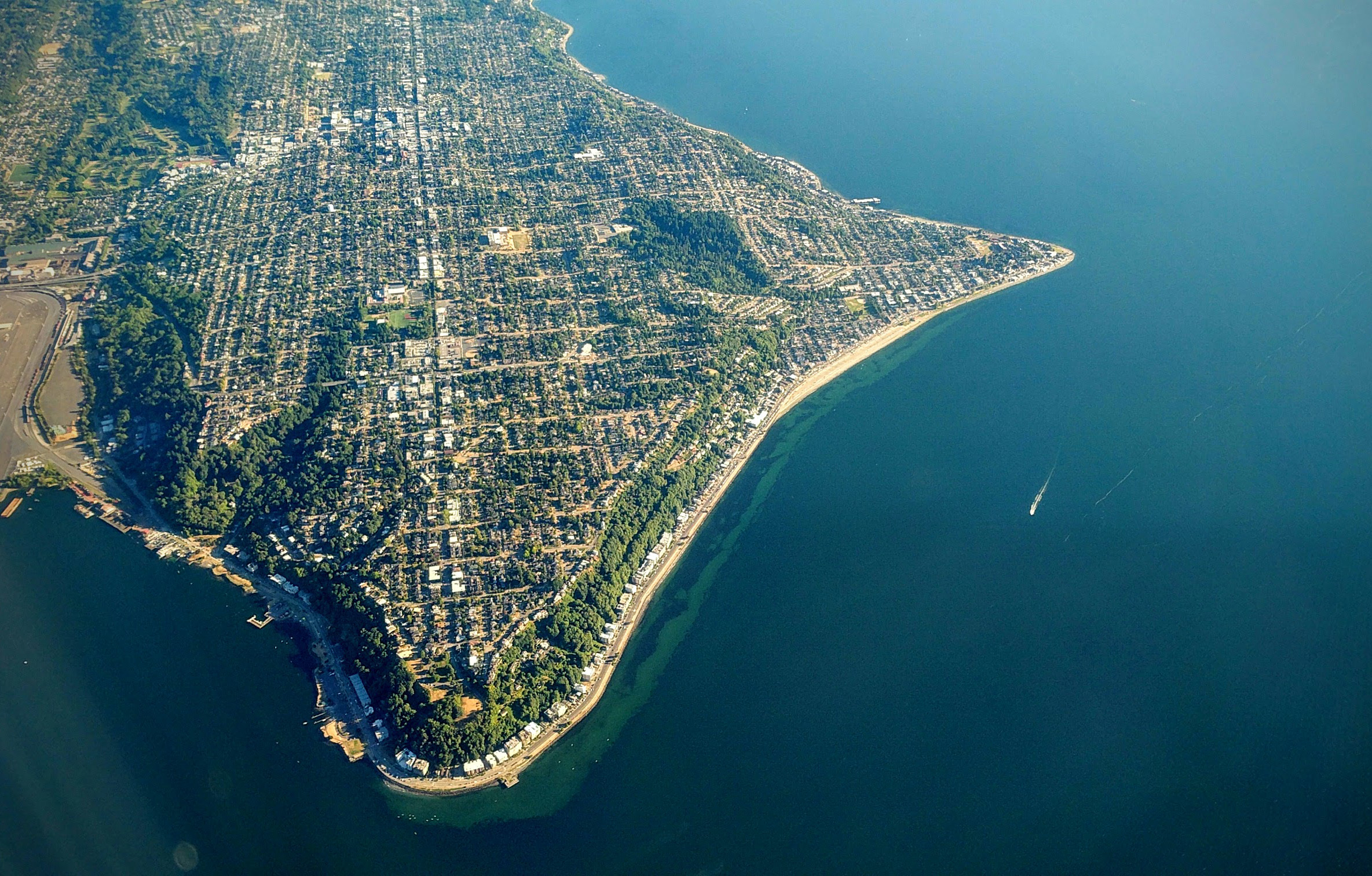
Aerial view of Alki, North Admiral, and Genesee neighborhoods of West Seattle, with Alki Beach

The beach has a replica of the Statue of Liberty that was installed in 1952. The Alki Point Monument memorializing Seattle's pioneer White settlers is also located in the park. Dogs are allowed in the park, but not on the beach. There is a $500.00 fine for pets on the beach.

On June 27, 1959, reports of an unexploded naval mine caused the beach to be closed while police evacuated 1,000 people. The reported mine was found to be a homemade anchor with long spikes.
