= Reginald Parsons =

American businessman

Reginald Hascall Parsons (October 3, 1873 - June 9, 1955) was a Seattle businessman and philanthropist during the first half of the twentieth century. He was born on Long Island, New York and came west to Seattle with his family in 1904 to manage the Bemis Bag Company there.

== Background ==
Parsons became the first president of the Seattle Area Council of the Boy Scouts of America in 1916 and held the position for five years. He donated to the Council the original plot of land on the Hood Canal that soon after became Camp Parsons (which opened in 1919). During the same time period (1916 - 1921), Parsons served in the Seattle Chamber of Commerce. Parsons was later active on the National Board of the Boy Scouts of America and spent much of his time involved with several other organizations including the Seattle Social Welfare League, the Pacific Coast Defense League, the Seattle Community Chest, Lakeside School, and the National Chamber of Commerce.
