= Duwamish Head =

Landform in Seattle, Washington, United States

Duwamish Head sqʷədqs (Lushootseed)
- Headland
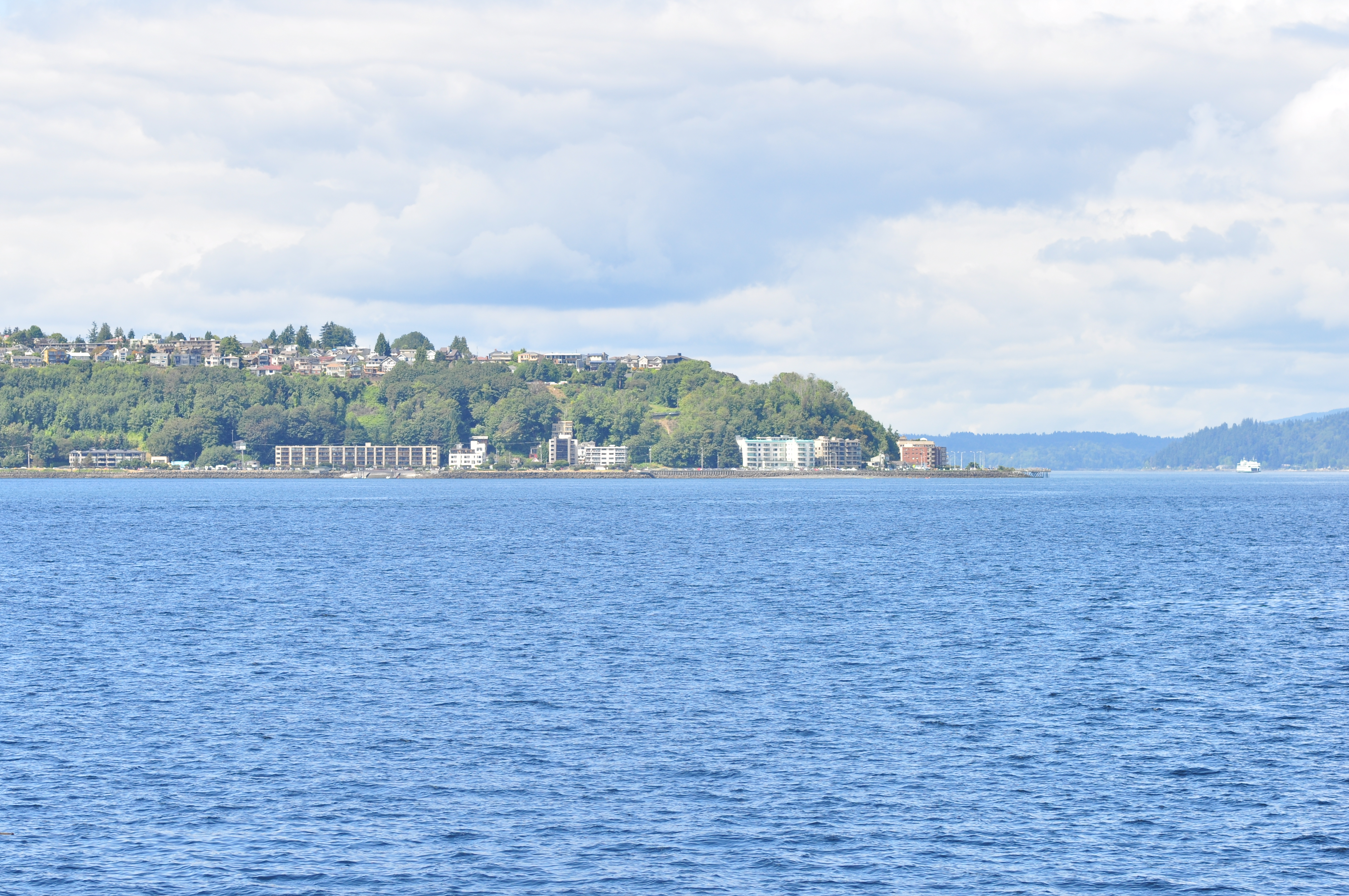
- Duwamish Head seen from Elliott Bay

- Coordinates: 47°35′42″N 122°23′10″W
- Location: West Seattle, Seattle, King County, Washington, US
- Topo map: USGS Duwamish Head

Duwamish Head (Lushootseed: sqʷədqs) (Note: Pronounced SKWHUHD-ks; lit. "waterfall point") is the northernmost point in West Seattle, Washington, jutting into Elliott Bay.

A large boulder covered with petroglyphs once lay on the beach. The Duwamish tribe was relocated to a reservation here in 1856, which at the time was referred to as Holderness Point. From 1907 to 1913 it was the site of an amusement park, Luna Park. Today, Alki Beach Park extends southwestward from Duwamish Head to Alki Point; the area at the head is sometimes called "Anchor Park" due to the 5,000-pound (2,300 kg) anchor at the site.

On June 19, 2020, two teens utilizing the app Randonautica reported finding a suitcase along the shoreline, emitting a foul odor. The Seattle Police Department was dispatched to the scene, and the contents of the suitcase were confirmed to be human remains. The two teens then uploaded videos of their discovery of the suitcase to the popular social media app TikTok. On June 30, the remains were identified as 35-year-old Jessica Lewis, and her boyfriend, 27-year-old Austin Wenner, both determined to have died of gunshot wounds. On August 19, the former landlord of the pair, Michael Lee Dudley, was arrested. He was then charged with two counts of second-degree murder on August 24. In 2022, Dudley was convicted of killing both victims. He was sentenced to 46 years in prison the following year.
