= Chief Seattle Council =

Local scouting governing body

Chief Seattle Council (#609)
- Owner: Scouting America
- Country: United States
- Founded: 1915
- Membership: 40,000+
- Scout Executive: Manny Ramos
- Deputy Scout Executive: Brandon Lewis
- Council Commissioner: Mindy Linton
- Website www.scoutingseattle.org

Chief Seattle Council (originally called Seattle Area Council) is the local council governing the scouting activities of Scouting America in a large part of the Puget Sound and Seattle area, including almost all of the Olympic Peninsula.

== History ==
In 1915 the Seattle Council was formed, changing its name to Seattle Area in 1924, and to Chief Seattle in 1954.

In 1917 the Bremerton and Port Angeles councils were formed, both ceased operation in 1919 and the Seattle Council took over were they had served. In 1956 the Olympic Area Council was formed, merging into Chief Seattle in 1974.

== Organization ==
The council is divided into territories, which are themselves divided into districts:

- Grand Columbia Territory: Contains the Basalt Coulee, Highlands, and Simcoe Mountain districts, replacing the former Grand Columbia Council.
  - Basalt Coulee: Includes Adams, Grant, and Kittitas counties and Southern portions of Chelan and Douglas counties. Its OA lodge is Sinkiuse.
  - Highlands: Includes Ferry and Okanogan counties and Northern portions of Chelan and Douglas counties. Its OA lodge is Entiat.
  - Simcoe Mountains: Includes Yakima county and portions of Benton and Klickitat counties. Its OA lodge is Wy'am.
- Lake Trails Territory: Contains the Lake Trails North and Lake Trails South districts.
  - Lake Trails North (formerly Northern Trails): Includes Bothell, Carnation, Duvall, Kenmore, Redmond, Woodinville. Its OA chapter is Ashuk T'Salil.
  - Lake Trails South (formerly Lake Shores): Includes Bellevue, Washington, Juanita, Kirkland, and Mercer Island. Its OA chapter is Sunyakwa.
- Mountain Territory: Contains the Alpine and Mt. Tahoma districts.
  - Alpine District: Includes Fall City, Issaquah, North Bend, Sammamish, Snoqualmie, portions of Newcastle, and the Renton Highlands. Its OA chapter is Lamonti Tupso Illahee.
  - Mt. Tahoma: Includes Auburn, Black Diamond, Covington, Kent, Newcastle, Maple Valley, Pacific, Renton, Skyway. Its OA chapter is Hyas Eena.
- Peninsulas Territory: Contains the Kitsap and Mt. Olympus districts.
  - Kitsap District: Includes Bainbridge Island, Seabeck, Crosby, Bremerton, Silverdale, Port Orchard, Belfair, Bangor, Erlands Point-Kitsap Lake, Indianola, Kingston, Manchester, Navy Yard City, Olalla, Parkwood, Poulsbo, Suquamish, Tracyton. Its OA chapter is Mox Kar-Po.
  - Mt. Olympus: Includes Clallam and Jefferson counties. Its OA chapter is Siam Chetwoot.
- Seattle Territory: Contains the Aurora and Duwamish districts.
  - Aurora District: Includes Lake Forest Park, North Seattle, Shoreline. Its OA chapter is Hyiu Chuck.
  - Duwamish District: Includes Beacon Hill, Burien, Capitol Hill, Central District, Columbia City, Des Moines, Hillman City, Madrona, Montlake, Normandy Park, Rainier Beach, Rainier Valley, SeaTac, Seattle, South Seattle, Tukwila, Vashon Island, West Seattle, White Center. Its OA chapter is Kwahnice.

== Camps ==
=== Camp Bonaparte ===
Camp Bonaparte on the shore of Bonaparte Lake

Camp Bonaparte is located on the shore of Bonaparte Lake in the Okanogan Highlands east of Tonasket, Washington in northern central Washington. Established in 1958 by the North-Central Washington Council on approximately 80 acres (32 ha)s land leased from the Colville National Forest and private logging companies. A 2013 severe thunderstorm damaged two buildings at the camp, with the commissary/kitchen being a total loss. It was replaced in 2014. The camp became part of the Chief Seattle Council when the Grand Columbia Council merged into Chief Seattle in 2023. The camp is operated as a wilderness camp.

=== Camp Edward ===
Camp Edward, previously known as Camp Brinkley, is a camp in Snohomish, Washington. It was founded in 1967 and originally held a resident summer camp program for Boy Scouts, but has since transitioned to a summer camp program for Cub Scouts. Camp Edward is a part of the Cascade Scout Reservation.

=== Camp Pigott ===
Camp Pigott, (named after former Paccar CEO and philanthropist Charles M. Pigott), has run a resident summer camp program since its re-opening in 2003. It had formerly been named Camp Omache, and had been closed since 1991. Camp Pigott is a part of the Cascade Scout Reservation.

Camp Pigott sits on Lake Hughes in Snohomish, Washington. It features a 35' high-ropes course known as the C.O.P.E. course. The course is a non-linear design so Scouts can choose a variety of challenges and pathways. The camp also includes a 42' covered climbing tower with three climbing surfaces (including a real rock surface and overhang) and one, two-lane rappelling surface. Camp Pigott also has a mountain biking course and a blacksmith shop. The camp has a dining hall that is equipped with a full size industrial kitchen, and indoor/outdoor fireplace for the main hall.

Camp Pigott is home of the Order of the Arrow T'Kope Kwiskwis Lodge's ceremonial longhouse.

=== Camp Sheppard ===
Camp Sheppard is a camp outside of Enumclaw, Washington. Sheppard does not run a resident Scout camping program, but does run several other Scout programs including a Winter Camp program for Cub Scouts and Boy Scouts. Since 2011, Sheppard has been the location for the Council's National Youth Leadership Training, usually holding four sessions every year in the summer.

Until 2009, Camp Sheppard was a High Adventure base, where it offered programs in mountaineering, mountain biking, and backpacking.

Until 2014, it hosted the "Mom & Me/Dad & Me" Cub Scout camping programs, after which they were moved to Camp Edward.

=== Camp Parsons ===
Camp Parsons
- Location: Brinnon, WA
- Coordinates: 47.7460°N 122.86955°W
- Founded: July 7, 1919
- Camp Director: Frank Schrock
- Camp Ranger: Dale Wills
- Website http://www.campparsons.org/

Founded in 1919, Camp Parsons is the oldest continuous running Boy Scout camp west of the Mississippi River and one of the oldest continually running Boy Scout camps in the United States on its original location. It sits on Jackson Cove, part of the Hood Canal, on the Olympic Peninsula, just north of Brinnon, Washington, and just south of Quilcene, Washington. The site of the camp was chosen by Professor Edmund Meany, Major Edward Ingraham and members of the Seattle Area Council. It was purchased from John Strom in May 1919 and named after the first council president, Reginald H. Parsons. Booth Hall (the current Silver Marmot Grill) was constructed in May and June 1919 and continues to be used today. On July 7, 1919, 100 Scouts arrived at Camp Parsons for its first season that ran 6 weeks and has not stopped since. A separate camp for Cub Scouts was developed on the property in 1937 and named Camp Meany in honor of the late Professor Edmund Meany, first Scout commissioner for Seattle. This camp was merged into Camp Parsons in 1941 and that camp's dining hall served as the dining hall for Camp Parsons until the summer 2014 after which it was razed and Garvey Hall, the current dining hall, was constructed and dedicated in June 2015.

The Order of the Silver Marmot was formed in 1926 to recognize honor campers at Parsons. After the Order of the Arrow expanded to Seattle in 1950s, the Order of the Silver Marmot was discontinued and the Seattle Area Council's lodge was named T'Kope Kwis Kwis, or 'The Silver Marmot' in Chinook jargon, in honor of the Order of the Silver Marmot. It was revived in 1984 to recognize camp staff and high adventure participants and it continues to operate today.

Thousands of Scouts from the Pacific Northwest and throughout the United States and Canada attend camp each summer. Camp Parsons is the only Boy Scout Camp that uses a salt water beach for all aquatic activities. Camp Parsons also has had hiking treks for Scouts to explore the Olympic Mountains and Kayak treks to explore the Hood Canal, however it does not currently offer high adventure programs.

== Order of the Arrow ==
T'Kope Kwiskwis Lodge
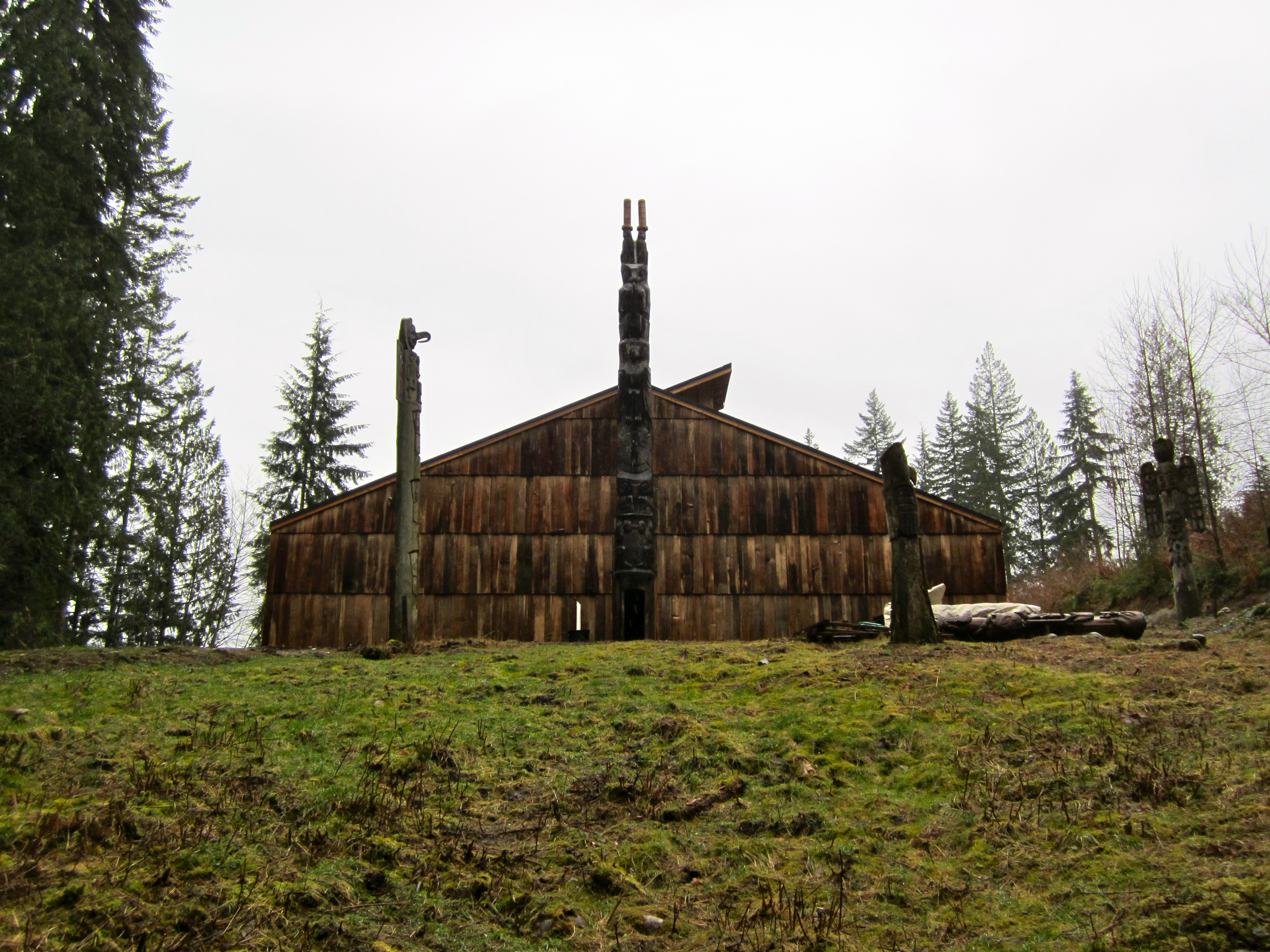
- Lodge Chief: Nicholas Krum
- Lodge Advisor: John Strong
- Staff Advisor: Torin Bergsma
- Website http://www.tkopekwiskwis.org/

Chief Seattle Council's local lodge in the Order of the Arrow (OA) is T'Kope Kwiskwis Lodge, founded in 1954. The name translates to '[The Order of] The Silver Marmot Lodge' and refers to the council's original honor society that originated at Camp Parsons, the Order of the Silver Marmot. Unlike other lodges around the United States, which wear the Plains Indian style of regalia for their ceremonies, T'Kope, along with neighboring lodges, has worn button blankets. Starting in 2026, T'Kope has retired the use of regalia in ceremonies in accordance with OA's national guidelines on ceremonial attire.

T'Kope Kwiskwis is divided into chapters which correspond to the Council's districts (see Organization).

In April 2013, T'Kope Kwiskwis completed the reconstruction of a ceremonial longhouse at Camp Pigott that is used for Order of the Arrow ceremonies.

The T'Kope Kwiskwis lodge won the 2012 OA National Service Award.

== See also ==
- Scouting in Washington
