= Denny Party =

19th-century American pioneers; founders of Seattle, Washington

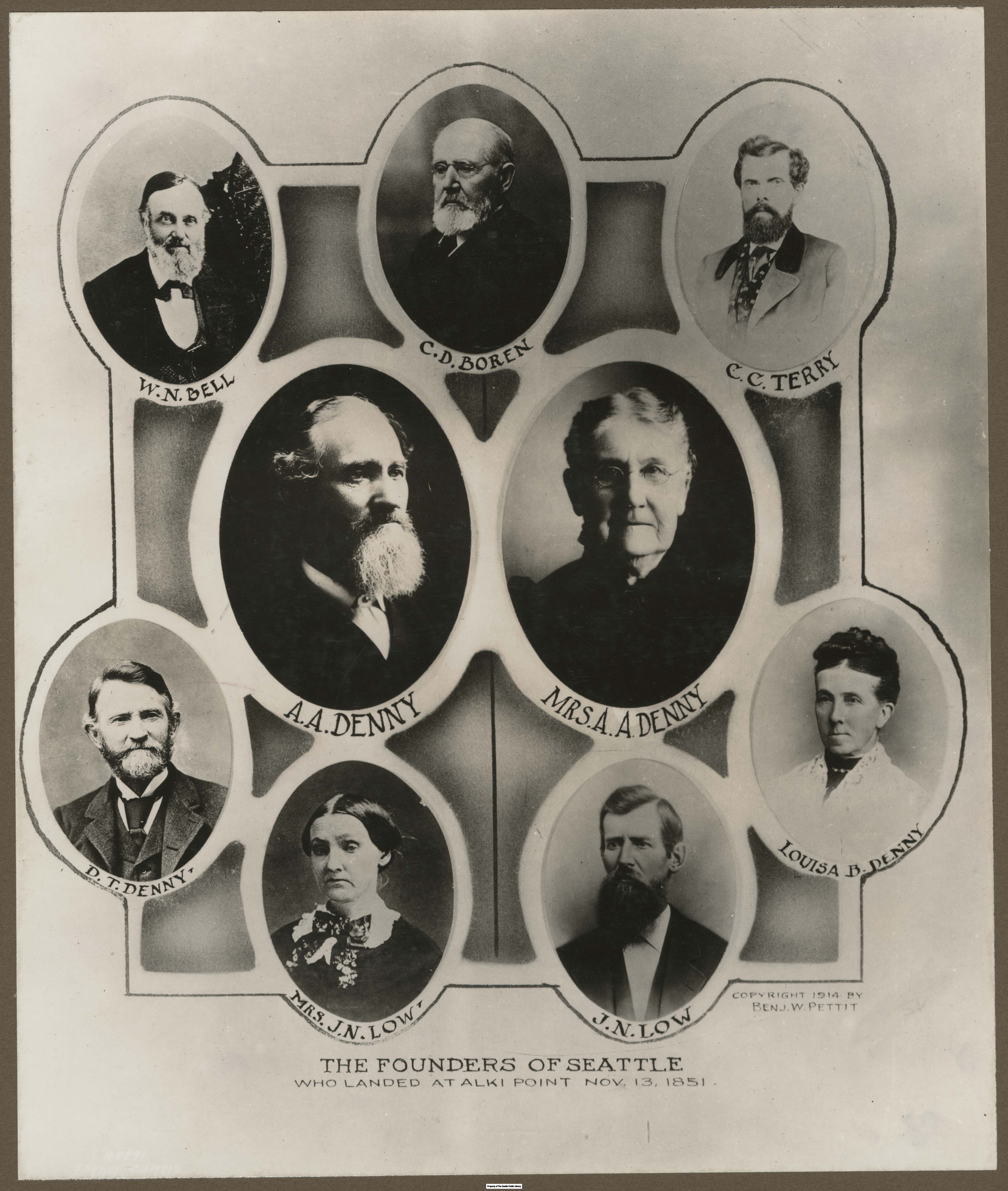
Members of the Denny Party in a 1914 composite photo

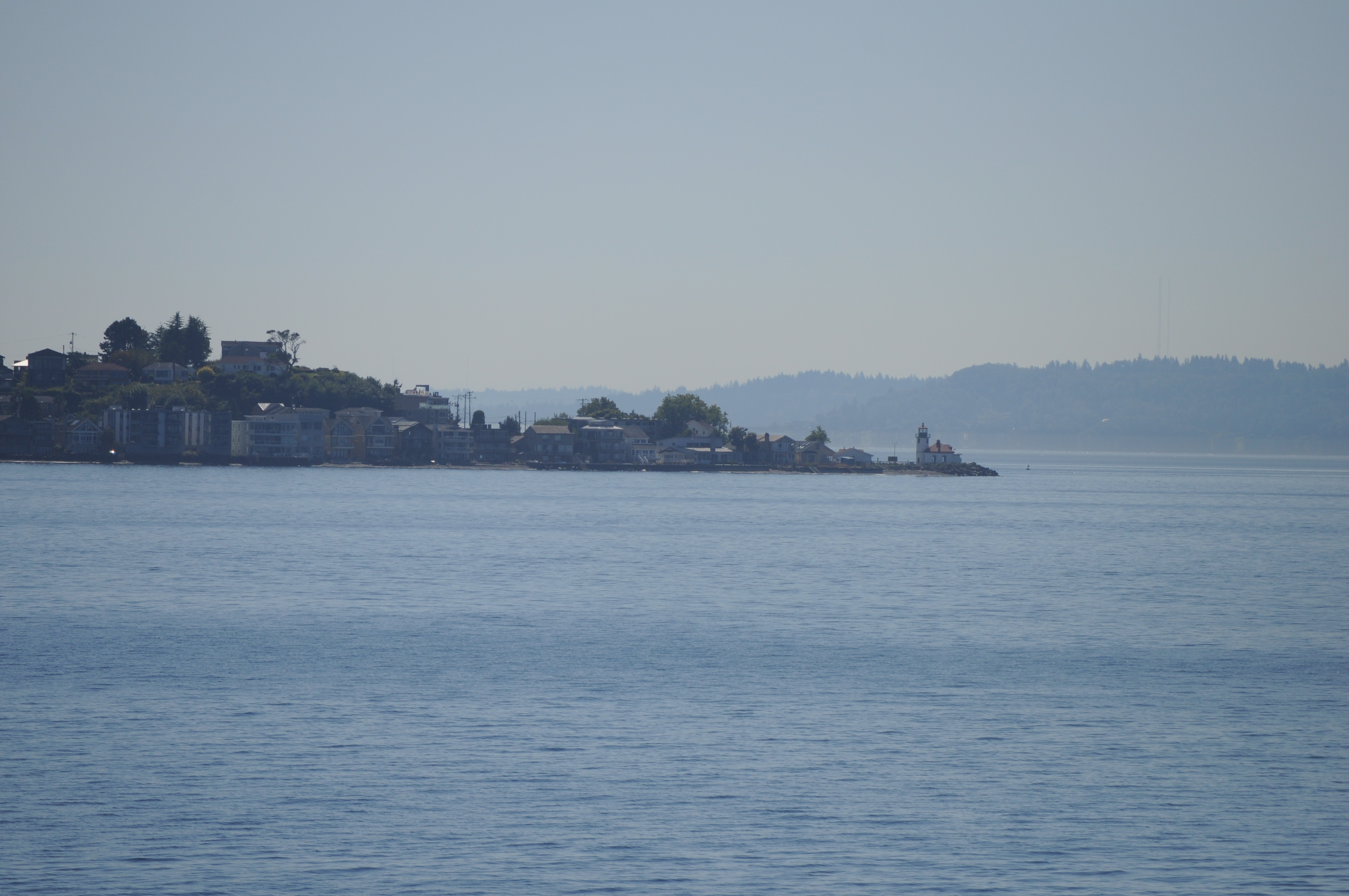
Alki Point in 2011, where the Denny Party made their initial land claims

The Denny Party were a group of American pioneers credited with founding Seattle, Washington, in 1851.

Originally from Cherry Grove, Illinois, the party began their journey west on April 10, 1851, led by 29-year-old Arthur A. Denny. Four months later, they arrived in Portland, Oregon and, upon hearing of the remote Puget Sound, sent David Denny, John Low, and Lee Terry to scout for land there. The remainder of the party, consisting of 24 people total, arrived at Alki Point on November 13, 1851, where they would remain until relocating across Elliott Bay in April 1852.

The second settlement, established at present-day Pioneer Square, grew into the city of Seattle, which became the largest city in the Pacific Northwest by 1910.

== History ==
On April 10, 1851, a wagon party headed by Arthur A. Denny left Cherry Grove, Illinois and headed west. The party included Arthur Denny's father John Denny, his stepmother, two of his older brothers who ultimately settled in the Willamette Valley of Oregon, his younger brother David Denny, his wife, Mary Ann Boren, Mary's younger sister Louisa, and their brother Carson Boren. Mary Ann Denny and was pregnant throughout the journey and Mary Ann's sister Louisa Boren ultimately married David Denny in 1861.

On July 6, 1851, the party battled Native Americans at American Falls, Idaho on the Snake River, but escaped unharmed. The following day they met John Low, and he joined the party. Late in July 1851 they reached the Burnt River in eastern Oregon where they encountered a man named Brock who suggested to Denny that Puget Sound would be a good place to create a town.

The Denny Party arrived in Portland, Oregon on August 22, 1851. Arthur Denny was ill and Mary Ann was about to give birth so the party convalesced in Portland. On September 2, Mary gave birth to a son, Rolland H. Denny.

John Low and David Denny headed north to scout the possibilities. Along the way they were joined by Leander "Lee" Terry. In newly founded Olympia, Washington, they met Michael Simmons, the wealthy founder of Tumwater. He guided them to Alki to scout as a possible site for a settlement. On September 28, 1851, at Alki, Terry and Low began building a cabin with help from the local Native Americans and then staked claims to the land. They decided to name their new village New York. Low returned to Portland to alert the others, Terry looked for a froe to make redcedar shake shingles, and David Denny stayed on in the unfinished cabin. David Denny hurt his leg and was unable to complete the roof of the cabin.

In Portland, Arthur Denny recruited Illinois farmer William Nathaniel Bell and his wife, and, by coincidence, Charlie Terry, Leander's younger brother. The Terry brothers, from Waterville, New York, had come west as part of the California Gold Rush, but had not liked the rough and tumble of San Francisco.

On November 5, 1851, the Denny Party left Portland on the schooner Exact, bound for Puget Sound and Haida Gwaii. The Exact carried a number of settlers bound for Puget Sound in addition to the Denny Party, including Daniel Bigelow who settled in Olympia. After a difficult passage, particularly hard on the still-ill Denny, they arrived at Alki on November 13, where David greeted them with the words, "I wish you hadn't come."

Arthur Denny was bitterly disappointed that Low and Lee Terry had already staked the relevant claims for Alki. However, with no other shelter in the midst of heavy rainfall, he had no choice but to pitch in, finish the cabin and settle in for the winter. Denny convinced Bell and Boren that they needed to scout a different location. Once the worst of winter cleared, Denny and other party members explored as far as Commencement Bay (now the site of Tacoma), Port Orchard, Smith Cove, and up the Duwamish River to the present site of Puyallup, before settling on an island in the mudflats near the east shore of Elliott Bay, now the site of Pioneer Square.

For the next three years Alki Point and Elliott Bay sites competed as rival townsites. Charlie Terry bought out his brother's and Low's Alki holdings and led this community. Arthur Denny settled at Elliott Bay and, along with his rival D.S. "Doc" Maynard, led the development of Seattle. Terry and Low could not attract settlers to their townsite and people facetiously began calling the smaller village "New York Alki" or "New York bye and bye" in Chinook Jargon.

== Monument ==
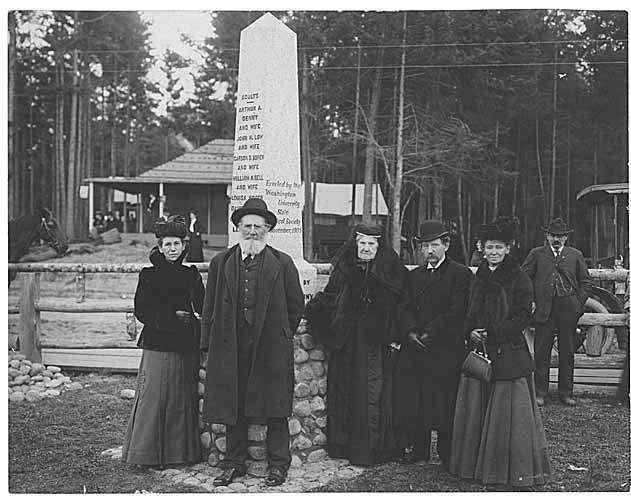
Seattle pioneers at the dedication of the Alki Point Monument - Left to right: Lenora Denny, Carson D. Boren, Mary A. Denny, Rolland H. Denny, and Mary Low Sinclair on November 13, 1905

The Birthplace of Seattle Monument at Alki Beach is inscribed with the names of all members of the Denny Party.
