= Bonaparte Lake =

Lake in Washington, United States

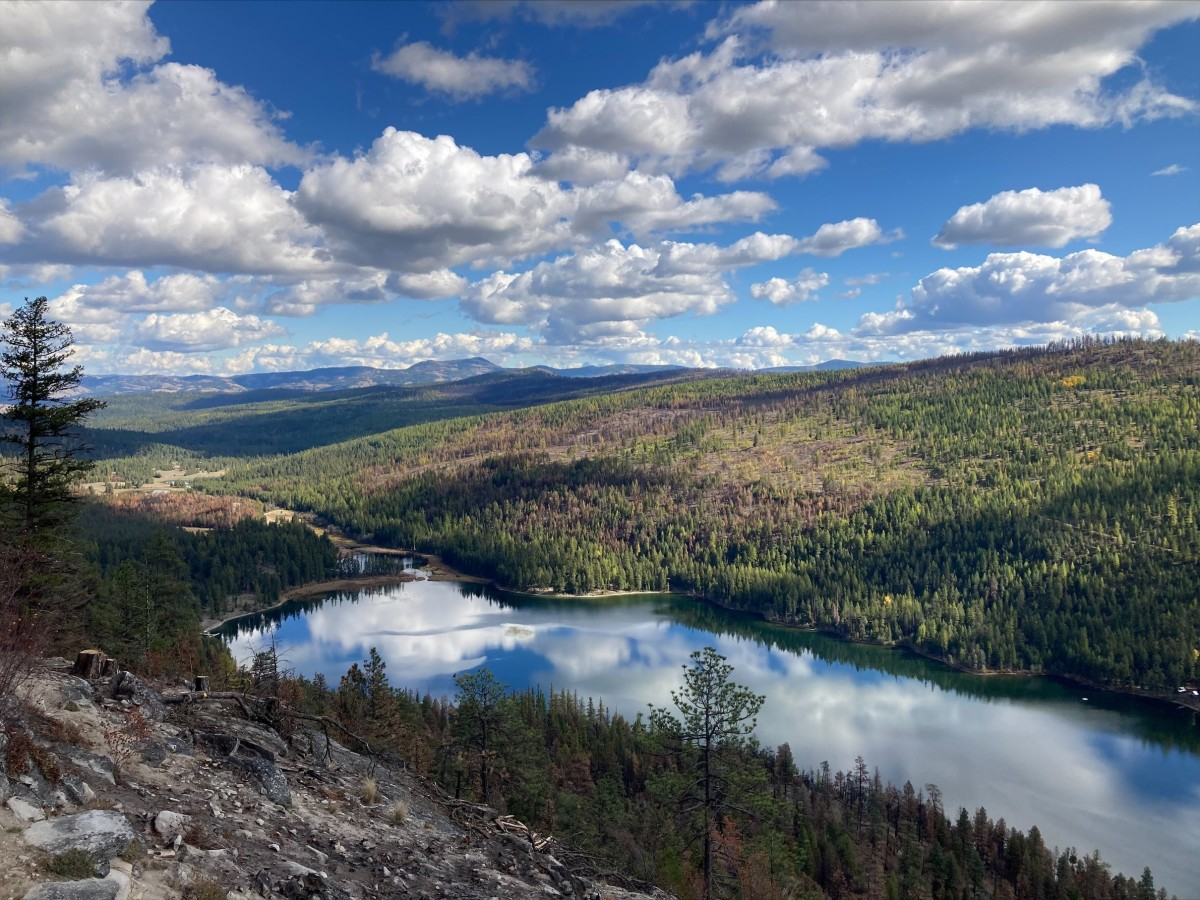
- Bonaparte lake in the fall

- Location within Washington (state)
- location of Bonaparte Lake
- Location: Northeast of Tonasket, Washington, US
- Coordinates: 48°48′0″N 119°3′18″W
- Type: high altitude freshwater & Impoundment
- Part of: Bonaparte Creek watershed
- Primary inflows: Bonaparte Creek
- Primary outflows: Bonaparte Creek
- Basin countries: United States
- Max. length: 1 mi (1.6 km)
- Max. width: 1,500 ft (460 m)
- Surface area: 158.74 acres (64.24 ha)
- Max. depth: 110 ft (34 m)
- Water volume: 995.5 acre⋅ft (1,227,900 m^{3})
- Shore length^{1}: 3.71 mi (5.97 km)
- Surface elevation: 3,556 ft (1,084 m)
- Frozen: December - April/May
- Islands: 0
- ^{1} Shore length is not a well-defined measure.

Bonaparte Lake is a freshwater lake in the northwestern Okanogan Highlands of Washington, United States. It is the largest lake in the Bonaparte Creek watershed and is both fed and drained by said creek. The lake is at the eastern foot of Mount Bonaparte and abuts the Bonaparte Meadows calcareous fen. The lake was formed by a partial blockage of the valley mouth by glacial debris at the end of the Fraser Glaciation and the deep peat deposits of the Bonaparte Meadows preserve ash falls from Mount Mazama and Mount St Helens. The lake is about 1 mi (1.6 km) long with a north–south directionality while a land neck separates the southern 1/3 into a smaller basin from the remaining 2/3 in the northern area. A maximum depth for the lake is 109 ft (33 m) while the area is 158.7 acres (64.2 ha).

The lake provides boating and sport fishing opportunities facilitated by the Colville National Forest campground on the southern shore, the public resort on the eastern shore, and the Scouting America camp on the northern shore. Cold winter temperatures allow for deep lake ice formation and ice fishing in the central winter months.

The flora of the lake and meadows is diverse with nonvascular plants like mosses, liverworts, and lichens. Aquatic plants include several pond weeds, possibly two water-lillies, and a scattering of others single species taxa. Diverse grasses, sedges, and rushes are found across the marsh and around the lake. Aspens, birch, maple, pine and spruce grow as scattered individual trees, small groves, and comprise the surrounding forest.

The fauna known from the lake area is sparsely documented, with scattered reports for snails, spiders, insects, birds, and amphibians. The most documented are the mammals and the fish. Of the invertebrates, a single snail and a few scattered insects are known, while a restricted but diverse spider fauna including trap-door spiders are present. Fish species found in its waters include trout, salmon, and freshwater bass. The tributaries of the lake are considered likely habitats for native kokanee, while non-native trout have been planted since at least the 1930s. Due to the history of stocking, the true genetic origins of upper Bonaparte watershed salmonids is considered clouded. The lake is one of several in the state where nesting Common loons and black terns are present in the summer while reports of both sea ducks and Phalarope have been made. The meadows are a known habitat for the Washington species of concern Columbia spotted frog. Mammals using the area include herbivores like moose and deer, three felines, two canines, a mustelid and a bear.

The area has a known history of wildfires, with large blazes in 1977 and 2021. Despite the threat of fires yearly, the larger area is not part of any Okanogan county fire district, and is instead overseen by the Washington State Department of Natural Resources which maintains mutual aid agreements with multiple other organizations.

Human use of the area has been varied in nature, originally being part of the ancestral lands used by the Syilx peoples prior to the creation of the Colville Indian Reservation. A low agricultural and residential use dam was built on the south end of the lake for water diversion in the early 1900s. The region was included in a state game reserve for nearly ten years before the reserve was decommissioned in favor of hunting use. Two campground areas, a national forest camp and a scout camp, plus an public resort are on the shores. Annual trout stocking has occurred since at least the 1930s for fishing, with ice fishing becoming popular in the late 2000s.

== Location and access ==
Bonaparte Lake is in the upper reaches of the Bonaparte Creek drainage basin, a subbasin of the Okanogan River, itself part of the greater Columbia River drainage. The lake is at the southeastern foot of the 7,259.5 feet (2,212.7 m) Mount Bonaparte, the highest mountain in the Washington section of the Okanagan Highlands and one of the highest peaks in the greater Okanagan Highlands. The mountain rises between the unincorporated communities of Havillah and Wauconda, while the closest cities are Tonasket to the southwest and Republic to the southeast.

The southern end of Lake Bonaparte is 5.7 mi (9.2 km) north of SR 20 on County Road #4953 which then transitions to Forest service road 32. The road runs along the eastern shore of the lake and provides access to private residences and the lakes area north of Bonaparte. The area surrounding the lake is 95% National forest managed, and 5% Department of natural resources. Two motorized boat launches service the lake, both at the southern end, on the south and the southeastern shores. The shores are host to aquatic plant growth and easy water access is limited to the national forest campground and the private resort.

The lake was accessible by automobiles on roads passing though Molson or Republic as early as 1920. The lake was already regionally noted in 1920 for the fishing opportunities and for camping.

== Dimensions and depth ==
The lake is approximately 1 mi (1.6 km) long and trends generally south to north, with the northern area of the lake transitioning into emergent wetlands complexes, providing connectivity to a series of small lakes north of Bonaparte. In 2007 the lake acreage was given as 158.7 acres (64.2 ha) and a water line elevation of 3,554 ft (1,083 m). The water is clear and the lake bottom is a gravel and silt mix. A majority of the lake as a whole is deep, having shallows only near the central necks and Bonaparte Creeks outflow in the south, while in the north there is a central marked shallow and shallows associated with a bay in the northeast corner. The average depth of the south half is 60 ft (18 m) with a maximum of 75 ft (23 m). In the northern half the deepest sections of the lake bottom out at 109 ft (33 m). Near the center of the lake a neck of land extends from both shores, with the northern section larger than the southern section, with two-thirds in the north half and one third in the south.

== Geology ==
Bonaparte Lake was formed at the end of the most recent ice-age. The valley opening was damned by glacial moraine deposits dropped from the melting Okanagan ice lobe. Subsequent to the valley infilling with lake waters areas at both the northern inflow and southern outflow experienced peat moss growth with gradual transition to peat fen. The southern section of what formerly was lake has fully transitioned into the Bonaparte meadows fen, through which Bonaparte Creek drains before leaving the valley fully. The peat deposits have been subjected to small scale mining for local sale since the 1950s. A 10 acres (4.0 ha) section on the northern end of the lake has shifted to a swamp biome which overlies peat deposits. The surface area has a 2–3 ft (0.61–0.91 m) water layer with a growth of aquatic vegetation, while the underlaying peats area between 5–12 ft (1.5–3.7 m) deep.

Examination of the peat areas of Washington by George Rigg, an expert in bogs and wetland ecology indicated the Okanogan Highlands, defined as from the eastern border of the Cascades to the Washington-Idaho border, had the second most extensive peat deposits of the state after the Puget Sound area. The expanded highlands hosts about 14% of Washingtons peatlands in 44 distinct sites. Rigg noted the distribution of pumicite in the bog suggested that the thick layering near the bog edges was due to sedimentation from surrounding the bog after the pumicite fall initially happened, with the center area of the bog showing a thinner total deposition layer. Bore-holes made by Rigg indicated total peat depths ranging between 15–20 ft (4.6–6.1 m) in the deepest parts of the meadows, with a sedimentary peat layer up to 7 ft (2.1 m) thick and some pumicite layers up to 1 ft (0.30 m) thick. Rigg attributed all the pumicite deposits as most likely from the 6,000 year Glacier Peak eruption. The basement layers of the bog are underlaid by gravels, clays and course sands.

Investigation of the Bonaparte Meadows floral history in 1979 by Mack, Rutter, and Valastro reidentified the pumicite deposits in the meadow area as three distinct falls from two separate volcanic events, neither of which was the Glacier Peak eruptions. The older two falls are both from the 6,800 ybp catastrophic Mount Mazama eruption which started the formation of Crater Lake. The older fall is comprised of fine silt sized particles, while the younger fall is larger sand size particles with a measurable amount of phenocrysts. A third and fainter deposit was found in the uppermost zone of the fen, and

== Climate ==
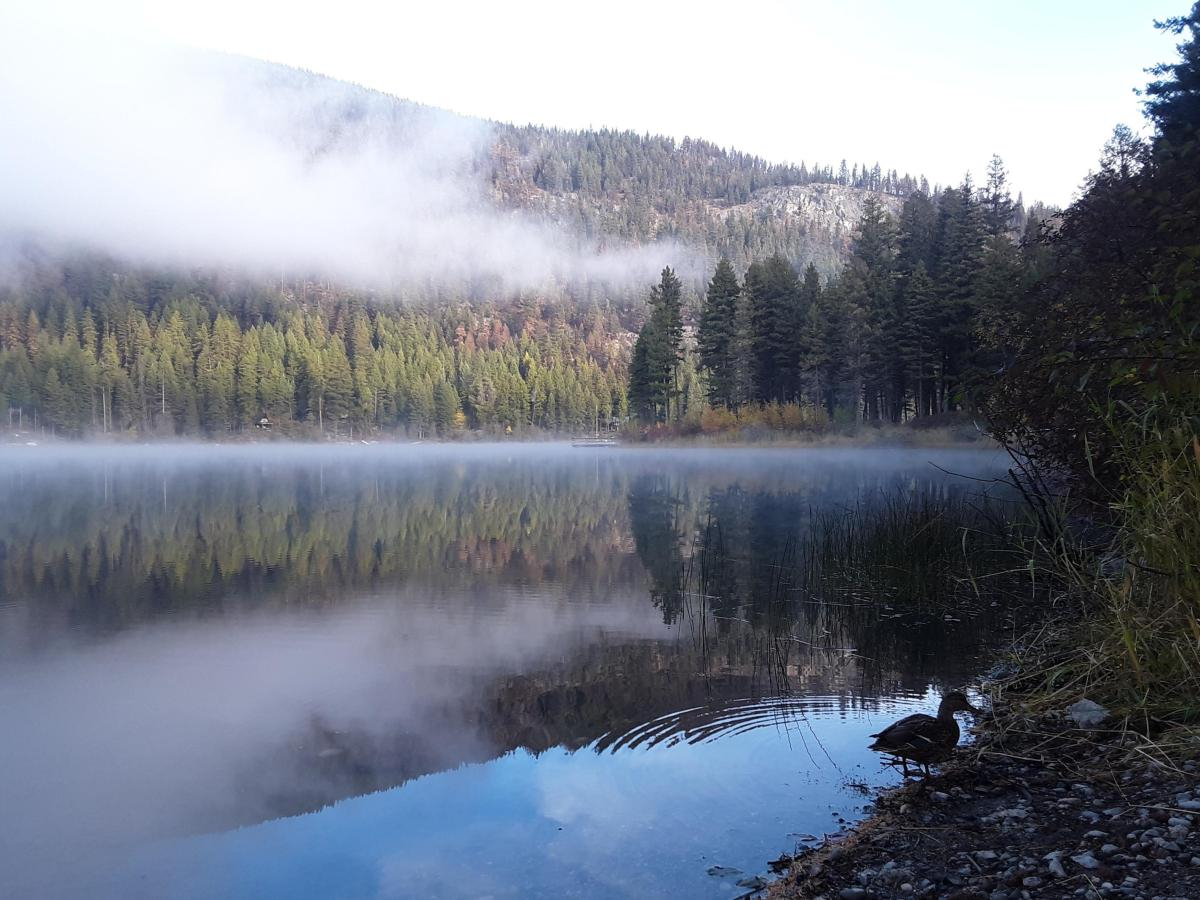
Morning mist and clouds over lake

Within the Köppen climate classification the area of northeastern Okanogan County has a humid continental climate (Dfb). The 30-year average temperature is 41.5 °F (5.3 °C), with an average yearly high of 63.1 °F (17.3 °C) in August, and an average low of 21.4 °F (−5.9 °C) in December. The average rainfall is 18.59 in (472 mm) per year. The wettest month is June, with 2.34 in (59 mm) of precipitation, while the driest is August, with 0.72 in (18 mm).

Climate data for Mount Bonaparte 48.7659 N, -119.0679 W, Elevation: 3,556 ft (1,084 m) (1991–2020 normals)
Month	Jan	Feb	Mar	Apr	May	Jun	Jul	Aug	Sep	Oct	Nov	Dec	Year
Mean daily maximum °F (°C)	28.9 (−1.7)	34.7 (1.5)	42.3 (5.7)	51.0 (10.6)	61.3 (16.3)	67.0 (19.4)	77.0 (25.0)	77.7 (25.4)	68.1 (20.1)	52.3 (11.3)	36.0 (2.2)	27.6 (−2.4)	52.0 (11.1)
Daily mean °F (°C)	22.2 (−5.4)	25.9 (−3.4)	32.5 (0.3)	40.1 (4.5)	49.3 (9.6)	54.9 (12.7)	63.0 (17.2)	63.1 (17.3)	54.6 (12.6)	42.0 (5.6)	29.3 (−1.5)	21.4 (−5.9)	41.5 (5.3)
Mean daily minimum °F (°C)	15.4 (−9.2)	17.0 (−8.3)	22.7 (−5.2)	29.2 (−1.6)	37.3 (2.9)	42.8 (6.0)	48.9 (9.4)	48.5 (9.2)	41.0 (5.0)	31.8 (−0.1)	22.6 (−5.2)	15.1 (−9.4)	31.0 (−0.5)
Average precipitation inches (mm)	1.8 (46)	1.41 (36)	1.44 (37)	1.53 (39)	2.02 (51)	2.34 (59)	1.13 (29)	0.72 (18)	0.87 (22)	1.31 (33)	1.88 (48)	2.14 (54)	18.59 (472)
Source: PRISM Climate Group

The lake freezes over during the winter, with thick enough ice layer developing by January to support ice fishing. On average the ice cover starts to melt off during April though the timing is variable, and is typically fully gone by May. Historic reporting from 1917 documented Bonaparte Lake and other lakes in the area were still covered in ice as of reporting on May 11, while rivers and creeks surrounding were running high.

== Ecology ==
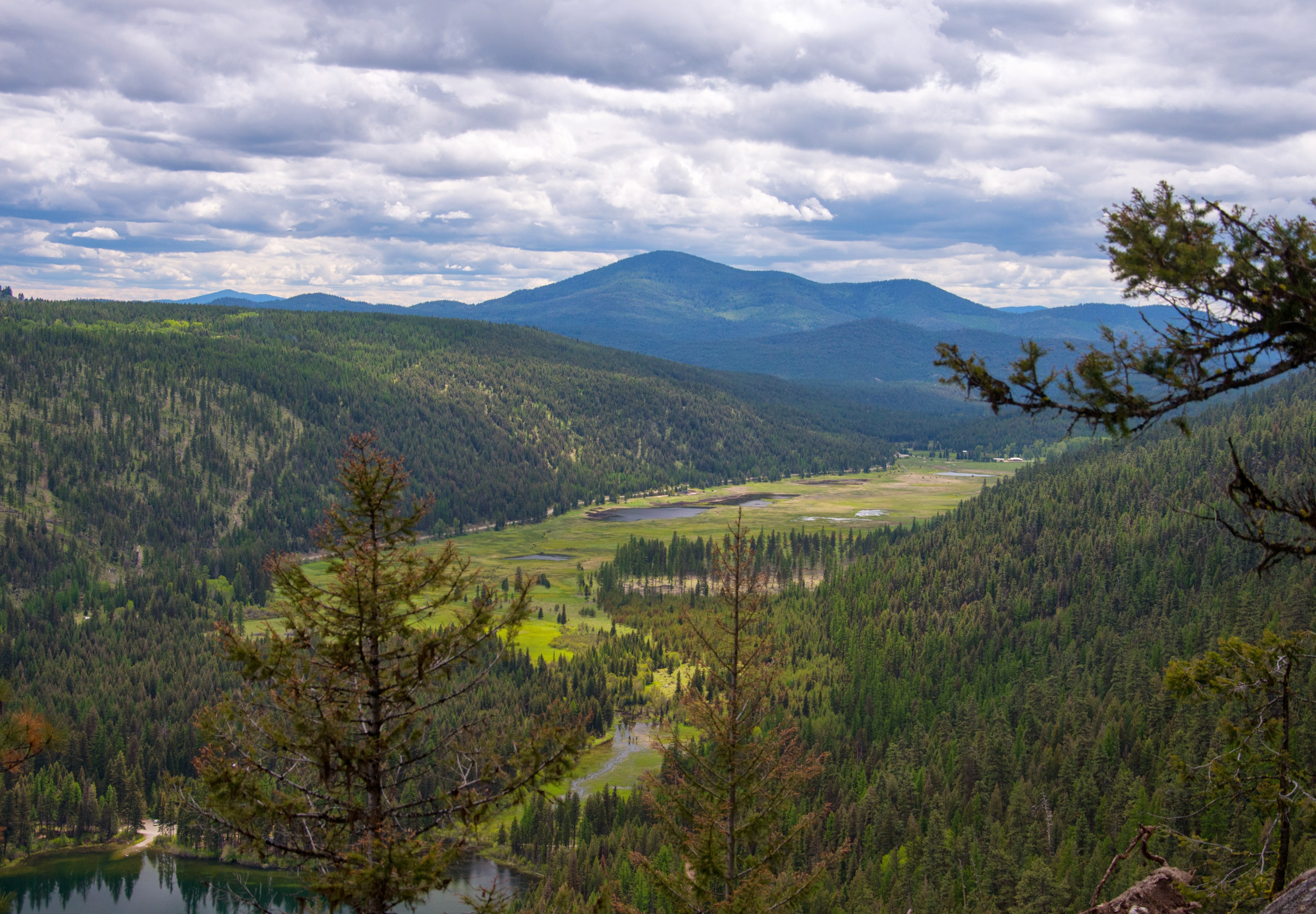
Bonaparte Meadows with the lake and National forest campground in forround

Located in the transition zone from lowland Okanogan basin Ponderosa pine forest and mid elevation mixed conifer forest. The ponderosa pine zone is found between 1,500–3,000 ft (460–910 m) in elevation, though the higher elevation areas are often restricted to south facing slopes or ridge lines. The general appearance is open and park-like with widely scattered old growth trees. Frequent ground fires maintain the open park nature, with isolated groves of young ponderosa or Douglas fir acting as nexus points of tree regeneration. The mid elevation mixed conifer forests are typically found between 2,000–5,500 ft (610–1,680 m) and cover most slopes and aspects of the terrane. In these Douglas fir dominated forests the structure ranges between open and park-like though dense stands with multistory canopies. When understory tress are present in the forests, they are dominated by shade tolerant species such as grand fir or young Douglas fir. When the forest is of mixed density to open, additional tree diversity is found with lodgepole pine, western white pine, and western larch.

Bonaparte Lake was evaluated in accordance with the Washington State Department of Natural Resources Aquatic Reserve program expansion survey, and detailed in the 2017 initial survey report. major criteria included species concentration, rarity, and diversity of species, also importance to Washington bird species. Plants were looked at in terms of community diversity and species rarity. In addition to species parameters the overall body of water was assessed based on connection to other protected areas, such as wetlands, terrestrial, or fluvial environments. A group of only ten lakes were singled out as potential aquatic reserve bodies, with Bonaparte Lake the only lake in the Okanogan Highlands, and one of four lakes in northeastern Washington. The primary criterion for inclusion was it being an annual nesting site for Common loons and one of only two nesting areas that are fully on state owned aquatic land. Two other species of interest were called out as focus species. The lake is also a nesting site for black terns, and is a native waterbody for Kokanee trout which spawn in the lake tributaries.

=== Historic floral succession ===
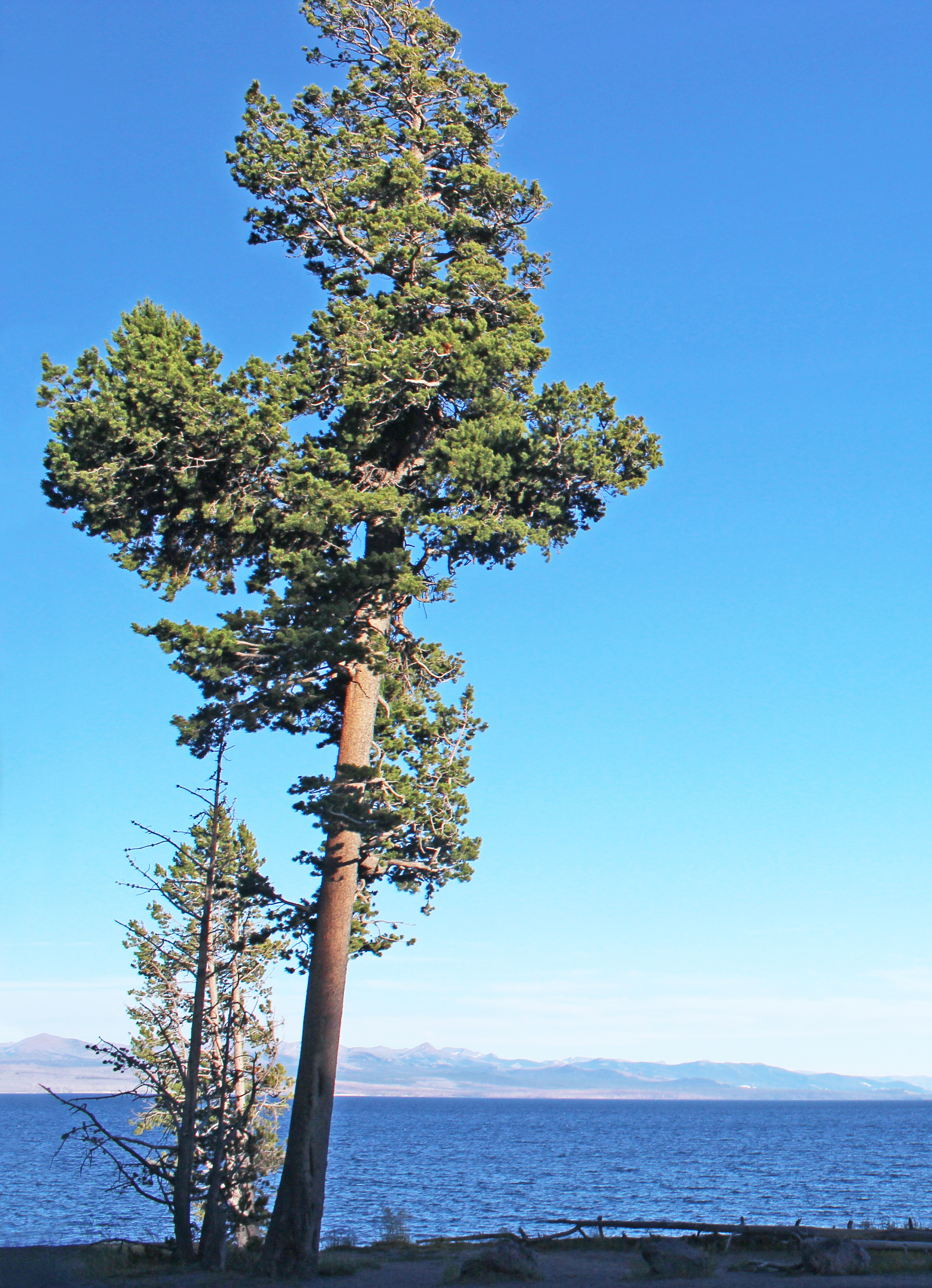
A lodgepole pine

Evaluation of the Bonaparte meadows flora was conducted in 1972, detailed by Richard Mack, N. Rutter, and S. Valastro in a 1979 paper documenting vegetational succession of the area. A new full depth core sample was taken from the fen and sieved for pollens along with detailing sedimentation changes. The oldest section of the core was dated via ^{14}C to around 10000±220 years ago and the youngest date was 1480±60 years ago. The research group documented four distinct pollen zones within the core showing floral transitions over the past 10,000 years of the fens history, with the third zone subdivided into two units. Mack and coauthors also determined that three distinct ash fall events are present in the bog, none of which actually corresponded to any Glacier Peak eruptions.

The oldest zone, Zone I, is dominated by sagebrush shrubs sedges, and grasses, with haploxylon white pines, related to whitebark pine and western white pine, likely as a scattered uncommon tree element. This sagebrush-pine steppe ecology is noted to be a very common initial post glacial community across western North America. Around 10,000 ybp is the transition into Zone II, which lasted until about 6,900 ybp. The new assemblage has a higher volume of non-tree pollens with a sagebrush, grass, and sedge composition along with pines. The pines shift over to diploxylon yellow or hard pine, related to lodgepoles or ponderosa pines. Similarly the sagebrush is assumed to have shifted to either basin big sagebrush or threetip sagebrush, and not the original colonizing species.

Zone III is divided into two named subunits Zone IIIa and Zone IIIb, which are separated by deposition gap with an estimated time span around 1,000 years long. Zone IIIa has a notable drop in sagebrush pollen and a spike in sedge (Carex) species. The sedge spike is bracketed by two distinct ashfalls from the 6,800 ybp catastrophic Mount Mazama eruption. The estimated period between the two falls was a span of just under 200 years. Between Zone IIIa and IIIb is a depositional disconformity which lasted an estimated 1,000 years. No definite evidence for the cause of the gap is preserved, but Mack and coauthors postulated it corresponded to a drop in the water table with resulting drying and shrinking of the sediments in question. The gap corresponds to record gaps seen in the Sanpoil and Priest River Valleys. The flora of the zone returns to the sagebrush-grass-sedge dominated ecology seen in Zone II and the climate was likely wetter and warmer then before.

The most recent Zone IV started around 4,800 ybp and spans until present. At the beginning of the zone, the meadows experienced a drastic flora shift, with sagebrush disappearing, and hard pine with likely Douglas fir dominating the early part of the zone. This shift is considered the origin point for the modern forests blanketing mountains around Bonaparte Lake and meadows now.

=== Bonaparte Meadows ===
The southern section of what formerly was Bonaparte Lake has fully transitioned into the Bonaparte meadows fen, through which Bonaparte Creek drains before leaving the upper valley. When visited by Rigg in July 1949, the meadows had two small ponds, and some standing water over parts of the meadow surface. Rigg estimated the peat bog encompassed an area of approximately 282 acres (114 ha) in a generally north–south outline. The general surface plants were sedges and some aquatics, and old wire construction fencing suggested the area had been used a grazing land before that date. The peat deposits have been subjected to small scale mining for local sale since the 1950s. A late 1970s estimate gave a total area of about 280 acres (110 ha) of meadow underlain by the peat deposits, and an estimated volume around 6.5×10^{6} cu ft (1.8×10^{5} m^{3}).

In the early 2020s efforts led by the Okanogan Land Trust built to conserve the Bonaparte meadows wetlands at the southeastern foot of Mount Bonaparte. The wetlands is located on Bonaparte Creek just downstream from Bonaparte Lake and was confirmed to be a calcareous fen, rare in Washington State, in 2025. The ecosystem is home for rare plant species from groups like the asters, sedges, and willows. A donation to the conservation effort in 2026 of $50,000 was made by the North Central Washington Audubon Society.

=== Flora ===
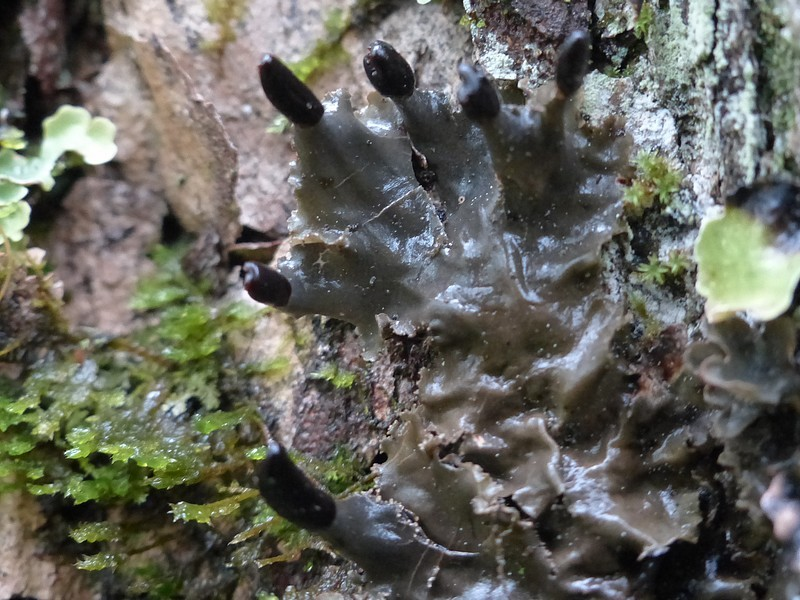
The black saddle pelt lichen

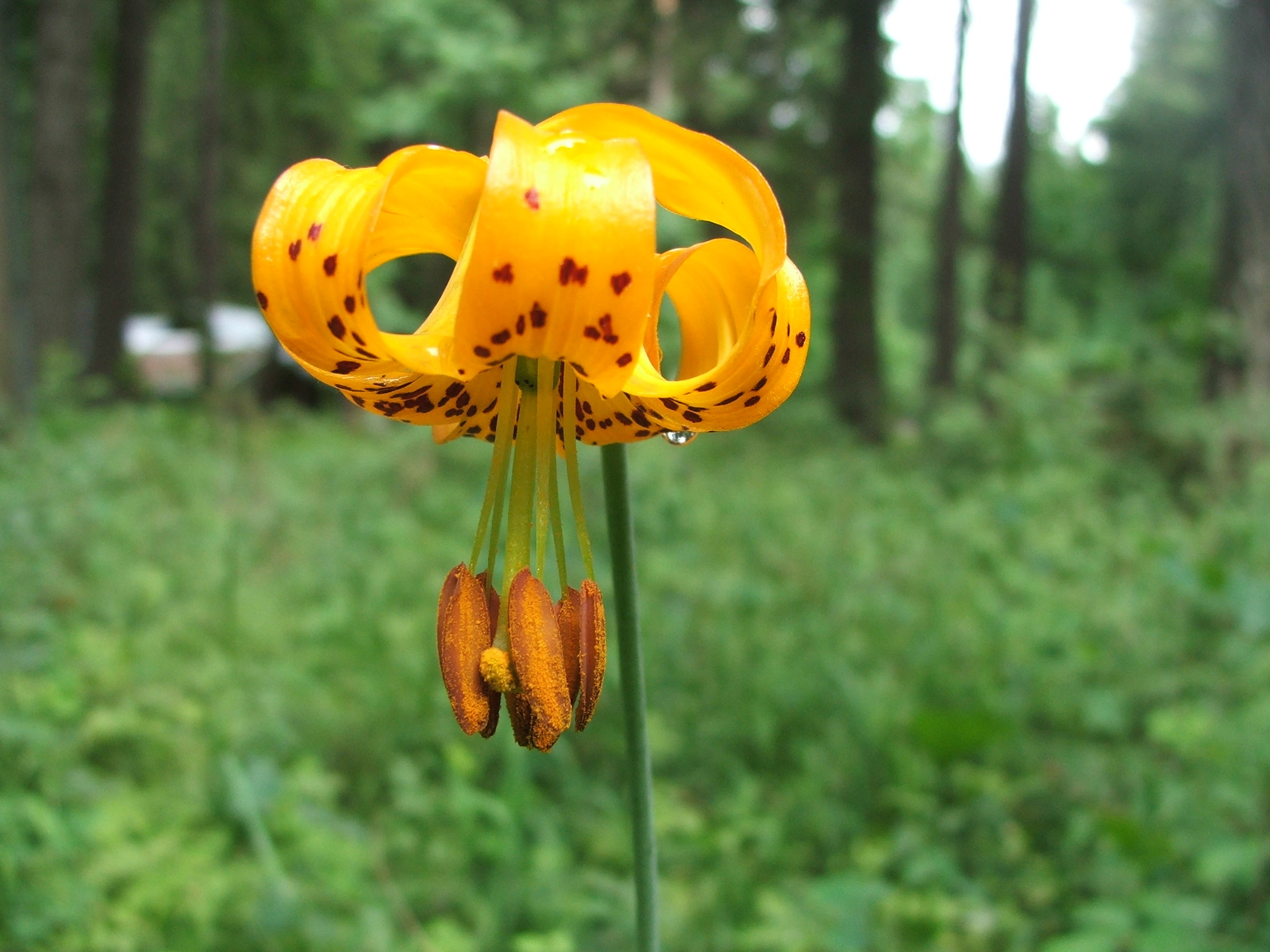
A Columbia tiger lilly flower

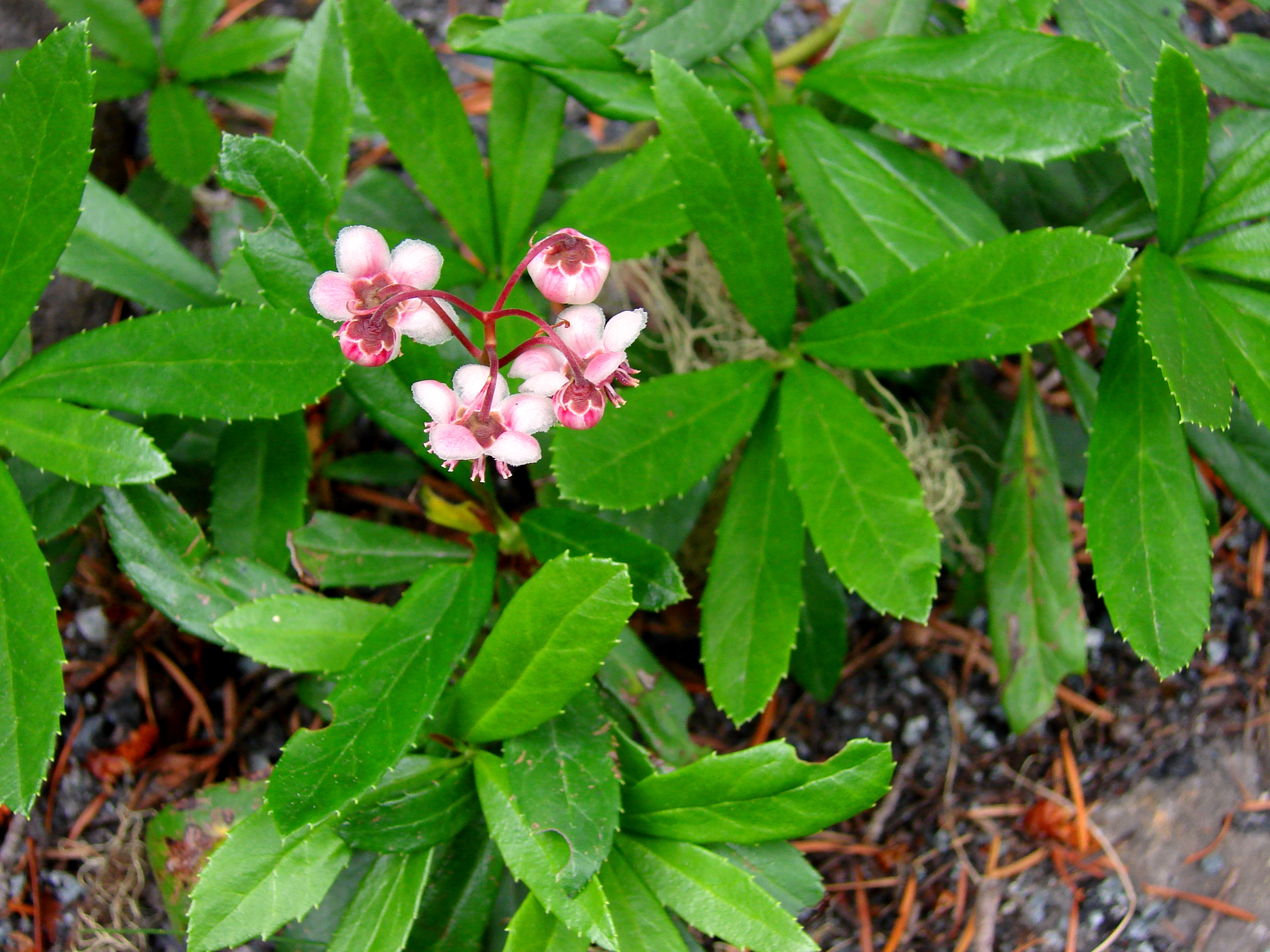
A group of pipsissewa

Herbarium collecting in and around the lake has been undertaken a number of times in the 20th century, with trips happening in the 1921, 1960, 1963, 2000, and 2017. A number of different plant groups have been reported in and around the lake and the greater surrounding wetlands and fen zones.

While the Bonaparte Creek drainage includes all four major forest types of the Okanogan basin, Bonaparte Lake is within the mid elevation mixed conifer forests typically found between 2,000–5,500 ft (610–1,680 m) and covering most slopes and aspects of the terrane. In these Douglas fir dominated forests the structure ranges between open and park-like though dense stands with multistory canopies. When understory tress are present in the forests, they are dominated by shade tolerant species such as grand fir or young Douglas fir. When the forest is of mixed density to open, additional tree diversity is found with lodgepole, western white pine, and western larch.

The valley floor of Bonaparte meadows is occupied by a blue-bunch grass - big sagebrush prairie and a fen meadow along Bonaparte Creek. Around the margins of the meadow fen scattered successional groves of Engelmann spruce, paper birch, and quaking aspen grow while the lower slopes of the valley sides have typical mid elevation mixed conifer forest including a ponderosa pine component. Around the lake edge are mountain alder, Rocky Mountain maple, and black cottonwood. Three woody shrubs are components of the ecosystem there common juniper, Oregon boxleaf, and mallow ninebark.

The mosses are the most diverse of the nonvascular plants, with specimens of the families Amblystegiaceae (8 species), Aongstroemiaceae (1 species), Brachytheciaceae (1 species), Bryaceae (2 species), Mniaceae (1 species), and Pottiaceae (2 species). Within the family Amblystegiaceae, the species identified come from Amblystegium, the creeping feathermoss, of which two unique varieties A. serpens var. juratzkanum and A. serpens ver. serpens. The Drepanocladus hook-mosses include four different species; Common hook-moss D. aduncus var. aduncus, Longleaf hook moss D. capillifolius, Fertile feathermoss D. polygamus, and Chalk hook-moss D. sendtneri. The two other genera are each present with a single species, Leptodictyum with Kneiff's feathermoss L. riparium and Scorpidium with Rusty hook-moss S. revolvens. Family Bryaceae has two species documented, both in the type genus Bryum, Silver moss B. argenteum and Marsh bryum B. pseudotriquetrum. Pottia mosses of the family Pottiaceae is also present with two Syntrichia screw/twisted moss species, Bartram's screw moss S. bartramii and twisted moss S. ruralis. Families Brachytheciaceae and Mniaceae each have a single reported species, Brachythecium with the Taiga ragged moss B. erythrorrhizon and Plagiomnium with marsh thyme-moss P. ellipticum respectively.

A mixed series of other nonvascular plants have been collected in the area including lichens and one liverwort species, the large-spored apopellia Apopellia megaspora. Within the lichens, three genera are known, but only two are identified to species, black saddle pelt and the many-spored camouflage lichen. A rosette lichen in the genus Physcia is also reported. A small group of ferns are present in the collected herbarium materials, with the moonwort species Botrychium minganense, the cliff fern Rocky mountain woodsia, and the swamp horsetail.

Water-lilies, genus Nuphar, are found in the lake, with identification of the specimens diverging, with both great yellow pond-lily and possible hybrids of variegated pond-lily and great yellow pond-lily. Additional aquatic species include Potamogeton pond weed with three species, the flat-stalked, the straight-leaf, and the small pondweeds. A series of single species families are present, with marsh yellow-cress in Brassicaceae, marsh skullcap in Lamiaceae, bog willowherb in Onagraceae, bog candle in Orchidaceae, spiny water starwort in Plantaginaceae, and marsh cinquefoil in Rosaceae.

Monocots are fairly diverse with four grasses, three sedges, two rushes, and two lilies. Grasses are present, with two different tribes of pooid cool-season grasses each with two species. American mannagrass and boreal mannagrass are members of tribe Meliceae, while tribe Poeae has two different genera western fescue in Festuca and bluejoint in Calamagrostis. The three Carex sedges are the northern Bebb's sedge, the western Chamisso sedge, and circum-boreal water sedge. While similar looking to sedges, both the alpine and swordleaf rushes are in the family Juncaceae. Along with the grass-like taxa, two lily species are present, with the large flowered Columbia Tiger lily and the small flowered roughfruit fairybells. while one orchid species northern coralroot is documented.

Two hemiparasitic herbs in the family Orobanchaceae occur in the lake edge or fen area. Bracted lousewort is a broadly unselective hemiparasite, which will attach to any nearby root systems. In contrast the grasses support arctic yellow rattle, which only feeds from Poaceae species. The heath and rhododendron family shows in area with three herbaceous species, pipsissewa, the snowline wintergreen, and the wax-flower. The sunflower family and the buttercup family have two reported species each, white hawkweed plus yarrow from the former, while Gmelin's buttercup and yellow columbine represent the latter. A Brassicaceous mustard relative, Pennsylvania bittercress, a honeysuckle relative red twinberry, and the legume species large-leaved lupine are all known. Primulaceae, Phrymaceae, and Saxifragaceae also are single species members of the flora, with tufted loosestrife, shy monkeyflower, and three-leaf foamflower.

=== Invertebrates ===
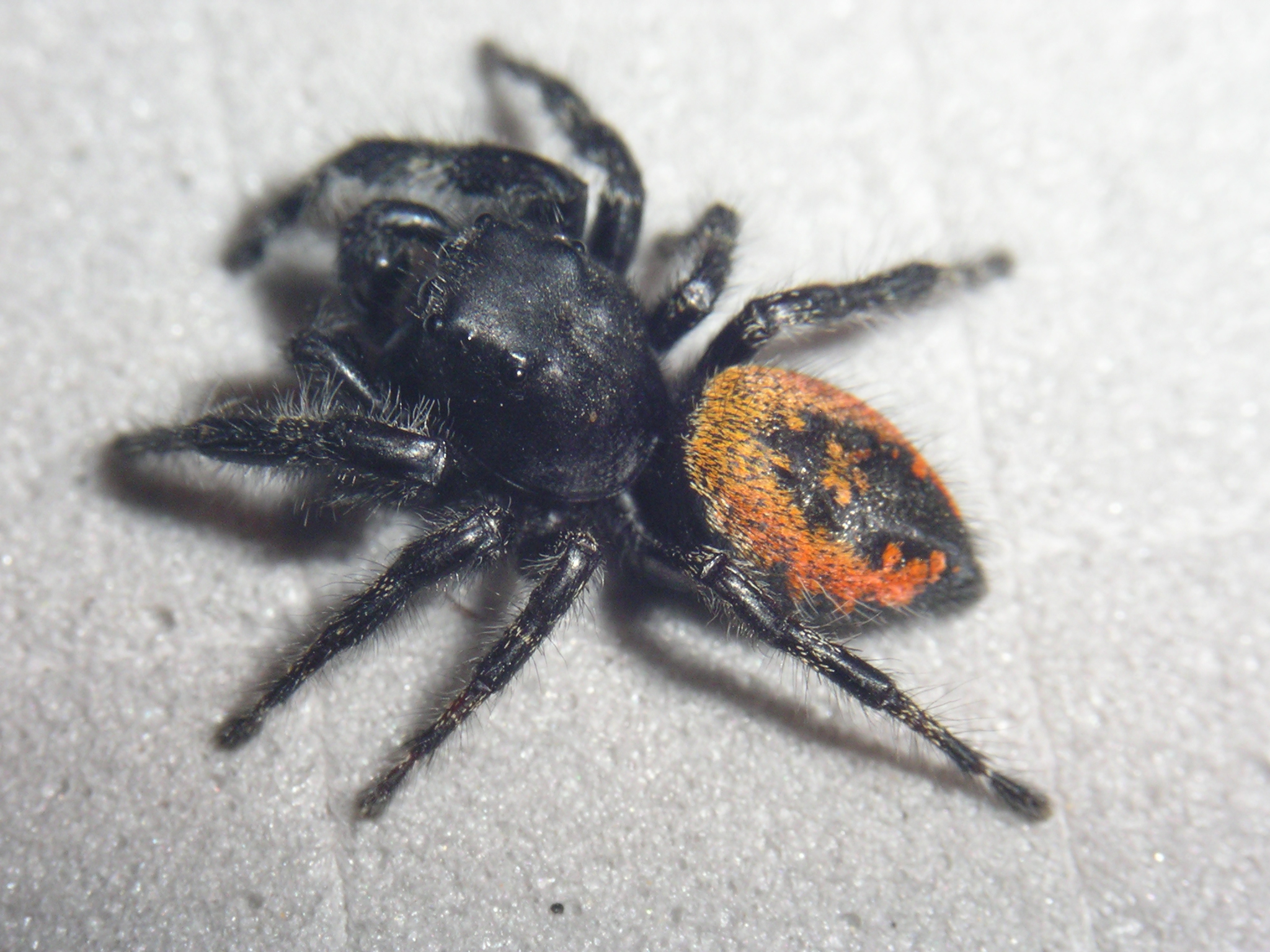
A boreal tufted jumping spider male

A small group of spiders have were reported from the fen bordering the southern margins of the lake. Arachnologist Rodney Crawford of the Burke Museum, based on surveying the Fen adjacent to the National Forest campground, identified a total of seven families, nine known species and one undescribed species. Only one family of mygalomorph spiders, Antrodiaetidae was found, the trapdoor spider Antrodiaetus cerberus inhabiting the fen margins. Within the remaining araneomorph taxa, six distinct families were all found. The Lycosids show up in the two thin legged wolf spiders P. fuscula and P. distincta. Similarly two jumping spiders are present, though in two genera, the yellowleg jumping spider in Pelegrina, and the larger boreal tufted jumping spider in Phidippus. One other family with two species in the area was identified, Thomisidae containing the Ozyptiia crab spider O. gertschi and the Xysticus ground crab spider X. chippewa. Two of other families are only known from a single species each, those being the Linyphiid dwarf spider Ceraticelus agathus and the Tetragnathid long-jawed orb-weaver Pachygnatha clercki. Within the sac spider family Liocranidae, a specimen placed in genus Agroeca was collected, but at the time it was considered to be potentially an undescribed species.

Only a few specific insect have been reported from Bonaparte Lake, with a corixid water boatman true bug species, Sigara (Arctosigara) decoratella and two fly species, the Tachinid fly Cylindromyia intermedia, plus the hover fly Microdon piperi. A 2020 study of the aphid genus Macrosiphoniella found the European species Macrosiphoniella (Macrosiphoniella) absinthii being hosted by the Artemesia sagebrushes in the area.

Bonaparte Lake has been identified as home to a Mud amnicola population along with Curlew Lake in Ferry County, Washington. The species is a common eastern North American snail, but only a scattering of lakes in Montana, Utah, and Washington host the snail.

=== Amphibians ===
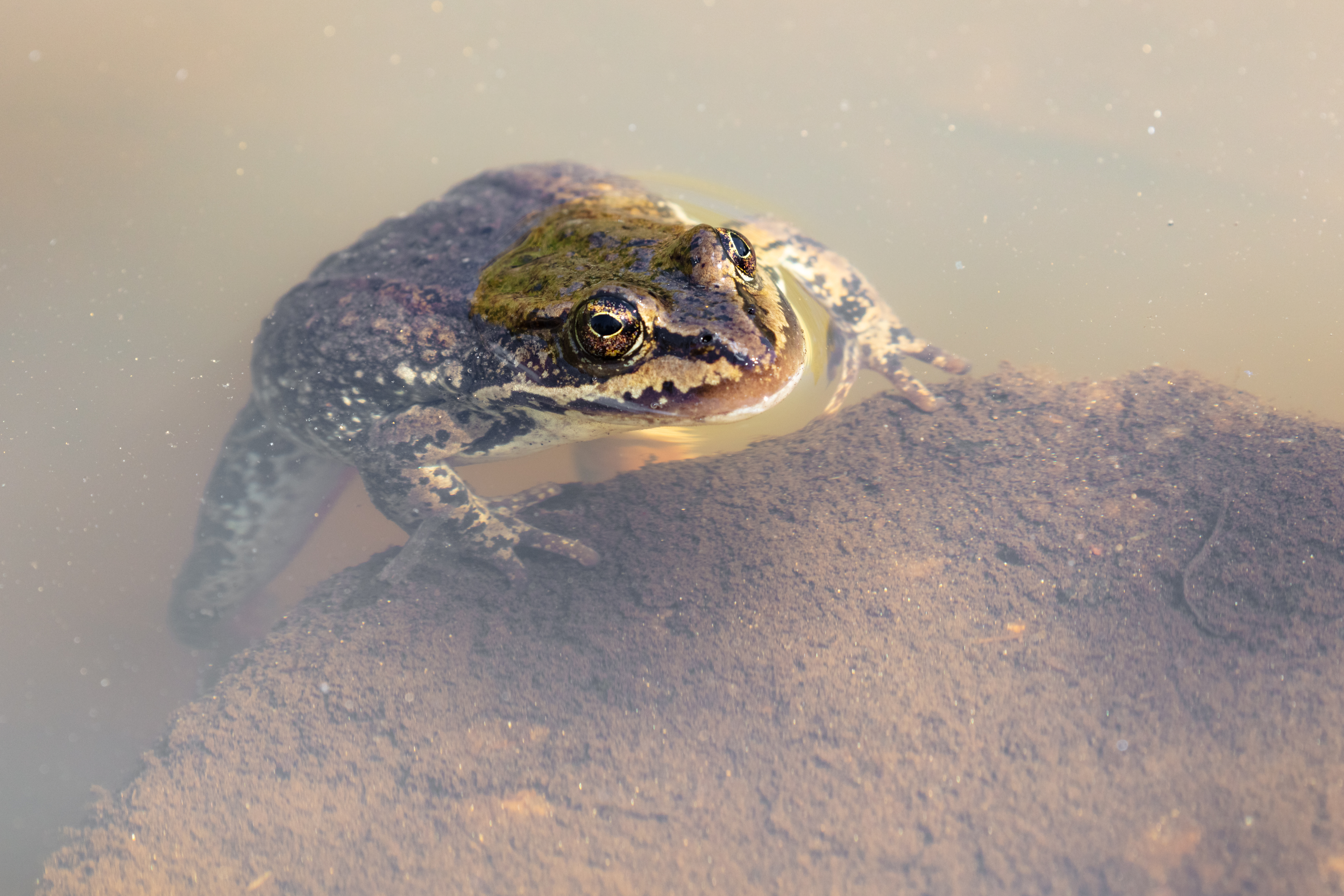
A Columbia spotted frog, Washington state species of concern

During investigation of the meadows area, populations of the Columbia spotted frog, a Washington state species of concern, was identified.

=== Fish ===
Stocking fish in Bonaparte Lake has been documented from at least the 1930s, with 1933 seeing a release of 100,000 eastern brown trout by the Pateros Hatchery. in the 2010s Rainbow trout fish planting, supplied by the Washington Department of Fish and Wildlife (WDFW) Omak Hatchery on Jasmine Creek near Omak, has been used to stock Bonaparte Lake. Due to the stock fish, the genetic origins of trout in the lake, its tributaries, and outflow is uncertain, with the possibility of some being native redband trout or hybrid offspring. Lake chub have been collected from the lake, with at least one specimen preserved in the ichthyology collections of the Burke Museum. Sportfish found in the lake include kokanee, Lake trout, eastern brook trout, Rainbow trout, Tiger trout, and smallmouth bass. The kokanee, brook, and brown trout are all stocked as fry at intermittent periods.

=== Birds ===
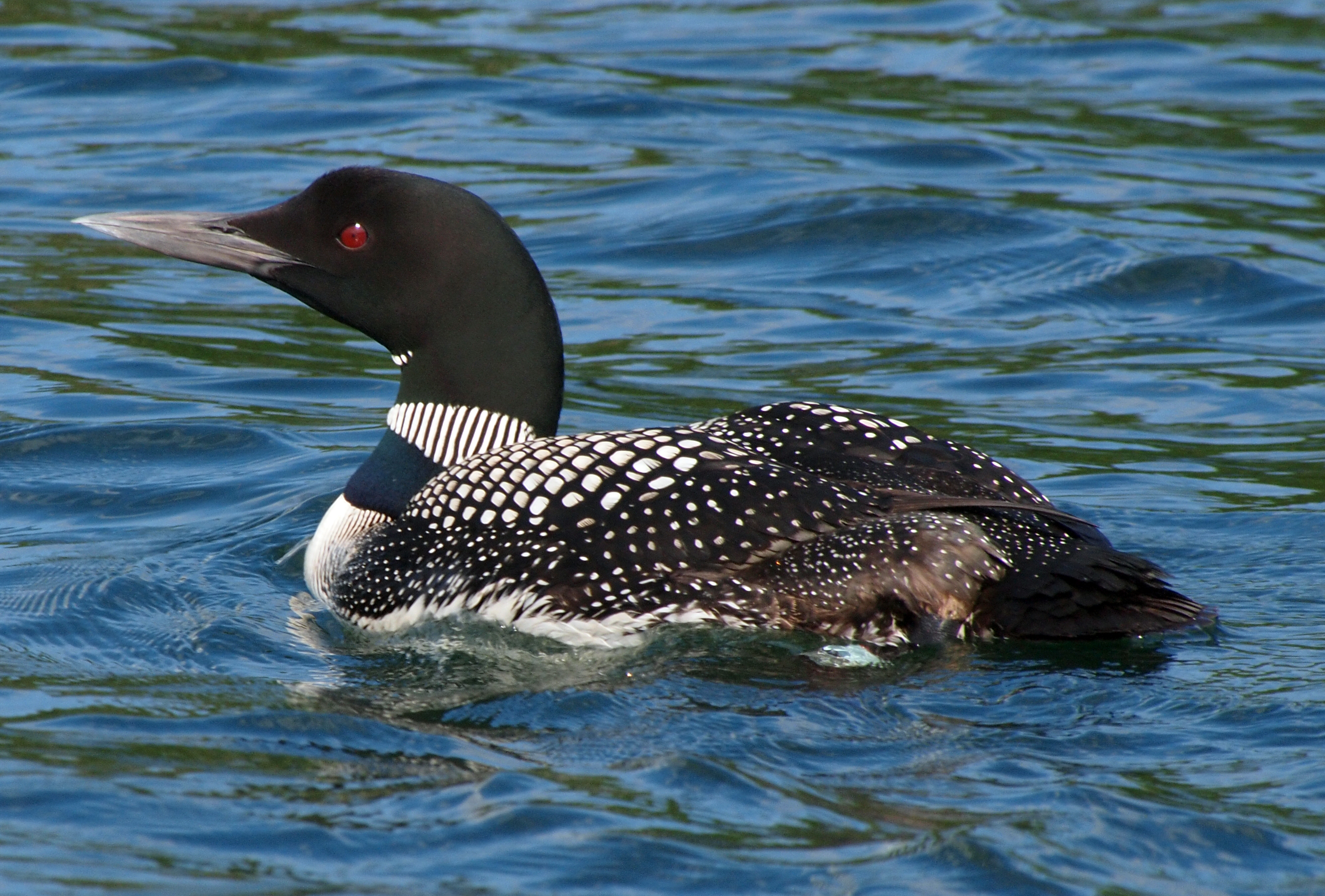
A Common loon in breeding plumage

The lake was designated lead sinker free in 2011 to protect resident nesting loons from lead poisoning caused by ingestion of weights. Common loons summer on the lake, nesting and mating, and while many loon populations overwinter in oceanic sites, at least some of the Bonaparte individuals are documented to overwinter on Lake Pateros. The lake and meadows are an important location for migratory bird species, including Barrow's goldeneye, a sea duck native to Western North America. A sighting of a single Wilson's Phalarope (Steganopus tricolor) was reported in 1958.

=== Mammals ===
Large mammals that are known to use the lake and meadows include herbivores such as mule deer, white-tail deer, elk and moose. The carnivores of the area include mustelids like American badgers, plus the felines bobcat, Canadian lynx, and mountain lion. The largest predator is the black bear while canines include the coyote and grey wolves. The area has been studied as a wolf pack free area, while areas to the east in Ferry County have several established packs. The wolves that have been documented since the 2008 self-reintroduction of grey wolves into Washington are all transient, not actively maintaining a range that includes the lake or Mount Bonaparte.

=== Wildfires ===
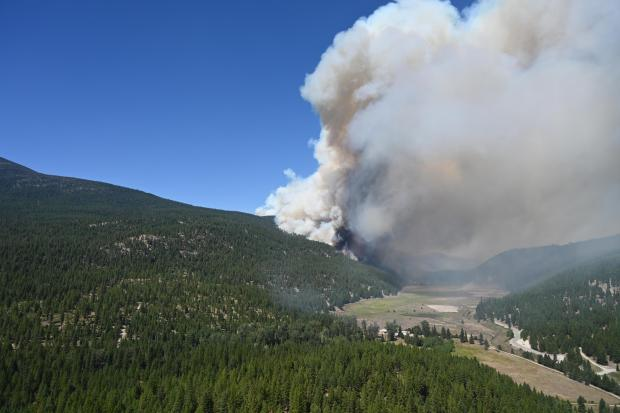
Smoke plume, Walker/Spur fire in 2021

Bonaparte Lake has a history of fire ecology with over 19 wildland fires of various sizes documented since 1940. The greater Bonaparte area was threatened by a wildfire during the summer of 1973 started on a hill near the Boy Scouts of America camp on Lake Bonaparte. The Bonaparte Lake Fire was first spotted on July 30 and grew to about 200 acres (81 ha) in size by July 31 with state and federal fire fighting crews working to manage it. The 60 persons in ground crews were supported by three air tankers. A wildlands fire crew from the Wind River Ranger District of southern Washington around the Columbia Gorge drove up and assisted in the containment process during the first week of August 1973. The fire caused evacuations in the Bonaparte region, including summer camps to the north of the Mountain at lost Lake, but did not impact the community of Havillah to the west. By August 2 upwards of 600 personnel were assigned to the fire, which was between 1,000–1,200 acres (400–490 ha) in size. It was estimated the fire was fully surrounded by the evening of August 1, and crews were transitioning to mop up work within the fire perimeter. Efforts at replanting the burned area were undertaken a few years later by the forest service, with a mix of 75,000 Douglas fir and ponderosa pine seedlings being planted over the early spring of 1976.

The Walker Fire, including the smaller Spur Fire in 2021 burned over portions of Mount Bonaparte and areas of the lake shore, encompassing around 23,765 acres (9,617 ha). Starting in early August, the Spur fire had grown to a 50 acres (20 ha) fire and Okanogan County Emergency Management issued a level 3 evacuation order for the Mount Bonaparte area, just south of Bonaparte Lake north to Lost Lake.

Within the 2024 Okanogan County, Washington Community Wildfire Protection Plan, Mount Bonaparte and the immediate surrounding region such as Bonaparte Lake are not included in any of the defined regional fire districts. Rather the area, being mostly state and private forestland, is overseen by the Washington State Department of Natural Resources, which maintains mutual aid agreements with the surrounding fire districts of the Okanogan Highlands, districts number 12 though 14 and 16.

== History ==
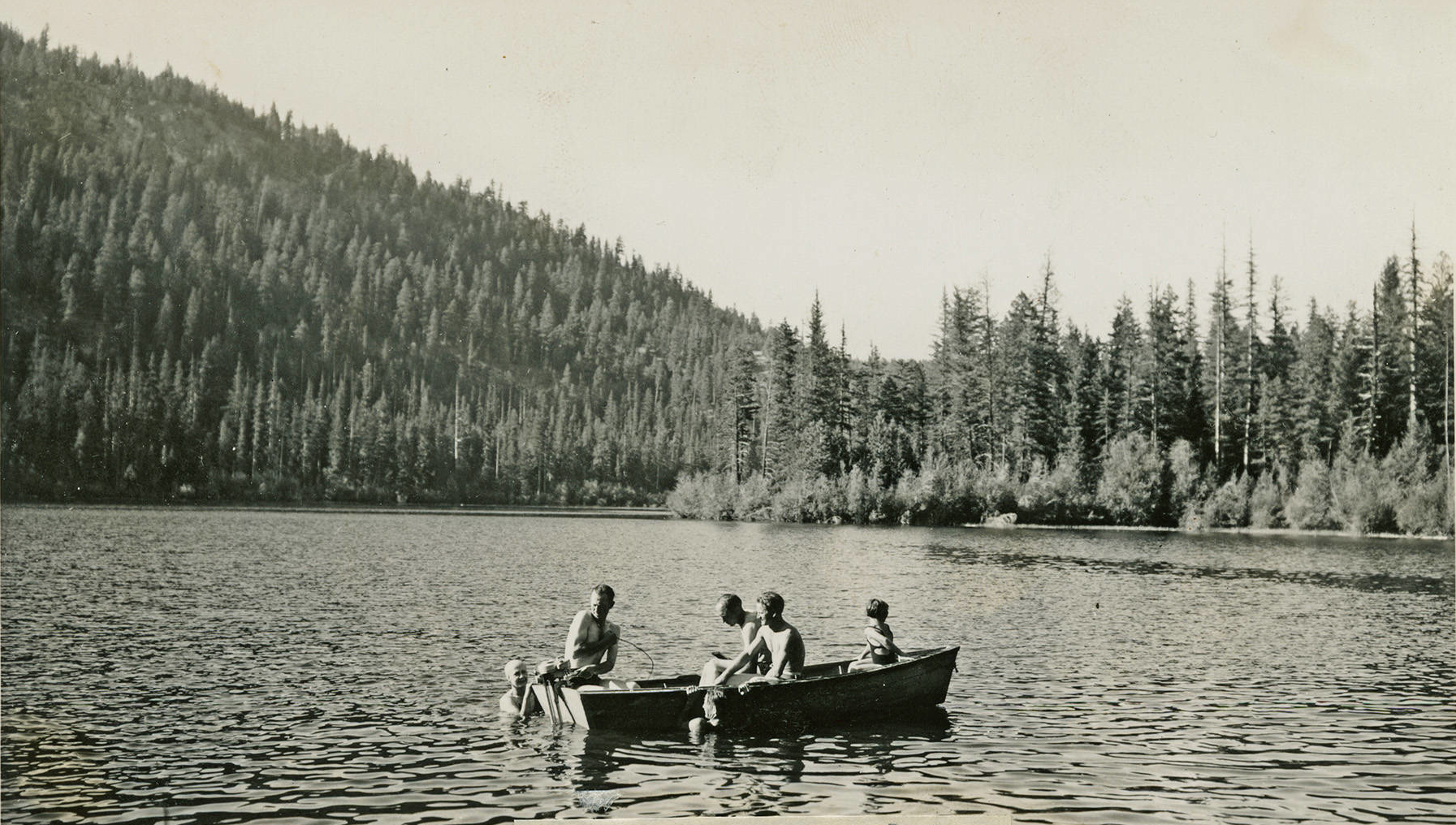
Boating and swimming in the 1930s

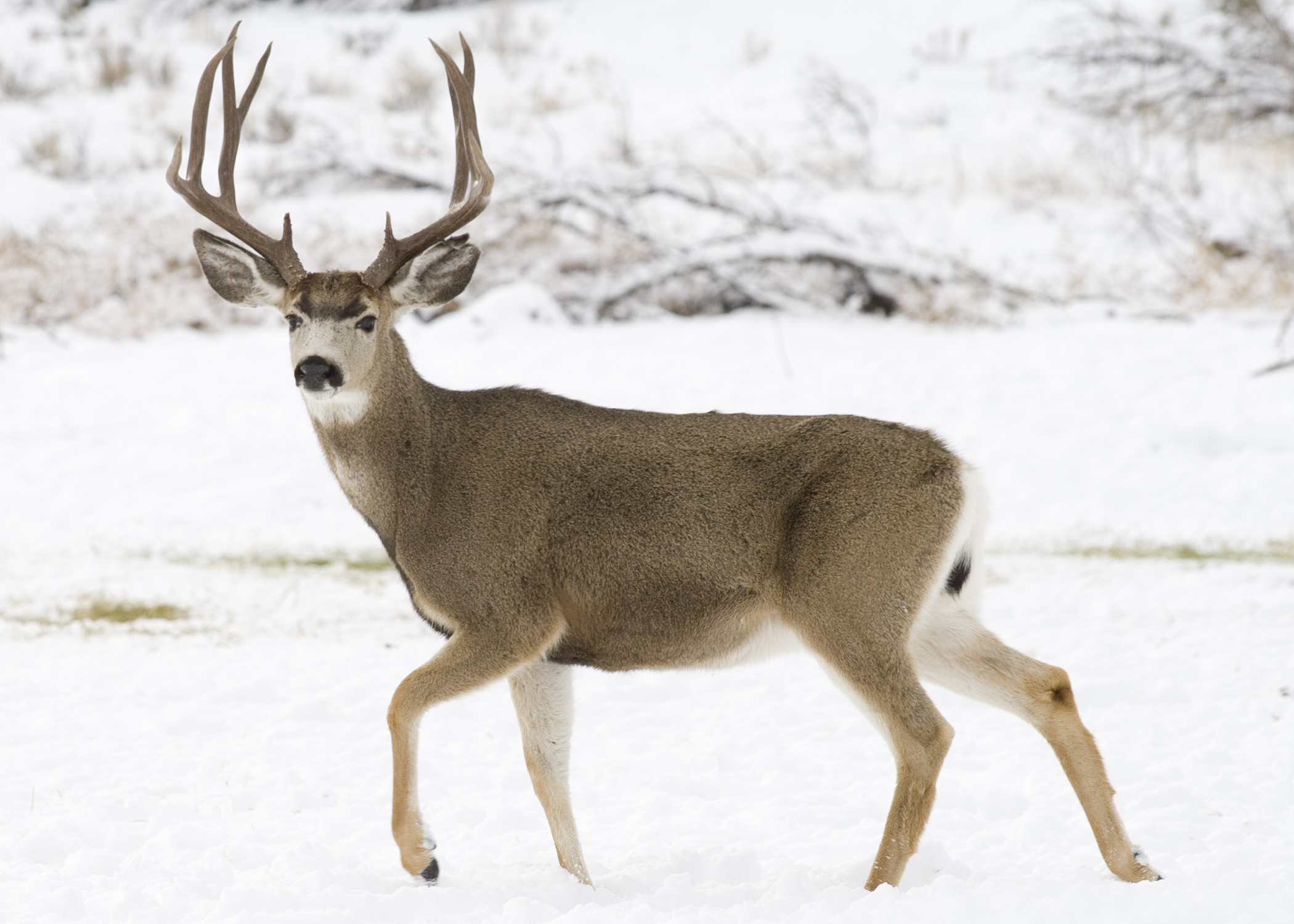
Mule deer buck

The region is ancestral land of the Syilx peoples which lived in the areas stretching from the Methow Valley east to the Okanogan Highlands. Following the Yakima war on the Columbia Plateau to the south, President Ulysses S. Grant issued an Executive order on April 9, 1872, in which the original Colville Indian Reservation was decreed, though the placement of the original boundaries was modified by another decree on July 2, 1872. The reservation as published in July placed the boundaries as north and west of the Columbia River, east of the Okanogan River, and south of what became British Columbia. Based on an initial agreement with the Confederated Tribes of the Colville Reservation in 1891, the northern portion of the reservation, approximately 160,000 acres (65,000 ha) was appropriated by the federal government via 1892 federal legislation. The area opened included all of the greater Bonaparte region.

=== Agriculture ===
Assessment of the Bonaparte Creek watershed over 1917 and 1918 determined the area did not retain winter precipitation for long periods due to soil and ground type. To supplement the water needed for agricultural development of the Bonaparte Valley, the Washington state hydraulic engineer suggested damming on Lake Bonaparte to make an increased reservoir. By 1948 a small retention dam had been built in the lake, creating a reservoir with a capacity of 1,080 acre⋅ft (1,330,000 m^{3}) and the water drawn off being classified for domestic usage. A water use permit to The Bonaparte Water Users Association has been active since 1915, allotting up to 1,080 acre⋅ft (1,330,000 m^{3}) of water to be drawn off from the lake annually. The small dam is present at the southern end of the lake and separating the greater lake basin from the Bonaparte Meadows on the downstream side. The dam is privately owned with a total length of 180 ft (55 m) and a height 9 ft (2.7 m). The reported normal water storage is 535 acre⋅ft (660,000 m^{3}) and a maximum volume of 995 acre⋅ft (1,227,000 m^{3}). 97,877 acres (39,609 ha).

=== Game Reserve ===
For a period of time from 1929 to the summer of 1939, an area centered on Mount Bonaparte was placed into the Bonaparte Reserve by the state. This designation as a Washington State game reserve prevented hunting on a 58,240 acres (23,570 ha) region, though grazing by ranchers was still permitted. An updated boundary for the preserve was issued by the Washington State Game Protector in 1937, with Mount Bonaparte fully encompassed in the preserve, and including Bonaparte lake on the eastern margin. The western boundary ran from Anglin north into the Siwash Creek valley and then along Siwash Creek northeast to Havillah. The northern boundary ran along the forest service road east to Lost Lake, there turning south along Bonaparte Lake road as the eastern border. The southern bound was marked as what is now Washington State Route 20. The game reserve was officially decommissioned for the 1939 deer hunting season. Its reported that the opening of the deer season was attended by over 4,000 hunters across the former preserve lands, with the The Spokesman-Review deeming it possibly the largest influx of hunters seen in the region. One group of hunters leaving the area early equated it to being in World War I and the no mans land between the Maginot Line and Siegfried Line. At least one death was attributed to hunting accident in the area.

State fishing regulations were changed in advance of the 2007 fishing season for a group of lakes in northeastern Washington including Bonaparte. Given the breeding presence of common loons on the lake, small size lead fishing weights were banned from use in an effort to reduce instances of lead poisoning in the birds. The lake has a 10 mph (16 km/h) speed limit for the motorized boating.

== Recreation ==
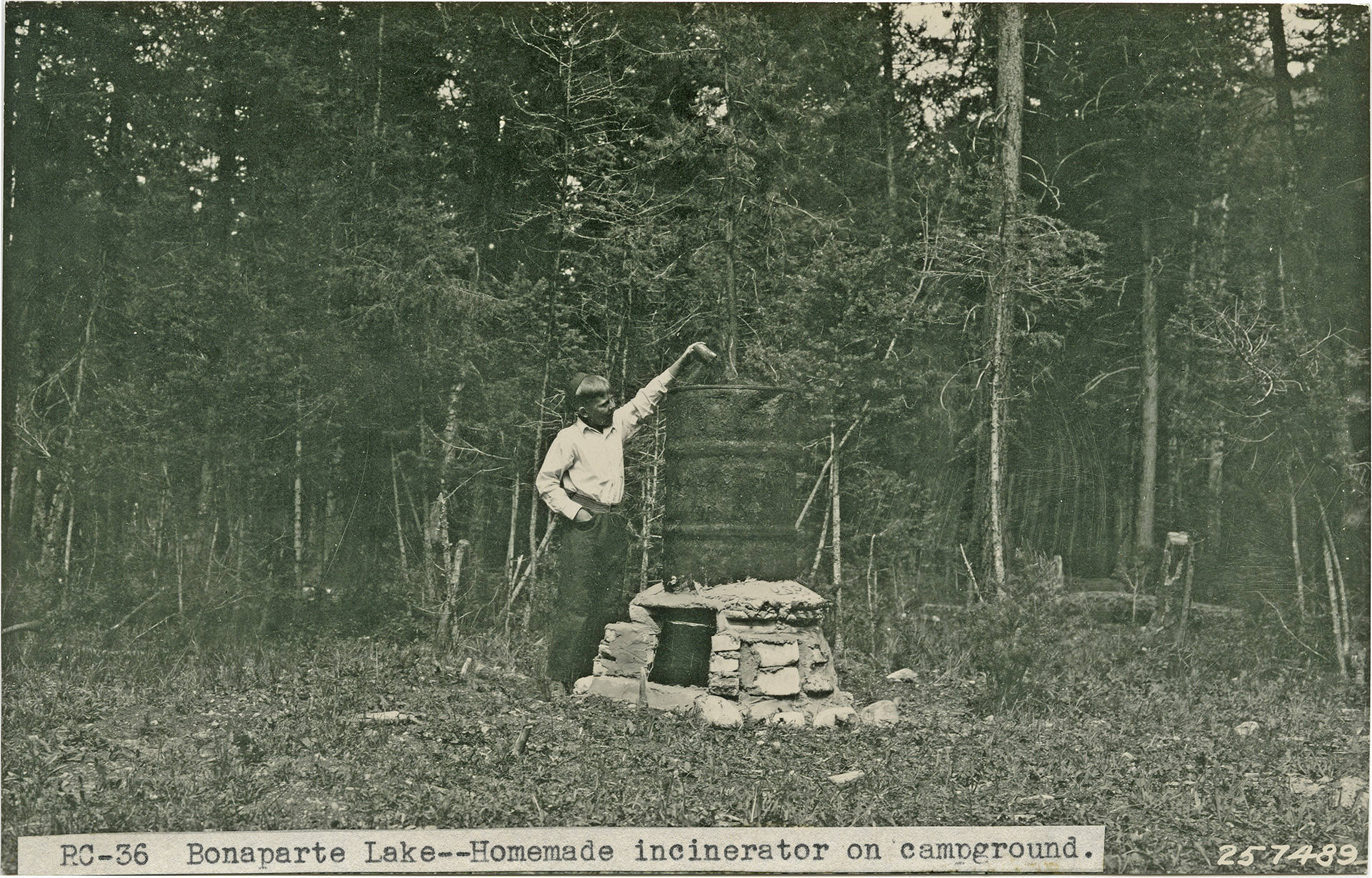
Original campground trash incinerator, c. 1930s

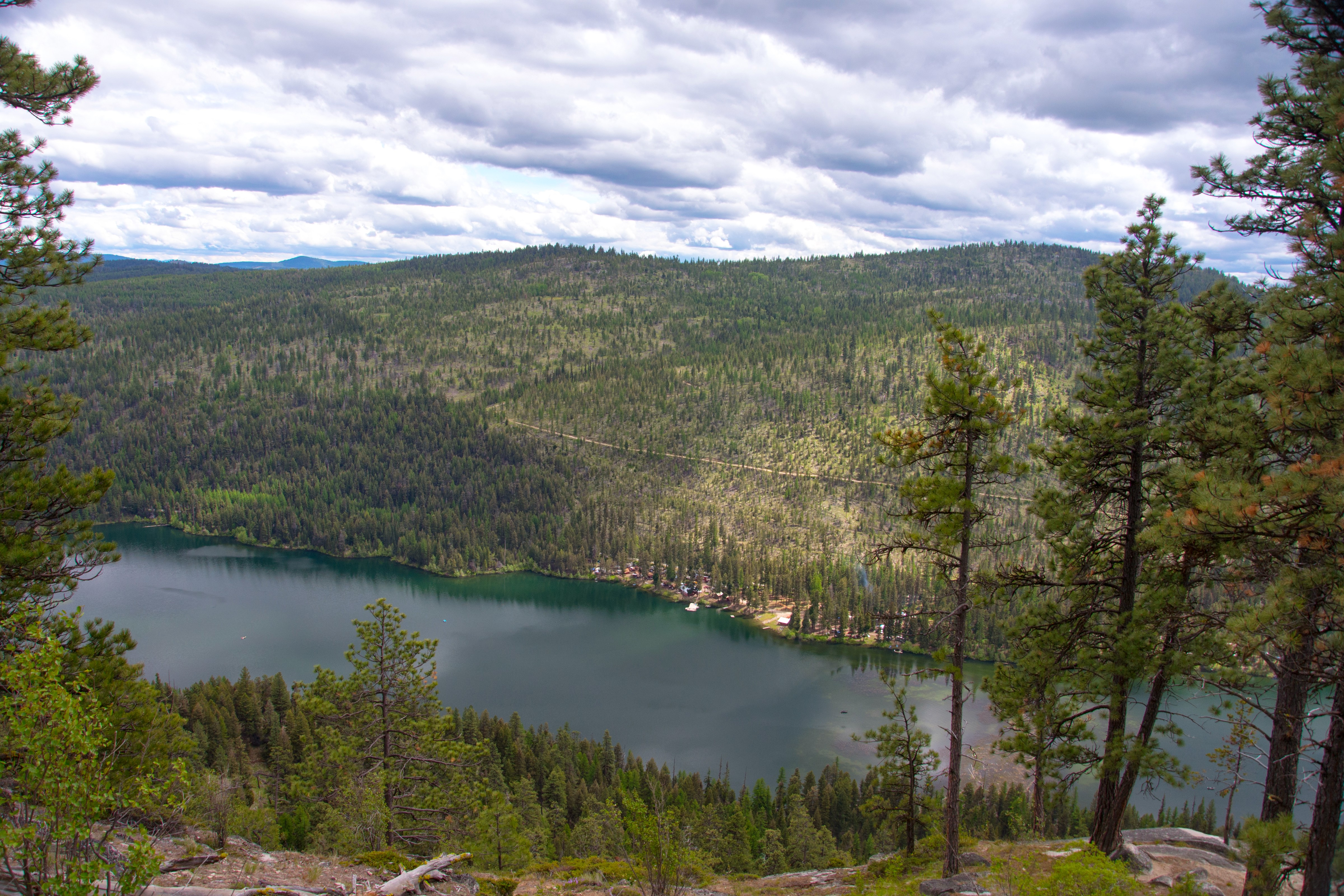
Bonaparte Resort viewed from the Pacific Northwest Trail.

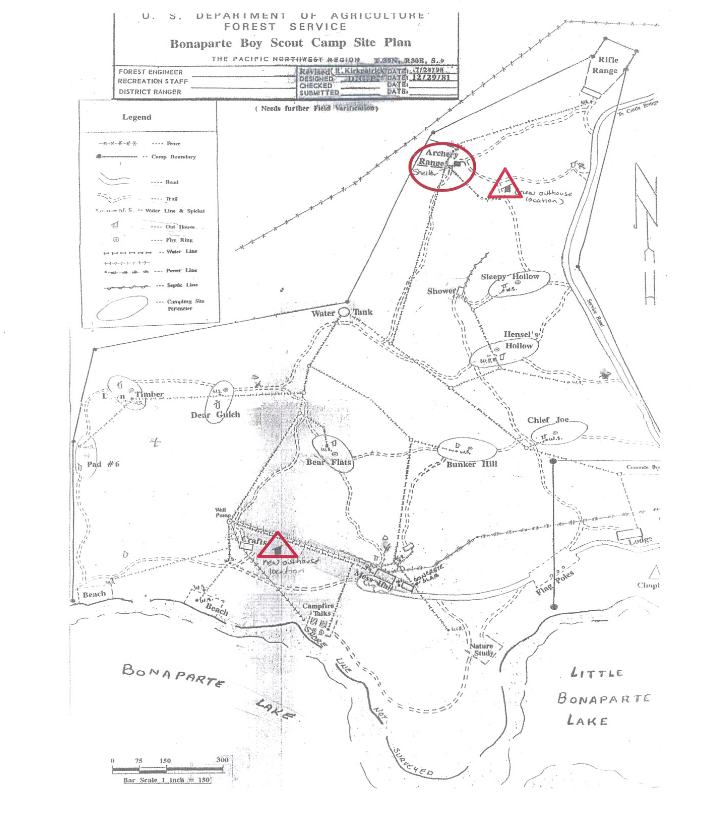
Line map of Camp Bonaparte c. 2016, proposed upgrade sites outlined in red

Recreation around the lake was formalized in the 1930s with the Forest Service announcing a comprehensive recreation plan for the area surrounding Bonaparte Lake. The plan called for the construction of a national forest campground, a public resort area, area for a scouting-type camp, a guard station and private summer homes.

=== Colville National Forest campground ===
Funding was being sourced for the construction of the public campground, with plans calling for wells, toilets, garbage incinerators, and fireplaces. Future plans also allowed for a camp area request by organizations such as the Boy Scouts. It was noted that Lost Lake north of Bonaparte was the more popular at that time, but offered less camping and fishing options.

The national forest campground is located on the south end of the lake, 1 mi (1.6 km) southwest of Bonaparte Lake Resort, and near the trailheads leading up Mount Bonaparte and the Mount Bonaparte Lookout. In 2015 the national forest campground had 25 camping sites and three camping or RV sites. There was an additional bike or hike in site. The grounds have vault toilets, drinkable running water, and garbage service. Only some of the sites and portions of the grounds are handicapped accessible. As of 2026, the campground doesn't have cell service or electricity and the RV sites allow for vehicle parking but do not have hook-up options. The campsites are reservable in advance from May though October, and is closed November through April.

=== Bonaparte Resort ===
The Bonaparte Lake Resort was first opened in the late 1930s with an ownership change in 1975. The resort encompasses nine cabins, eleven trailer sites, and rental boats. Following the 1975 change, the new owners planned to winterize the cabins for year-round use, relocate both the icehouse and the store plus add a seasonal restaurant that would be open during the hunting seasons. The resort formerly hosted and annual ice harvest. The resort on the southeast shore of the lake and hosts ice fishing and poker tournaments. The grounds had 10 cabins, 30 RV hookup spots, and 15 tent sites as of 2015. While the resort was open year-round, facilities were noted to be limited during the winter months. The grounds include public restrooms with showers, laundry, recreation hall, restaurant and store. There are facilities for boat launching and rentals.

Ice fishing is a winter recreational draw to Bonaparte Lake focused on annual derbies in January hosted by the resort. The timing of the fishing is determined on solid lake ice of at least 4 in (100 mm) in thickness.

=== Camp Bonaparte ===
While originally foreseen as a part of the Bonaparte Lake recreation uses, a scouting camp did not happen in the 1930s like the campground and resort did. Camp Bonaparte was opened in 1958 as wilderness facility, with a series of separate sites large enough for a troop each. Water was piped into each site while food is housed and provided by a commissary with refrigerator. Early camp development was performed by troops of Scouts during the 1958-1959 summers. Along with waterlines, installation included a refrigerator which was formerly used on a Lake Chelan barge travelling between Chelan and the Holden mine landing. A full commissary/kitchen building was completed in 1963 and in 1969 funding was sought for adding new camp sites, expanding sanitation facilities, and building an equipment building and a headquarters building.

Four year visitation averages based on forest service data from the early 1990s showed Camp Bonaparte experienced visitations by 900 people on average, with a cumulative 5,300 visit days. A visit day was defined as 12 visit hours in total but not needing to be a single duration visit. During a 2013 thunderstorm a number of trees were felled and several buildings damaged. While the crafts building was saved, the commissary was not salvageable and a replacement was built in its spot in 2014. Application was made in 2016 for building a new pole barn and digging two new vault toilets. The request was reviewed and approved in August of that year and an estimated start time was given for September.

Ownership of the National Forest lease and nearby purchased land parcels has changed several times since its origins in the 1950s. The North-Central Council of the Boy Scouts first received a national forest special lease in the late 1950s. Then in the early 1990s the council merged with the Fort Simcoe Area Council based in Yakima to form the much larger Grand Columbia Council. A 22 acres (8.9 ha) parcel of the camp land was put up for sale in 2011 by the Grand Columbia Council in an attempt to cover debts incurred in 2005. The asking price for property was given as $105,000. The Grand Columbia Council existed for 20 years before it was officially absorbed into the Chief Seattle Council. The former council was reorganized into three service districts, the Simcoe Mountains, Basalt Coulee, and Highlands, with Camp Bonaparte being maintained under the larger councils authority.
