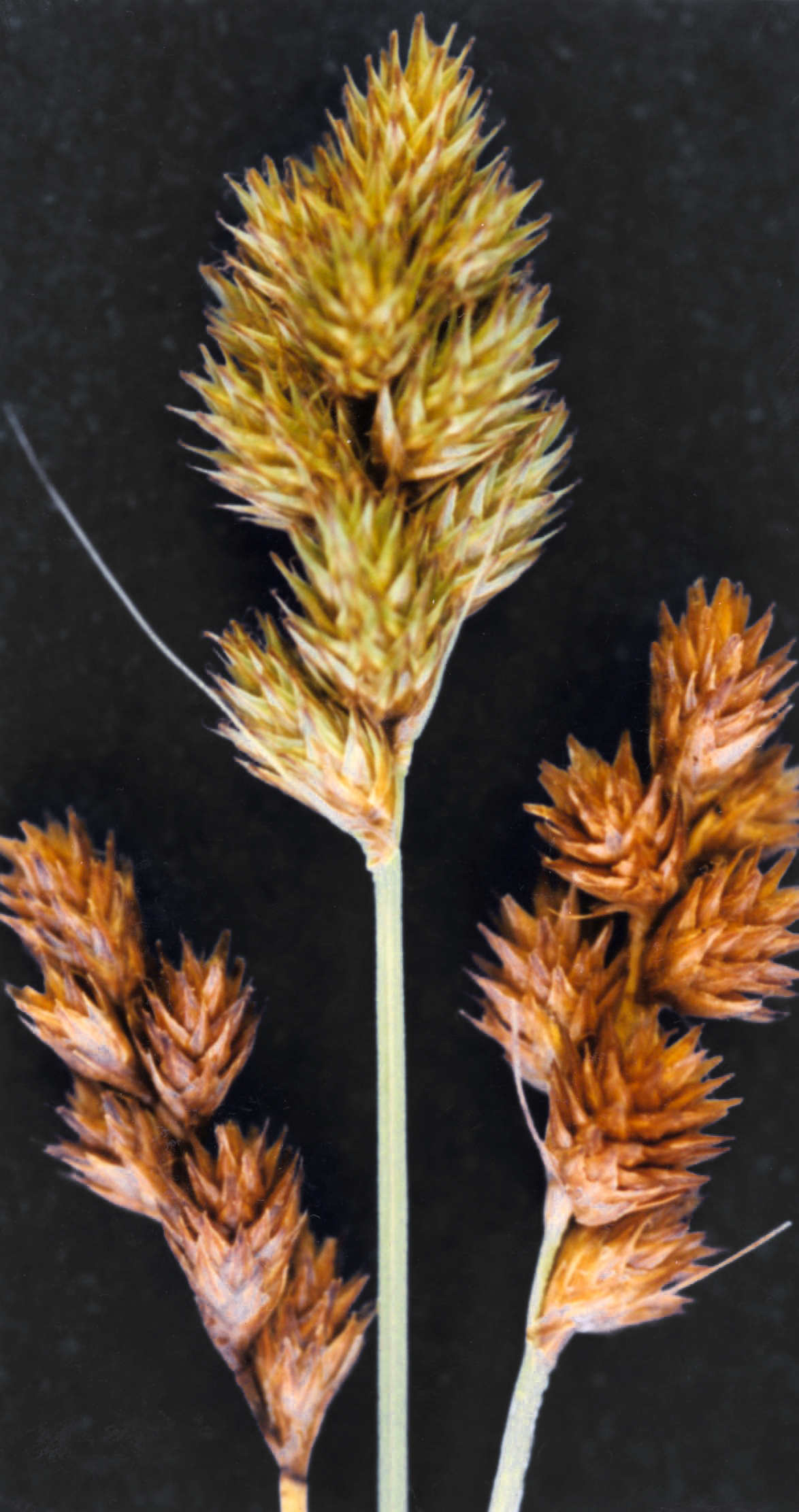

Conservation status
- Least Concern (IUCN 3.1)

Scientific classification
- Kingdom: Plantae
- Clade: Tracheophytes
- Clade: Angiosperms
- Clade: Monocots
- Clade: Commelinids
- Order: Poales
- Family: Cyperaceae
- Genus: Carex
- Subgenus: Carex subg. Vignea
- Section: Carex sect. Ovales
- Species: C. bebbii

Binomial name
- Carex bebbii (L.H.Bailey) Olney ex Fernald

Synonyms
- Carex tribuloides var. bebbii L.H.Bailey

= Carex bebbii =

Species of sedge

Carex bebbii, Bebb's sedge, is a species of sedge native to the northern United States and Canada. Carex bebbii grows in a variety of wetland habitats such as lakeshores, streambanks, ditches, meadows, swamps, and seeps. It forms dense tufts with culms up to 90 centimeters (35 in) tall.
