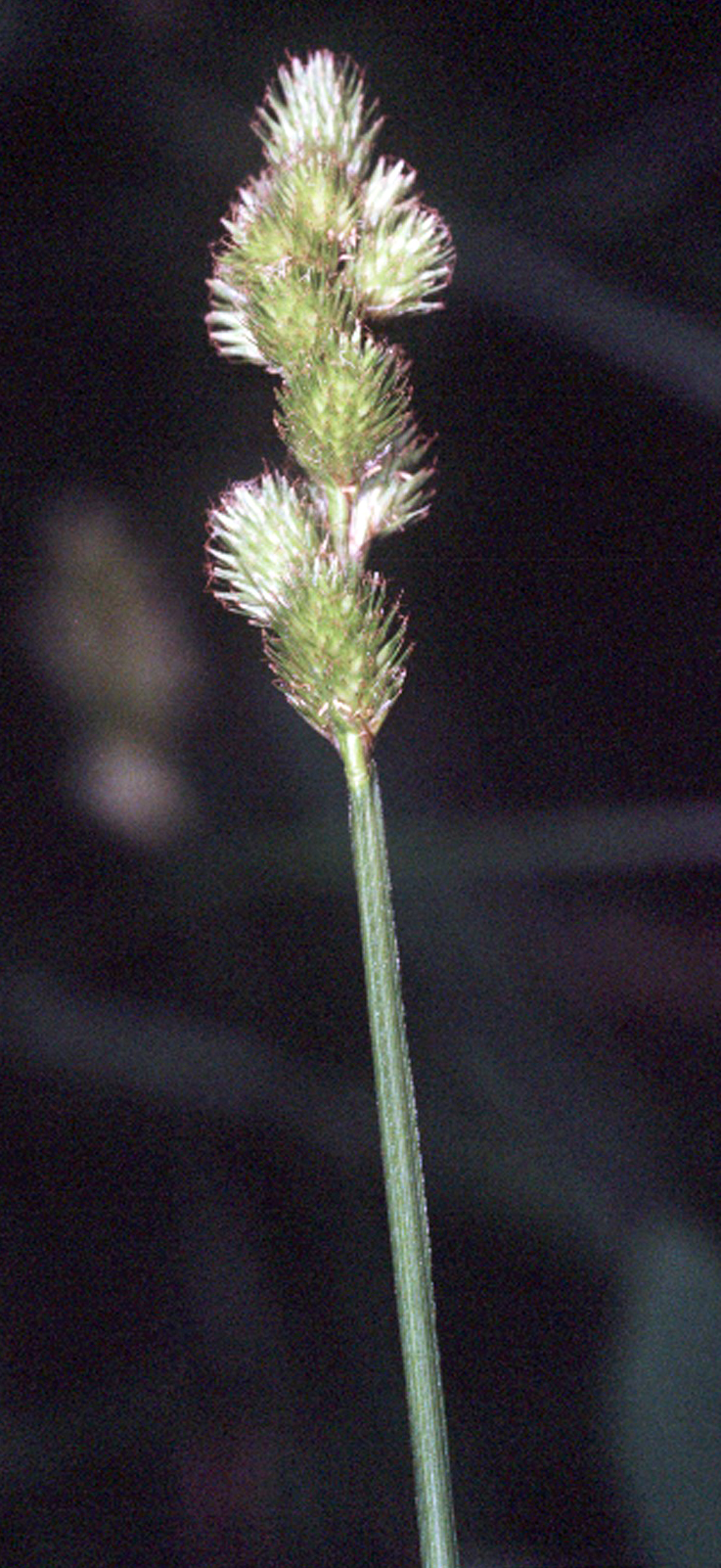
- Flowers

Scientific classification
- Kingdom: Plantae
- Clade: Tracheophytes
- Clade: Angiosperms
- Clade: Monocots
- Clade: Commelinids
- Order: Poales
- Family: Cyperaceae
- Genus: Carex
- Species: C. tribuloides

Binomial name
- Carex tribuloides Wahlenb.

Synonyms
- List: Carex cristata var. reducta (L.H.Bailey) Kük.; Carex lagopodioides Willd.; Carex lagopodioides var. moniliformis Olney ex L.H.Bailey; Carex sangamonensis (Clokey) Mohlenbr.; Carex scoparia var. lagopodioides (Willd.) Torr.; Carex tribuloides f. aggregata Peck; Carex tribuloides var. reducta L.H.Bailey; Carex tribuloides var. turbata L.H.Bailey; Vignea lagopodioides (Willd.) Rchb.

= Carex tribuloides =

Species of flowering plant

Carex tribuloides, the blunt broom sedge, is a species of flowering plant in the genus Carex, native to the eastern United States, eastern Canada, and Veracruz in Mexico, and introduced in Sweden. It is an important food for soras (Porzana carolina) during their spring migration.

== Subtaxa ==
The following varieties are currently accepted:

- Carex tribuloides var. sangamonensis Clokey
- Carex tribuloides var. tribuloides
