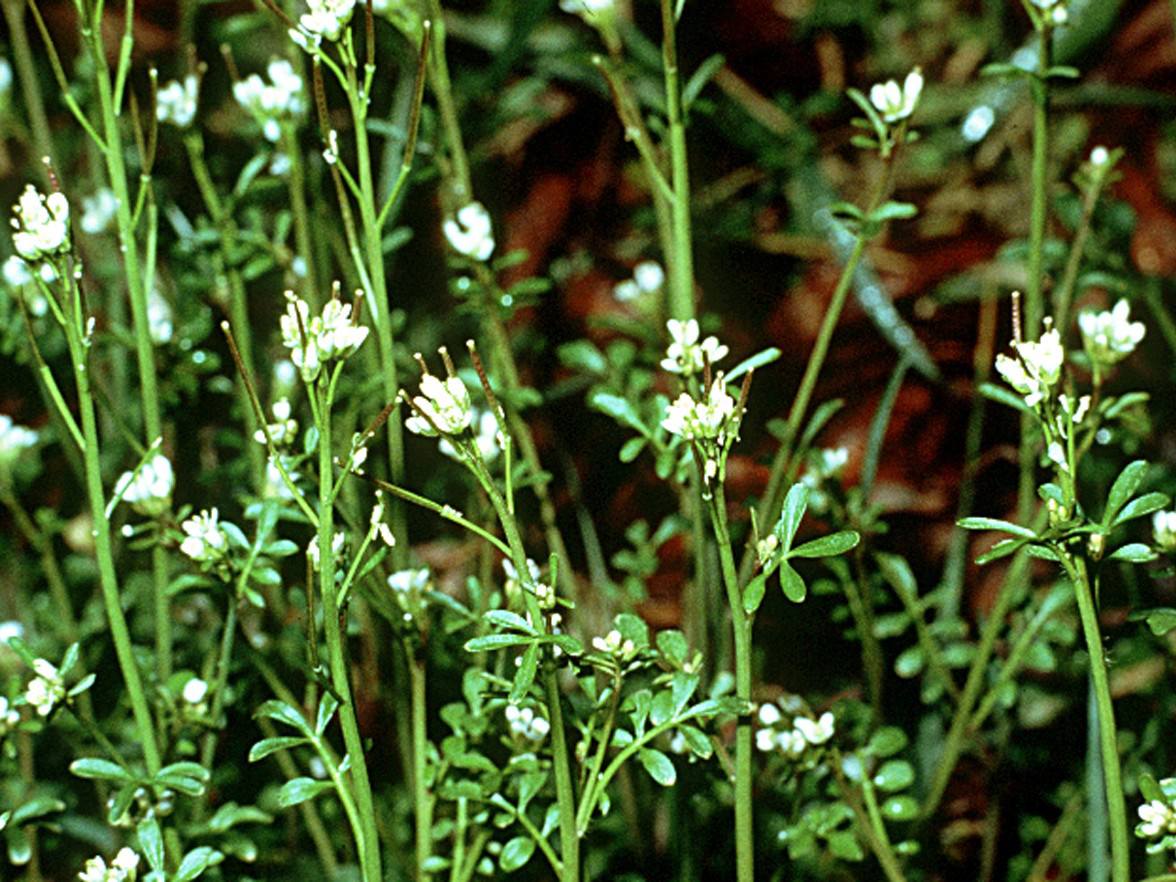

Conservation status
- Secure (NatureServe)

Scientific classification
- Kingdom: Plantae
- Clade: Tracheophytes
- Clade: Angiosperms
- Clade: Eudicots
- Clade: Rosids
- Order: Brassicales
- Family: Brassicaceae
- Genus: Cardamine
- Species: C. pensylvanica

Binomial name
- Cardamine pensylvanica Muhl. ex Willd.

= Cardamine pensylvanica =

Species of plant

Cardamine pensylvanica is a species of Cardamine known by the common name Pennsylvania bittercress. It is native to most of Canada and the United States from coast to coast.

== Ecology and description ==
It is generally found in moist to wet areas, such as the mud on riverbanks. It is a biennial herb producing one or more erect or leaning, branching stems which are purple to green in color and grow 10–70 cm (4–28 in) tall. The leaves are hairless and divided into several rounded to oval lobes, each of which has one or two lobes, with the exception of the large terminal leaflet at the tip, which generally has three. Most of the leaves are located along the stem and there is no basal rosette. The inflorescence comprises many flowers, each with four white petals a few millimeters long, blossoming from April to October. The fruit is a slender silique 2–3 cm (0.8–1.2 in) long.

== Consumption ==
All parts of Cardamine pensylvanica are considered edible. Young leaves can be eaten raw, while older leaves should be cooked; they have a peppery flavor. Seed pods are good raw, stir fried, or pickled, before seeds mature and harden. Roots can be mixed with vinegar to make a good horseradish substitute.
