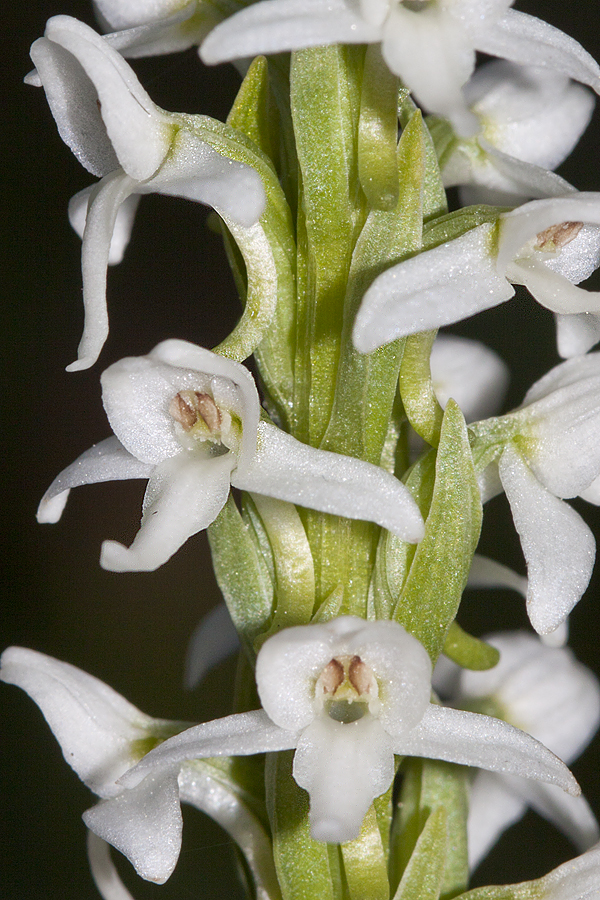
- At Glacier National Park in Montana

Conservation status
- Secure (NatureServe)
- CITES Appendix II (CITES)

Scientific classification
- Kingdom: Plantae
- Clade: Tracheophytes
- Clade: Angiosperms
- Clade: Monocots
- Order: Asparagales
- Family: Orchidaceae
- Subfamily: Orchidoideae
- Genus: Platanthera
- Species: P. dilatata

Binomial name
- Platanthera dilatata (Pursh) Lindl. ex L.C.Beck

Synonyms
- Habenaria dilatata (Pursh) Hook.; Limnorchis dilatata ( Pursh) Rydb.; Orchis dilatata Pursh; Piperia dilatata (Pursh) Szlach. & Rutk.

= Platanthera dilatata =

Species of orchid

Platanthera dilatata, known as tall white bog orchid, bog candle, or boreal bog orchid is a species of orchid, a flowering plant in the family Orchidaceae, native to North America. It was first formally described in 1813 by Frederick Traugott Pursh as Orchis dilatata.

It is sometimes called fragrant white bog orchid or scentbottle, for the smell of its flowers, described as intensely spicy or clove-like.

In the Midwest and northeastern United States and Canada, it grows in cold, calcareous fens, cedar and tamarack swamps, meadows, and marshes, typically in sunny spots.

== Description ==
Bog candle is an erect, perennial flower growing up to 11–130 cm (4.3–51.2 in) tall. The showy, white flowers are clustered on long spikes. The petals are ovate to linear-lance shaped with smooth edges, not divided or fringed like some other Platanthera species. The lateral sepals spread or reflex.

The leaves are linear to lanceolate or oblanceolate, and reduce in size toward the top of the plant. The leave size ranges from 3–32 cm (1.2–12.6 in) long to 0.3–7 cm (0.12–2.76 in) across.

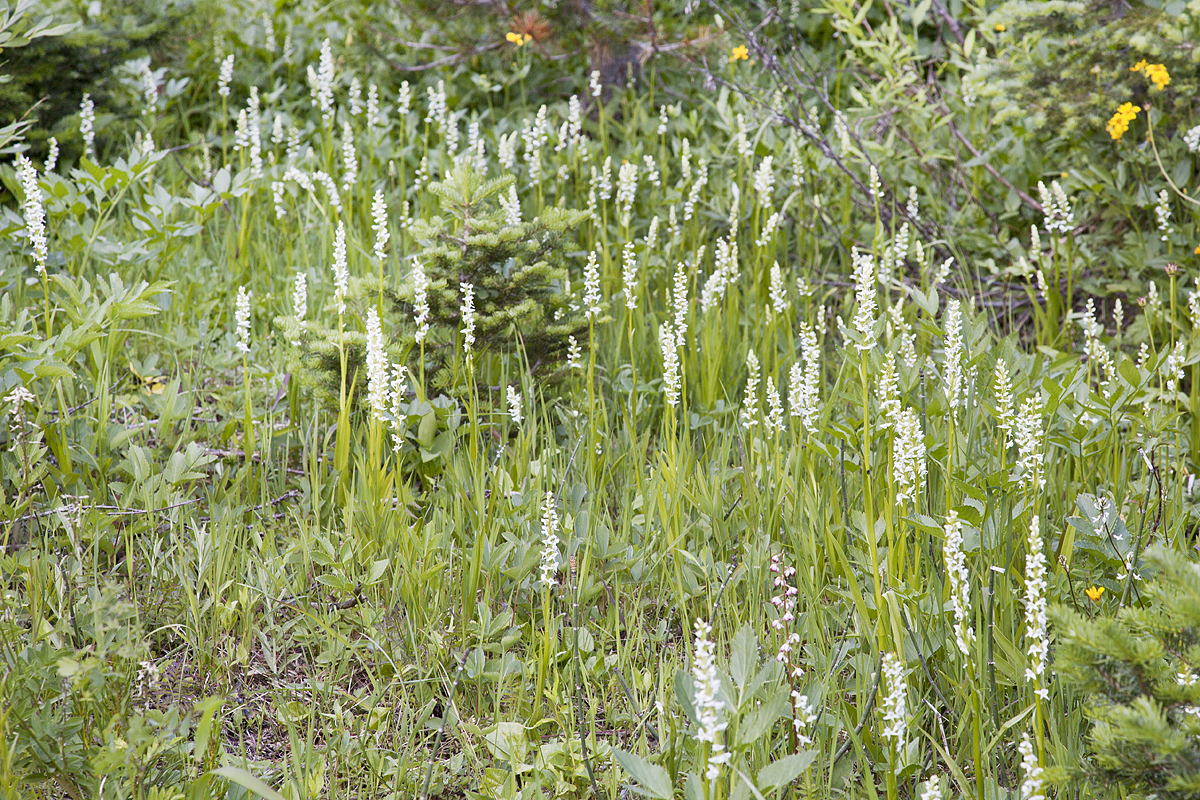
Scentbottles at Glacier National Park, Montana

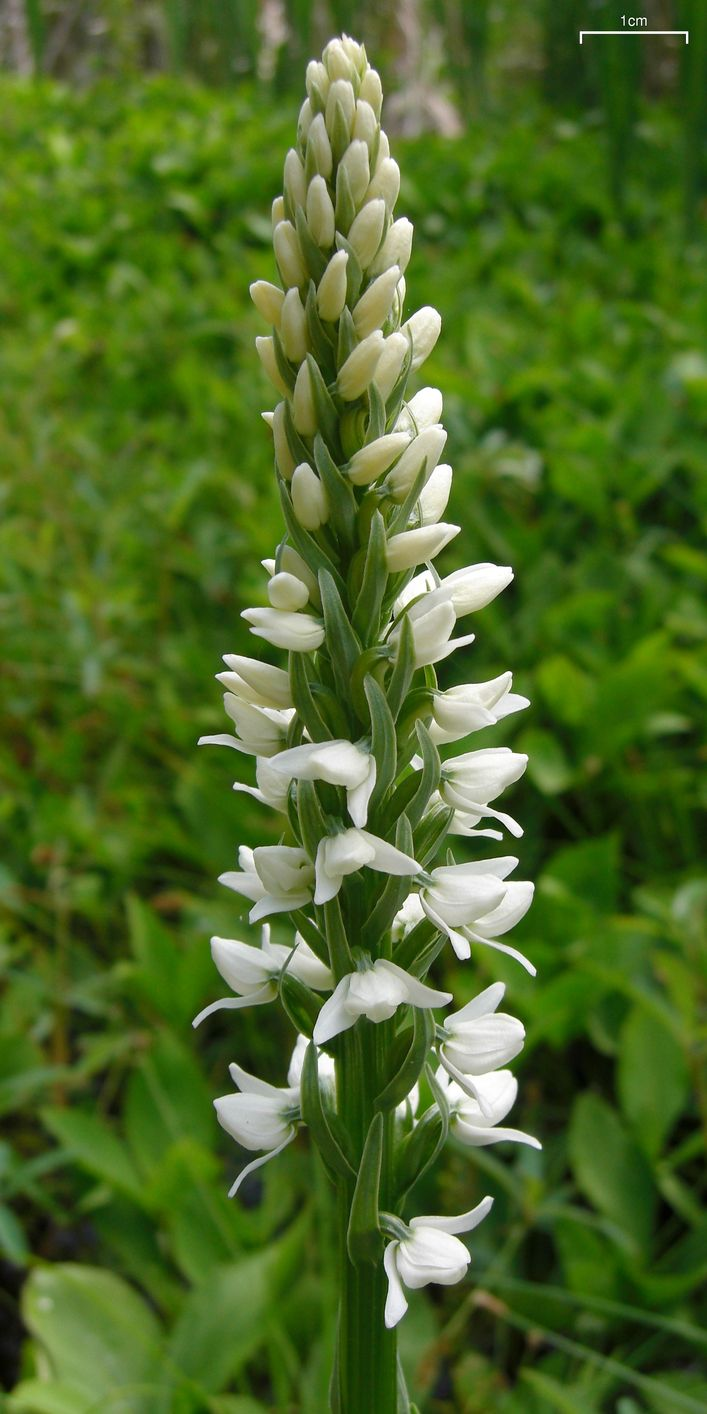
Inflorescence, British Columbia

== Taxonomy ==
Platanthera dilatata was scientifically described by Frederick Traugott Pursh in 1813 and named Orchis dilatata. It was moved to the genus Platanthera in 1833 by Lewis Caleb Beck crediting John Lindley. Together with its genus it is classified in the family Orchidaceae.

Three varieties are accepted:

Image	Name	Distribution
	Platanthera dilatata var. albiflora	Colorado to Alaska and Kamchatka
	Platanthera dilatata var. dilatata	Colorado to Alaska, Great Lakes and northeastern US and Canada, absent in most of the Great Plains
	Platanthera dilatata var. leucostachys	western US and Canada, from Baja California to Alaska

Platanthera dilatata has 37 synonyms of the species or one of its three varieties.

Table of Synonyms
Name	Year	Rank	Synonym of:	Notes
Habenaria borealis var. albiflora Cham.	1828	variety	var. albiflora	≡ hom.
Habenaria dilatata (Pursh) Hook.	1823	species	P. dilatata	≡ hom.
Habenaria dilatata var. albiflora (Cham.) Correll	1943	variety	var. albiflora	≡ hom.
Habenaria dilatata var. leucostachys (Lindl.) Ames	1910	variety	var. leucostachys	≡ hom.
Habenaria flagellans S.Watson	1880	species	var. leucostachys	= het.
Habenaria graminifolia (Rydb.) J.K.Henry	1915	species	var. leucostachys	= het.
Habenaria leptoceratitis J.K.Henry	1915	species	var. leucostachys	= het.
Habenaria leucostachys (Lindl.) S.Watson	1880	species	var. leucostachys	≡ hom.
Habenaria leucostachys var. robusta (Rydb.) J.K.Henry	1915	variety	var. leucostachys	= het.
Habenaria leucostachys var. virida Jeps.	1921	variety	var. leucostachys	= het.
Habenaria pedicellata S.Watson	1877	species	var. leucostachys	= het.
Limnorchis dilatata (Pursh) Rydb.	1901	species	P. dilatata	≡ hom.
Limnorchis dilatata subsp. albiflora (Cham.) Á.Löve & W.Simon	1968	subspecies	var. albiflora	≡ hom.
Limnorchis dilatata var. albiflora (Cham.) Efimov	2007	variety	var. albiflora	≡ hom.
Limnorchis dilatata var. leucostachys (Lindl.) Efimov	2008	variety	var. leucostachys	≡ hom.
Limnorchis dilatata var. linearifolia Rydb.	1901	variety	var. dilatata	= het.
Limnorchis foliosa Rydb.	1901	species	var. dilatata	= het.
Limnorchis fragrans Rydb.	1901	species	var. dilatata	= het.
Limnorchis graminifolia Rydb.	1901	species	var. leucostachys	= het.
Limnorchis leptoceratitis Rydb.	1901	species	var. dilatata	= het.
Limnorchis leucostachys (Lindl.) Rydb.	1900	species	var. leucostachys	≡ hom.
Limnorchis leucostachys subsp. robusta (Rydb.) Piper & Beattie	1915	subspecies	var. leucostachys	= het.
Limnorchis leucostachys var. robusta Rydb.	1901	variety	var. leucostachys	= het.
Orchis agastachys Fisch. ex Lindl.	1835	species	var. dilatata	= het.
Orchis dilatata Pursh	1813	species	P. dilatata	≡ hom.
Piperia dilatata (Pursh) Szlach. & Rutk.	2000	species	P. dilatata	≡ hom.
Piperia dilatata var. albiflora (Cham.) Szlach. & Rutk.	2000	variety	var. albiflora	≡ hom.
Piperia dilatata var. leucostachys (Lindl.) Szlach. & Rutk.	2000	variety	var. leucostachys	≡ hom.
Platanthera cylindrica Bach.Pyl.	1826	species	var. dilatata	= het.
Platanthera dilatata var. angustifolia Hook.	1839	variety	var. dilatata	= het.
Platanthera graminea Lindl.	1835	species	var. albiflora	= het., nom. illeg.
Platanthera hyperborea var. dilatata (Pursh) Rchb.f.	1851	variety	P. dilatata	≡ hom.
Platanthera hyperborea var. graminea Rchb.f.	1851	variety	var. albiflora	= het.
Platanthera hyperborea var. leucostachys (Lindl.) Kraenzl.	1901	variety	var. leucostachys	≡ hom.
Platanthera leucostachys Lindl.	1835	species	var. leucostachys	≡ hom.
Platanthera lindleyi Steud.	1841	species	var. albiflora	= het.
Tulotis albiflora Raf.	1833	species	var. dilatata	= het.
Notes: ≡ homotypic synonym; = heterotypic synonym

== Uses ==
British Columbian Native Americans used the sweet-smelling flowers in washing themselves.
