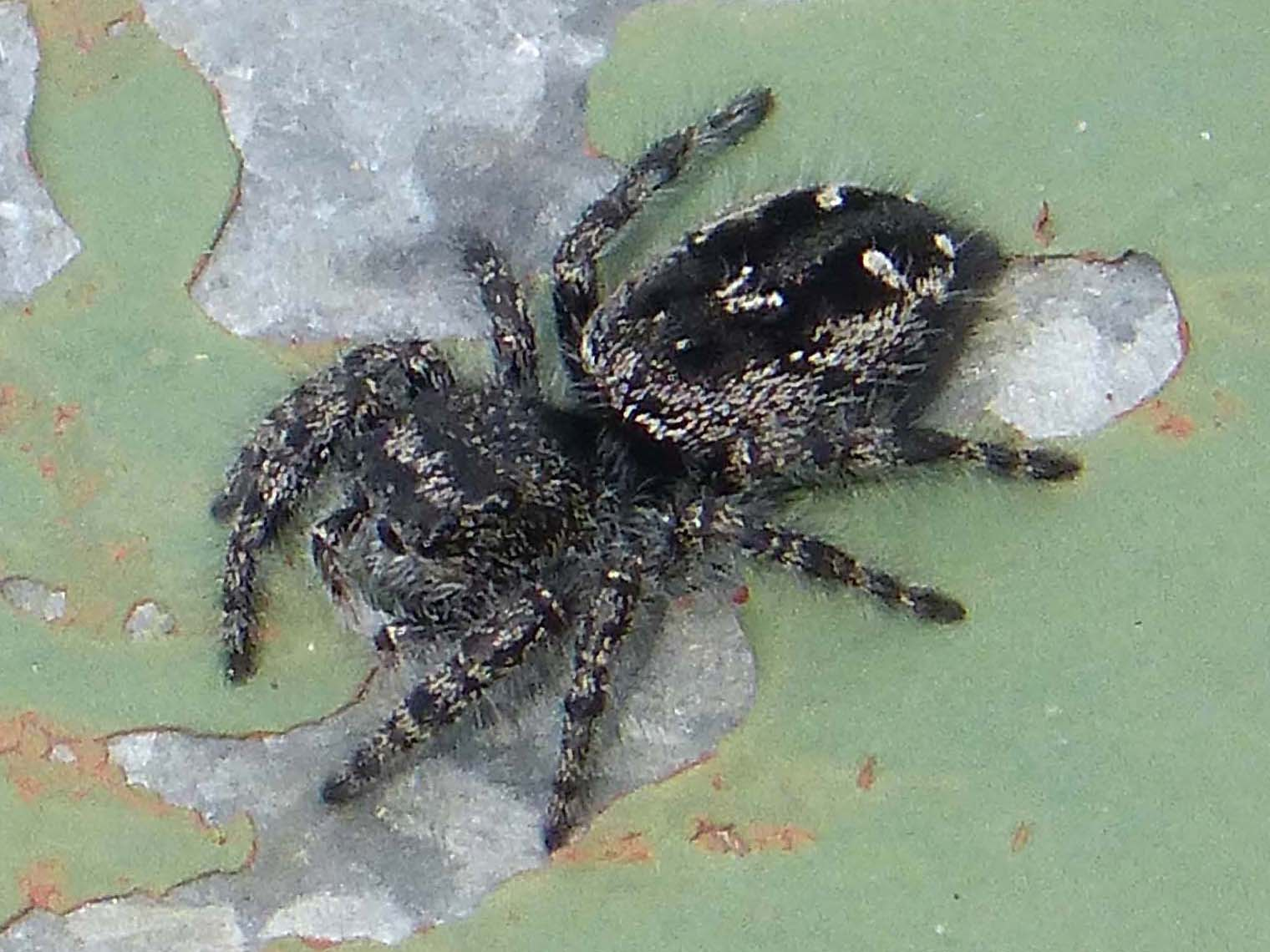
- Female in Jasper, Alberta
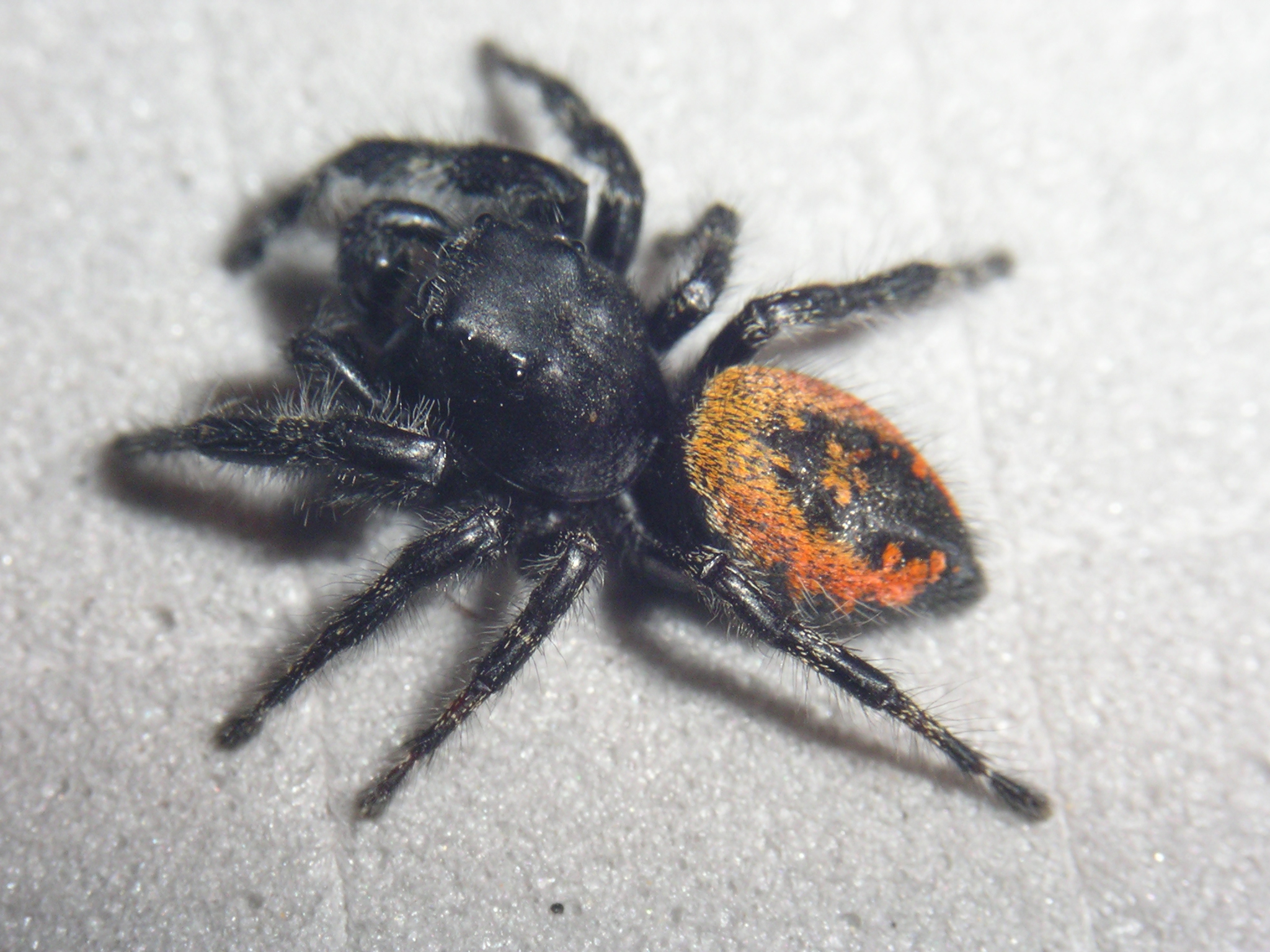
- Male near Owl River, Alberta

Scientific classification
- Kingdom: Animalia
- Phylum: Arthropoda
- Subphylum: Chelicerata
- Class: Arachnida
- Order: Araneae
- Infraorder: Araneomorphae
- Family: Salticidae
- Genus: Phidippus
- Species: P. borealis

Binomial name
- Phidippus borealis Banks, 1895

Synonyms
- Phidippus altanus

= Phidippus borealis =

Species of spider

Phidippus borealis, the boreal tufted jumping spider, is a species of jumping spider which occurs in Canada and the northern United States.
