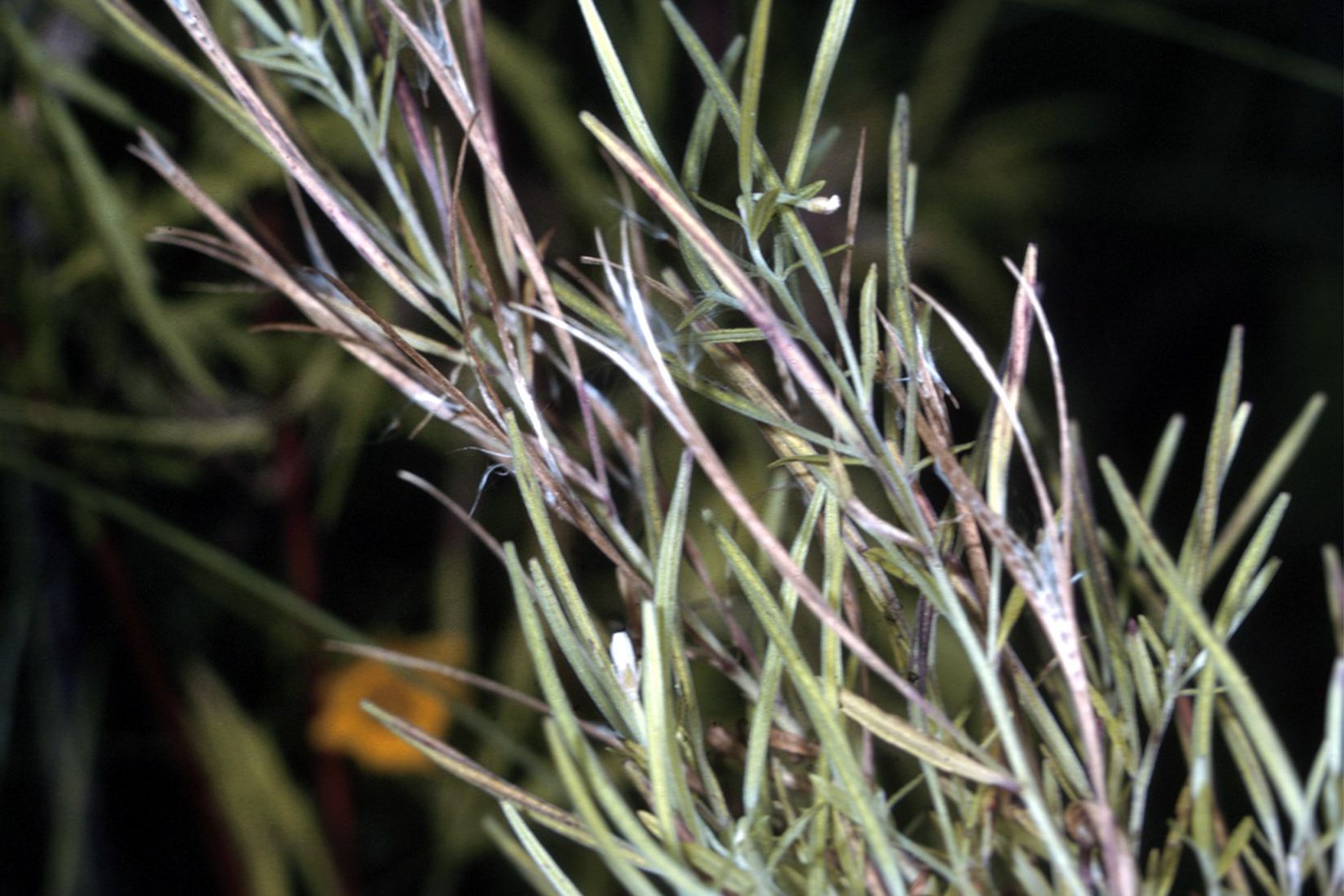

Conservation status
- Secure (NatureServe)

Scientific classification
- Kingdom: Plantae
- Clade: Tracheophytes
- Clade: Angiosperms
- Clade: Eudicots
- Clade: Rosids
- Order: Myrtales
- Family: Onagraceae
- Genus: Epilobium
- Species: E. leptophyllum

Binomial name
- Epilobium leptophyllum Raf.

Synonyms
- List: Epilobium densum var. nesophilum Fernald; Epilobium leptophyllum f. umbrosum (Hausskn.) Fernald; Epilobium lineare f. umbrosum Hausskn.; Epilobium nesophilum (Fernald) Fernald; Epilobium oliganthum var. gracile Farw.; Epilobium palustre var. gracile (Farw.) Dorn; Epilobium rosmarinifolium Pursh; Epilobium squamatum Nutt. ex Pursh; Epilobium tenellum Raf.

= Epilobium leptophyllum =

Plant species in the willowherb family

Epilobium leptophyllum is a species of flowering plant in the evening primrose family known by the common names bog willowherb and linear-leaved willowherb. It is native to much of eastern and northern North America, where it grows in moist areas, such as bogs. It is a perennial herb growing up to a meter tall and spreading with tiny stolons. The leaves are generally linear in shape but may be wider to nearly oval, and reach up to about 7.5 centimeters. The inflorescence is a raceme of small flowers with white to pink petals a few millimeters long. The fruit is a hairy, elongated capsule up to 8 centimeters in length.
