= McDonald's and unions =

McDonald's relation to unions by country

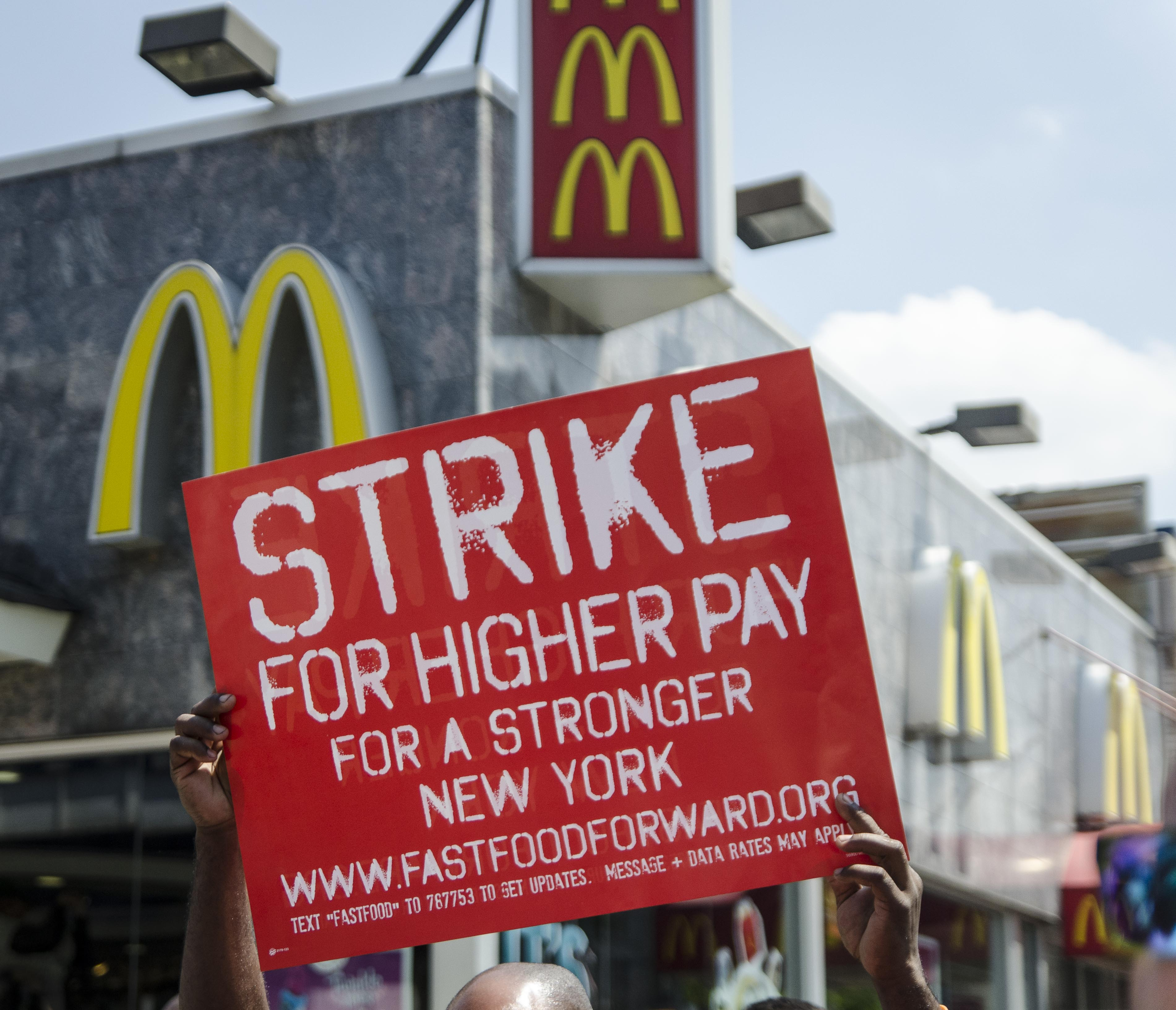
A July 29, 2013 protest outside a McDonald's in New York City

McDonald's is one of the largest fast food chains in the world. The vast majority of its restaurants operate as franchises. The ownership and legal structures significantly impact the bargaining power and industrial relations between McDonald's and its workers.

== Surveillance ==
In a 2021 Vice News report, it was revealed that McDonald's engaged in corporate surveillance of union organizers and McDonald workers in Chicago and London involved with the Fight for $15 campaign which is financed by the US based Service Employees International Union.

== Australia ==
In 2020, a matter brought by the Retail and Fast Food Workers Union (RAFFWU) resulted in a franchisee being fined A$82,000 for denying staff members toilet breaks. It was the first time a union had successfully prosecuted McDonalds.

== Austria ==
As of 1999, McDonald's Austria had 4,000 workers across 80 restaurants. 80% of these restaurants operate as franchisees. While workers were covered by collective agreements of HGPD union (which later merged into Vida) since 1977 when McDonald's opened in Austria, McDonald's relationship with trade unions was non-existent until 1994.

In contrast to the works council system in Germany, Austrian labor law requires candidates to be EU citizens, which is a challenge for the ~70% migrant workers of McDonald's Austria. With no works council members, trade unions are not easily able to monitor compliance with existing collective agreements.

== Denmark ==
McDonald's Denmark has 4,000 workers across 80 restaurants. 90% of these restaurants operate as franchises. When McDonald's arrived in Denmark in 1981, it engaged in industrial disputes with Restaurant Trade Union, before concluding a regional collective agreement in 1989. In theory, every restaurant could have union representatives and no cooperation committees (Danish equivalent to works council). As of 1999, only one restaurant had a union representative, and none had a cooperation committee.

== Germany ==
McDonald's Germany employs 65,000 workers across its 1,470 restaurants. 1,313 (or 90%) of these restaurants are managed as franchises. McDonald's Germany notably does not have any employee representatives on its Supervisory Board, despite having over 50,000 employees, well above the legal threshold of 2,000 employees specified in the Co-determination Act. This is because it is wholly registered under the American McDonald's Corporation in Chicago, Illinois, which is permitted under the German-American Trade Agreement.

Works councils can be set up in any establishment in Germany with 5 or more employees. In theory, every single McDonald restaurant could have a works council. In 2002, 50 restaurants out of 1,150 restaurants had works councils. Since 1999, a company-wide Central Works Council (GBR) was established.

A study by the Dortmund Social Research Center accuses McDonald's of actively obstructing the formation of works councils at individual locations. As of 2020, 95% of all McDonald’s restaurants did not have a works council. There were approximately 20 works councils for roughly 1,500 restaurants. Since 1999, a company-wide Central Works Council (GBR) was established.

The food and beverage trade union NGG alleges that McDonald's engages in union busting and retaliates against union affiliated Works Councils. Allegations include changing the ownership of union friendly restaurants into separate holding companies (so they cannot participate in the GBR election) and setting up a parallel employer friendly Central Works Council, with the two competing for legal legitimacy.

== Japan ==
McDonald's Japan was first established in the Ginza district of Tokyo in 1971. The majority (70 percent) of McDonald's Japan restaurants are managed directly by the corporation; the remaining restaurants are operated as franchises, overwhelmingly by former McDonald's employees, as of 2012.

The McDonald's Japan Union (Nihon Makudonarudo Yunion) was established on 15 May 2006 with 200 initial members, later on with the support of RENGO, the Japanese Trade Union Confederation. Unpaid overtime and working conditions of full and part-time employees were some of the expressed factors for forming a union.

=== Overtime lawsuit ===
In 2005, Takano Hiroshi, a McDonald's store manager (tenchō) visited Tokyo Managers Union (Japanese: 東京管理職ユニオン, romanized: Tokyo Kanrishoku Union), a community union to file a grievance against McDonald's over hundreds of hours of missing overtime pay and employee misclassification. Shortly afterwards, labor inspectors visited several restaurants, including his worksite, and mandated personnel improvements. Management subsequently accused Takano of alerting them. After failed negotiations, Takano's lawsuit was resolved in a court ruling in 2008, with back pay and overtime afforded to all tenchō employees. McDonald's resisted changing its practices fundamentally, for example providing overtime pay, but also reducing the base wages so that there is little net difference.

== New Zealand ==
McDonald's New Zealand workers are represented by Unite Union. Unite Union has successfully advocated for:

- Remediation for miscalculated holiday pay between 2009 and 2020 for "as many as 60,000" current and former employees
- Getting rid of zero-hour contracts for all employees
- Abolishing youth-rates for employees under 18

== United Kingdom ==
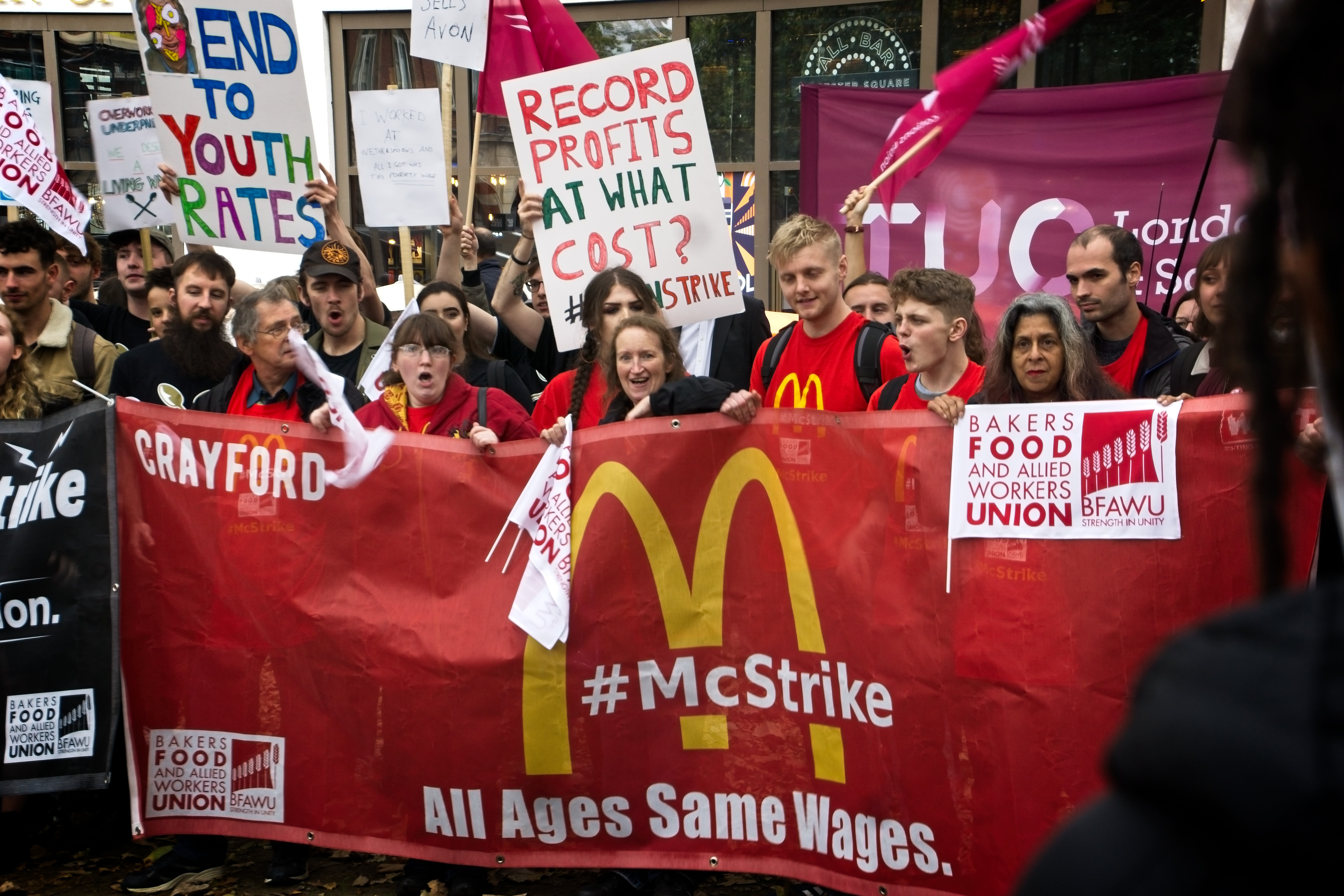
McDonald's workers striking against coercive labour practices and low wages, 2018

McDonald's United Kingdom was first established in 1974. 115,000 workers operated across 1,249 restaurants as of 2017. The vast majority of employees have zero-hour contracts.

In 1999, McDonald's Workers Resistance, a radical non-hierarchical workers' organisation, was formed at a McDonald's outlet in Glasgow, and remained active through to 2004. On 16 October 2002, they organized a "Global Day of Action" which saw labour action in Europe, North America and Oceania. The group's efforts were supported and promoted by the McLibel Support Campaign, which aimed to support London Greenpeace members who were sued by the company for slander due to distributing leaflets which were critical of the company.

On 4 September 2017, the first strike actions were organized at two restaurants in Cambridge and Crayford with the support of the Bakers, Food and Allied Workers Union.

== United States ==
McDonald's first opened in California in 1940. It operates 14,300 franchises. None of the restaurants are unionized. Fight For $15 is the most active labor related campaign, and is funded partly by the SEIU.

McDonald's franchise model and lack of joint-employer status means that each and every single individual restaurant would have to individually vote to unionize. The NLRB in October 2023 paved the way for more expansive definition of joint-employment that would force McDonald's to directly negotiate with trade unions.

== See also ==
- Starbucks unions
- Apple worker organizations
- Criticism of McDonald's
