= Justice for Workers =

Canadian labour movement

- Predecessor: Fight for $15 and Fairness
- Founded at: Toronto, Canada
- Website: www.justice4workers.org

Justice for Workers: Decent Work for All (previously Fight for $15 and Fairness) is a Canadian campaign and movement focused on the rights and remuneration of low-wage workers.

== History ==
The Fight for $15 and Fairness campaign was launched in the spring of 2015, following the Fight for $15 campaign launch in the US in 2012. Initially the campaign focused on the unmet needs of low-wage workers in precarious employment in Ontario. In April 2015, the campaign organized Ontario-wide demonstrations.

After the passing of the Making Ontario Open for Business Act, 2018 reduced the Ontario Government's commitment to minimum wage, protesting continued on a smaller scale.

During 2020 and 2021, the campaign's activates expanded into Nova Scotia and Newfoundland and Labrador.

The "Justice for Workers" campaign was launched on May 1, 2021, as the next phase of the Ontario-wide campaign for decent work. The campaign aims to improve the working conditions of low-wage and precarious workers across Ontario. The campaign was created in response to the harsh realities of working conditions exposed by the pandemic. To achieve this, the campaign demands a $20-per-hour minimum wage, 10 permanent paid sick days, equal pay for equal work, permanent resident status for all and much more.

== Impact ==
The campaign has "terrified" Restaurant Brands International, the owners of Tim Hortons, and the campaign was credited with the inclusion of a $15 federal minimum wage in the 2021 Canadian federal budget.
