= Political positions of Andrew Cuomo =

Policies of Andrew Cuomo

The political positions of Andrew Cuomo have been reported from his career as Governor of New York, Attorney General of New York, and in the Department of Housing and Urban Development (including as the Secretary). Some of these policy positions have changed, while others remain unchanged.

== Economic policy ==
=== COVID-19 pandemic ===
Cuomo came to increased national prominence for his response to the COVID-19 pandemic as Governor of New York. New York was particularly hard-hit by the virus, and Cuomo took strong positions in favor of restrictions to combat the virus. During this time, he was also noted for his feud with President Donald Trump and the federal government's "failed response" to the pandemic.

On March 25, 2020, Cuomo and the New York State Department of Health issued an advisory requiring the admission of patients to nursing homes who test positive for the coronavirus and barred testing prospective nursing home patients. This order was revoked on May 10 after widespread criticism from medical experts. By then, as many as 4,500 COVID-19 infected patients had been sent to nursing homes in NY state. Over 6,000 New York state nursing home residents had died of COVID as of June 2020.

On January 28, 2021, an investigation conducted by state attorney general Letitia James concluded that the Cuomo administration undercounted COVID-19-related deaths at nursing homes by as much as 50%. On February 12, 2021, Melissa DeRosa, a top aide to Cuomo, said in a call with state Democratic leaders that the Cuomo administration intentionally delayed the release of data pertaining to deaths from COVID-19 within nursing homes in fear it would've triggered a potential federal investigation by the Department of Justice and given an advantage to political opponents. Calls to rescind Cuomo's emergency powers granted amidst the pandemic were launched within the New York State Senate immediately following this report, with 14 Democrats joining the Republican minority in the effort. On February 17, 2021, the Federal Bureau of Investigation and the U.S. attorney in Brooklyn announced they were investigating the incident.

=== Minimum wage ===
Cuomo supported raising the minimum wage as Governor of New York. He announced a phase-in plan to slowly transition to a $15 minimum wage. Some restaurant workers criticized the policy for largely leaving out tipped workers, as restaurant workers were not included in the bill.

=== Paid family leave ===
Cuomo is a strong supporter of paid family leave. He was instrumental in getting a family leave policy passed in New York. He claimed in 2018 that New York's program was the best in the country. During the COVID-19 pandemic, Cuomo referred to the supposed success of his family leave policy and how effective he claimed it to be in fighting the virus.

== Social policy ==
=== Abortion ===
Cuomo has consistently supported reproductive rights, including access to safe, legal abortion. In response to a Donald Trump claim on late-term abortion, Cuomo expressed that he believes late-term abortions are very rare, and he only supports them in the case of a non-viable fetus.

=== Drugs ===
Cuomo has supported the decriminalization of marijuana for most of his career, and signed a major bill to further this goal in 2019. In 2020, Cuomo supported fully legalizing marijuana in New York within the year.

Cuomo was given a grade of C− by NORML in 2016, indicating hardline anti-drug stances. Some, however, have claimed he has become more liberal on drug policy over time. In 2020, NORML gave Cuomo a grade of A, much higher than most American governors.

=== Gun control ===
Cuomo has been characterized as, and describes himself as, being one of the toughest gun control legislators. He has repeatedly touted New York as a model for gun control legislation. He has pushed for national gun control legislation in the same vein.

In 2020, Cuomo's budget included six new gun control bills, and more than two dozen sat in the state legislature. Gun manufacturer Remington offered to assist in New York's COVID-19 response, but Cuomo did not respond.

=== Same-sex marriage ===
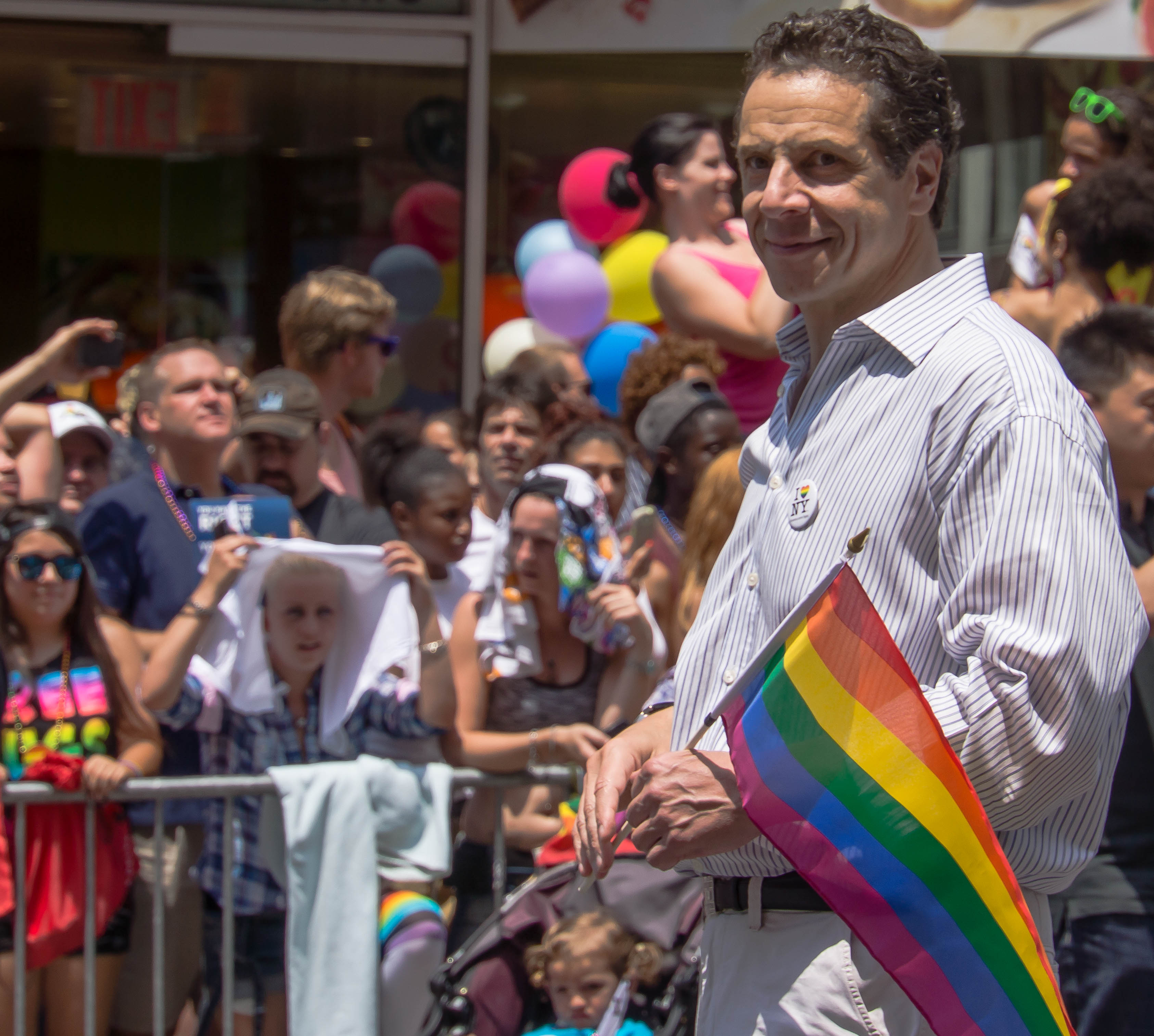
Cuomo at NYC Pride March in 2013

Cuomo was lauded for his efforts to pass same-sex marriage legislation. One prominent advocate stated that "for gay Americans, Mr. Cuomo was "the only national politician with hero status". Following the passage of the Marriage Equality Act, Cuomo was criticized for describing the viewpoints of same-sex marriage opponents as being "anti-American". On July 25, 2011, a lawsuit was filed in the New York Supreme Court, seeking an injunction against the Marriage Equality Act, alleging corruption and violations of the law in the process of passing the bill. The trial court initially held that the plaintiffs' case could proceed, but the decision was reversed on appeal.

Cuomo ordered a boycott of Indiana and North Carolina to protest their anti-LGBT laws.
