= Seattle's minimum wage ordinance =

On the May 1, 2014, Seattle's Mayor Ed Murray announced plans to increase Seattle's minimum wage to $15 per hour incrementally over the next few years. Seattle was the first big city in the United States to raise its minimum wage to $15 after the rise of the "Fight for 15 movement". This policy decision resulted in Seattle having the highest minimum wage of any major city in the United States. Once Seattle raised its minimum wage many other major cities around the country also took action to increase the pay of low wage workers. There has been much debate over the effects the increases to the minimum wage have had on employment and overall economic conditions in Seattle. To determine the impacts of the policy a number of studies have been conducted; the most notable being research by the University of Washington and the University of California, Berkeley.

== Seattle's minimum wage ==
=== Fight for $15 ===
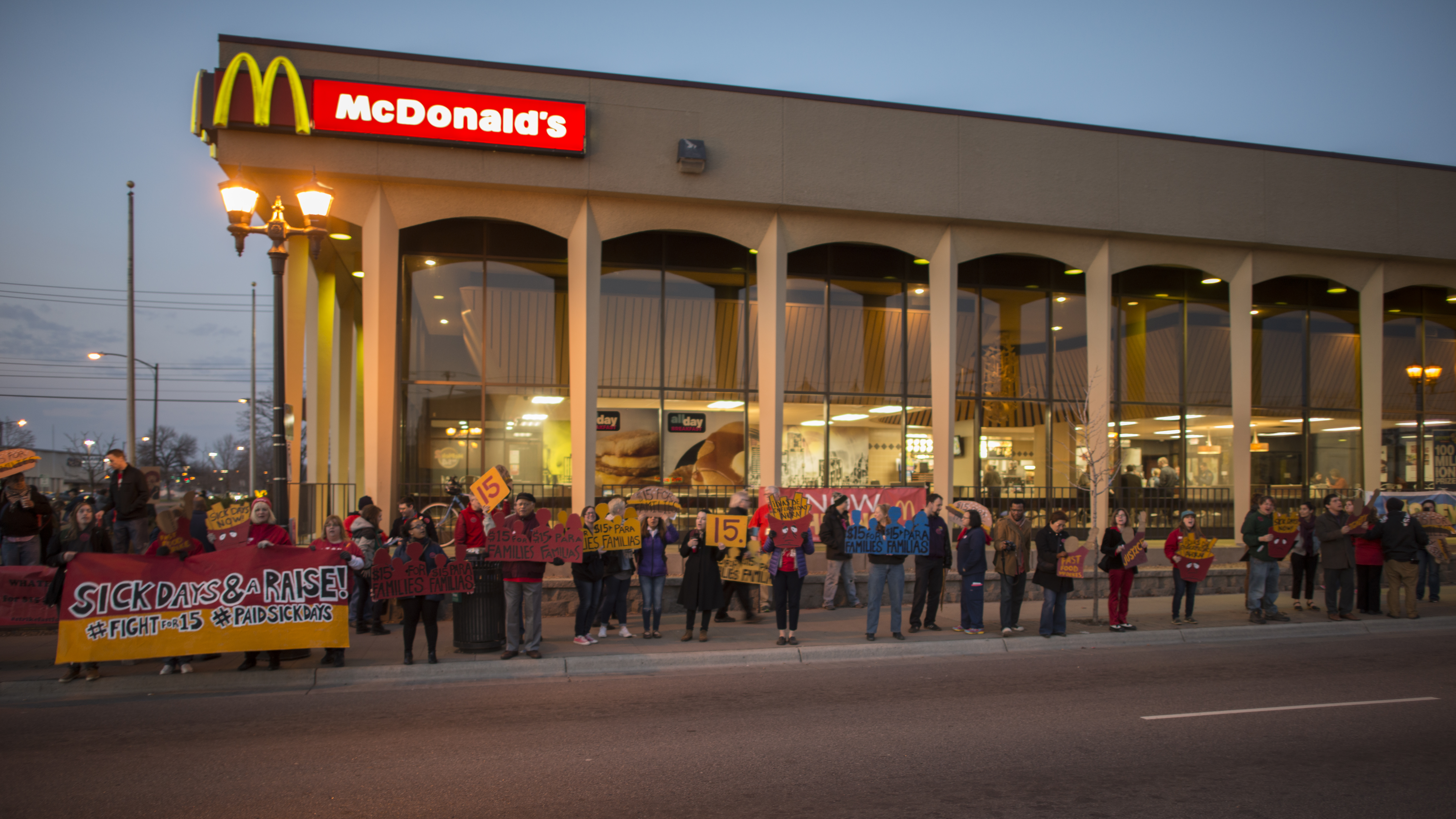
Fast food workers on strike for a higher minimum wage

Fight for $15 is a political movement that was started by the fast food industry employees to advocate for the federal minimum wage to be increased to $15 per hour. This political movement was first launched in 2012, starting in New York, unifying fast food workers in their struggle to cover their cost of living. The New York Times described the protest the “biggest wave of job actions in the history of America’s fast-food industry.” As the movement spread across the country more strikes and protests were organised as more low wage workers demanded a higher minimum wage and in May 2013 Seattle became the 7th city to join the fast food strikes. Later that year on August 29 Seattle was one of 60 cities that took part in the first coordinated national fast food strike in the US.

In 2013, Ed Murray was running as a candidate for the Mayor of Seattle with his main competitor Michael McGinn. In September that year Murray announced an "Economic Opportunity Agenda for Seattle" where he publicly endorsed a $15 minimum wage as well as declaring he would continue to raise the minimum wage further provided he had the support of the city council.

=== The minimum wage decision ===
Shortly after being elected to office Mayor Murray formed the Income Inequality Advisory Committee (IIAC) which included 24 representatives from Seattle's labour, small and large business, non-profits, chambers of commerce and philanthropy communities. Mayor Murray, along with the IIAC, created a policy framework with the intention of raising the city's minimum wage to $15 per hour. At the time of Mayor Murray's announcement to incrementally raise the minimum wage to $15 the city's minimum wage was $9.47 and the federal minimum wage was $7.25 which hadn't changed since 2007. On the day of the announcement of this new policy Mayor Murray stated:

"Throughout this process, I’ve had two goals: to get Seattle’s low-wage workers to $15-per-hour while also supporting our employers, and to avoid a costly battle at the ballot box between competing initiatives. We have a deal that I believe accomplishes both goals.”

Mayor Murray's $15 per hour minimum wage policy was developed with the aim of reducing inequality in Seattle by reversing the decline in real wages for the middle class that had occurred in previous years. Mayor Murray and the IIAC believed that increasing the wages of low income individuals would lead to a more robust economy with more sustainable prosperity and growth. Major Murray's policy did face some opposition from local businesses who were concerned that a higher minimum wage would force them to reduce their hiring of new employees and operating hours.

=== Minimum wage policy plan ===
Seattle's minimum wage ordinance started to take effect on April 1, 2015. Under the policy, small businesses (500 employees or less) would have a wage of $15 per hour by 2021. A temporary "compensation responsibility" of $15 per hour would have been established for small businesses by 2019. Businesses are able to fulfil this responsibility through employer paid healthcare, consumer paid tips and employer paid wages. Large businesses (more than 500 employees in Seattle or nationally) would have a wage of $15 per hour by 2017. The wages of employees with healthcare benefits would have the wage of $15 per hour by 2018. Once the $15 per hour wage has been achieved, the minimum wage will be increased according to the Consumer Price Index (CPI).

== Studies on the effect of the law ==
In 2014, after the Seattle City Council passed an ordinance that would incrementally raise their minimum wage to $15 / hour, they issued a request for proposals for a research team to study the impact of the ordinance. The RFP asked for five years of continued research, but unusually did not include any funding, though the city allocated $100,000 for 2015 and nothing thereafter. Researchers at the Evans School of Public Policy at the University of Washington were the only group of researchers to submit a proposal, and therefore won the contract. Their first paper in 2016 found that the minimum wage law was reducing job growth for low income workers.

In 2017, after the mayor was presented with a draft of the second year's study from the UW group, he shared that pre-publication study with Michael Reich's economics group at UC Berkeley and asked Reich's team to conduct another study on the effects of this ordinance which was released a week before the UW study was scheduled to be released, and (contrary to the UW study) found that Seattle's law was instead benefiting restaurant workers. Critics have noted that these events seem to show a clear intent by city leaders to undermine research that doesn't fit their narrative.

=== University of Washington ===
==== First study ====
The University of Washington published a study called "Minimum Wage Increases, Wages, and Low-Wage Employment: Evidence from Seattle" which focuses on evaluating the effects of the 2015 increase of the minimum wage to $11 per hour and the additional increase to $13 in 2016 on citywide employment and the number of hours worked. This paper examines the impacts the minimum wage increases had on all low wage employees across different industries and worker demographics in the state of Washington. This paper uses data from Washington's Employment Security Department, which collects quarterly payroll records for all employees paid wages in the state of Washington. Employers are obligated to report the number of hours worked by their employees. This data allowed the University of Washington to calculate average hourly wages and to identify the jobs and industries that have been affected by the increases to the minimum wage.

The University of Washington came to the conclusion that the increase of the minimum wage from $11 to $13 reduced the numbers of hours worked by employees in low paying jobs by 9% while simultaneously increasing the hourly wages of these jobs by 3%. It was calculated that the minimum wage ordinance reduced low wage workers' earning by $125 on average in 2016. The study concluded that increasing the minimum wage has reduced the employment opportunities for low income workers.

==== Second study ====
The University of Washington released another study in 2018 called "Minimum Wage, Increases and Individual Employment Trajectories" with the intention of determining the effect of Seattle's minimum wage increases on individuals who were hired in low paying jobs shortly before the wage increases in 2015 and 2016. The study used data during the period where the minimum wage increased from $9.47 to a high of $13 an hour. The university used longitudinal workforce data, data that is repeatedly collected from the same individuals or businesses over time, from the state of Washington's Employment Security Department (WESD) to understand the impact wage hikes had on the future employment of recently employed workers in low wage jobs. This was achieved by looking at changes to wages, number of hours worked, unemployment and turnover of low wage workers who were hired shortly before the minimum wage increases. Control groups were selected from the outer areas of the state of Washington for comparison.

The study excluded employment for multi-site businesses as the data collected from WESD were too difficult to locate and track as these businesses held more than one Unemployment Insurance account each. Workers with two jobs, an employer in Seattle and an employer outside of Seattle, on the minimum wage were also excluded as these workers were thought to only be partially affected by Seattle's minimum wage changes. Consequently, the paper investigation involved 53% of workers in Washington state earning less than $11 per hour in the first quarter 2015 and 53% of workers earning less than $13 per hour in the fourth quarter 2015.

The data collected in this study contradicted evidence from the university's previous research which indicated the second increase to the minimum wage reduced the total earning of employees in Seattle's low wage market. The evidence from the second study indicated that low wage workers' pretax weekly earning increased on average by $10 as a result of Seattle's minimum wage ordinance. The collected data also suggested that businesses responded to the higher minimum wage by increasing the proportion of experienced workers in their workforce. The study emphasis's that during the period in which this research was conducted "Seattle was undergoing an exceptional economic boom driven by rapid expansion of its high-skilled workforce", providing a confounding variable that may have also affected wages and employment.

=== University of California, Berkeley ===
==== First study ====
The University of California, Berkeley, published a study in June 2017 on the impacts of the increases to Seattle's minimum wage called "Seattle's Minimum Wage Experience 2015-16". This paper examines county and city level data collected in the Quarterly Census of Employment and Wages from 2009 to 2016. A synthetic control group was constructed from county level data gathered from other parts of the state of Washington and the US to provide a comparison to Seattle. This synthetic control group was created to match Seattle for the six-year period before the minimum wage ordinance took effect. The university decided to focus on Seattle's food service industry as a large percentage of its workforce are minimum wage workers.

The impact the increases to the minimum wage had on employment and wages in this industry was used to make inferences on the policy's effects on low paid workers. The study concluded that increases to the minimum wage up to $13 per hour successfully raised the incomes of low wage workers without causing lower employment in the food services industry.

==== Second study ====
The University of California, Berkeley, released another study on September 6, 2018, called "The New Wave of Local Minimum Wage Policies: Evidence from Six Cities". This paper examines the impact of many new labour market policies that have been implemented across 6 large cities in US: Chicago, the District of Columbia, Oakland, San Francisco, San Jose and Seattle. All these policies are characterised by increasing the minimum wage to $12-$15 per hour. This study is similar to the one that preceded it, "Seattle's Minimum Wage Experience 2015-16", in that it focuses on the food services industry due to it being a large employer of low wage workers. The data used in this paper extended to late 2016 when Seattle's minimum wage had increased to $13 per hour. The control group used for comparison consisted of highly populated counties in metropolitan areas across the U.S.

This paper used data from U.S. Bureau of Labour Statistics' Quarterly Census of Employment and Wages (QCEW). The employers that report their data on employment and wages to the QCEW are a part of the Unemployment Insurance system which includes more than 95% of jobs in the US. The 6 major cities in the study experienced strong private sector growth and economic expansion in comparison with the rest of the US during the period the employment data was collected. To prevent this strong growth from hiding any negative impacts of the minimum wage increase, the study isolated the causal effects of the local minimum wage policies by using event study and synthetic control methods.

The evidence found suggested that low wage workers across the US, including Seattle, benefited from policy decisions to increase the minimum wage to a rate of pay between $10-$13. Earnings in the food services industry were found to have increased between 1.3% and 2.5% across the 6 cities as a result of a 10% increase in the minimum wage. The paper also couldn't find any negative impacts on employment across the 6 cities that would have resulted from a higher minimum wage. This study is only limited to food services industry, other low wage industry could have experienced different impacts on employment.
