= McDonald's Germany =

Fast food restaurant chain subsidiary

- Company type: Subsidiary
- Industry: Restaurant
- Genre: Fast food
- Founded: November 22, 1971 (first restaurant)
- Headquarters: Munich, Germany
- Number of locations: 1,382 (as of 2026)
- Area served: Germany
- Key people: Holger Beeck (Franchisee); Bane Knezevic (Franchisee)
- Products: Hamburgers; chicken; french fries; soft drinks; milkshakes; desserts; pies; coffee; breakfast
- Services: Franchising
- Parent: McDonald's Corporation
- Website: mcdonalds.de

McDonald's Germany is the German subsidiary of the international fast food restaurant chain McDonald's. Its first location opened in 1971 in Munich, Germany. McDonald's Germany currently has over 1,382 restaurants operating nationwide, serving an estimated sixty million people each week.

As with McDonald's locations worldwide, the franchise primarily sells hamburgers, cheeseburgers, chicken, french fries, breakfast items, soft drinks, milkshakes and desserts. In response to changing consumer tastes, the company has expanded its menu to include salads, fish, wraps, smoothies, and fruit. The company also operates the McCafé chain within many of its stores.

McDonald's German operations are based in Munich.
