= Fight for $15 =

Political movement in the United States

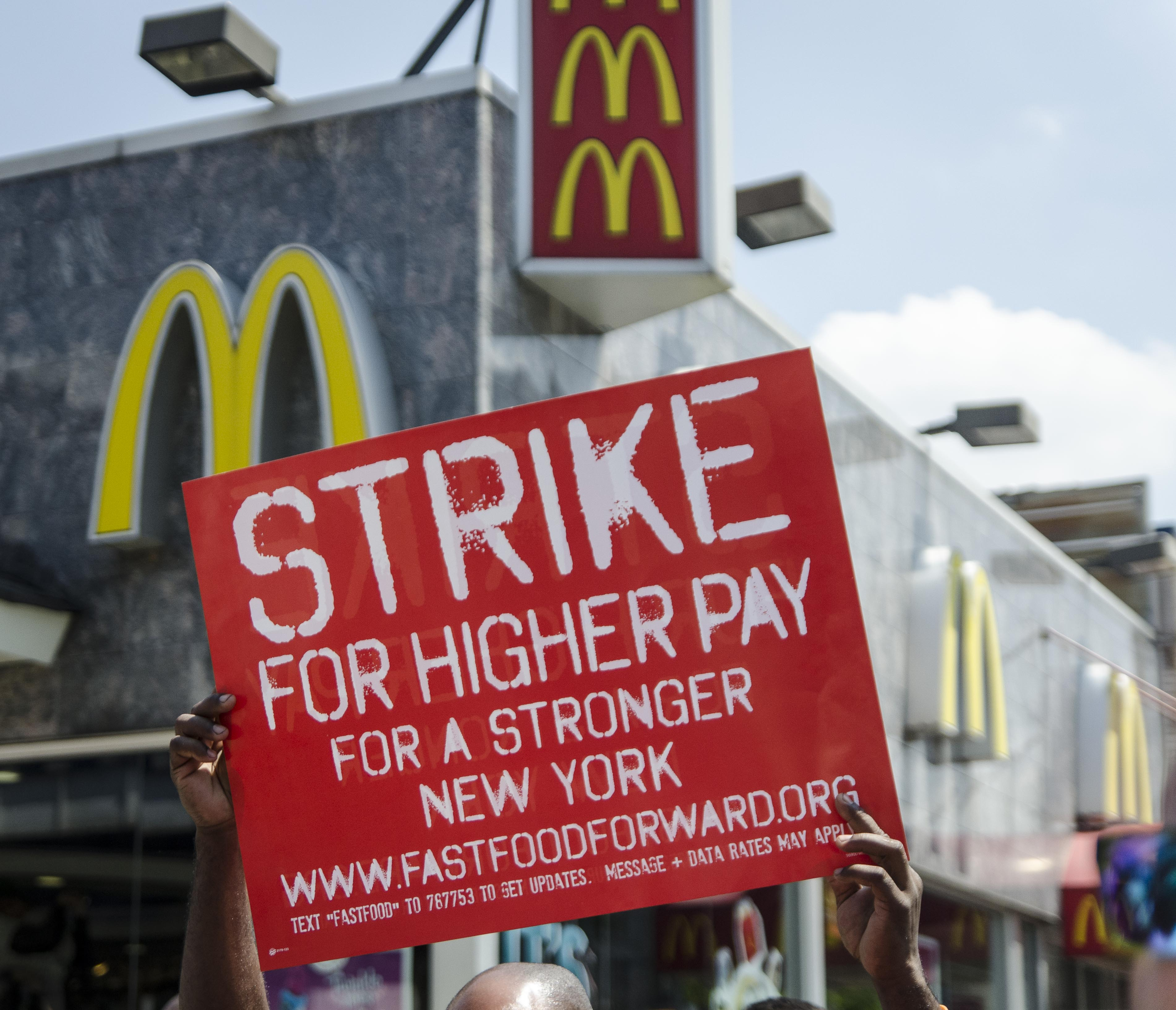
A July 29, 2013, protest outside a McDonald's in New York City.

US map of hourly minimum wages by state and District of Columbia (D.C.).

Percent of workers earning less than $15 per hour, by state. Concerning the gray n/a states CEPR wrote: "States that had minimum wages of at least $15 and those that were between $14 and $15 were not analyzed."

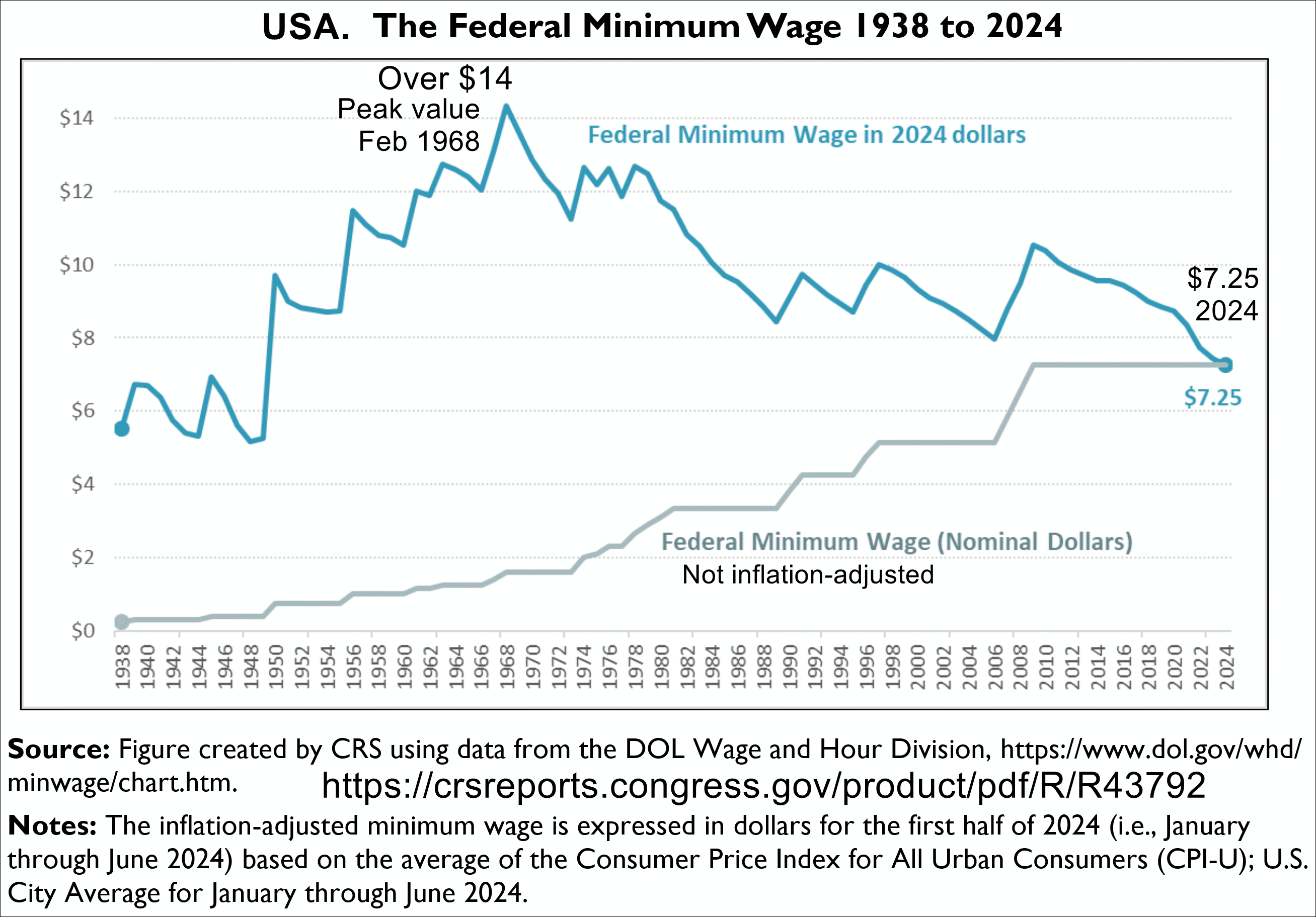
History of the federal minimum wage. Lower line is nominal dollars. Top line is inflation-adjusted.

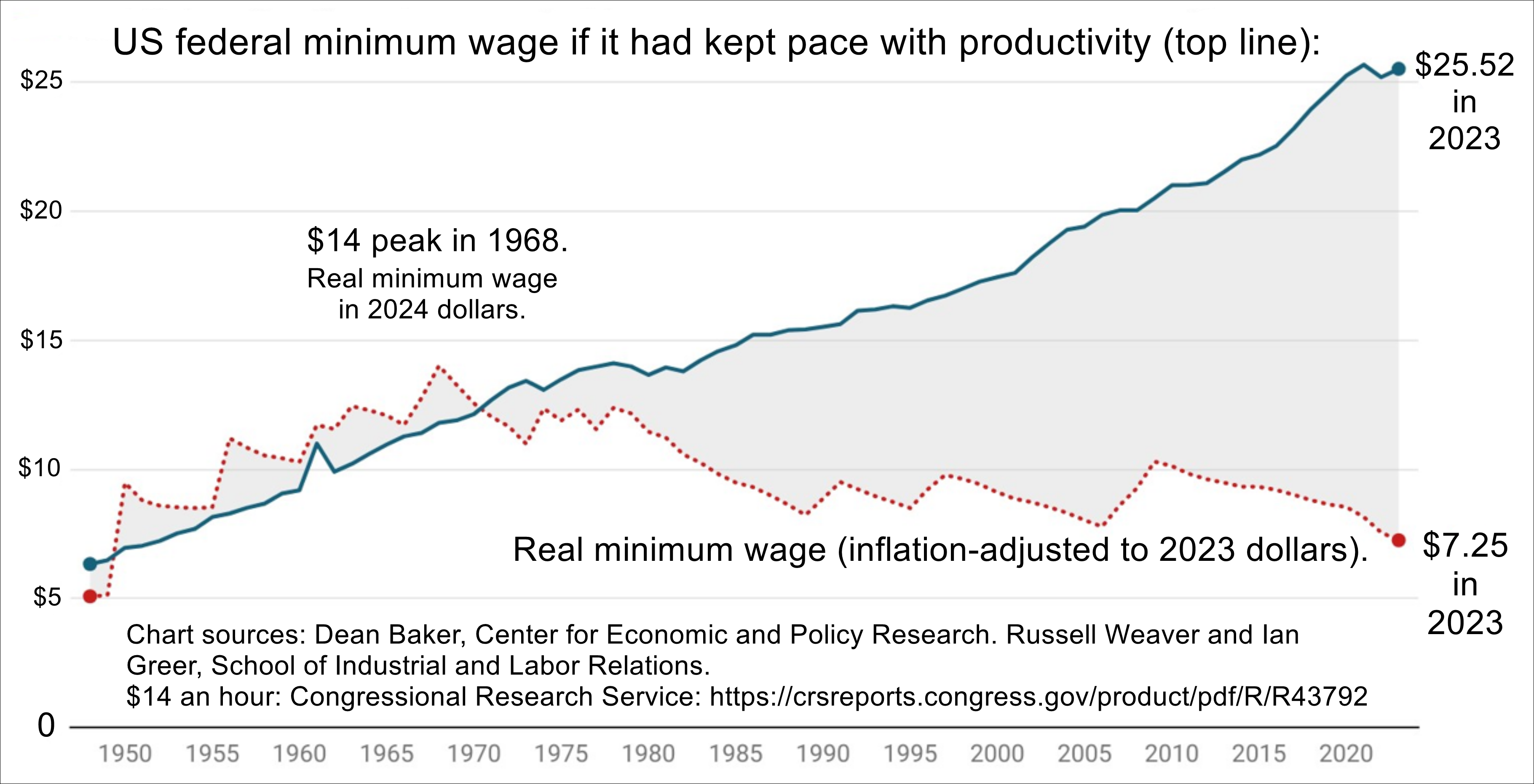
US federal minimum wage if it had kept pace with the average worker's productivity. Also, the inflation-adjusted minimum wage.

The Fight for $15 is an American political movement advocating for the minimum wage to be raised to $15 per hour. The federal minimum wage was last set at $7.25 per hour in 2009. The movement has involved strikes by child care, home healthcare, airport, gas station, convenience store, and fast food workers for increased wages and the right to form a labor union. The "Fight for $15" movement started in 2012, in response to workers' inability to cover their costs on such a low salary, as well as the stressful work conditions of many of the service jobs which pay the minimum wage.

The movement has seen successes on the state and local level. California was the first state to act in 2016. Virginia was the most recent to act in 2026. Seventeen states and Washington, D.C. have now passed laws that gradually raise their state minimum wage to at least $15 per hour. Four more states are expected to reach $15 by 2027 due to inflation adjustments. This will mean 51% of the country will have a $15 minimum wage by 2027. Twenty states with 37% of the population are currently stuck at the federal minimum. Major cities such as San Francisco, New York City and Seattle, where the cost of living is significantly higher, acted earlier to raise their municipal minimum wage to $15 per hour with some exceptions. On the federal level, the $15 proposal has become significantly more popular among Democratic politicians in the past few years, and was added to the party's platform in 2016 after Bernie Sanders advocated for it in his presidential campaign.

In 2019, the Democratic-controlled House of Representatives passed the Raise the Wage Act, which would have gradually raised the minimum wage to $15 per hour. It was not taken up in the Republican-controlled Senate. In January 2021, Democrats in the Senate and House of Representatives reintroduced the bill. In February 2021, the Congressional Budget Office released a report on the Raise the Wage Act of 2021 which estimated that incrementally raising the federal minimum wage to $15 an hour by 2025 would benefit 17 million workers, but would also reduce employment by 1.4 million people. On February 27, 2021, the Democratic-controlled House passed the American Rescue Plan pandemic relief package, which included a gradual minimum wage increase to $15 per hour. The measure was ultimately removed from the Senate version of the bill.

In the 2020s, Fight for $15 has become a Fight for $20, particularly at the local level.

== Strikes and protests in the United States ==
On November 29, 2012, over 100 fast-food workers from McDonald's, Burger King, Wendy's, Domino's, Papa John's, Kentucky Fried Chicken and Pizza Hut walked off their jobs in New York City in strike for higher wages, better working conditions and the right to form a union without retaliation from their managers. Many workers were making the minimum wage at the time. However, many allegedly were making, and are currently making, less than the minimum wage due to wage theft on the part of their employers. This was the largest strike in the history of the fast food industry. Earning less than a living wage has forced many fast food workers to have multiple jobs and obtain forms of government assistance such as food stamps to afford basic food, shelter and clothing. This rate is declared to be below what the Massachusetts Institute of Technology considers to be a "living wage" (based on cost of living and necessary expenses) for all five boroughs of New York City. Time described this initial effort as seizing on the public's concern with economic inequality in the United States as stimulated by the Occupy Wall Street movement in 2011 and 2012.

The strike was organized by over 40 personnel from New York Communities for Change, Service Employees International Union, UnitedNY, and the Black Institute. On April 4, 2013 (the 45th anniversary of the assassination of Martin Luther King Jr. during the Memphis sanitation strike), more than 200 fast-food workers went on strike in New York City. Hundreds of other workers went on strike in Chicago on April 24, in Detroit on May 10, in St. Louis on May 9 and 10, in Milwaukee on May 15 and in Seattle on May 30.

On July 29, approximately 2,200 workers went on strike in all of the cities where fast-food workers had previously gone on strike with the addition of Flint, Michigan and Kansas City, Missouri.

A coordinated national fast-food strike took place on August 29. In Seattle, Washington, the protests influenced candidate Ed Murray to release an "Economic Opportunity Agenda for Seattle". This agenda was later partially adopted by the Seattle city council, which voted to raise the minimum wage to $15.

On December 6, 2013, further fast food strikes occurred nationwide in a campaign aimed at raising the minimum wage to $15 per hour.

On September 4, 2014, another national strike took place in more than 150 cities, but this time thousands of home care workers joined the fast food workers. In another departure from previous protests, organizers shifted tactics and encouraged acts of civil disobedience such as sit ins to further draw attention to their cause. Between 159 and 436 arrests were made. Striking fast food workers from Ferguson, Missouri, were arrested in Times Square, New York City, in solidarity with workers there nearly a month after the police shooting of Michael Brown.

On December 4, 2014, thousands of fast food workers walked off of the job in 190 U.S. cities to engage in further protests for $15 an hour and union representation, and were joined by caregivers, airport workers, and employees at discount and convenience stores. The strikes were also bolstered by anger over the deaths of Michael Brown and Eric Garner at the hands of police. Chants of "15 and a union" were accompanied by "Hands up, don't shoot" and "I can't breathe". Kendall Fells, organizing director for Fast Food Forward, claimed the strikes were "fights against injustice in the U.S." Organizers from Black Lives Matter supported the strike.

On April 15, 2015, tens of thousands of fast food workers in more than 200 cities took to the streets again in what labor organizers have described as the largest protest by low-wage workers in US history. In their campaign to raise the minimum wage to $15 an hour, labor activists and fast food workers were joined by home care assistants, Walmart workers, child-care aides, airport workers, adjunct professors and others who work low-wage jobs. Gary Chaison, a professor of industrial relations at Clark University, noted that this protest movement is unique among labor disputes:

What is really significant about the Fight for $15 movement is – most labor disputes, look inside, they're about a group of workers covered by a collective bargaining agreement. In the Fight for $15, unions are helping to organize on a community basis, a group of workers who are on the fringe of the economy. It's not about union members protecting themselves. It's about moving other people up. This is the whole civil rights movement all over again.

Another strike took place in November 2015. U.S. Senator Bernie Sanders (I-VT) voiced his support for the striking workers and a $15 an hour federal minimum wage at a Fight for $15 rally in Washington DC.

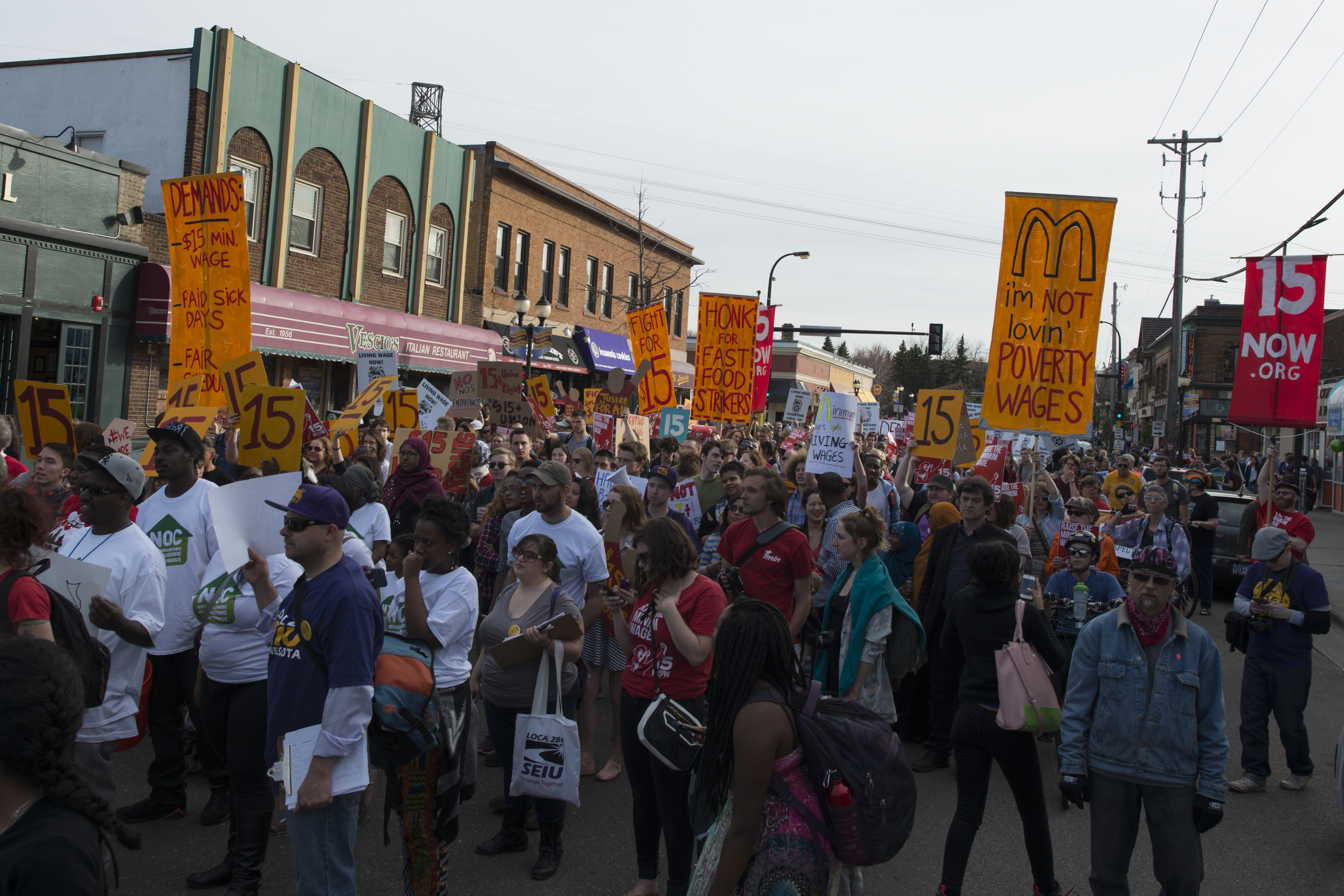
Strike and a protest march for a $15 minimum wage in Dinkytown, Minnesota.

== Global strikes and protests ==
On May 15, 2014, fast food workers in countries around the world, including Brazil, the United Kingdom, Japan, and the U.S., went on strike to protest low wages in fast food restaurants. The strikes took place in 230 cities as workers demanded a $15 minimum wage and the right to unionize without fear of retaliation. Less than a week later, a mass protest at McDonald's headquarters in Oak Brook, Illinois took place and resulted in over 100 protesters being arrested, including workers, church leaders and Service Employees International Union president Mary Kay Henry, and a partial shutdown of the McDonald's campus. According to the movement organizers, the protest took place in 30 cities in Japan, 5 cities in Brazil, 3 cities in India and 20 cities in Britain. The labor federation with over 12 million workers in 126 countries joined the protest to help propel the effort.

Industry officials say that only a small percentage of fast food jobs pay the minimum wage and that those are largely entry-level jobs for workers under 25. Backers of the movement for higher pay point to studies saying that the average age of fast food workers is 29 and that more than one-fourth are parents raising children. According to Mary Kay Henry, the president of Service Employees International Union, "fast food workers in many other parts of the world face the same corporate policy. Low pay, no guaranteed hours and no benefits". According to her, such unfairness in the wages exist due to the lack of opportunity for these workers to unionize. According to one of McDonald's workers, the minimum wages is not enough to take care of his children and their education. However, some analysts at conservative think tanks say that increasing the wages will have harmful consequences on the hiring rate, which could result in a large number of unemployed people.

Julie Sherry, an organizer of the protests in the United Kingdom, which took place on several occasions since January 2014, projected that 100 workers would meet at 4 pm London time at the McDonald's in Trafalgar Square. They planned to carry signs declaring, "Fast Food Rights" and "Hungry for Justice" and to chant, "Zero Hours, No Way" – a reference to contracts in the UK that an estimated 90% of McDonald's workers have signed that do not guarantee them any hours but expect workers to come in whenever they are called. Organizers say that in the Philippines, workers held a flash mob inside a Manila McDonald's, singing and dancing to "Let It Go", from the movie Frozen, urging McDonald's to "let go" of its low wages and allow workers to organize. Protesters in Brussels shut down a McDonald's at lunchtime, and protesters in Mumbai who were threatened with arrests by local police were undeterred. Japan saw protests in nearly every prefecture and showed solidarity with U.S. workers by calling on McDonald's to pay Japanese workers 1,500 yen.

This is not the first time that the workers protested against the low wages. On November 29, 2012, about 200 workers protested at a McDonald's at Madison Avenue and 40th Street chanting "Hey, hey, what do you say? We demand fair pay". According to Kate Bronfenbrenner, director of labor education research at the Cornell University School of Industrial and Labor Relations, the workers global campaign is not a new idea. This approach originated in the 1800s, when workers in Britain and India jointly protested the way the East India Company treated its Indian workers.

Some economists and labor activists are looking to the Danish socioeconomic model, with its powerful unions and living wages for fast food workers, as evidence that companies can adapt in nations that have high wage floors, and that such a model can serve as an example to the United States. According to John Schmitt of the Center for Economic and Policy Research: "We see from Denmark that it's possible to run a profitable fast-food business while paying workers these kinds of wages." Stephen J. Caldeira, President and CEO of the International Franchise Association, an organization that has many fast food companies as members, strongly disagrees and claims that "trying to compare the business and labor practices in Denmark and the U.S. is like comparing apples to autos."

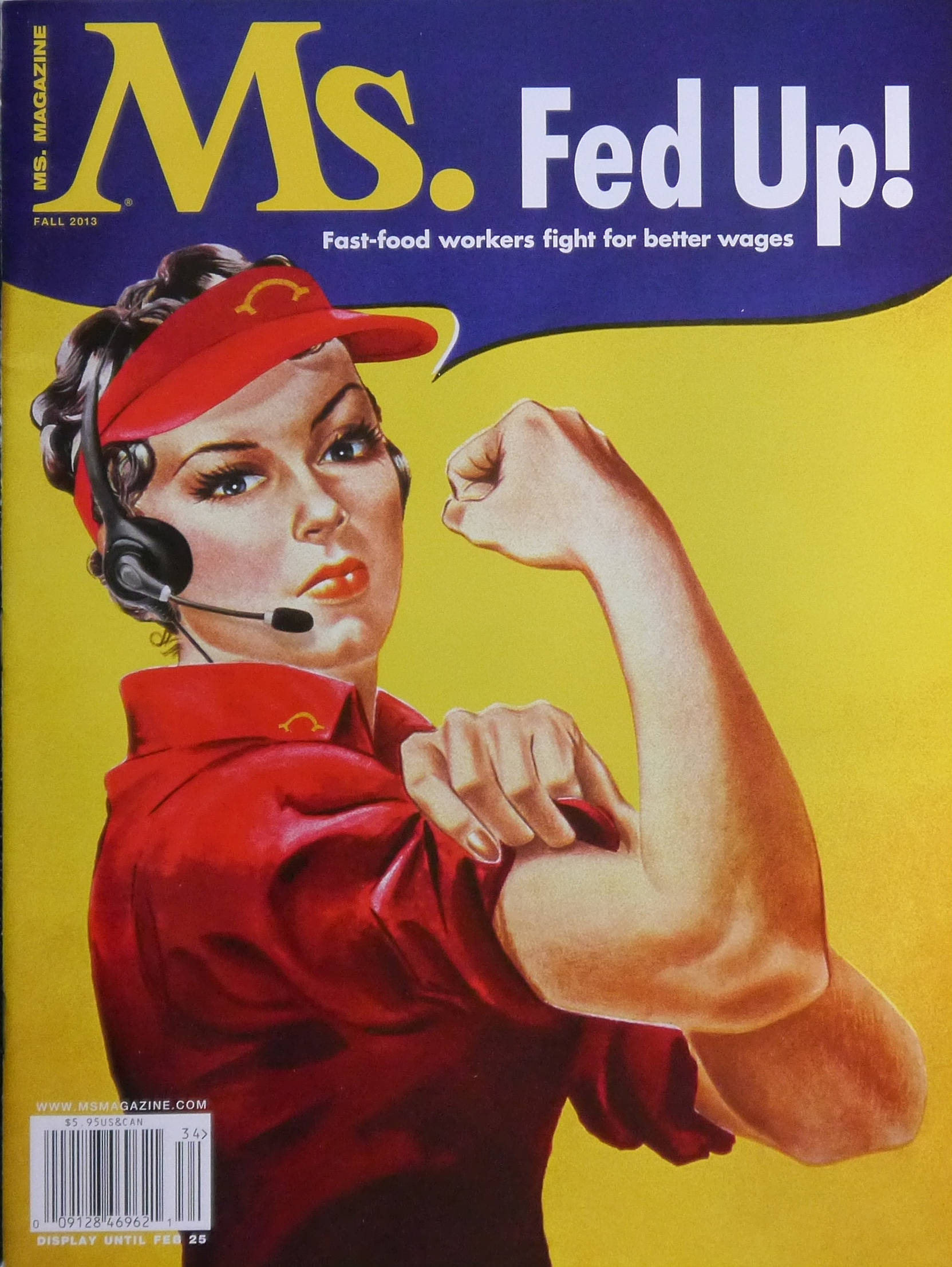
The fall 2013 issue of Ms. magazine about fast food worker wages

A January 2015 study by economists at the University of Massachusetts at Amherst found that fast food companies could absorb an incremental wage hike from $7.25 to $15 without shedding jobs by reducing turnover and slightly increasing prices. However, in Denmark the average number of employees per restaurants is lower than the United States and more jobs are replaced with automation.

== Affected industries ==
=== Restaurant industry ===
The impact on employers and workers within the restaurant industry is a major focus of the Fight for $15 movement. According to the U.S. Bureau of Labor Statistics, restaurants and other food services employ about sixty percent of all workers paid at or below the minimum wage as of 2018. Common responses to minimum wage increases include restaurant operators cutting employee hours and raising menu prices. In cities such as New York City and Seattle that have already implemented a $15 minimum wage for most businesses, menu price increases have been a trend. Politicians, economists, restaurant owners and workers continue to debate the economic viability and benefits of a federally mandated $15 minimum wage.

Economists of the Economic Policy Institute have largely come out in support of a $15 federal minimum wage. Their outlined plan entails a gradual increase, reaching $15 by 2024. Fast food restaurants are a key focus in the Fight for $15 movement. Some argue that turnover reductions, trend increases in sales growth, and modest annual price increases would allow for this bump in minimum wage without forcing the restaurants to shed employees. While most advocates acknowledge rising prices as a result of the higher wages, they generally accept this outcome and believe it will not have a major negative impact on dining/overall sales. Advocates for the movement also point to research that finds the average estimated employment effect of minimum wage increases to be very small.

A common argument against raising the minimum wage in restaurants to $15 is that it could cause cuts to employee hours, as well as potential layoffs or restaurant closures.

Waiters, bartenders, and other food service workers who primarily work for tips may use the federal tipped minimum wage, which is currently $2.13 an hour. A tip credit is the difference between their minimum wage and the cash wage an employee is paid during a pay period, accounting for tips that do not add up to the federal minimum wage. Many advocates for a $15 minimum wage, including restaurant owners, believe that restaurants should get rid of the tip credit pay structure, as they find it is not beneficial to low wage restaurant workers.

=== Retail ===
According to the U.S. Bureau of Labor Statistics, 11,302,000 workers in the retail industry were paid hourly rates at or below the federal minimum wage in 2018. Retail workers account for a significant portion of those affected by the minimum wage, as major retailers such as Target and Walmart are a big focus on this issue. Recently, some companies, including Target and Best Buy, have committed to boost their starting hourly wage to $15 an hour, regardless of local/federal minimum wage mandates. As pressure grows, more stores are increasing their hourly rates both to satisfy political/social demands, while also benefiting from happier, more productive workers.

=== Health care ===
Health care is one of the largest industries in the United States, with about 18.6 million workers as of 2019. According to The Brookings Institution, there were nearly 7 million people in low-paid health jobs in 2019 in the United States. The median wage was $13.48 an hour for jobs in health care support, service, and direct care. Given the discrepancy between wages in these categories and significantly higher pay for doctors and nurses, the fight for a living wage in health care has gained support.

== Criticism and responses ==
Arguments for and against the movement are the same as arguments for and against the minimum wage. Opponents generally claim that higher wages will result in fewer working hours for each worker (nullifying the increased rate), increased unemployment, and higher consumer prices. Proponents generally point to the benefits for workers who earn a higher hourly rate, and claim that the higher prices are tolerable and promote a more equitable distribution of wealth. Economists disagree whether higher minimum wages cause unemployment among low-wage workers. In 2017 and 2018, the unemployment rate was very low nationally, and several states hit record low unemployment levels, with no clear pattern across high-wage vs. low-wage states.

Former McDonald's CEO and President Ed Rensi cited the Fight for $15 movement as the reason for the installation of automated ordering kiosks at the chain's restaurants nationwide, which he says is an example of higher minimum wages causing unemployment. Increased automation is treated as a benefit of a higher minimum wage by some advocates, and economists generally view automation as a net positive because it increases labor productivity and allows employers to pay higher wages to workers because they are shifted to higher-value tasks.

Rensi and other critics say that some businesses, especially small businesses, cannot afford the capital investments needed for automation, or simply cannot afford higher labor costs. As a result, they are either driven out of business or relocate to lower-wage jurisdictions. Such cases are portrayed on the advocacy web site Faces of $15. Other businesses, including Amazon.com, have voluntarily pledged to pay workers no less than $15 per hour (though through Amazon Robotics the company is also investing heavily in automation). Observers say businesses do this to reduce turnover and training costs, to compete for quality workers in a tight labor market, and to avoid negative publicity.

Other critics claim that an increased minimum wage would accelerate the speed of automation and displacement of minimum wage jobs, as employers replace low-skilled workers with machines, AI, and self-driving vehicles in common job sectors: retail, fast food service, call centers, trucking, and accounting. Universal basic income has been proposed as another progressive alternative.

== Achievements ==
The minimum wage by US state and year

In the state of Washington, two cities have been described as test cases for the $15 minimum wage. In SeaTac, a small suburban community whose economy centers around the Seattle–Tacoma International Airport, the minimum wage was increased to $15 per hour in 2014 without any intermediate stages, which resulted in heavy media attention. In 2014, Seattle became the first major city in the US to raise the minimum wage to $15 per hour. The campaign was spearheaded by socialist city councilmember Kshama Sawant with support from a broad coalition of labor unions (under the leadership of state labor council president Jeff Johnson), faith groups, and other organizations. Seattle's minimum wage for large employers was raised to $15.45 in 2018 and $16 in 2019. Studies of Seattle's workforce have shown no decline in employment and tangible benefits for workers.

The Fight for $15 movement has succeeded in several states and cities in raising the minimum wage to $15 or more per hour. In California, the minimum wage has been raised in stages since 2016, starting from a rate of $10 per hour, and will reach $15 per hour in 2022. Several cities in California have already raised the minimum wage to $15 or more, including Berkeley, El Cerrito, Emeryville, Mountain View, San Francisco, San Jose, San Mateo, and Sunnyvale. Massachusetts passed the "Grand Bargain" law in 2018, which raises the state minimum wage to $15 per hour by 2023, after yearly increases from the $11/hour minimum reached in 2017. The state of New York will raise the minimum wage in the Downstate region to $15 per hour in 2021, while in Upstate New York the minimum wage will be set by the Commissioner of Labor no lower than $12.50 per hour. In New Jersey, the minimum wage will reach $15 per hour in 2024. In March 2019, both Maryland and Illinois have explicitly passed laws or statutes on the process of "gradually increases over several years" raising their state minimum wage to at least $15 per hour. In May 2019, Connecticut passed a $15 per hour law. On November 3, 2020, 61% of Florida voters passed Amendment 2, which raises the minimum wage to $10.00 per hour effective September 30, 2021, and then increases it annually by $1.00 per hour until the minimum wage reaches $15.00 per hour in 2026 and then reverts to being adjusted annually for inflation. In 2022, Hawaii passed a law to raise the minimum wage to $18 per hour by 2028 at a rate of $2 every two years, and 59% of Nebraska voters passed Initiative 433, which raises the minimum wage to $15 per hour by 2026 at a rate of $1.50 a year. Alaska and Missouri passed ballot measures in 2024. Michigan's minimum wage will be $15 per hour in 2027 as part of a bipartisan compromise passed in 2025.

When the New York State Wage Board announced that the minimum wage in New York City would be raised to $15 an hour by December 31, 2018, Patrick McGeehan argued in The New York Times that it was a direct consequence of the Fight for $15 protests, and that "the labor protest movement that fast-food workers in New York City began nearly three years ago has led to higher wages for workers all across the country."

A $15/hour minimum wage at Amazon took effect in November 2018.

It is estimated that as a result of state and local minimum wage laws adopted since the Fight $15 began, an estimated 26 million workers have won $151 billion in raises.

=== Exceptions ===
State and local governments which have raised their minimum wage to $15 per hour have often included exceptions, allowing certain types of employers to pay less or for certain types of employees to receive less. This is typically done with the intent of minimizing any potential negative impacts on the economy.

Employers and industries with labor unions are sometimes exempted from paying their employees the full minimum wage, to encourage the growth of organized labor. As of December 2014, unions were exempt from recent minimum wage increases in Chicago, SeaTac, Washington, and Milwaukee County, Wisconsin, as well as the California cities of Los Angeles, Long Beach, San Jose, Richmond, and Oakland. In San Francisco, a labor union may be exempt if its collective bargaining agreement explicitly waives the minimum wage requirement.

In New Jersey, where the general minimum wage is set to be raised to $15 per hour in 2024, farmworkers are excluded and their minimum wage will be set at $12.50.

== Estimated economic impact of federal $15 wage ==
In February 2021, the Congressional Budget Office released a report on the Raise the Wage Act of 2021 which estimated that incrementally raising the federal minimum wage to $15 an hour by 2025 would benefit 17 million workers, but would also reduce employment by 1.4 million people. It would also lift 0.9 million people out of poverty, possibly raise wages for an additional 10 million workers, and increase the federal budget deficit by $54 billion over ten years by increasing the cost of goods and services paid for by the federal government. It would also cause prices to rise, and overall economic output to decrease slightly over the next 10 years.

A few economists have disputed some of the report's findings. University of California, Berkeley's Michael Reich has estimated that rather than increasing the deficit, a $15 minimum wage could increase federal tax revenue by $65 billion annually, because of increased payroll taxes and government spending on safety net programs is likely to decrease. Arindrajit Dube stated that he thought the report's examination of relevant studies was not as comprehensive as a report he recently did and estimated that the job losses would be less than 500,000.

== See also ==
- List of countries by minimum wage
- Income inequality in the United States
- Justice for Workers (Canadian movement)
- Labor history of the United States
- One Fair Wage
- Poverty in the United States
- McDonald's and unions
