= Making Ontario Open for Business Act, 2018 =

Ontario, Canada statute

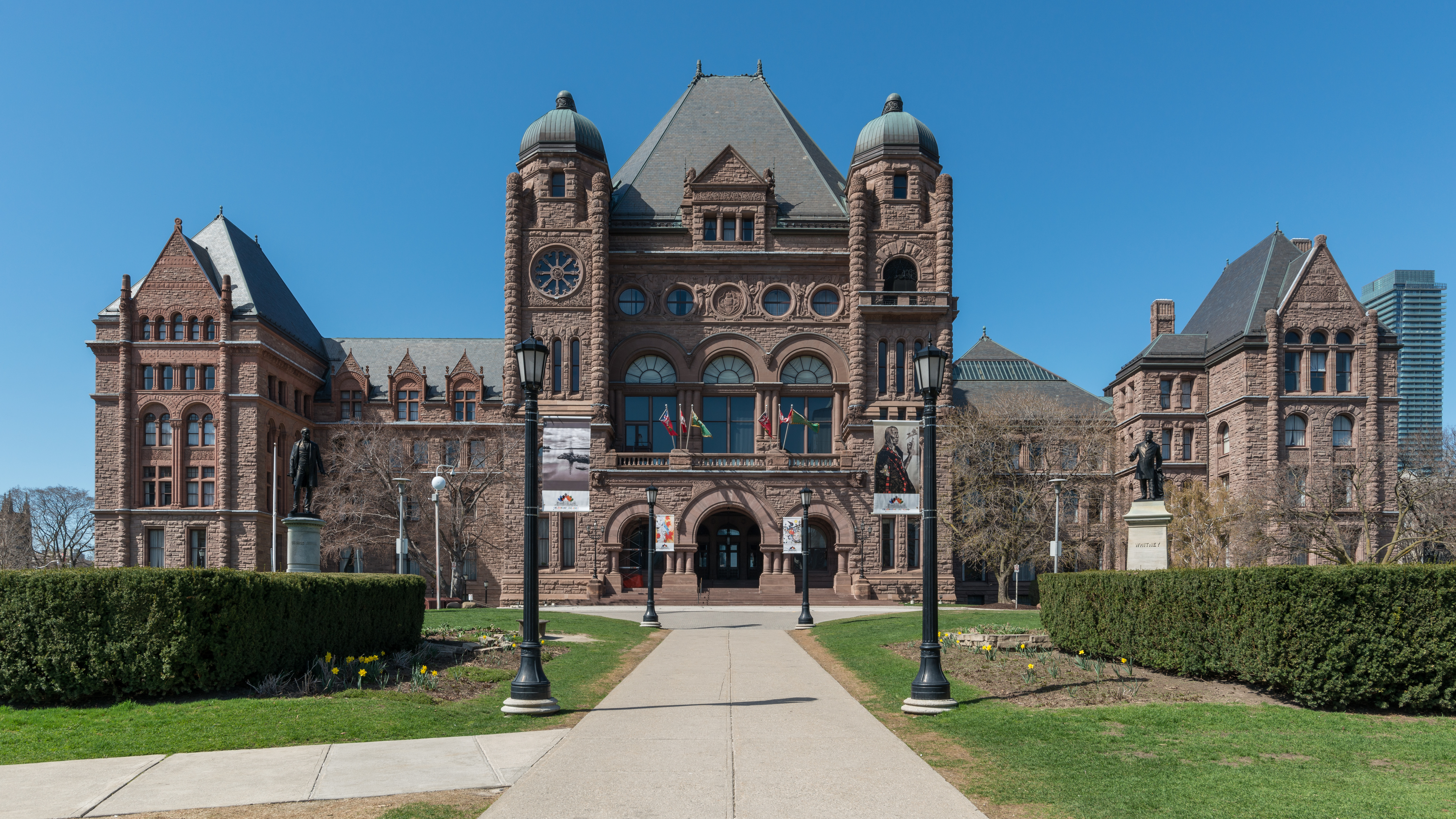

Legislative Assembly of Ontario
- Long title: An Act to amend the Employment Standards Act, 2000, the Labour Relations Act, 1995 and the Ontario College of Trades and Apprenticeship Act, 2009 and make complementary amendments to other Acts (Bill 47, 2018)
- Territorial extent: Ontario
- Enacted by: Legislative Assembly of Ontario
- Royal assent: 21 November 2018

Legislative history
- Introduced by: Todd Smith
- First reading: 23 October 2018
- Second reading: 12 November 2018
- Third reading: 21 November 2018

The Making Ontario Open for Business Act (Bill 47, 2018; French: Loi de 2018 pour un Ontario ouvert aux affaires) is a law in the province of Ontario that froze the minimum wage in the province and removing a number of protections of workers' rights.

== Summary ==
The bill contained three schedules: Schedule 1 making a number of changes to the Employment Standards Act, 2000, Schedule 2 to the Labour Relations Act, 1995, and Schedule 3 to the Ontario College of Trades and Apprenticeship Act, 2009. The bill additionally repealed many of the provisions of the Fair Workplaces, Better Jobs Act, 2017.

Among the changes brought by Schedule 1 were:

- Freezing the minimum wage in Ontario at $14,00, thus eliminating the planned increased in 2019
- Indexing the minimum wage to inflation, beginning in October 2020
- Eliminating personal emergency leave and replacing it with separate leave provisions for unpaid sick leave, family responsibility leave, and bereavement leave
- Decreasing the penalties for contraventions of the Employment Standards Act
- Eliminating the requirement of equal pay for equal work
- Eliminating the reverse onus requiring the employer to prove that an individual is not an employee in disputes over whether the individual is an employee or not

Among the changes brought by Schedule 2 were:

- Eliminating the ability of trade unions to obtain a list of employees
- Eliminating the ability of parties to request educational support in the practice of labour relations and collective bargaining
- Eliminating the right of employees to have their rate of pay reviewed by employers
- Replacing collective agreement mediation with arbitration as the first resort during collective bargaining disputes
- Decreasing the penalties for contraventions of the Labour Relations Act

== Legislative history ==
The bill was introduced to the Legislative Assembly of Ontario by Progressive Conservative MPP for Bay of Quinte and Ministry of Economic Development, Job Creation and Trade Todd Smith in late October 2018.

From 12 November to 20 November 2018, the bill was reviewed by the Standing Committee on Finance and Economic Affairs.

On 21 November 2018, the final vote on the bill was held, with 69 MPPs voting in favour and 45 voting against. It received royal assent from Lieutenant-Governor Elizabeth Dowdeswell that same day.

== Reactions ==
The Ontario Chamber of commerce supported the bill, stating that it was "a bold step in creating a stronger and more prosperous province." Premier Doug Ford defended the bill, stating that the Fair Workplaces, Better Jobs Act, 2017 "was the worst job-killing bill. It was the worst bill for people, the most vulnerable people in society to get a hand up."

The bill was opposed by several trade unions in the province. The Elementary Teachers' Federation of Ontario stated that "Ontario's economy is not going to grow when 40 per cent of working people do not have disposable income to fuel the economy nor the stability to feed their families," while the Ontario Federation of Labour stated Ford "has proven he's an enemy of workers." On 26 October 2018, a protest was organised by unions against the bill outside the Ministry of Labour. A further protest was held in late-November, resulting in several protestors being handcuffed and escorted out of the Queen’s Park gallery.

Concerns were also raised by public health groups concerning the impact the elimination of paid sick days would have. Minister of Health Christine Elliott stated that her ministry had not been consulted about the bill. Those concerns were raised again during the COVID-19 pandemic in Ontario in 2020.

A Campaign Research opinion poll released on 13 November 2018 found that 77% of those polled opposed the elimination of paid sick days and that 52% opposed the freezing of the minimum wage.
