= South Lake Union Streetcar =

Streetcar line in Seattle, Washington

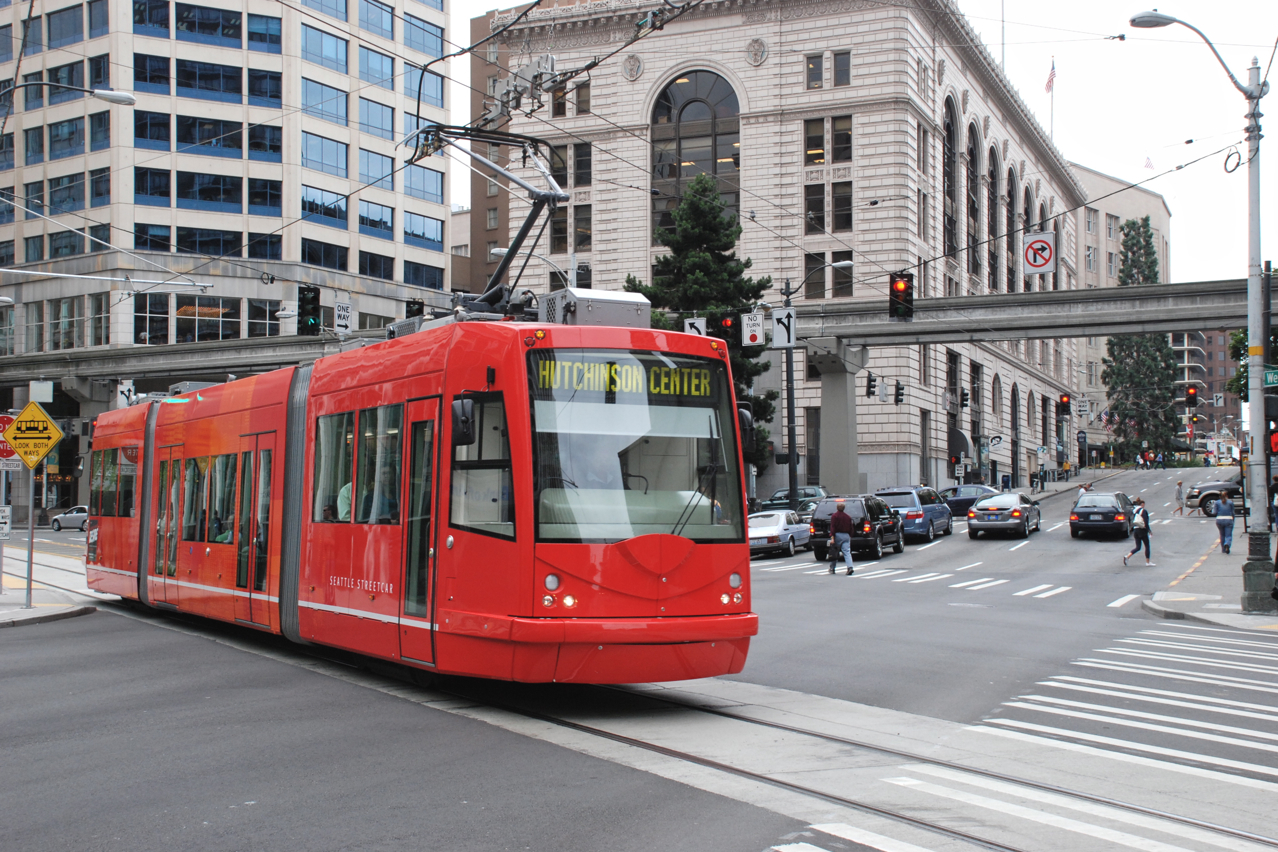
- A streetcar departing the McGraw Square terminal

Overview
- Status: Operational
- Owner: City of Seattle
- Line number: 98 (used internally)
- Termini: South Lake Union; Westlake Center, Downtown Seattle
- Stations: 11
- Website: South Lake Union Streetcar

Service
- Type: Streetcar
- System: Seattle Streetcar
- Operator(s): King County Metro
- Rolling stock: 3 Inekon Type 12 Trio vehicles 1 Inekon Type 121 Trio
- Ridership: 222,592 (2024)

History
- Opened: December 12, 2007

Technical
- Line length: 1.3 mi (2.1 km)
- Track length: 2.6 mi (4.2 km)
- Number of tracks: 2
- Character: At grade, in mixed traffic
- Track gauge: 4 ft 8 1/2 in (1,435 mm) standard gauge
- Electrification: Overhead line, 750 V DC

The South Lake Union Streetcar, officially the South Lake Union Line, is a streetcar route in Seattle, Washington, United States, forming part of the Seattle Streetcar system. It travels 1.3 miles (2.1 km) and connects Downtown Seattle to the South Lake Union neighborhood on Westlake Avenue, Terry Avenue, and Valley Street. The South Lake Union Streetcar was the first modern line to operate in Seattle, beginning service on December 12, 2007, two years after a separate heritage streetcar ceased operations.

The streetcar line was conceived as part of the redevelopment of South Lake Union into a technology hub, with lobbying and financial support from Paul Allen and his venture capital firm Vulcan Inc. The $56 million project was funded using a combination of contributions from local property owners, the city government, and grants from the state and federal government. Construction began in July 2006 and was completed over a year later by the Seattle Department of Transportation. The line is owned by the City of Seattle, with operation and maintenance contracted out to King County Metro.

The line is popularly known by its nickname, the South Lake Union Trolley (abbreviated as "SLUT"), which is used on unofficial merchandise sold by local businesses. The streetcar was controversial in its first few years due to its slow speed, low ridership, public funding, and connections to real estate development. Improvements to the streetcar's corridor since 2011 have increased service and improved schedule reliability, but ridership has declined since peaking in 2013. A planned streetcar project to connect the South Lake Union Line with the First Hill Line via Downtown Seattle was placed on hold by the city government in 2018.

== History ==
=== Earlier streetcars and planning ===
The first electric streetcar to run along Westlake Avenue was operated by the Seattle Electric Railway and Power Company and opened five days after the company was awarded the city government's first streetcar franchise in October 1890. The Westlake streetcar line continued north from Downtown Seattle to the Fremont Bridge and was privately operated until being acquired by the city during the formation of the Seattle Municipal Street Railway in 1918. The streetcar system was gradually replaced with buses and the Westlake Avenue line ended service on April 13, 1941. Streetcar service in Seattle resumed in 1982 with the opening of the Waterfront Streetcar line along Alaskan Way, but the heritage streetcar ceased operations in 2005.

Restoration of streetcar service within the city was proposed in the 1990s to complement the planned light rail network put forward by Sound Transit and a proposed municipal monorail system. One streetcar proposal from Mayor Paul Schell in 1998 included re-routing a surface light rail line between downtown and the University District to serve the Seattle Center and South Lake Union, at the time a low-rise industrial area. The neighborhood had previously been proposed for redevelopment into a technology hub as part of the Seattle Commons plan, which was supported by Microsoft co-founder Paul Allen and civic leaders. After the Seattle Commons plan was rejected by voters in a set of referendums in 1995 and 1996, Allen's venture capital holding company Vulcan Inc. acquired waterfront properties in the South Lake Union area with plans to create a new commercial neighborhood.

Allen and Vulcan Inc. envisioned a streetcar on Westlake Avenue to link the redeveloped neighborhood to Downtown Seattle, similar to the Portland Streetcar's role in the revitalized Pearl District. The city government also studied the use of a streetcar and other modes on several major transit corridors, including Westlake Avenue. The $45 million streetcar project gained the support of Mayor Greg Nickels, but its cost was criticized by members of the Seattle City Council and political activists who saw other unfunded transportation needs, including street maintenance and bus improvements. The proposed 2.5-mile (4.0 km) streetcar would travel from the Fred Hutchinson Cancer Research Center to the Westlake Center, where it would connect to the Seattle Center Monorail, buses, and light rail trains. The city council approved a redevelopment plan for South Lake Union to accommodate biotechnology and biomedical research in June 2003, but chose to defer the streetcar issue until funding sources were identified and approved.

=== Approval and construction ===
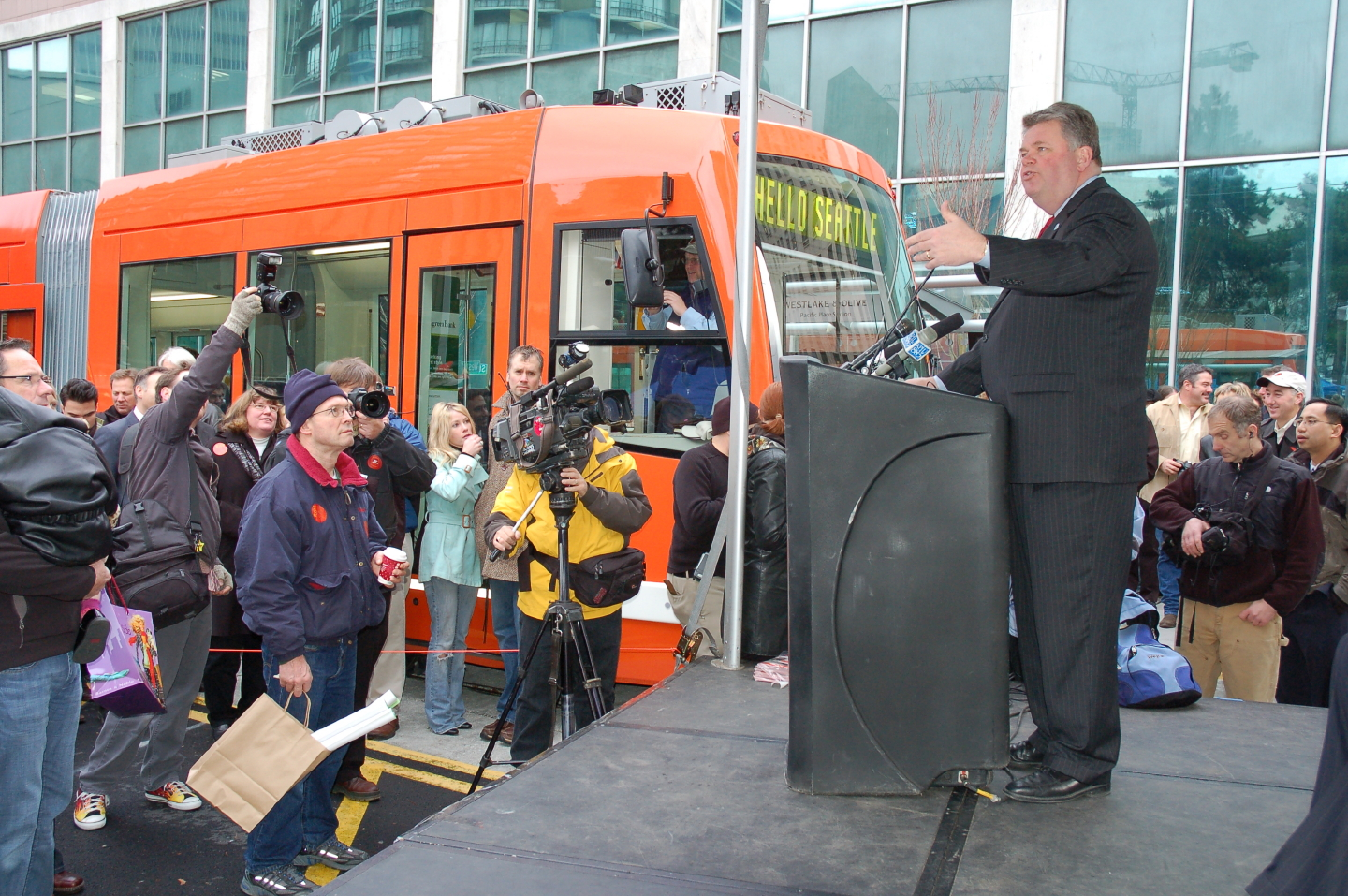
Mayor Greg Nickels speaking at the inauguration of the South Lake Union Streetcar, December 12, 2007

Vulcan and several businesses along the proposed streetcar route offered to pay $25 million towards the construction cost using a local improvement district levy, while the remainder would be funded by the city. The city council released $2.4 million in state and federal funds for the project's design and engineering work in April 2004; this was increased by an additional $4.3 million by the Puget Sound Regional Council. Mayor Nickels proposed a financing plan for the streetcar project in April 2005, using federal grants, the selling of naming rights at stations, land sales, and redirected transit operating funds to pay the $47.5 million cost. A consulting plan projected that the streetcar line would carry 350,000 passengers annually when it began operations in 2007 and double its ridership by 2016. Despite a city council analysis of the plan finding it to have funding risks and overstated promised ridership, the streetcar project was endorsed by the transportation committee and sent to the full council for a final vote. The city council voted 7–2 to approve the financing plan on June 27, 2005, allowing for contributions from the general fund to pay for the city's share of streetcar costs.

The formation of a local improvement district to contribute $25.7 million of the project's costs was approved by the city council in October 2005, despite some property owners opposing due to higher-than-expected assessments. Of the 750 affected property owners, 12 filed a formal protest to the local improvement district during the month-long protest period; several property owners also discussed a potential lawsuit to halt construction, while others were skeptical of large landowners who benefited from reduced assessments before the vote. The streetcar project remained controversial due to forwarded information given to Vulcan and its pro-streetcar lobbying group, as well as the use of public money to subsidize a billionaire's project. The city council gave its final approval to the streetcar project and its $50 million cost in March 2006, pledging public money that would cover all but $2.8 million of the construction costs.

Construction on the South Lake Union streetcar began with a groundbreaking ceremony on July 7, 2006, during which Mayor Nickels, U.S. Senator Patty Murray, State Representative Ed Murray, and county council chair Larry Phillips laid the first rails for the line. Track construction was completed on the Terry Avenue and Fairview Avenue sections first before moving on to Westlake Avenue between Denny Way and Valley Street; construction reached its halfway point in June 2007 and moved to Valley Street and further down the Westlake Avenue corridor. Westlake Avenue was originally a northbound-only street until September 2007, but was converted to two-way traffic for the streetcar; in October, Terry Avenue was converted from two-way traffic to become northbound-only. The Czech-built Inekon streetcars began arriving in September 2007 and street testing began at the end of the following month.

The streetcar line is officially named the South Lake Union Streetcar, but it is also known by a popular moniker – the South Lake Union Trolley (abbreviated as "SLUT"), which is used on merchandise sold by local businesses. The use of the alternate moniker as an official name is an urban legend that has persisted in the years since the line opened. The original creators of the "Ride the S.L.U.T." T-shirts explained that their use of the moniker was a protest against the declining use of Cascade in favor of South Lake Union; at the streetcar's opening, Mayor Nickels referred to the nickname by saying "I don't care what you call it, as long as you ride it."

=== Opening and later improvements ===
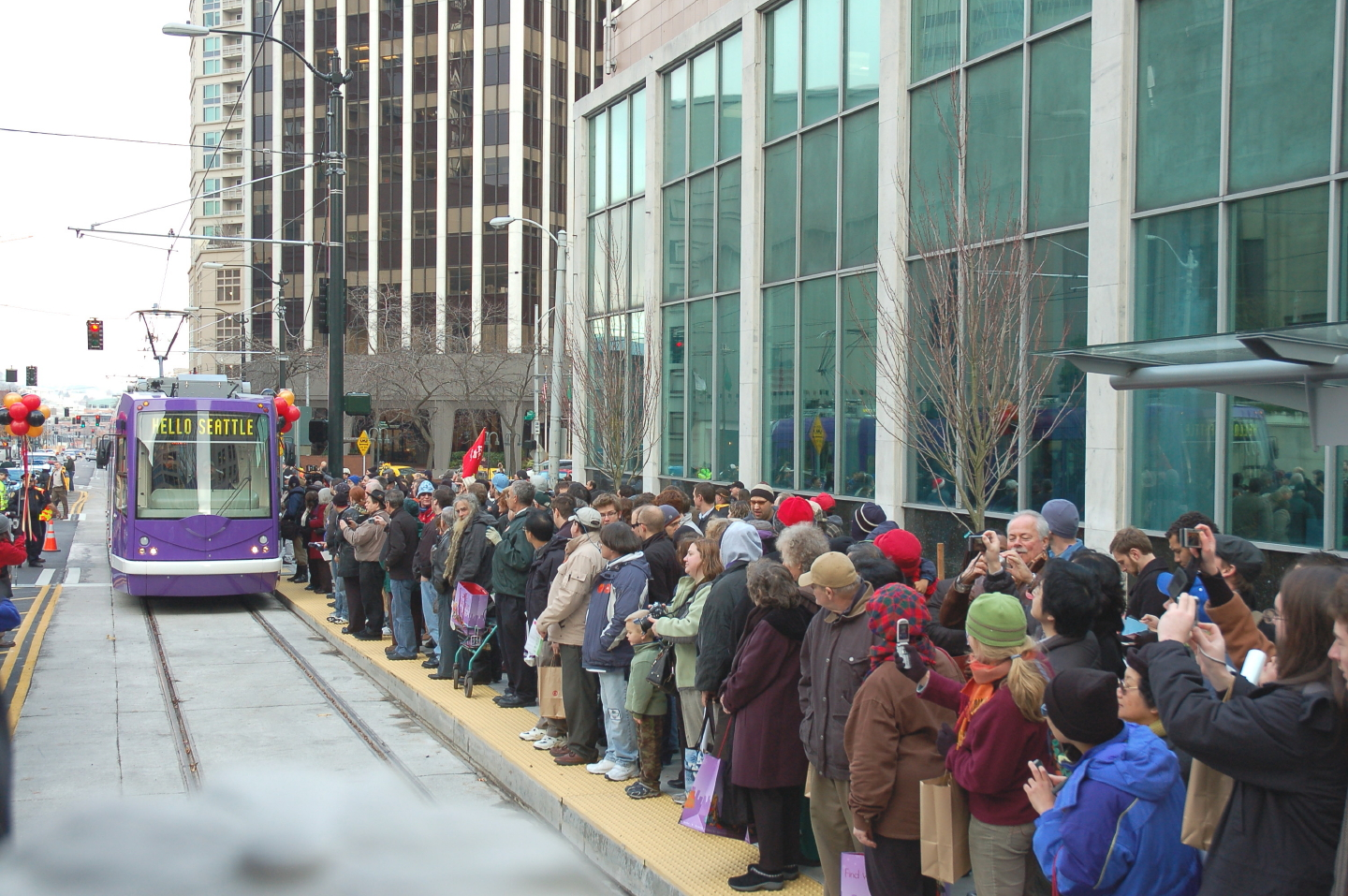
Opening day at McGraw Square, the southern terminus, on December 12, 2007

Streetcar service between the Pacific Place shopping center, South Lake Union, and the Fred Hutchinson Cancer Research Center began on December 12, 2007, with 600 people at the ribbon-cutting ceremony and each train carrying a hundred people throughout the day. Rides were free through the end of the month and a $1.50 adult fare was introduced in January 2008; the streetcar carried an average of 3,900 passengers per day by late December. The final cost to construct the streetcar was $56.4 million, with the overrun blamed on additional utility work after the line opening. The local improvement district contributed $25.7 million to its cost (including $8.6 million from Vulcan), while federal grants paid for $14.6 million, state grants contributed $3 million, and proceeds from land sales and property exchanges with Vulcan yielded $5.3 million. Operating funds for the streetcar cost $2 million and had to be covered by further loans in 2007 and 2009 due to low advertising revenue and higher costs.

The streetcar was criticized for its slow speeds due to the lack of dedicated lanes and widespread transit signal priority, as well as disruptions because of cars that were improperly parked adjacent to the track. A transit priority intersection at Mercer Street was removed in 2009 during the street's reconstruction, which added several minutes to scheduled travel times. The streetcar tracks were also identified as a hazard for cyclists riding on Westlake Avenue or intersecting streets, causing crashes and injuries within the first year of operation. A group of six cyclists sued the city government in 2011 over the streetcar hazard, but the case was dismissed by the King County Superior Court due to a lack of evidence of fault. High-rise development in South Lake Union opened alongside the streetcar, including offices to accommodate the then-upcoming relocation of Amazon, new condominiums, businesses, and retailers. Public opinion of the streetcar grew unfavorable in its first years of operation, in part because of its low ridership; all but one of the candidates in the 2009 city council and mayoral elections stated that the streetcar was a bad idea when asked during a public debate. By 2010, streetcar ridership had reached 500,000 annual boardings and was continuing to increase.

Streetcar ridership rose in later years due to an increase in new businesses around South Lake Union, necessitating new service improvements. In May 2011, Amazon, the Fred Hutchinson Cancer Research Center, UW Medicine, and Group Health contributed $65,000 to the city government to fund a one-year pilot to use the line's spare streetcar during rush hours to increase frequency to 10 minutes. Amazon announced plans in 2012 to build a new high-rise headquarters campus in Denny Triangle near the streetcar line and offered to purchase a fourth streetcar and fund its operations for ten years at a cost of $3.7 million, allowing trains to arrive every 10 minutes during midday hours on weekdays. The streetcar, painted in Amazon's corporate orange, arrived as part of the First Hill fleet in early 2015 and entered service later that year.

Increased traffic on Westlake Avenue and a decline in streetcar reliability by 2015 prompted the Seattle Department of Transportation to propose the installation of transit-only lanes along the street, which would be paired with increased bus service. The new lanes were added to improve reliability and headways for the streetcar and required the temporary suspension of mid-day service for several weeks in early 2016. The new lanes took effect on March 21, 2016; a service change went into effect five days later to increase streetcar frequency to 10 minutes, add bus service on Route 40, and reroute the RapidRide C Line to terminate in South Lake Union. Similar lane restrictions on two blocks of Terry Avenue during rush hours went into effect in November 2018 and are planned to be extended south by another block in 2020.

=== Service reductions and closures ===
On March 23, 2020, the streetcar was shut down as part of large cuts to transit services amid the local outbreak of the COVID-19 pandemic. Service resumed on September 19 with reduced frequencies and hours of operations in the evenings. A week-long closure is scheduled for September 2023 to allow for accessibility work on sidewalks and transit stops along the route. Service was reduced in July 2024 after King County Metro discovered issues with circuit breakers at one of two substations; the streetcar's service was suspended indefinitely after a power outage at the other substation on August 9. Replacement control units for the circuit breakers were expected to take "several weeks" to acquire and install. The streetcar resumed full service on September 4.

In November 2024, city councilmember Rob Saka proposed the full suspension of service on the South Lake Union Streetcar beginning in late 2025 to save $4.4 million in annual operating costs. Saka cited the line's low ridership and redundancy with existing bus routes on Westlake Avenue; he also supported an amendment from councilmember Bob Kettle to remove a study of the Culture Connector from the city budget. The proposal was met with criticism from the Downtown Seattle Association and was rejected by the city council's select budget committee. Plans for a light rail station near Denny Way on the Ballard Link Extension include a scheduled closure of a section of Westlake Avenue for up to eight years for construction. During this time, the streetcar is planned to be shut down or truncated.

=== Expansion proposals ===
The Seattle Streetcar network, as built and planned in 2019:
'"`UNIQ--templatestyles-0000010D-QINU`"' South Lake Union Streetcar (opened in 2007)
'"`UNIQ--templatestyles-0000010E-QINU`"' First Hill Streetcar (opened in 2016)
'"`UNIQ--templatestyles-0000010F-QINU`"' Center City Connector (on hold)

City officials saw the South Lake Union line as the first in a network of streetcar routes extending north to the University District, west to the Seattle Center, and southeast to First Hill and International District. Preliminary plans for a network of five-line streetcar network were approved for further development by the city council in December 2008 without allocated funding to cover the $600 million cost. The network plan included branches of the South Lake Union line that traveled northwest to Ballard via Fremont, and northeast to the University District via Eastlake. The lines would feed into a trunk along the South Lake Union Streetcar that would connect to a line serving Downtown Seattle and the Seattle Center on either 1st Avenue or 4th and 5th avenues. The Eastlake project, including a compatible replacement for the Fairview Avenue North Bridge, was prioritized for the next streetcar study, but it was delayed by the city council in favor of using its funds for bus service.

The only addition to the network so far, the First Hill Line, began construction in 2012 and opened in January 2016 with funding from Sound Transit, as part of mitigation for the loss of a planned light rail station serving First Hill. The First Hill line generally runs south from Capitol Hill station to Yesler Terrace on Broadway and west on South Jackson Street to the International District and Pioneer Square. The two streetcar lines do not intersect and leave a gap across downtown Seattle that was planned to be filled by a later extension.

Planning of a third streetcar project to connect the South Lake Union and First Hill lines began in 2012 as part of a revival in streetcar studies under Mayor Mike McGinn. The project, named the Center City Connector, was approved in July 2014 by the city council and was planned to begin service on 1st Avenue by 2020; its $110 million cost would be primarily covered by a grant from the Federal Transit Administration (FTA). Under the approved plan, the 1.2-mile (1.9 km) streetcar route would use a set of transit-only lanes in the center of 1st Avenue, stopping at Pike Place Market, the Seattle Art Museum, and near Colman Dock; it would carry both the South Lake Union and First Hill lines, which would overlap for a frequency of five minutes and would have an estimated daily ridership of 20,000. The older fleet of Inekon streetcars would be incompatible with the First Hill line, requiring a replacement; the Seattle Department of Transportation planned to sell the retired cars to Portland for use on its streetcar system.

By late 2017, questions arose regarding the streetcar's ridership projections and increased cost of $177 million as it neared the start of construction. King County Metro was contracted to operate the route, but found the baseline operating budget to be too small to handle the expected staffing that it needed. Mayor Jenny Durkan ordered an independent review of the Center City Connector project's cost estimations and halted all ongoing construction on the line in March 2018. The independent review was delivered several months late and found issues with vehicle procurement, including exceeding the project's limits for vehicle weight and size. The review estimated that the project would cost $252 million to construct. The streetcar project remained suspended due to a $286 million funding shortfall, which would have needed to be resolved to open the extension by 2026. A downtown revitalization plan released by mayor Bruce Harrell in May 2023 included the streetcar connector, renamed the "Culture Connector", but no funds to build it. A report released in January 2024 estimated that the project would take seven years to construct and cost $410 million—a 43 percent increase from the 2018 estimate.

== Route ==
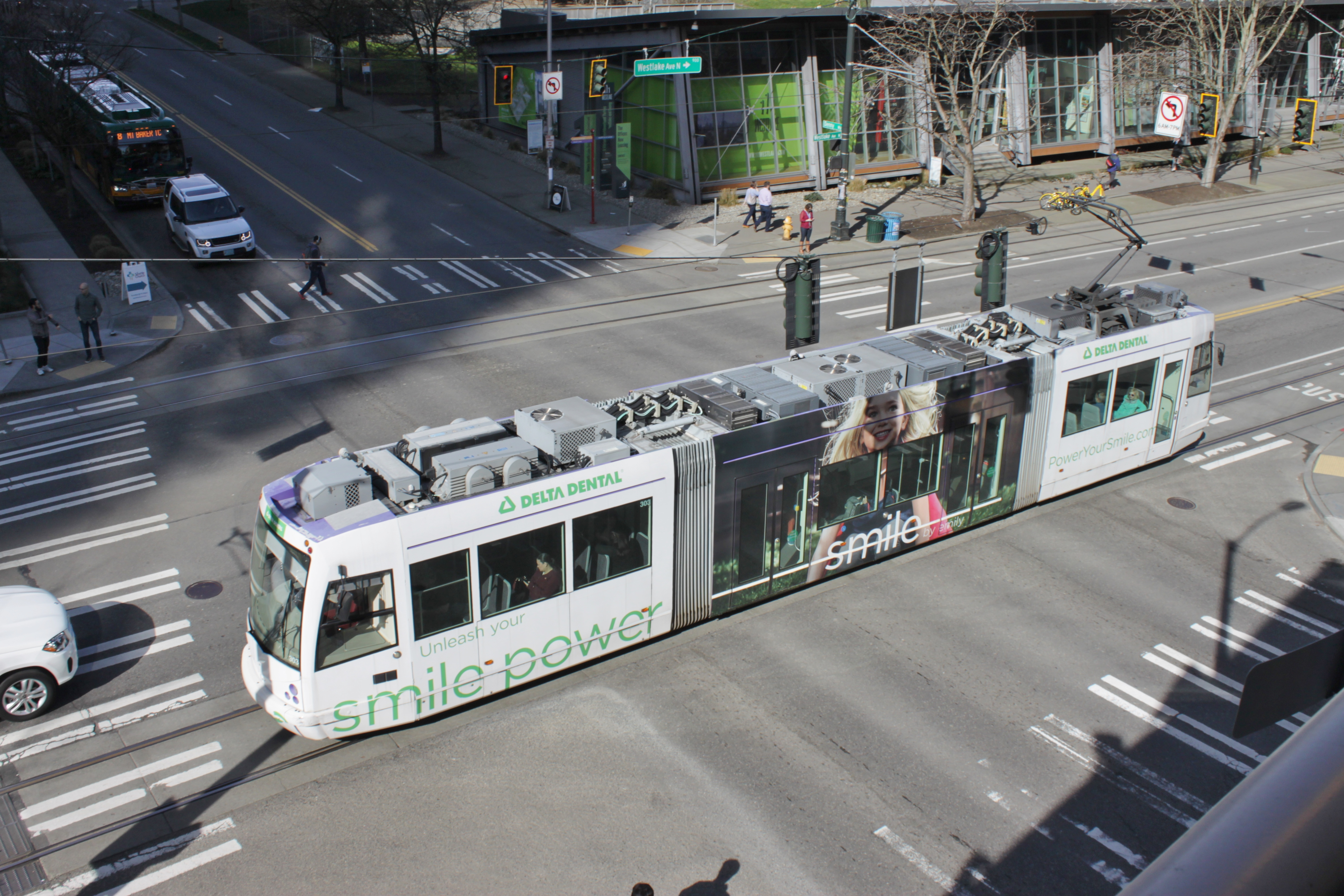
A northbound streetcar crossing Denny Way

The South Lake Union Line is 1.3 miles (2.1 km) long and connects Downtown Seattle to Denny Triangle and South Lake Union. Northbound trains begin at McGraw Square in Downtown Seattle, located next to the Westlake Center and Pacific Place. The terminal is also part of the Westlake transit hub, which includes the Seattle Center Monorail terminal at Westlake Center and the Westlake station in the Downtown Seattle Transit Tunnel for 1 Line trains. The dual-tracked line travels north via a set of curbside transit-only lanes on Westlake Avenue and stops at 7th Avenue to serve the Amazon headquarters campus (including the Amazon Spheres) and the U.S. Courthouse. The streetcar passes several high-rise office and residential buildings before reaching its next stop, located between 9th Avenue (Blanchard Street) and Denny Way just east of Denny Park.

The northbound track splits from Westlake Avenue at Thomas Street, running parallel one block to the east on Terry Avenue; a set of platforms between Thomas and Harrison streets serve the center of South Lake Union's office district. The northbound track is also connected to a spur track along Harrison Street that travels east to the line's operations and maintenance facility. After stopping between Mercer and Republican streets, the parallel streetcar tracks pass through the under-construction Google campus and rejoin on the north side of Valley Street, stopping at the entrance of Lake Union Park near the Museum of History & Industry and Center for Wooden Boats at a former naval armory. The tracks briefly travel east before turning northeast onto Fairview Avenue, traveling in the street's median for one block. It reaches the streetcar's northern terminus at Campus Drive on the Fred Hutchinson Cancer Research Center campus, while a tail track continues north for a half-block to allow vehicles to switch tracks.

=== Stations ===
The streetcar has eleven stations that are equipped with a high platform, a basic shelter and windscreen, ticket vending machines, real-time arrivals information, and rider information. Some stations have corporate sponsorships that are listed on shelter signage and raise additional revenue for operations. The stations on Westlake Avenue are shared with RapidRide C Line and Route 40 buses.

The southern terminus at the Westlake Hub was renovated and expanded in 2011 to connect with McGraw Square, previously separated by a section of Westlake Avenue. The new plaza has two streetcar platforms, seating areas, a bicycle repair station, and food truck spaces.

List of South Lake Union Streetcar stations
Station		Neighborhood	Connections and notes
Northbound	Southbound	Neighborhood	Connections and notes
Westlake Hub (McGraw Square)		Downtown	Westlake station: 1 Line, Seattle Center Monorail; Serves Westlake Center and Pacific Place
Westlake Avenue & 7th Avenue	Westlake Avenue & Virginia Street	Denny Triangle	Serves Amazon campus, U.S. Courthouse
Westlake Avenue & Denny Way	Westlake Avenue & 9th Avenue	Denny Triangle	King County Metro: C Line, Route 8, Route 40; Serves Denny Park
Terry Avenue & Thomas Street	Westlake Avenue & Thomas Street	South Lake Union	Serves Amazon campus
Terry Avenue & Republican Street	Westlake Avenue & Mercer Street	South Lake Union	Serves University of Washington School of Medicine
Lake Union Park		South Lake Union	King County Metro: C Line, Route 40; Serves Lake Union Park, Museum of History & Industry, Center for Wooden Boats
Fairview Avenue & Campus Drive		Cascade	King County Metro: Route 70; Serves Fred Hutchinson Cancer Research Center

== Service and operations ==
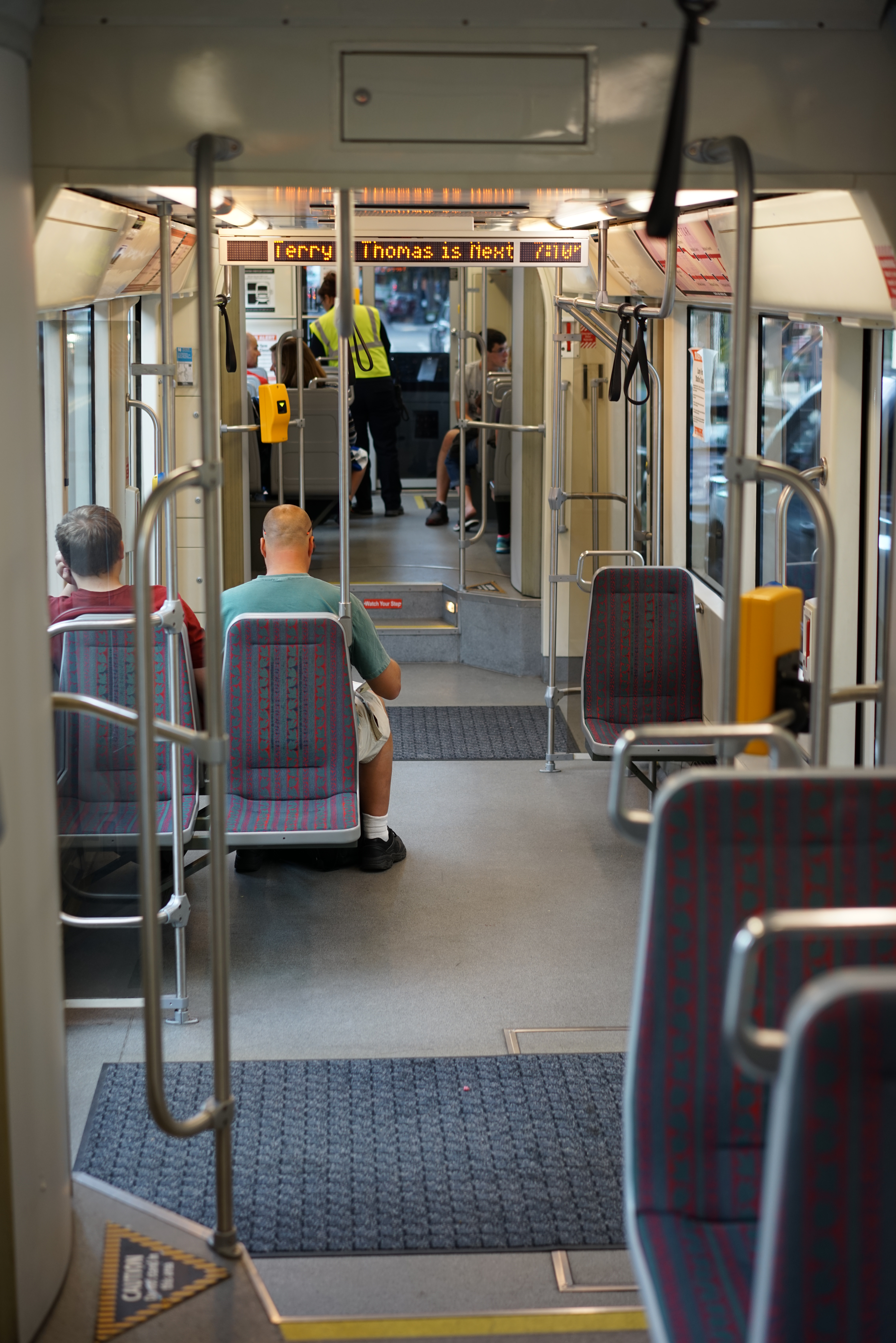
Interior of car 302, looking towards the central area

The South Lake Union Streetcar runs for 15 to 17 hours per day on weekdays and Saturdays, with trains from 6 a.m. to 9 p.m. from Monday to Thursday and 6 a.m. to 11 p.m. on Fridays and Saturdays, and nine hours per day on Sundays and holidays, from 10 a.m. to 7 p.m. The line has a frequency of 10 minutes during weekdays from 7 a.m. to 7 p.m. and 15 minutes at all other times. The streetcar does not operate on Thanksgiving and Christmas Day. The streetcar is occasionally disrupted or truncated on a temporary basis for events near the McGraw Square terminus, including state visits by political leaders at the Westin Seattle that require a security perimeter.

The streetcar is owned by the City of Seattle and is currently operated by King County Metro under a contract with the city government. The line's annual operating budget of $4.6 million (in 2024) is covered by a contribution from the King County government, an appropriation from the Federal Transit Administration, sponsorships, and the city's general fund. The county's contribution is meant to fund 75 percent of operating costs and was enacted in 2009 after the start of Link light rail service. King County Metro refers to the line using the internal designation of Route 98.

=== Ridership ===
Ridership statistics
Year	Weekday average	Annual total
2008	1,300	414,200
2009	1,400	451,300
2010	1,800	520,800
2011	2,500	714,700
2012	2,500	750,300
2013	2,600	760,900
2014	2,200	707,700
2015	1,800	622,000
2016	1,900	518,249
2017	—N/a	535,288
2018	—N/a	513,523
2019	—N/a	503,374
2020	—N/a	89,414
2021	—N/a	107,145
2022	—N/a	180,211
2023	—N/a	236,121
2024	—N/a	222,592
Sources: APTA Ridership Reports, SDOT

Streetcar ridership began with a daily average of 950 passengers in early 2008, increasing to an average of 1,300 by the end of the year for a total of 413,000 passengers. Usage of the streetcar increased as development in South Lake Union progressed and large employers like Amazon moved to the area. Ridership increased by 15 percent from 2009 to 2010 and reached the half-million milestone; the line reached its highest-ever ridership levels in 2013, carrying a total of 760,900 passengers and averaging 2,600 on weekdays with peaks of over 3,000 during the summer months. Ridership has declined since 2014 to below 2,000 daily passengers, in part due to schedule unreliability and the introduction of increased bus service along the Westlake Avenue corridor in 2016. By 2021, daily ridership on the streetcar had declined to 300 passengers due to the effects of the COVID-19 pandemic. The South Lake Union line carried 222,592 total passengers in 2024 and ridership was estimated at 500 daily passengers.

=== Fares ===
Both streetcar lines charge a single-ride fare of $2.25 for adults and $1 for low-income passholders, seniors, and qualified disability card carriers; passengers under the age of 18 ride for free as part of a statewide transit program that began in 2022. Fares can be paid using the regional ORCA card, a smartphone pass, or paper tickets printed by ticket vending machines at stations, which accept paper cash, coins, and credit cards. The streetcar system also offers a day pass option that allows for unlimited rides within the service day. ORCA card readers were added to the streetcar in April 2014, to replace an honor system used by cardholders. The fare was last changed in March 2015, with a slight reduction to match bus and light rail fares. Fares are enforced with random checks by Metro personnel through a proof of payment system.

=== Rolling stock and maintenance ===
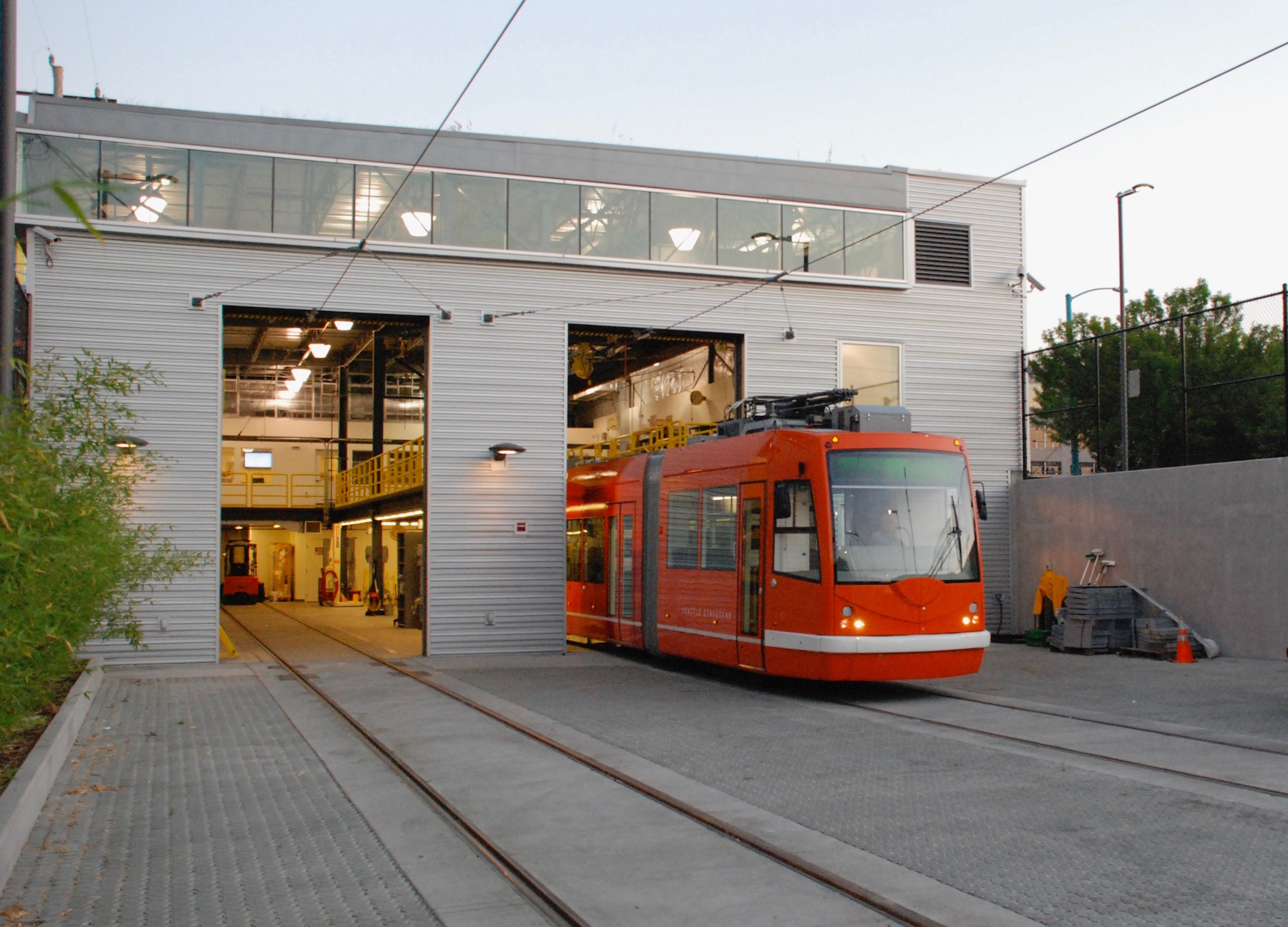
The South Lake Union Streetcar's maintenance facility, with car 302

The South Lake Union Streetcar uses four streetcars built by Inekon in the Czech Republic. The first three vehicles, numbered 301 to 303, were manufactured in 2007 and are based on the 12 Trio model. The vehicles were colored red, orange, and purple before being wrapped in advertisements. The fourth vehicle, numbered 407, is a Type 121 Trio that was manufactured in 2015 as part of the same fleet as the First Hill Line. The streetcars are 66 feet (20 m) long, weigh 66,000 pounds (30,000 kg), and have capacity for 140 passengers (30 seated, 110 standing). They are equipped with a mechanical bridge plate and ramp for wheelchairs that is deployed upon passenger request via a set of buttons. The first generation of vehicles lack bicycle racks, but bicycles are allowed on board.

The streetcar vehicles are stored and maintained at a facility on Harrison Street east of Fairview Avenue, which was constructed in 2006–07. The garage and storage tracks serve up to six vehicles and are connected to the streetcar line by a two-block spur track on Harrison Street. As part of the Center City Connector project, the operations and maintenance facility is planned to be expanded with a new building and set of storage tracks to accommodate up to ten vehicles. The city government received a proposal from a private real estate developer to build an office tower atop the new building as part of a $13 million lease agreement, which was deferred for later consideration.

== See also ==
- List of streetcar systems in the United States
- Streetcars in North America
