= Westlake Avenue =

Street in Seattle, Washington, United States

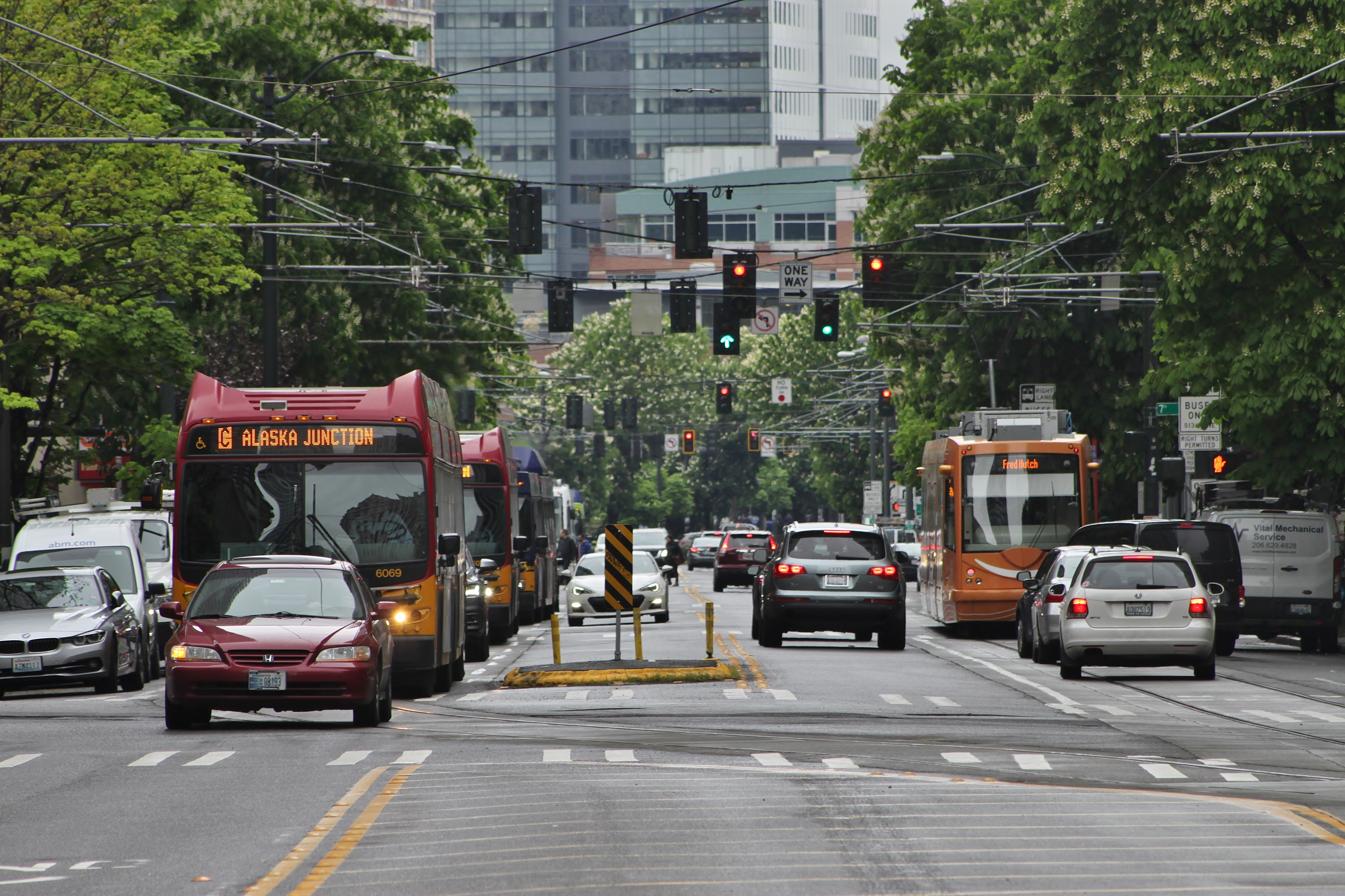
- Looking northbound from Virginia Street
- Type: Arterial street
- Maintained by: Seattle Department of Transportation
- Length: 2.5 mi (4.0 km)
- Location: Seattle, Washington
- South end: Stewart Street at McGraw Square
- Major junctions: Denny Way; Mercer Street
- North end: Fremont Avenue N / Dexter Avenue N / Nickerson Street

Construction
- Completion: 1906

Westlake Avenue is a major street in Seattle, Washington, connecting Downtown Seattle to the neighborhoods of South Lake Union, Westlake and northeastern Queen Anne. The street runs north–south along the west side of Lake Union for 2.5 miles (4.0 km) from McGraw Square to the Fremont Bridge.

The street's unusual route through the Denny Triangle follows a former railroad grade through a narrow valley between two hills that were regraded in the early 20th century. Westlake Boulevard was constructed through the valley in 1906, following the railroad and a streetcar line, and was later renamed to Westlake Avenue. The street was modified to run northbound-only from Denny Way to Mercer Street in the mid-20th century, and remained one-way until 2007.

Westlake Avenue is also served by a variety of public transit routes, including the South Lake Union Streetcar and RapidRide C Line. In 2016, a section of the street in South Lake Union received transit-only lanes in March 2016 and a cycletrack was installed along the west side of Lake Union. A Link light rail station is planned to be built at Westlake and Denny Way when a planned extension to Ballard is completed in 2035.

== Street description ==
Westlake Avenue begins at Stewart Street on the north side of McGraw Square, which also serves as the southern terminus of the South Lake Union Streetcar. The square is located adjacent to the Times Square Building and one block north of the Westlake Center and Nordstrom Building. The southernmost block of Westlake Avenue is divided between the streetcar tracks and a southbound-only street that connects to a porte-cochère for the Westin Seattle hotel complex. Westlake gains a northbound lane after crossing 6th Avenue and continues northwest across the Denny Triangle street grid, forming several triangular blocks.

The street passes the east side of the Amazon headquarters campus, including Doppler and the Amazon Spheres, and several high-rise residential buildings. A set of curbside transit-only lanes begin at Virginia Street and include several streetcar stops that are shared with buses. Westlake Avenue turns due north at an intersection with Denny Way, which marks the boundary of South Lake Union. The street continues north through the South Lake Union neighborhood, passing through an office and commercial district with several tech company offices. After crossing Mercer Street at the north end of the neighborhood, the transit-only lanes end and the streetcar's southbound track turns east onto Valley Street near the Allen Institute for Brain Science Building and Google campus.

Westlake Avenue turns northwest to follow the shore of Lake Union near Lake Union Park and the Museum of History and Industry. The east side of the street is used as a parking lot with a protected cycletrack and walking trail that runs along the side of the lake and its marinas. The street continues north through the Westlake neighborhood, parallel to Aurora and Dexter avenues to the west, and crosses under a pedestrian suspension bridge at Galer Street. Westlake gradually turns northwest along the side of a greenbelt and crosses under the Aurora Bridge before terminating at an intersection with Dexter Avenue, Nickerson Street, and Fremont Avenue on the south side of the Fremont Bridge. Nickerson travels west along the Lake Washington Ship Canal to the Seattle Pacific University campus in northern Queen Anne, while Fremont Avenue crosses the bridge into Fremont and continues north to Woodland Park Zoo.

== History ==
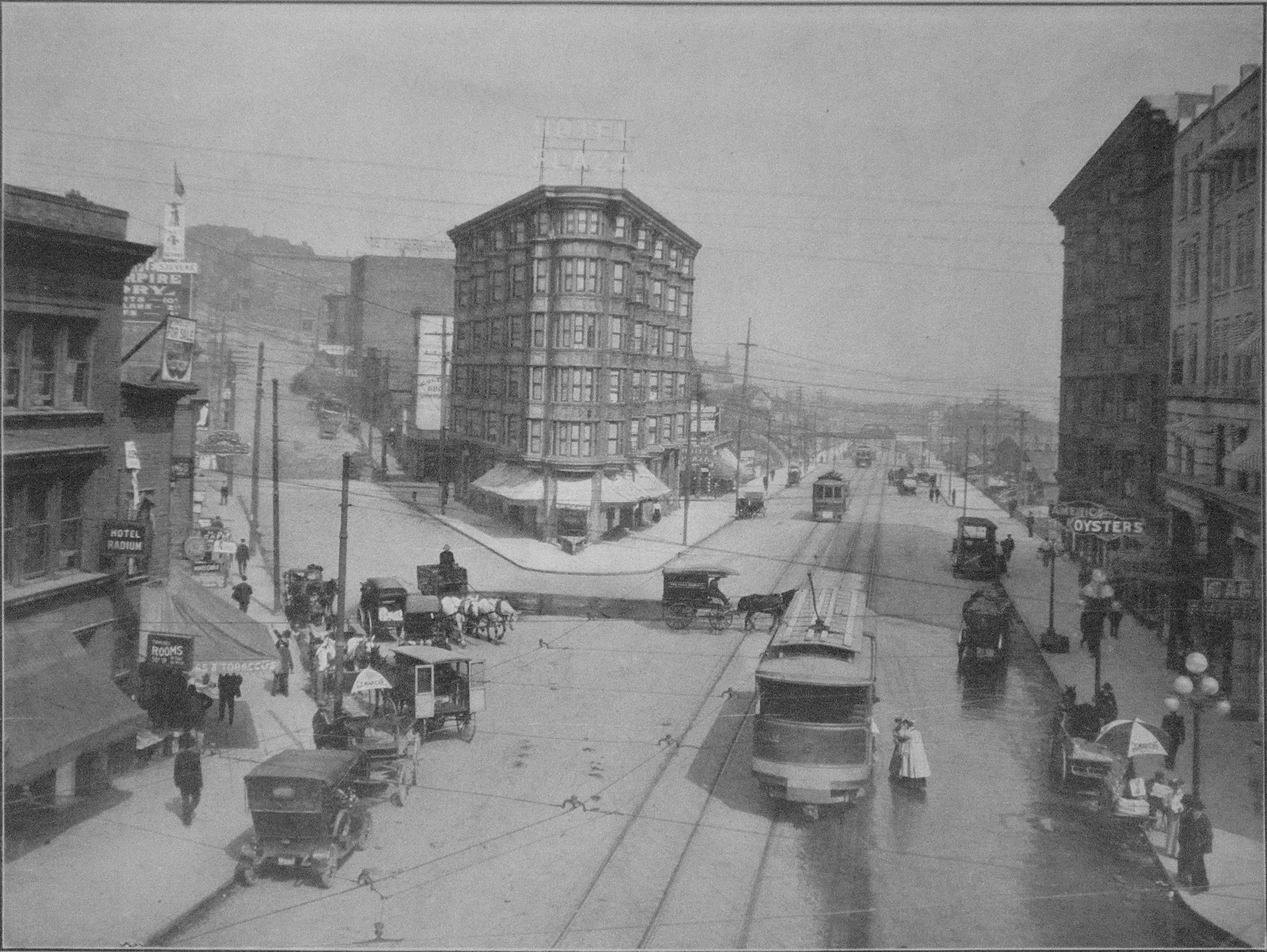
Looking at the intersection of Westlake Avenue and 4th Avenue in 1909

A military road was built along the west side of Lake Union in the early 1860s to connect the lake to the modern settlement of Seattle, following the general path of an older trail used by Native Americans. Lake Union became a landing point for coal shipments that were hauled by boat and wagon from modern-day Newcastle and Renton and were bound for ships on Elliott Bay. A narrow gauge railroad was constructed in 1872 through the valley on the east side of Denny Hill, following the modern-day route of Westlake Avenue. The railroad was abandoned five years later and replaced in 1890 with a streetcar line that was built in less than a week by the Seattle Electric Railway and Power Company. Between Depot Street (now Denny Way) and the southern shore of Lake Union, the streetcar followed Rollin Avenue.

The street was constructed in 1907 and completed in November of that year.

== Transit service ==
Westlake Avenue is served by the South Lake Union Streetcar, which began operating in 2007, and several bus routes run by King County Metro. Following the addition of transit-only lanes in March 2016, the RapidRide C Line and Metro Route 40 were moved onto the Westlake Avenue corridor. The C Line connects South Lake Union to West Seattle, while Route 40 continues north on Westlake from Downtown Seattle to Fremont, Ballard, and Northgate. In 2018, Amazon funded 22 additional weekday trips on Route 40 to relieve crowding and improve frequencies during rush hour.

Sound Transit plans to build two light rail stations in the general vicinity of Westlake Avenue in the Denny Triangle area. The Ballard Link Extension, planned to open in 2035, will include a station at the intersection of Westlake and Denny Way, along with an auxiliary South Lake Union station on Republican Street and an auxiliary Denny Triangle station on 6th Avenue near the current Westlake station.

== Cycling ==
The Westlake cycletrack, connecting Lake Union Park to the Fremont Bridge, opened in September 2016. The cycletrack project cost $3.6 million to construct and came after several years of public meetings and negotiations with business owners over the potential loss of public parking spaces. People for Bikes, a bicycle advocacy group, named the Westlake cycletrack the "best new bike lane" of 2016 for the United States. The southern reaches of Westlake have been criticized by cyclists due to the presence of streetcar tracks that pose a danger to thinner bicycle tires.

== Major intersections ==
The entire street is in Seattle, King County.

mi	km	Destinations	Notes
0.0	0.0	Stewart Street	Southbound access only
0.4	0.64	Denny Way	
0.8	1.3	Mercer Street	
2.5	4.0	Nickerson Street, Dexter Avenue N, Fremont Avenue N	Continues north on Fremont Bridge
1.000 mi = 1.609 km; 1.000 km = 0.621 mi: Incomplete access
