= Denny Way =

East-west street in Seattle, Washington, U.S.

Denny WAY
- Map of central Seattle with Denny Way highlighted in red
- Former name: Depot Street
- Namesake: David Denny
- Maintained by: Seattle Department of Transportation
- Length: 3.5 mi (5.6 km)
- Location: Seattle, Washington, U.S.
- West end: Western Avenue in Lower Queen Anne
- Major junctions: SR 99; I-5; Broadway; Madison Street
- East end: Madrona Place (38th Avenue) in Madrona

Denny Way is an east–west arterial street in downtown Seattle, Washington, United States. It forms the northern end of the Belltown street grid as well as the boundaries of Belltown, Lower Queen Anne, South Lake Union, Denny Triangle, and Cascade. The street continues east through Capitol Hill to Madrona as a minor neighborhood street, ending near Madrona Park on Lake Washington.

== Street description ==
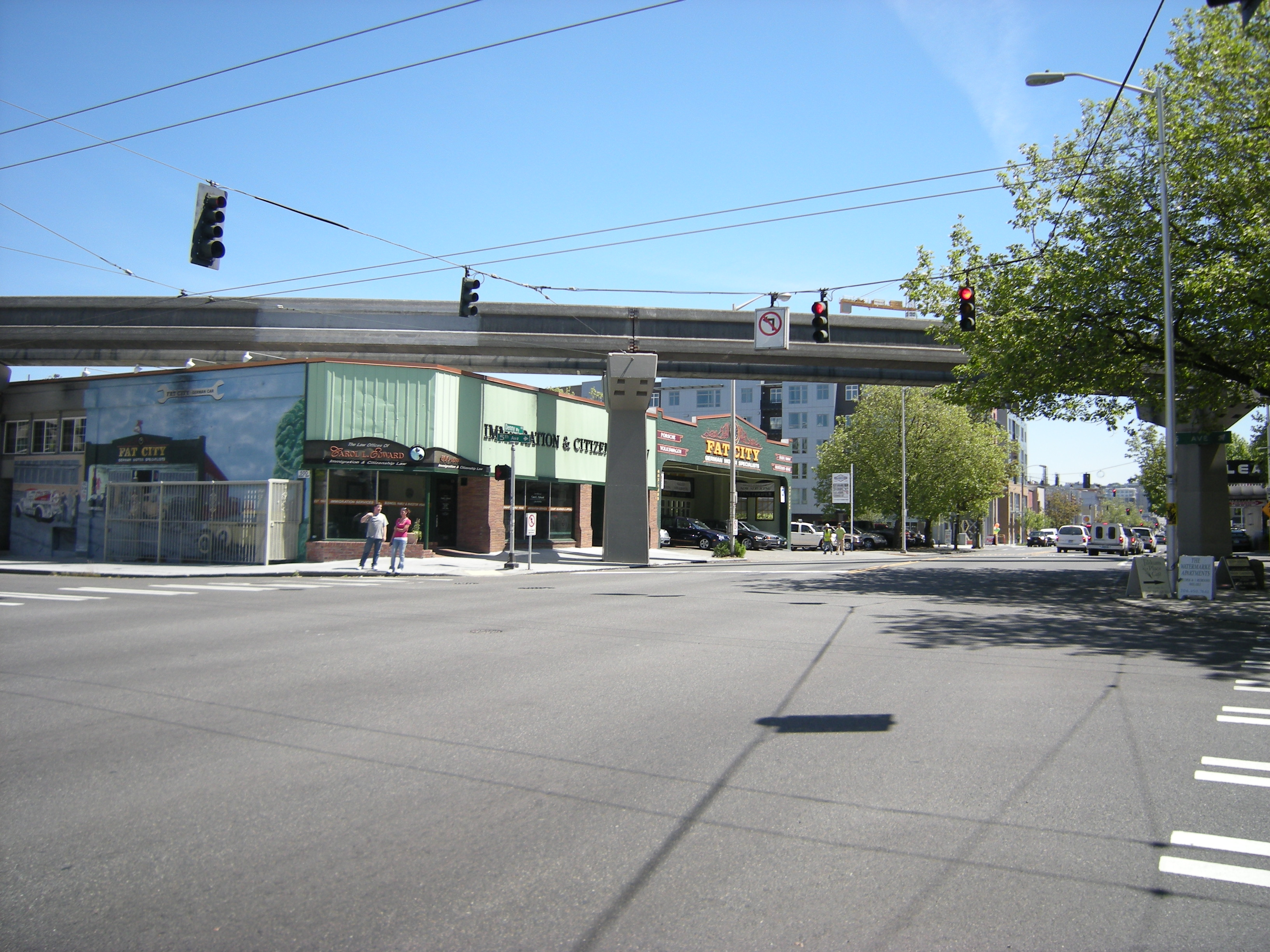
Looking east on Denny Way at 5th Avenue, where it crosses under the Seattle Monorail

Denny Way begins as an offshoot of Western Avenue, two blocks uphill from Myrtle Edwards Park on the Elliott Bay waterfront and near the former Seattle Post-Intelligencer offices. The street travels east through the dense commercial–residential district of Lower Queen Anne and passes the Seattle Center campus, including the Pacific Science Center and Space Needle. At 5th Avenue, adjacent to Tilikum Place and the KOMO-TV headquarters at KOMO Plaza, Denny Way passes under the Seattle Center Monorail and enters the South Lake Union neighborhood. The street crosses over what was once the north portal of the Battery Street Tunnel, a tunnel taken out of service in January 2019. Denny Way continues east, downhill along Denny Park to an intersection with Westlake Avenue at the heart of South Lake Union. The intersection includes a set of small plazas on its southwest and southeast sides that double as Seattle Streetcar stops.

From Westlake, Denny Way climbs a steep grade towards the Cascade neighborhood and passes the headquarters of The Seattle Times, which features a mounted news ticker. The street passes the Denny Substation and intersects onramps and offramps that connect to Interstate 5, which Denny Way then crosses to reach Capitol Hill. After an intersection with the diagonal-running Olive Way, Denny Way narrows into a two-lane residential street and shifts slightly north while passing several mid-rise apartment buildings. At Broadway, Denny Way becomes a westbound-only woonerf named Barbara Bailey Way, with drop-off lanes serving the adjacent Capitol Hill light rail station, whose south entrance is located on the south side of the street.

Past Cal Anderson Park, East Denny Way regains its name and becomes bi-directional again and travels uphill towards the Kaiser Permanente (formerly Group Health) campus at 15th Avenue East, where it shifts to the south. The street begins its descent into the Madison Valley and turns southeast to intersect Madison Street at 22nd Avenue. A second section of the street begins one block northeast at Madison and 23rd Avenue, running east to the Harrison Ridge Greenbelt at 32nd Avenue, where it shifts south to become part of Madrona Drive. The street continues southeast to Madrona Park on the western shore of Lake Washington. Sections of East Denny Way are among the steepest blocks in Seattle and are popular with street sledders during snowstorms.

From Downtown Seattle to Olive Way on Capitol Hill, Denny Way is classified as a major arterial street and as part of the National Highway System, a network of roads identified as important to the national economy, defense, and mobility. It also forms the northern boundary of the Belltown street grid, which is oriented towards a section of Elliott Bay, 49 degrees from true north. As a result, the street has several triangular blocks and irregular intersections on its south side, including Tilikum Place park. Denny Way is one of the busiest streets in Seattle, with an average weekday traffic volume of 39,100 vehicles in Lower Queen Anne. Its least-traveled section, near Madrona Drive, carried only 2,500 vehicles on an average weekday in 2016.

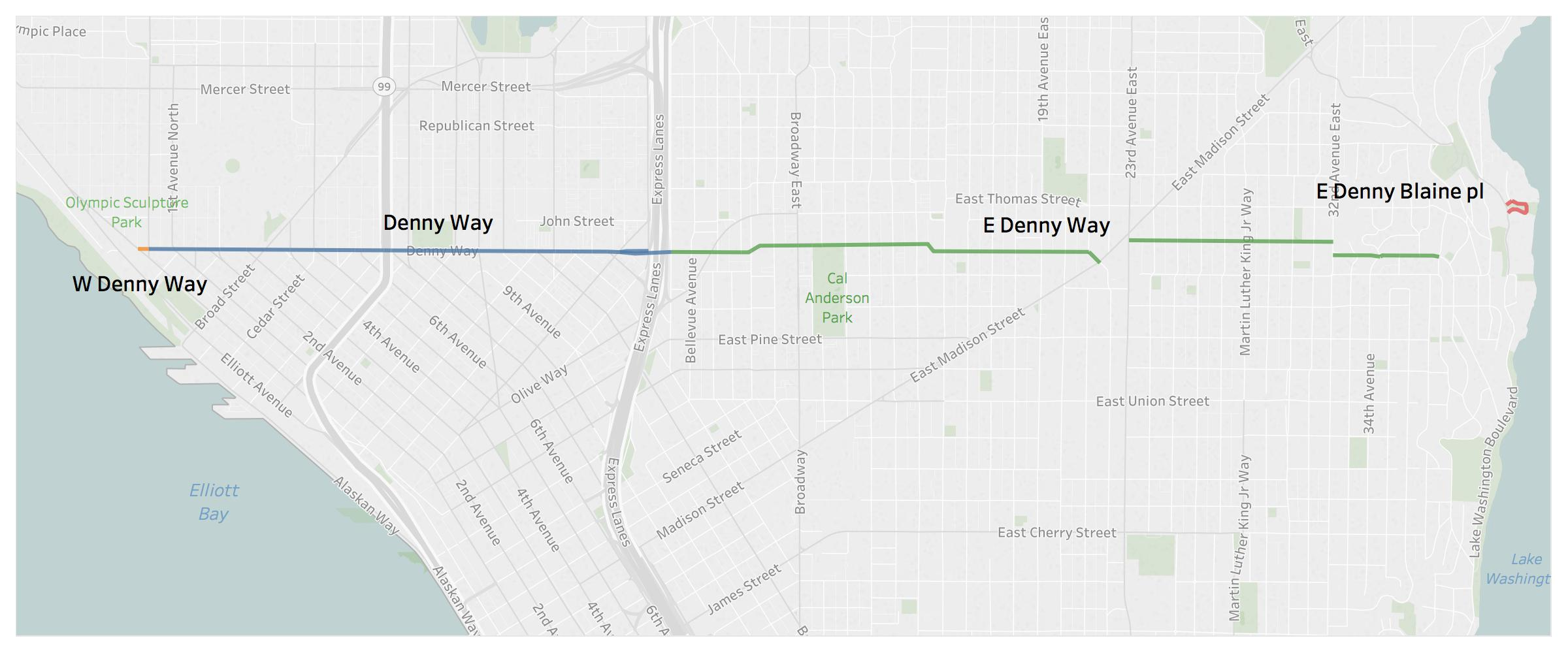
W. Denny Way (orange), Denny Way (blue), E. Denny Way (green), and E. Denny Blaine Place (red)

== History ==
The original 1852 survey for the town plat of Seattle began with a stake driven at what is now the west end of Denny Way. It also formed the boundary of pioneer David Denny's 1869 plat of "North Seattle", in what is now Lower Queen Anne. Denny initially named the road "Depot Street", as part of an unsuccessful attempt to build a major train terminal at its western end. The city government completed construction of a sewage tunnel under Depot Street in 1894, serving as the main outflow for northern Seattle. The street was renamed to Denny Way in 1895, as part of a city-wide name change to harmonize the names of grid-defining streets; other boundary streets to the east of downtown, including Decatur and Hawthorne avenues, were also merged into the new Denny Way.

The street originally ran across a section of Denny Hill, which was regraded by the city government in the 1910s and 1920s.

During excavation of Interstate 5 from 1962 to 1964, Denny Way was periodically closed or rerouted onto temporary roads or bridges built atop fill. The freeway overpass was opened to traffic on October 16, 1963, expanding the street to four lanes and adding several traffic signals.

A section of Denny Way between Broadway and Nagle Place was closed for the construction of the Capitol Hill light rail station and was redeveloped into a woonerf. It was renamed Barbara Bailey Way in 2019 to honor a local businesswoman and LGBTQ activist.

== Buildings ==
Notable structures on Denny Way include the Denny Substation; Cornish College of the Arts; the Seattle Center complex, site of the 1962 World's Fair; and Denny Park, Seattle's first public park. The park and the street are both named for David Denny, one of the city's first settlers, who owned much of the land surrounding what is now Seattle Center. Between Westlake Avenue and I-5, Denny Way is zoned for high-rise residential buildings and is expected to be redeveloped into a "street canyon" in the late 2010s and early 2020s.

== Transit service ==
Denny Way is primarily served by King County Metro route 8, a major cross-town bus route that debuted in 1995. The bus route suffers from traffic congestion and schedule unreliability, leading to a 2016 plan to add bus lanes and queue jumps along part of Denny Way in South Lake Union. A short eastbound section, in the center lane near Stewart Street, opened in August 2018 to bypass delays caused by vehicles turning towards Yale Avenue and Interstate 5. An expansion of the bus lane was announced by mayor Katie Wilson in January 2026 and opened in late August, with the eastbound lane near Stewart Street moved back to the curb and a slip lane to Yale Avenue closed to traffic. The eastbound bus lane extends one mile (1.6 km) from 5th Avenue to Stewart Street.

The route crosses two Link light rail stations on north–south lines: Capitol Hill station at Broadway, opened in 2016, and a future light rail station at Westlake Avenue that is planned to open in 2035. Transit advocates have also considered Denny Way as a potential cross-town light rail corridor, which was not considered in the Sound Transit 3 plan.

In the 2010s, transit advocates also suggested that Denny Way could be served by an aerial tramway system, with stops between the Olympic Sculpture Park and Capitol Hill station.

== Major intersections ==
The entire highway is in Seattle, King County.

mi	km	Destinations	Notes
0.0	0.0	Western Avenue	
0.6	0.97	SR 99 (Aurora Avenue)	Northbound exit and southbound entrance
0.9	1.4	Westlake Avenue	
1.3	2.1	I-5	Southbound exit and entrance only
1.7	2.7	Broadway	
2.6	4.2	Madison Street, 22nd Avenue	
Gap in street
2.6	4.2	23rd Avenue	
2.9	4.7	Martin Luther King Jr. Way	
3.5	5.6	Madrona Place, 38th Avenue	Continues east as Madrona Drive towards Madrona Park
1.000 mi = 1.609 km; 1.000 km = 0.621 mi: Incomplete access
