= Mercer Street (Seattle) =

Street in Seattle, Washington, U.S.

- Mercer Place
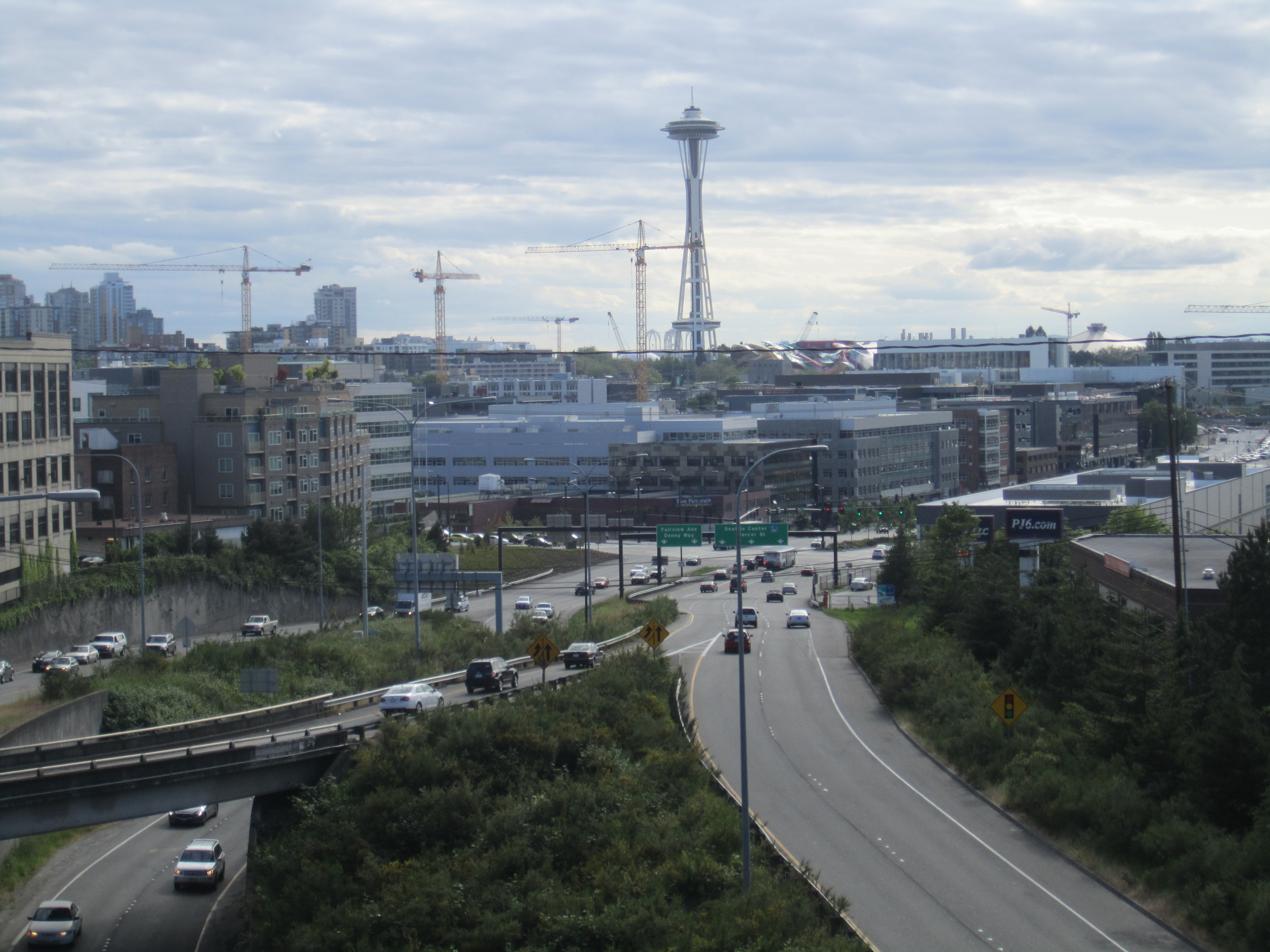
- Looking west on Mercer Street from I-5 towards the South Lake Union neighborhood
- Namesake: Thomas Mercer
- Type: Arterial street
- Maintained by: Seattle Department of Transportation
- Length: 1.9 mi (3.1 km)
- Location: Seattle
- West end: Elliot Avenue West in Interbay
- Major junctions: Westlake Avenue in South Lake Union
- East end: I-5 in Cascade

Mercer Street is a major east–west thoroughfare in the Lower Queen Anne and South Lake Union neighborhoods of Seattle, Washington. It travels 2 miles (3.2 km) and connects Elliott Avenue to the west and Interstate 5 to the east, serving as one of several downtown exits on the freeway. The street carries an average weekday volume of 38,000 vehicles on its central section.

== Street description ==
Mercer Street begins as Mercer Place, at an intersection with Elliot Avenue West between the Elliott Bay waterfront and Kinnear Park on Queen Anne Hill. The narrow road travels southeast up a short hill to 5th Avenue West, where it turns due east onto West Mercer Street. The street passes through the built-up Lower Queen Anne neighborhood and widens to four lanes at Queen Anne Avenue. Mercer Street continues east through the north part of the Seattle Center, passing the Seattle Repertory Theatre, McCaw Hall, and Memorial Stadium.

The street then passes the headquarters of the Bill and Melinda Gates Foundation and gains a protected bike lane on its north side as it passes under Aurora Avenue North (State Route 99). Mercer Street travels east through South Lake Union as a landscaped boulevard with six lanes, passing between the campuses of Amazon.com and Google, to the south and north respectively. The street crosses the path of the South Lake Union Streetcar at Westlake and Terry avenues, just south of Lake Union Park and the Museum of History and Industry. After Fairview Avenue, Mercer enters an interchange with Interstate 5, with direct ramps to the freeway and its reversible express lanes. Several short neighborhood streets in Capitol Hill, Madison Valley, and Washington Park are also named East Mercer Street but are discontinuous from one another.

The downtown section of Mercer Street is classified as a major arterial street and is part of the National Highway System, a network of roads identified as important to the national economy, defense, and mobility. It is also one of the busiest streets in Seattle, carrying an average weekday traffic volume of 38,000 vehicles between Taylor and Dexter avenues and 66,100 vehicles on the approach to I-5. Its least-traveled section, near Elliott Avenue, carried only 11,000 vehicles on an average weekday in 2016. The street also has a short protected bicycle lane under Aurora Avenue that carries an average of 700 bicyclists per day.

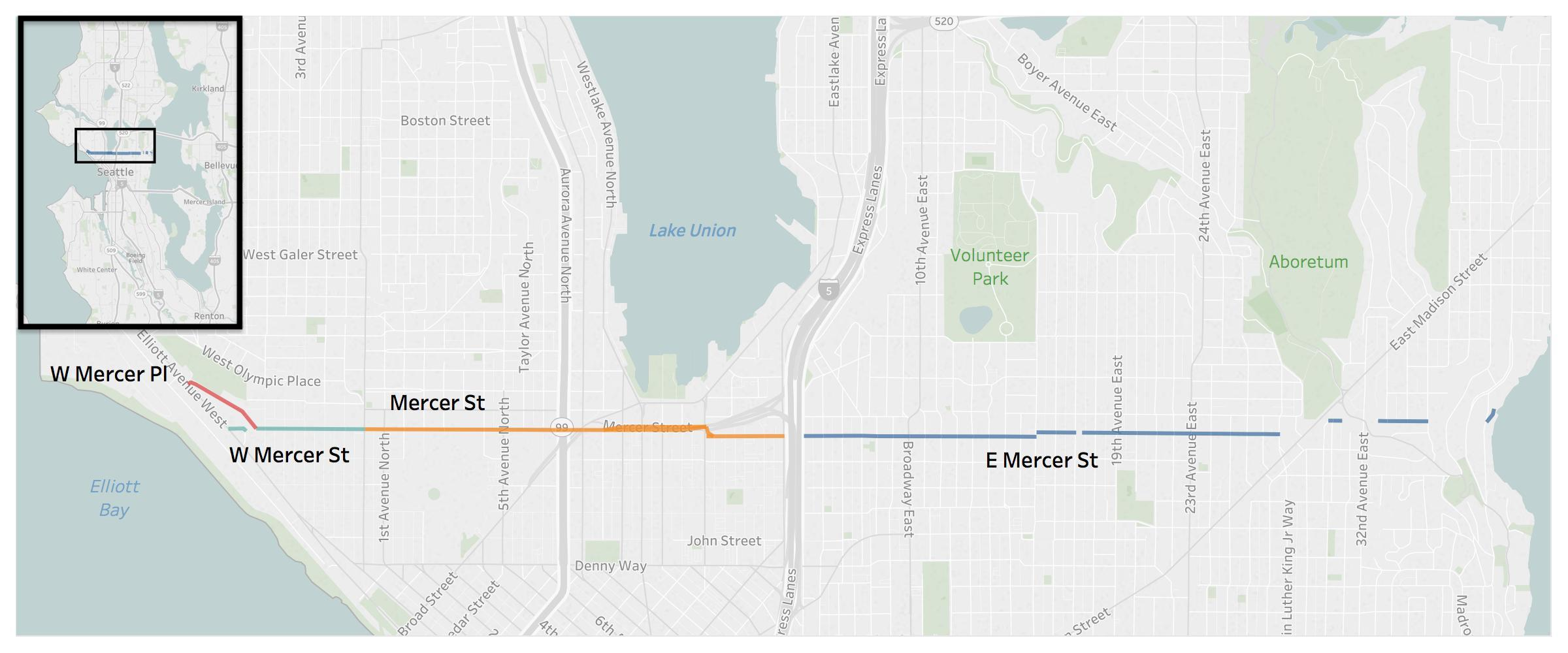
W. Mercer Place (red), W. Mercer Street (light blue), Mercer Street, and E. Mercer Street (dark blue)

== History ==
Mercer Street, named for settler Thomas Mercer, was planned in the early 1860s as part of the initial street grid of Lower Queen Anne. A wagon road along what is now Mercer Street was constructed between Lower Queen Anne and Farm Street (later Aurora Avenue) in 1885.

During construction of Mercer Street's interchange with Interstate 5 in the 1960s, a tooth belonging to a Woolly mammoth was found by a bulldozer operator. It was estimate to be 12,000 to 14,000 years old at the time of its discovery.

In the 2010s, the Seattle Department of Transportation embarked on a $190.5 million project to widen and improve Mercer Street, which would be restored to bi-directional traffic between Aurora Avenue and Interstate 5. Construction began in September 2010 and the restoration of bi-directional traffic took two years, opening on August 27, 2012. The two-way segment was extended west to 9th Avenue North on May 30, 2014, removing the final section of one-way traffic on Mercer Street, while also permanently closing Broad Street in preparation for the Alaskan Way Viaduct replacement tunnel project.

On April 27, 2019, a construction crane collapsed onto Mercer Street near its intersection of Fairview Avenue, crushing several cars in the eastbound lanes. At least four people were killed by the collapse.
