= Westlake Boulevard =

Westlake Boulevard may refer to:

- Former name of Westlake Avenue in Seattle, Washington, United States
- A section of California State Route 23 in Southern California, United States
