= McGraw Square =

Plaza in Seattle, Washington, U.S.

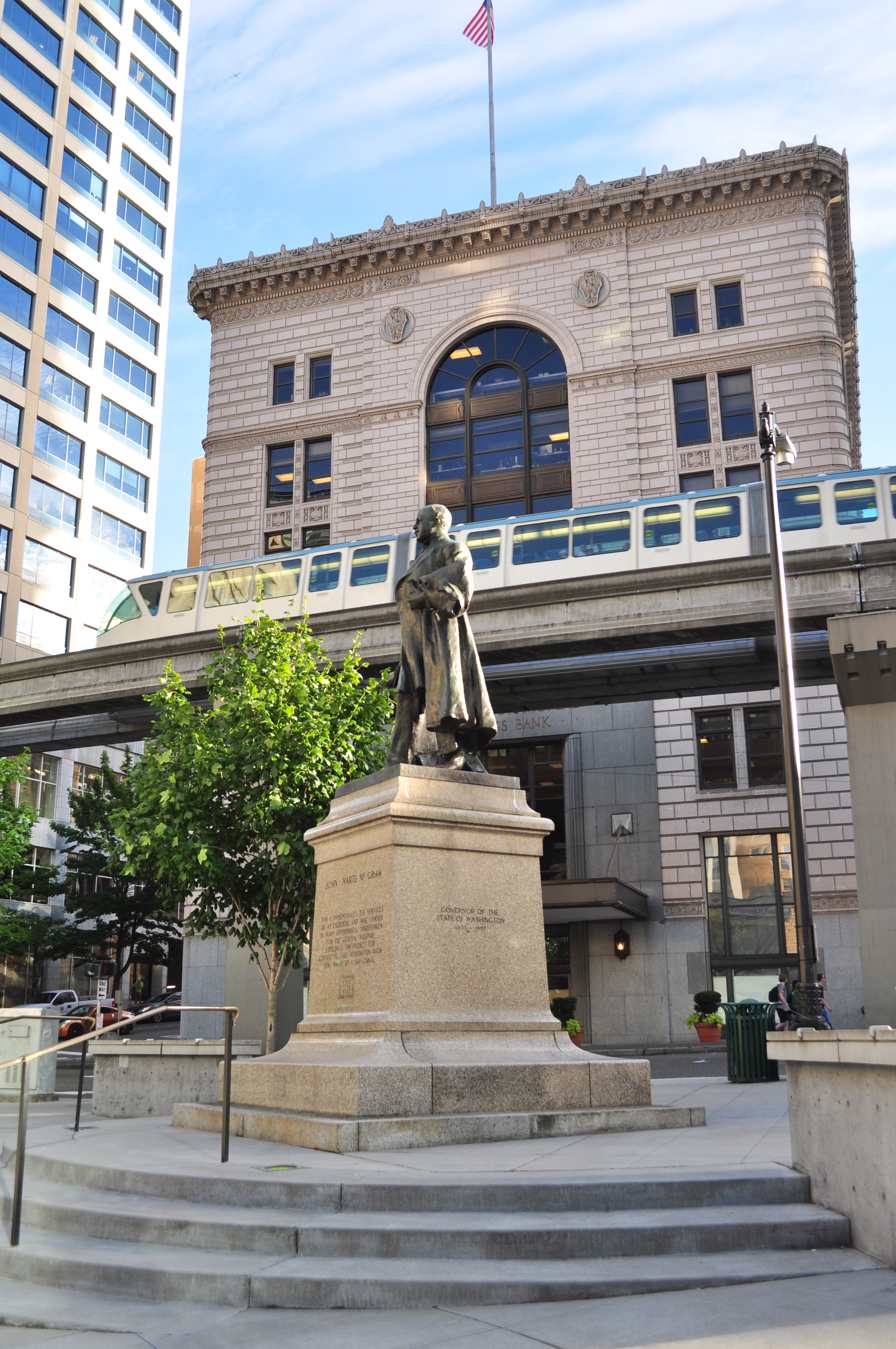
- The Seattle Center Monorail passing behind the statue of John Harte McGraw
- Interactive map of McGraw Square
- Type: Plaza
- Location: Seattle, Washington
- Coordinates: 47.612982°N 122.337602°W
- Area: 0.01 acres (0.0040 ha)
- Created: July 22, 1913
- Operator: Seattle Parks and Recreation
- Status: Open all year
- Designation: Seattle Landmark since May 6, 1985

McGraw Square is a small plaza and streetcar stop in the Denny Triangle neighborhood of Seattle, Washington. The 0.01-acre (0.0040 ha) park, one of the smallest in the city park system, is named for and features a statue of former King County Sheriff and Governor of Washington John Harte McGraw. McGraw Square is bounded to the north by Stewart Street, to the west by 5th Avenue and the Times Square Building, and to the east by Olive Way and the Medical Dental Building.

The square was originally a 660-square-foot (61 m^{2}) parcel acquired by the City of Seattle in 1911 to build a public square to be designed by the Olmsted Brothers. Richard E. Brooks was commissioned to sculpt a bronze statue of Governor McGraw, who had died in 1910, and unveiled the finished sculpture on July 22, 1913. It was later designated as a Seattle Landmark on May 6, 1985. The statue measures approximately 6 feet (1.8 m) x 4 feet (1.2 m) x 4 feet (1.2 m) and rests on a granite base that measures approximately 7 feet (2.1 m) x 6.5 feet (2.0 m) x 6.5 feet (2.0 m).

In late 2010, the Seattle Department of Transportation expanded the plaza over a section of Westlake Avenue and incorporating the nearby South Lake Union Streetcar terminus at a cost of $900,000, paid by a mobility grant from the Washington State Department of Transportation. The new plaza, which is intended to host tables and food trucks, was opened to the public on February 9, 2011.

== See also ==
- Westlake Square, a similar open space one block north
