= Denny Substation =

Electrical substation in Seattle, Washington

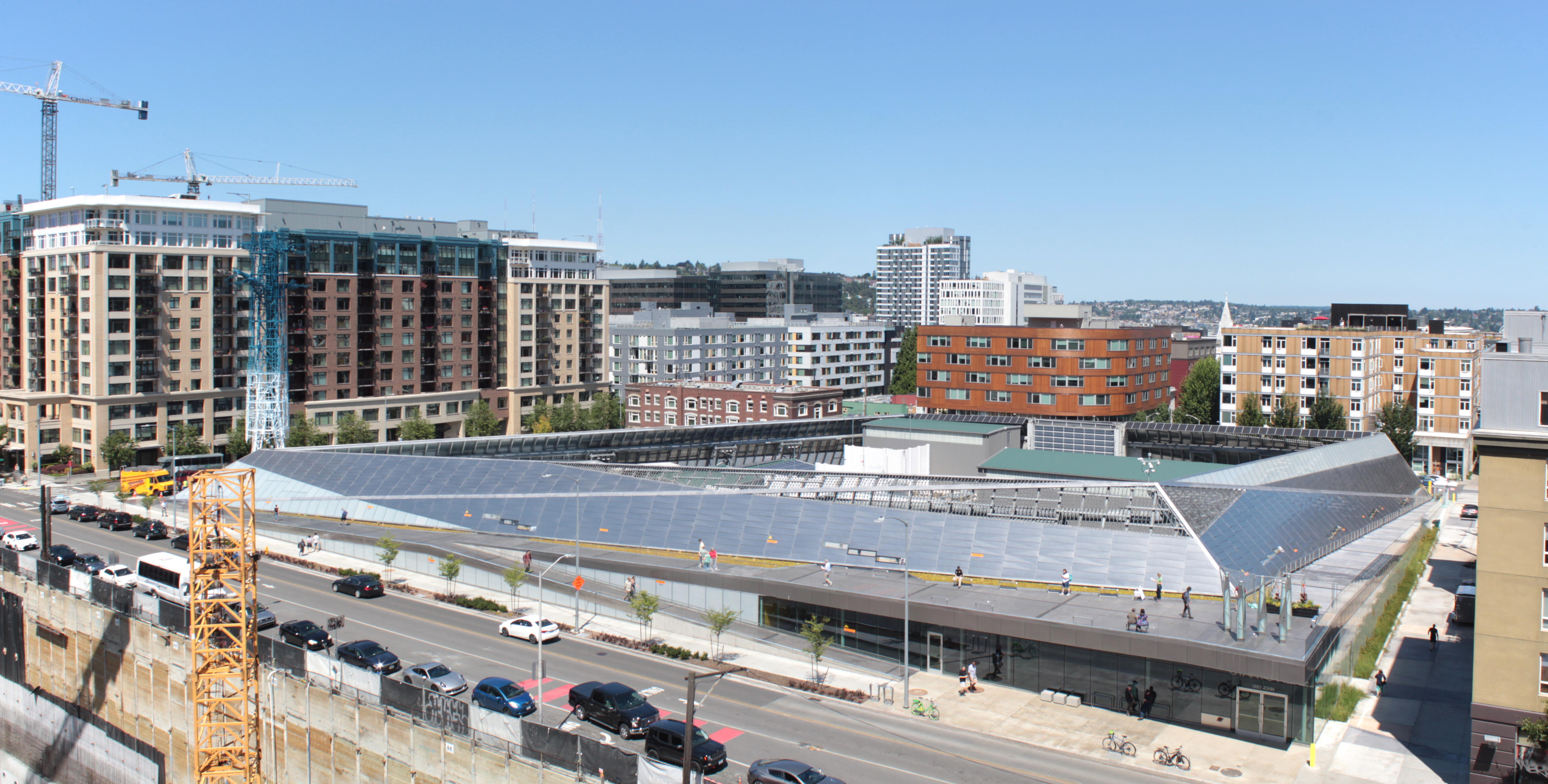
- View from the south side
- Interactive map of the Denny Substation area

General information
- Type: Electrical substation
- Location: 1250 Denny Way; Seattle, Washington
- Coordinates: 47°37′08.8″N 122°19′53.8″W
- Construction started: 2016
- Completed: October 2018
- Inaugurated: July 20, 2019
- Cost: $210 million
- Owner: Seattle City Light

Dimensions
- Diameter: 184 ft (56 m)

Design and construction
- Architecture firm: NBBJ
- Engineer: POWER Engineers
- Structural engineer: KPFF Consulting Engineers
- Main contractor: Walsh Construction

The Denny Substation is an electrical substation located in the South Lake Union neighborhood of Seattle, Washington, and operated by Seattle City Light. The facility takes up a whole city block along Denny Way and features a community center, interpretive exhibits, a dog park, and public art.

The substation was proposed in the early 2000s, during redevelopment of South Lake Union into a high-tech hub. A former Greyhound bus garage was acquired by Seattle City Light and demolished in 2014. Construction on the Denny Substation, including a street vacation to close part of Pontius Avenue, began in 2016 and was completed in 2018, at a cost of $210 million.

== History ==
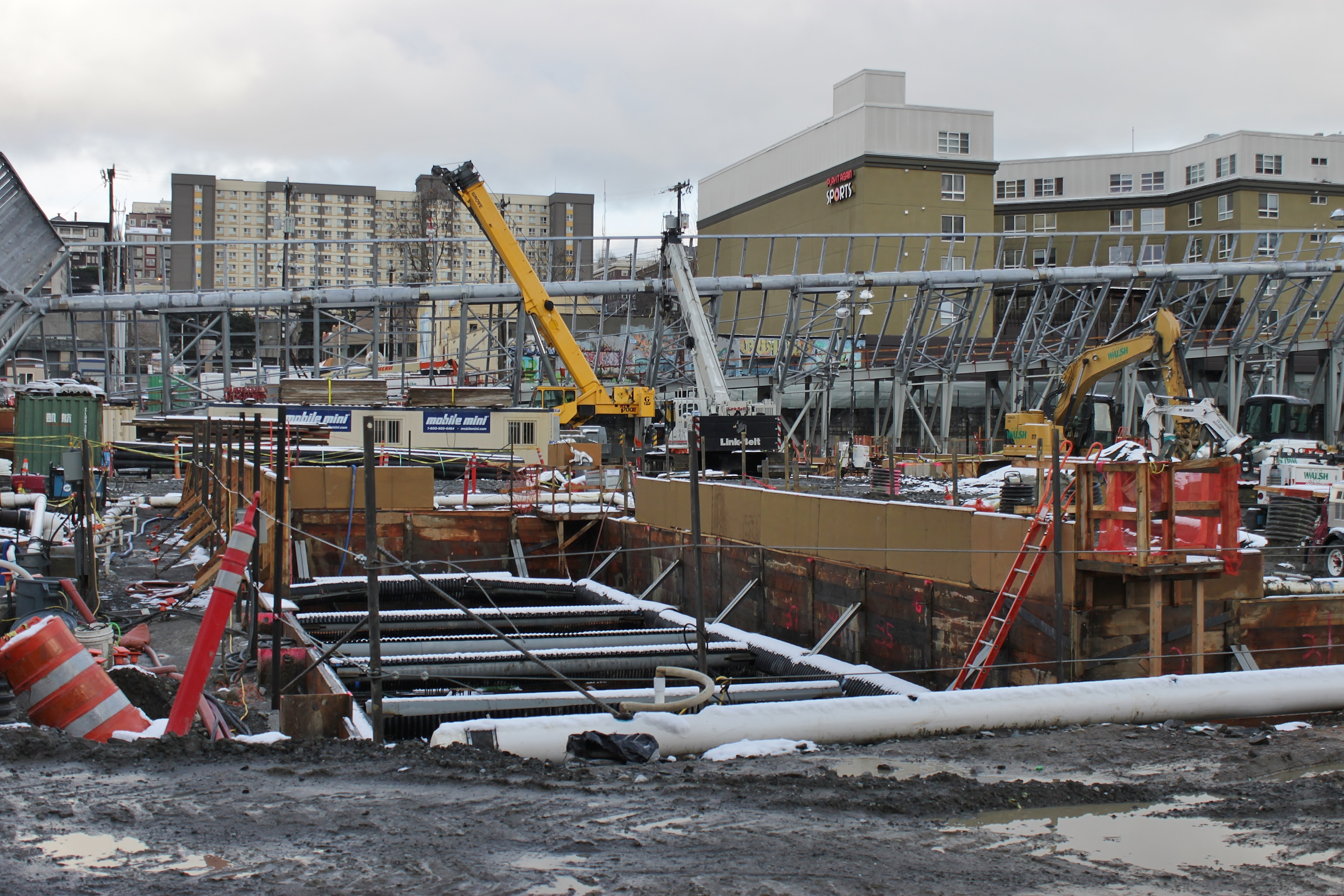
Under construction in early 2017

Historically, the South Lake Union neighborhood of Seattle, located to the north of downtown and east of the Seattle Center, was a manufacturing district whose electrical power was supplied by the Broad Street Substation. After the failure of the Seattle Commons plan in the 1990s, which proposed a large city park over the neighborhood, the land was opened for development by Paul Allen's Vulcan Real Estate, which envisioned it as a hub for biotech and high tech firms. Vulcan and Seattle City Light began talks of collaborating to build a $160 million substation in Interbay or South Lake Union in 2003, expecting the additional high tech firms to put a strain on the Broad Street substation and neighborhood lines laid in the early 2000s. In 2005, Seattle City Light determined that adding capacity at the Broad Street substation through new transformer banks would be sufficient for the area's needs until the mid-2010s.

Seattle City Light proposed demolishing the Greyhound bus garage on Denny Way for its new substation in 2006, with consultants recommending that the city acquire the site for $40 million as soon as possible. The site was purchased by Seattle City Light in October 2008 and vacated by Greyhound in 2010. From 2012 to 2014, Seattle City Light demolished the Greyhound facility and removed contaminated soils in preparation for construction. During the period between environmental cleanup and the start of construction, the vacant lot was used for a series of temporary public art installations collectively called All Rise.

Final approval for the project was granted in August 2015 by the Seattle City Council, who also approved the substation's unconventional design incorporating public benefits in exchange for a street vacation. Walsh Construction was awarded the construction contract for the substation project, working alongside subcontractors Valley Electric, W.A. Chester and Transcon. Construction of the substation began in May 2016, and by the end of the year, the first outer walls were erected. The substation's three transformers, each weighing 6.5 short tons (5,900 kg), were installed in 2017.

The Denny Substation was energized in April 2018 and was formally opened in October, becoming the first new substation built by Seattle City Light in 30 years. Construction of the substation required long-term closures of a westbound lane on Denny Way and postponed the installation of a bus lane on the street. A formal opening ceremony was held on July 20, 2019, with remarks from city leaders and events sponsored by local businesses. The substation began supplying electricity later that year and is planned to be linked to another downtown substation after 2020.

== Design ==
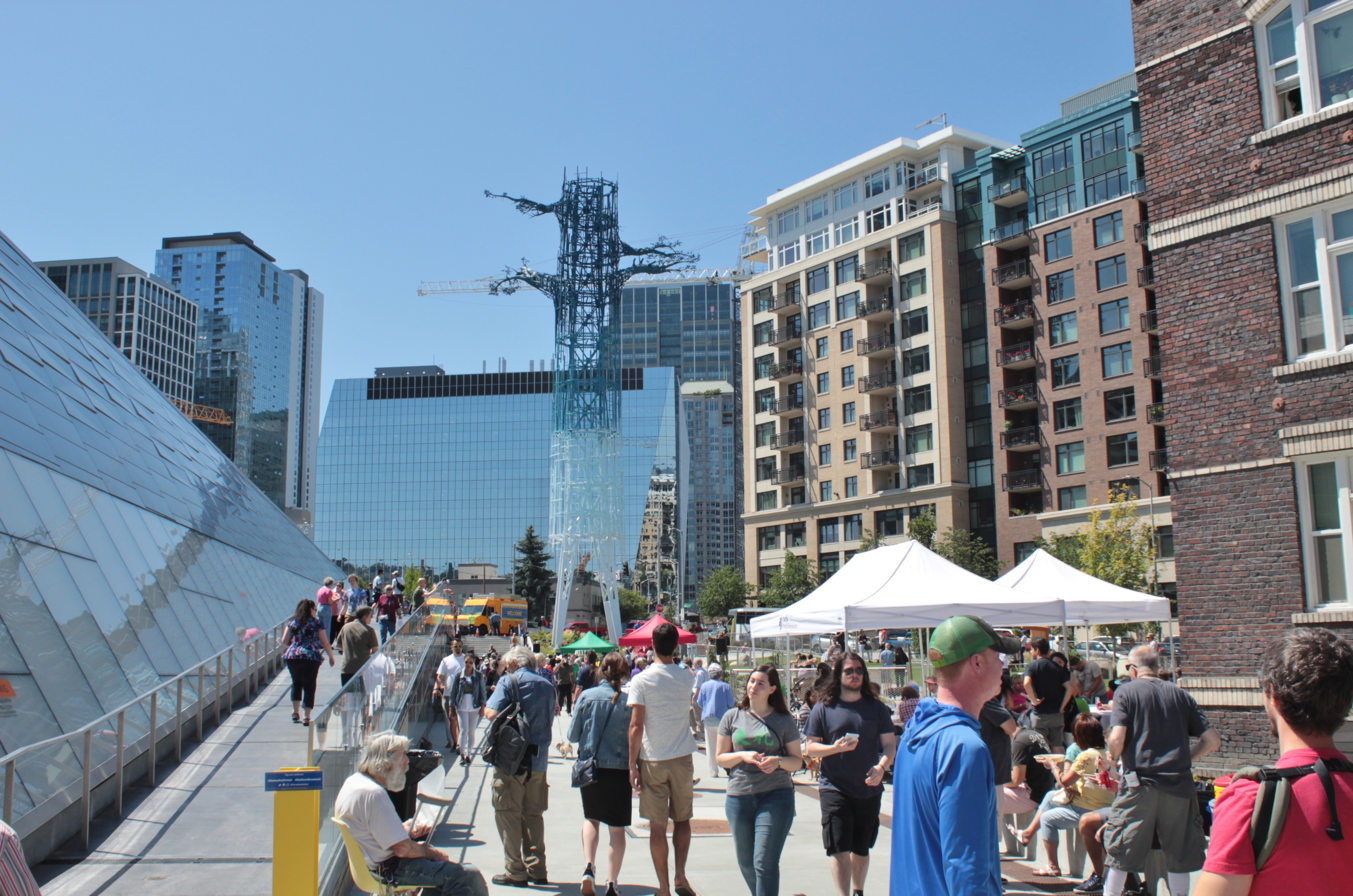
Opening day ceremonies at the Denny Substation on July 20, 2019

The Denny Substation features an unusual design that incorporates public spaces and community amenities into an otherwise utilitarian structure. The 110,000 sq ft (10,000 m^{2}) substation, designed by architectural firm NBBJ, is shaped in the form of an acute trapezoid, with its longest side facing Denny Way. The structure slopes inward, allowing for sunlight to reach the open spaces surrounding the substation. The outer walls use 35-foot-high (11 m) stainless steel panels (16 feet (4.9 m) above street level) with a 1/4-mile (0.40 km) elevated pedestrian ramp to provide views of the cityscape and the substation's interior.

In exchange for a street vacation that eliminated a block of Pontius Avenue, the Denny Substation project is required to include public benefits. The substation has 44,000 sq ft (4,100 m^{2}) of open space located on its western side, including an off-leash area for dogs and public art. At the southeast corner of the facility is a community space with a gallery space, exhibit hall, a small theater, and an educational center known as the "Energy Inspiration Center". A King County Metro bus stop on Denny Way will be integrated into the substation, with enhanced shelters and real-time arrival information. A sound art installation was placed in a nearby alley, projecting the noise of rushing water in reference to the hydroelectric facilities located around the region.

The substation has two major pieces of public art, as part of the municipal percent for art program. Transforest by Lead Pencil Studio is a 110-foot-tall (34 m) sculpture that combines the forms of an old-growth tree and a modern transmission tower. On the exterior walls of the substation house Ned Khan's Switchwall, consisting of a strip of colored lights that change based on wind flows.

Earlier design concepts featured a more standard substation with 40-foot-high (12 m) walls, or incorporating the facility into the base of a high-rise building. The chosen design was described as a "a celebration of the functionality" and called the "coolest electrical substation ever" by Slate. Lead designer John Savo of NBBJ stated that they "[didn't] want it to be your grandfather's substation", desiring a facility that would "engage [with] the community, to make it an amenity and not a distraction".

== Cost ==
When first proposed in the 2000s, the substation project was estimated to cost up to $150 million because of space limits and mitigation. The price rose to $174 million by 2014 after integration of public benefits and open space, as well as the relocation of the Amazon headquarters to nearby Denny Triangle. After the completion of design work and environmental cleanup in 2015, the substation's cost was revised to $210 million because of unexpected soil contamination and the need for newer electrical equipment. The substation's construction costs are funded by Seattle City Light through regular rate increases for customers as part of their six-year Strategic Plan.

== Specifications ==
The Denny Substation has an initial capacity of 50 Megavolt-ampere (MVA), and could increase to 405 MVA with future expansions. An underground distribution network directs electricity from the substation to the Denny Triangle and South Lake Union neighborhoods. The substation is planned to be connected to the Massachusetts Substation in SoDo via a 115-kilovolt (kV) transmission line through Downtown Seattle. The use of a gas-insulated switchgear in the Denny Substation allowed for a smaller footprint; the facility also uses solar cells to produce its electricity and a heat recovery system. Outside consultants hired by the city government in 2018 later concluded that the overall demand in the Denny Triangle and South Lake Union area would rise to 60 megawatts by 2027, far below the 180-megawatt capacity that the substation was designed for.
