= Madison Valley, Seattle =

Neighborhood in Seattle, Washington, U.S.

Coordinates: 47°36′58.4″N 122°17′57.3″W

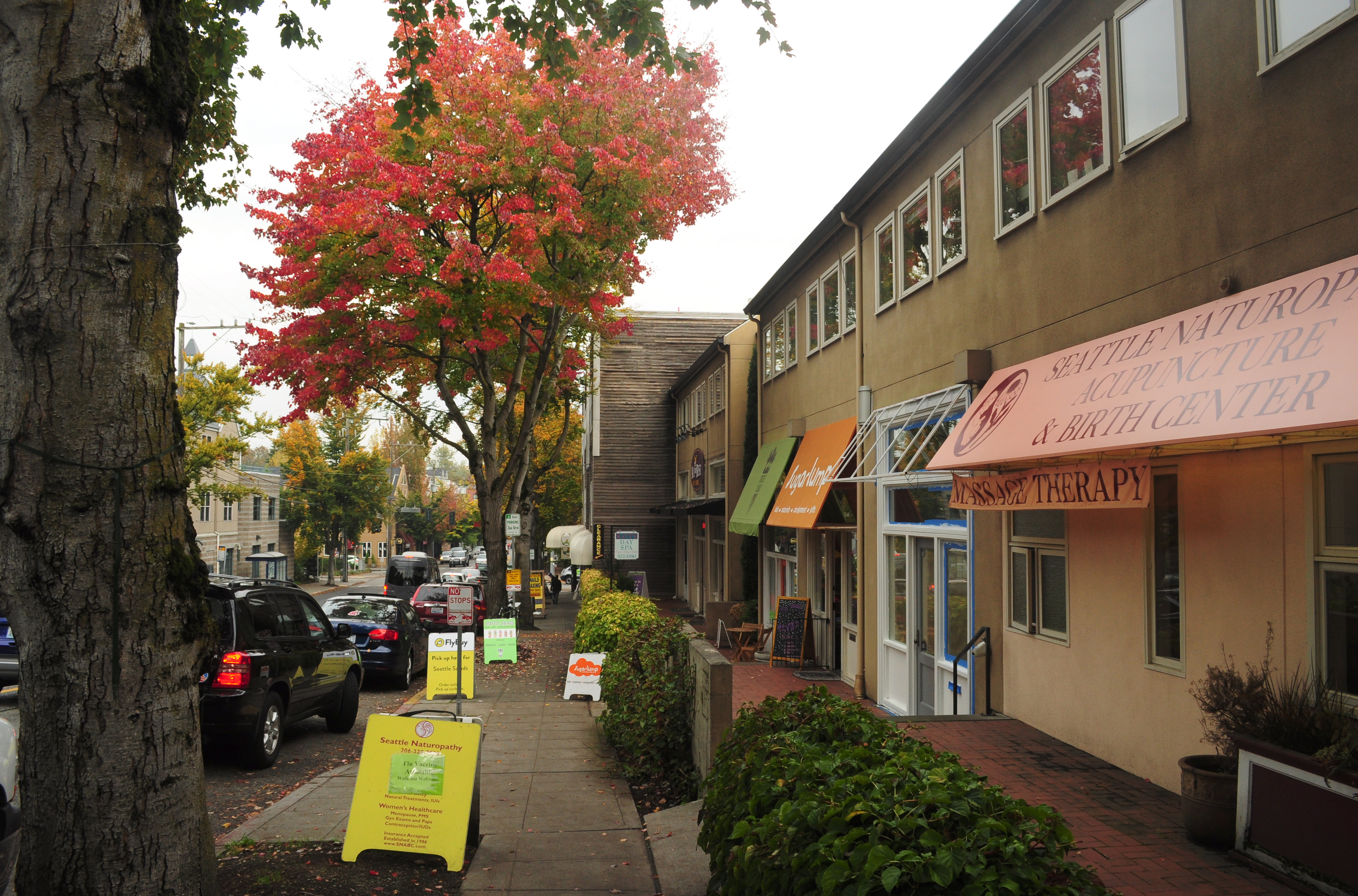
Shops along East Madison Street in Madison Valley

Madison Valley is a neighborhood in Seattle located east of Capitol Hill; west of Washington Park; south of Montlake; and north of Madrona.

According to the Madison Valley Community Council, the neighborhood is "bounded to the north by East Helen Street to Lake Washington Blvd E, to the west by 23rd Avenue East to E Denny Way, to the east by Lake Washington Boulevard to 36th Ave E then 36th Ave E south to E Denny Way, and to the south by East Denny Way."
