= Group Health Cooperative =

Former American nonprofit healthcare organization in Seattle

- Company type: Nonprofit
- Industry: Healthcare
- Founded: December 22, 1945 (80 years ago)
- Founders: Thomas G. Bevan, Ella Willams, Addison Shoudy, R.M Mitchell, and Stanley Erickson
- Defunct: February 1, 2017 (9 years ago)
- Headquarters: United States
- Website: www.ghc.org

Group Health Cooperative, formerly known as Group Health Cooperative of Puget Sound, later more commonly known as Group Health, was an American nonprofit healthcare organization based in Seattle, Washington. It was acquired by Kaiser Permanente in 2017 and now serves as the Kaiser Washington region. The new region would serve the majority of Washington state except for the Southwest Washington counties of Clark and Cowlitz, which would continue to be served by the Portland-area Kaiser Permanente Northwest.

== Business model ==
Established in 1945 (81 years ago), Group Health provided coverage and care for about 600,000 people in Washington and Idaho.

== Corporate structure ==
Despite being marketed as a cooperative for much of the organization's history, Group Health never legally presented itself as a cooperative. It was a nonprofit organization with members. Members were always able to amend bylaws and elect a board of trustees, but never owned organization assets or directly controlled operations.

Group Health Community Foundation (GHCF) was funded with the acquisition of Group Health by Kaiser Permanente in 2017 with approximately $1.8 billion in assets. Founded in 1983, the new GHCF is entirely independent of Kaiser Permanente. GHCF may continue to invest in efforts to improve health and health care through immunizations, innovation, and patient care.

== History ==
Group Health was officially registered as a corporation in Washington on December 22, 1945. Group Health's founders included Thomas G. Bevan, then president of lodge 751 of the International Association of Machinists and Aerospace Workers at Boeing; Ella Willams, a leader in a local chapter of The National Grange of the Order of Patrons of Husbandry; Addison Shoudy, R.M Mitchell, and Stanley Erickson, who were pioneers in the American cooperative movement; and other community members who had no strong past affiliation with any particular social group.

Originally named Group Health Cooperative of Puget Sound, the "of Puget Sound" was dropped in 1995.

The Seattle Times noted in 2012 that non-profit insurance companies, including Premera Blue Cross, Regence BlueShield, and Group Health, were stockpiling billions of dollars in reserves while increasing their rates at the same time.

On December 4, 2015, it was announced that Group Health would be acquired by Kaiser Permanente. In January 2017 Washington State regulators endorsed the acquisition of Group Health by Kaiser Permanente. The acquisition resulted in a newly formed not-for-profit 501(c)(4) under the name Group Health Community Foundation (GHCF).

== Group Health Research Institute ==
Group Health's research leg was the Group Health Research Institute (GHRI), formerly known as Group Health Center for Health Studies. Now known as Kaiser Permanente Washington Health Research Institute (KPWHRI), it works with institutions such as the University of Washington and the National Institutes of Health. It is a member of the Health Care Systems Research Network (HCSRN), formerly known as the HMO Research Network.

== Group Health Cooperative Medical Library ==
Group Health Cooperative Medical Library was founded in 1969. As of 2008 it subscribed to 9,000 electronic journals and had 450 books. It specializes in allied health professions, medicine, health maintenance organizations, health administration, nursing, and pharmacy.

== Notable staff ==
Scott Armstrong became president and CEO of Group Health in 2003. He is a commissioner of the Medicare Payment Advisory Commission, board chair of the Alliance of Community Health Plans, a board member of America's Health Insurance Plans and the Pacific Science Center, a member of the Community Development Roundtable in Seattle, and a fellow of the American College of Healthcare Executives. He was named among the top 40 of the "100 Most Powerful People in Healthcare" in 2010 by Modern Healthcare magazine.

== Gallery ==
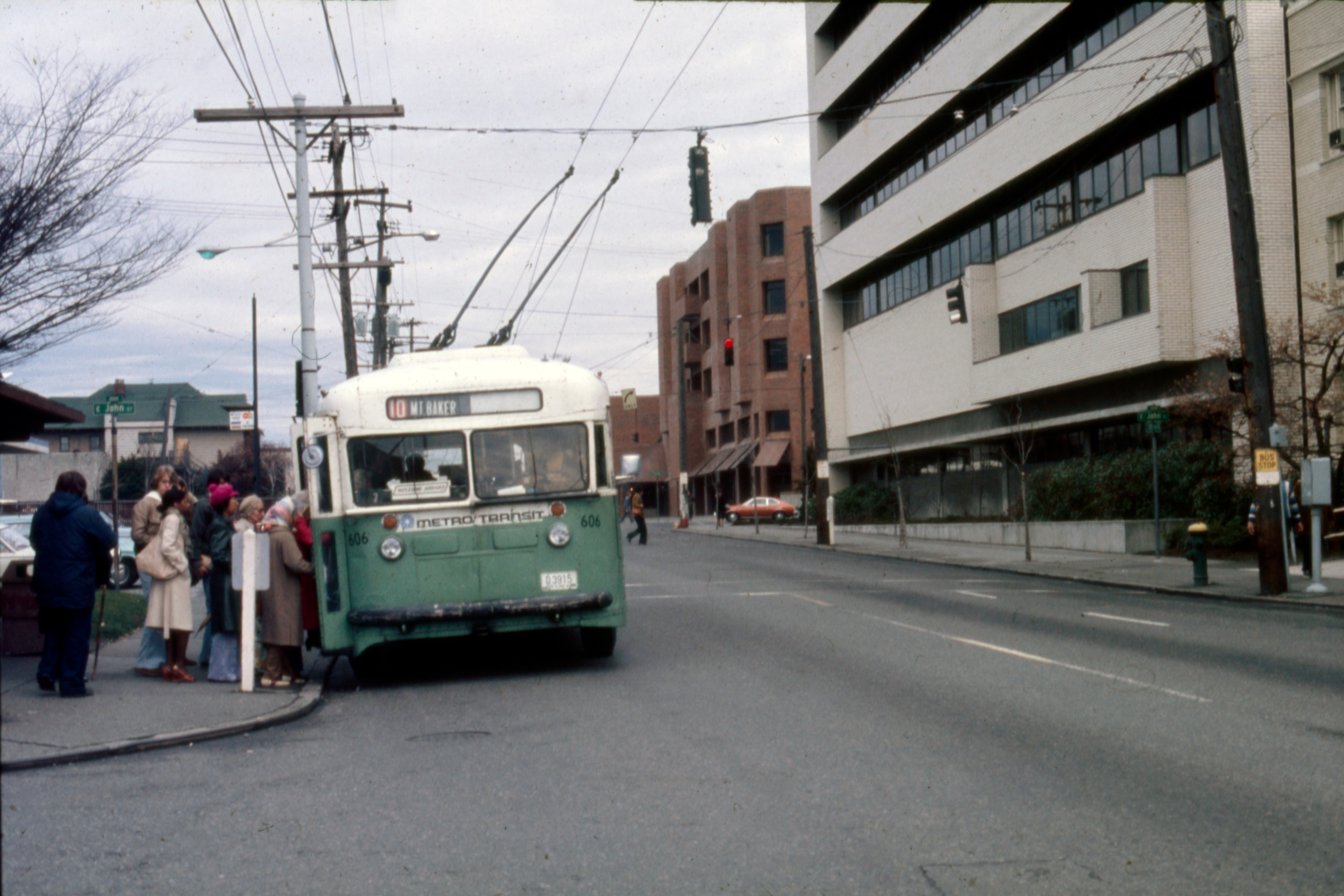
15th Ave. E. bus stop in Seattle, circa 1976, with a Group Health building (now Kaiser Permanente) at right

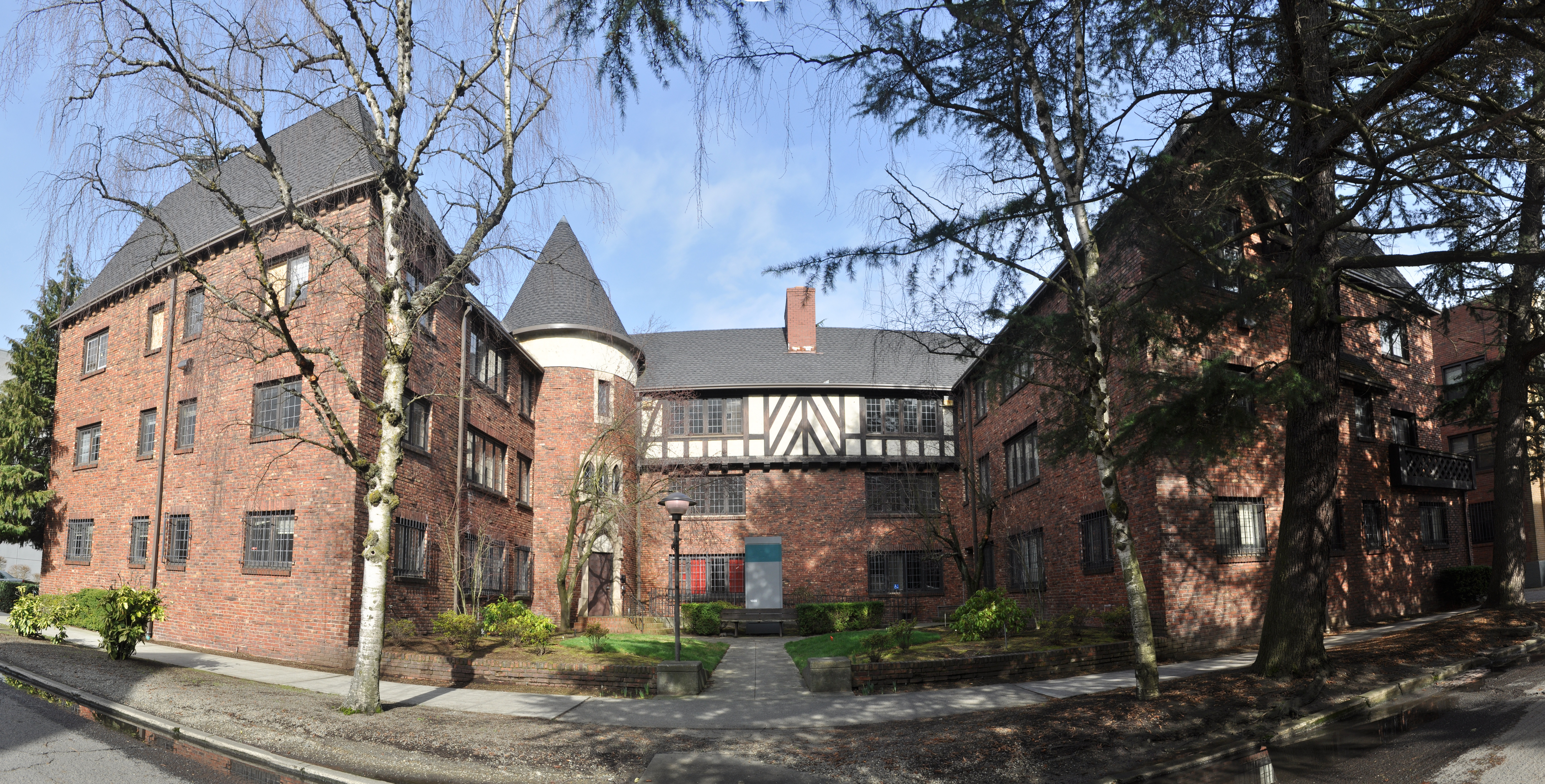
Panoramic view of the former Group Health East Building (a former apartment house), 1600 E. John Street, Capitol Hill, Seattle

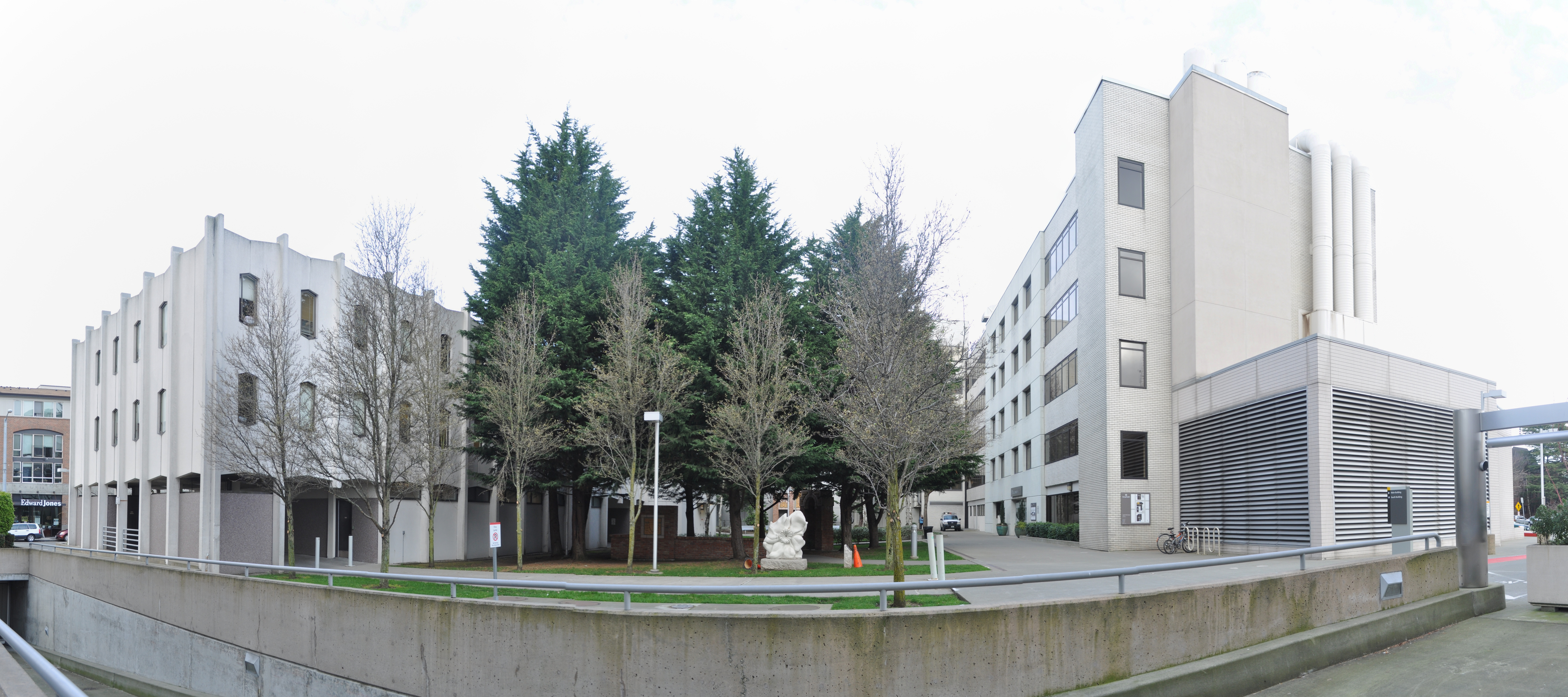
Panoramic view of the Group Health Hospital's courtyard, now Kaiser Permanente's Capitol Hill Campus in Seattle
