= Seattle Department of Transportation =

Government agency in state Washington

Department overview
- Formed: November 18, 1996
- Preceding department: Seattle Engineering Department
- Type: Department of transportation
- Jurisdiction: Seattle, Washington
- Headquarters: Seattle Municipal Tower; 700 Fifth Avenue, Suite 3800; Seattle, Washington; 47°36′18″N 122°19′47″W
- Employees: 758
- Annual budget: $450 million (2017)
- Department executive: Greg Spotts, Director
- Child department: Seattle Streetcar
- Website: seattle.gov/transportation

The Seattle Department of Transportation (SDOT) is a municipal government agency in Seattle, Washington that is responsible for the maintenance of the city's transportation systems, including roads, bridges, and public transportation. The agency is funded primarily by taxes that are supplemented by voter-approved levies from other sources; its budget in 2017 was $450 million.

== History ==
The Seattle Transportation Department was formed in 1996, as part of the re-organization and eventual dissolution of the Seattle Engineering Department. The division was renamed to the "Seattle Department of Transportation" in 2004.

== Administration and management ==
=== Director ===
The department is managed by the Director of Transportation, a position appointed by the Mayor of Seattle and confirmed by a majority vote from the Seattle City Council. The position is subject to re-appointment and re-confirmation every four years.

Since 1997, nine people have held the office of Director of Transportation. Greg Spotts was nominated in 2022 for the position.

Name	Tenure	Mayor(s)
Daryl Grigsby	1997–2002	Norm Rice, Paul Schell
Grace Crunican	2002–2009	Greg Nickels
Peter Hahn	2010–2013	Michael McGinn
Goran Sparrman (acting)	2014	Ed Murray
Scott Kubly	2014-2018	Ed Murray
Goran Sparrman (acting)	2018	Jenny Durkan
Linea Laird (acting)	2018–2019	Jenny Durkan
Sam Zimbabwe	2019–2021	Jenny Durkan
Kristen Simpson	2022	Bruce Harrell
Greg Spotts	2022–	Bruce Harrell

== Funding ==
In 2015, SDOT had an adopted budget of $429 million. The largest portion of the budget, approximately $186 million, is allocated to major capital projects, including collaborations with regional and state agencies.

=== Transportation levies ===
Much of SDOT's long-term funding comes from voter-approved funding levies and other taxes. In 2006, the $365 million "Bridging the Gap" levy was approved by Seattle voters, using property taxes and parking fees to fund nine years of transportation improvements. The levy was replaced in 2015 by the voter-approved "Move Seattle" levy, funded by a new property tax, that will provide $930 million over a nine-year period.

== Programs ==
=== Seattle Streetcar ===
SDOT maintains the citywide streetcar network, which consists of two lines, as of 2016: the South Lake Union Streetcar, opened in 2007; and the First Hill Streetcar, opened in 2016.

=== Transit funding ===
In addition to road funding, SDOT also provides funding for public transit improvements through partner agencies. The 2015 "Move Seattle" levy includes funding for expansion of King County Metro's RapidRide system into Seattle, replacing existing bus routes.

=== Cycling infrastructure ===
Since the passage of "Bridging the Gap" levy in 2006, SDOT has funded $36 million in bicycle infrastructure, including 129 miles (208 km) of bicycle lanes and sharrows, 98 miles (158 km) of signed bicycle routes, and 2,230 bicycle parking spaces. A bikeshare system, Pronto Cycle Share, debuted in 2014 and was initially operated by a non-profit organization until it ran into financial issues a year later. SDOT took over operations until the system was shut down in early 2017. It was replaced with a permitting system for private companies operating dockless bikeshare that launched in 2017. The permitting system was expanded beyond its initial pilot to several companies with bicycles distributed across the city; dockless scooter-sharing was allowed beginning in 2019.

=== Autonomous vehicles ===
In November 2022, SDOT introduced a permitting system for autonomous vehicle operators in the city that would allow them to use public streets with a driver. Zoox, Nvidia, and Cruise have since begun testing their vehicles in the city.

== Facilities ==
As of 2015, SDOT has an estimated $20 billion in transportation assets within the city of Seattle. It maintains 3,954 miles (6,363 km) of streets, 122 bridges, 609 stairways, 158 traffic cameras, 1,061 signalized intersections, and 29,073 curb ramps. The Urban Forestry division maintains over 41,000 street trees, as well as 110 acres (45 ha) of managed landscape areas.
