= Denny Triangle, Seattle =

Neighborhood in Seattle

Denny Triangle
- Neighborhood
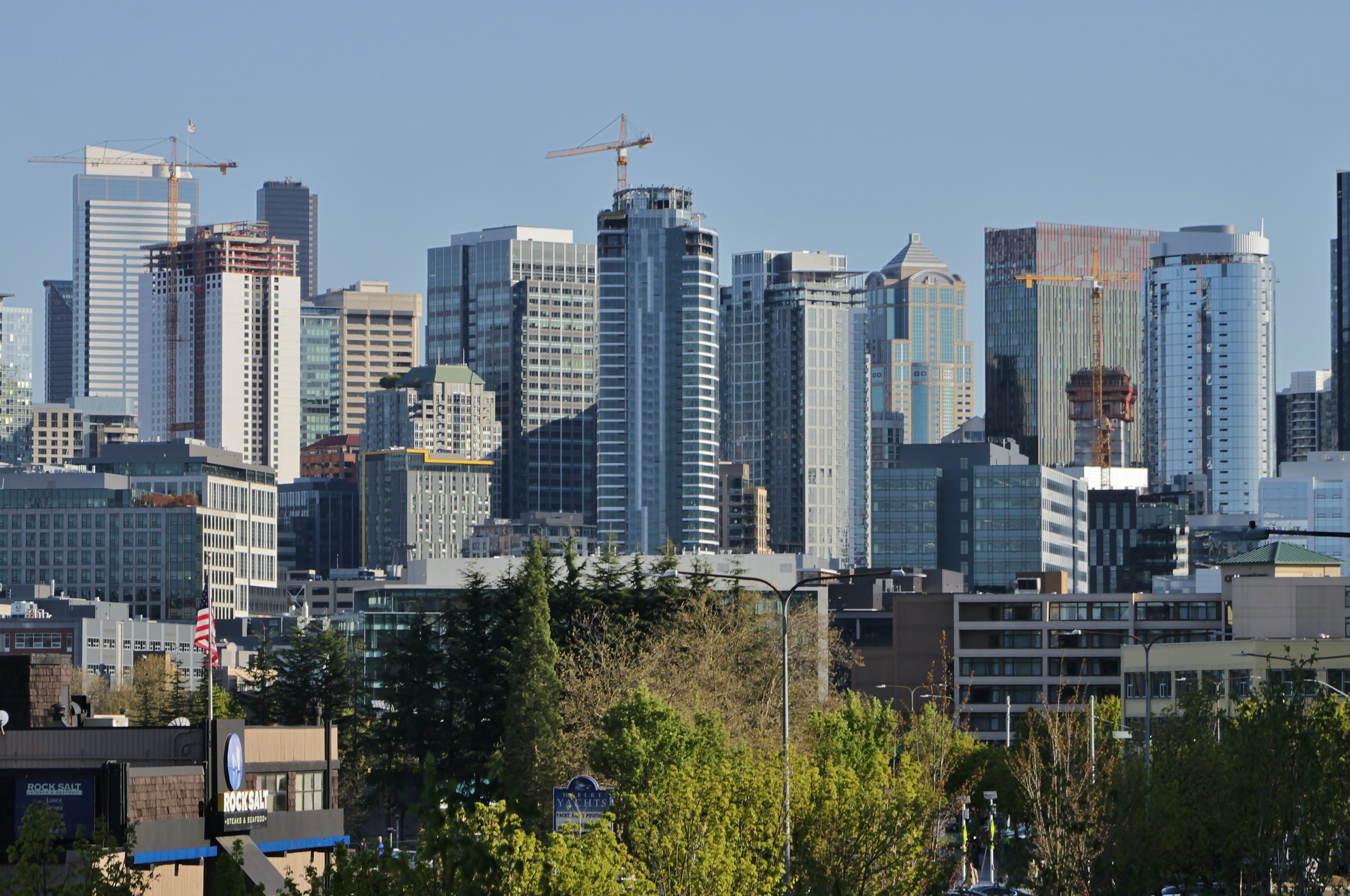
- Denny Triangle and South Lake Union skyline in 2018

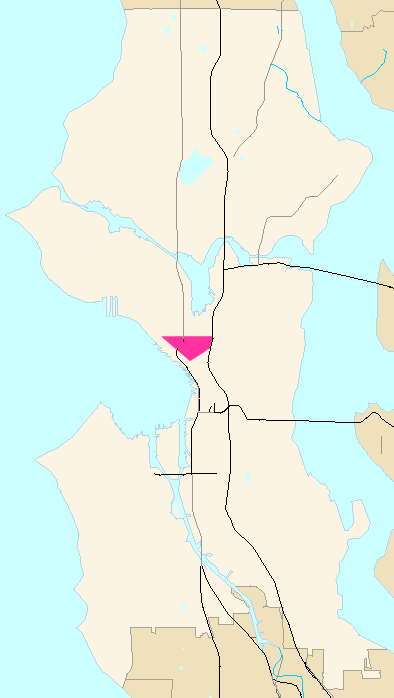
- Denny Triangle Highlighted in Pink
- Coordinates: 47°37′00″N 122°20′24″W
- Country: United States
- State: Washington
- County: King
- City: Seattle
- ZIP Code: 98101, 98121
- Area Code: 206, 564

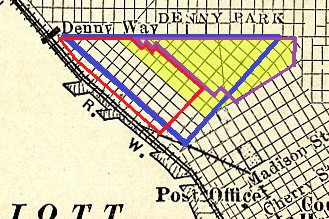
Differing definitions of the neighborhood borders: the yellow background follows the Seattle City Clerk's Neighborhood Map Atlas. The blue border shows "Belltown (Denny Regrade)" as defined by northwestplaces.com. The red border shows "Belltown" and the purple border shows "Denny Triangle", as defined by downtownseattle.com.

The Denny Triangle is a neighborhood in Seattle, Washington, United States, that stretches north of Downtown Seattle to the grounds of the Seattle Center. Its generally flat terrain was originally a steep hill, taken down as part of a mammoth construction project in the first decades of the 20th century known as the Denny Regrade, which is another name for the neighborhood on the regraded area. The name Denny Triangle, referring to the northeastern portion of this regrading project, is a term that has gained currency as this neighborhood has seen increasing development in the first decades of the 21st century.

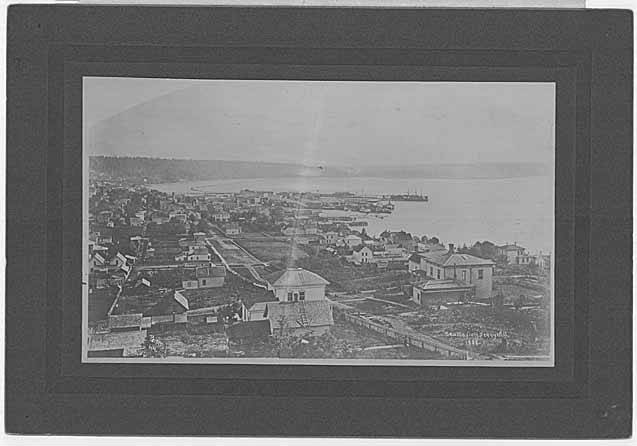
View of Seattle from Denny Hill in 1882 photograph by Theodore Peiser

As with most Seattle neighborhoods, the Denny Triangle has no formal borders. The Seattle City Clerk's Neighborhood Map Atlas (which is published by the city but does not have official status as defining neighborhoods) defines the Denny Regrade as bounded on the north by Denny Way, on the southwest by Third Avenue, on the southeast by Olive Way, with a small eastern border on Interstate 5. A 2009 map from northwestplaces.com treats the term "Denny Regrade" as synonymous with Belltown and shows both names as referring to a triangle bounded on the north by Denny Way, on the southwest by Western Avenue (two blocks inland of the Central Waterfront), and on the southeast by Stewart Street; the southern tip of this triangle falls in the northern part of Pike Place Market. A map on downtownseattle.com agrees on the northern boundary at Denny Way, but splits this area into "Belltown" and the Denny Triangle and gives both a less regular shape. They divide Belltown to the southwest from the Denny Triangle to the northeast, with the border running mainly along Fifth Avenue but including a small number of properties along Denny Way west of Fifth Avenue as being in the Denny Triangle. They mark the southwest border of Belltown as a block closer to the water (Elliott Avenue) and draw a more ragged southeast border: west of Fifth Avenue, Belltown extends south only to Lenora Street, while east of Fifth Avenue the Denny Triangle is bounded in its westernmost block by Virginia Street and (once it crosses Westlake Avenue) by Olive Way, and with an eastern border on the same small piece of Interstate 5 as the City Clerk's map.

== Denny Hill ==
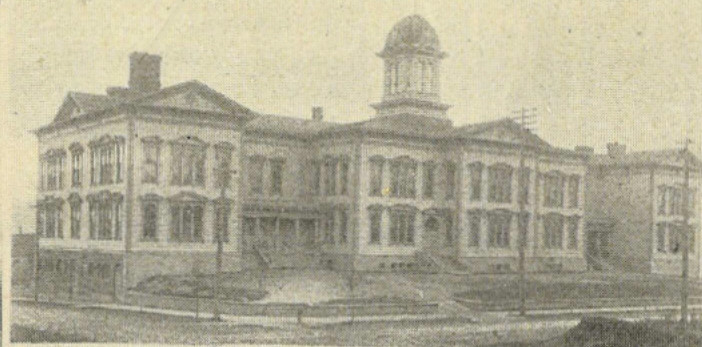
The 1884 Denny School (depicted here in 1900) on Battery Street between Fifth & Sixth Avenues was demolished in 1928, one of many major buildings demolished as part of the regrade project.

Seattle is located on an isthmus between Lake Washington on the east and Puget Sound on the west. The north-south orientation of the lake and of the city's many hills is the result of glaciation. The terrain was first gouged by south-moving glaciers, and when they retreated, was marked by mounds of rock debris left in their wake. Denny and Queen Anne Hills are two of those north of what is now downtown Seattle. Denny Hill was removed in a series of regrades beginning in 1898 and ending in 1930.

== Regrading projects ==
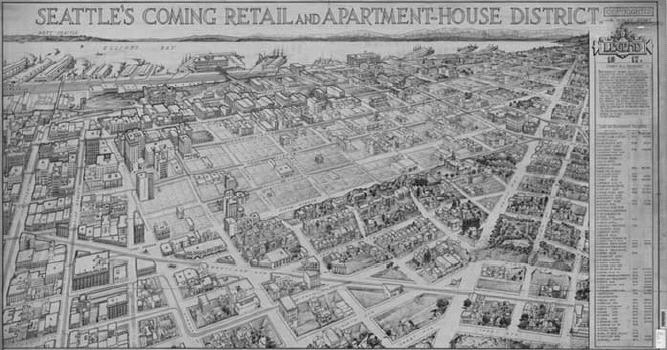
Idealized bird's-eye view of the area in 1917, between Denny Regrade No. 1 and Denny Regrade No. 2. The major street running roughly horizontally in foreground is Westlake Avenue. The major street headed into the distance at right is Denny Way. Fifth Avenue marked the line between Denny Regrade No. 1 and Denny Regrade No. 2.

The Denny Regrade project was the removal of Denny Hill, one of the proverbial seven hills of Seattle. It ran east from First Avenue between Pike Street and Denny Way. Hill and street were named after the Denny family, who were among the city's earliest white inhabitants. The First Avenue regrade was started in 1897 and completed on January 6, 1899. From 1902 to 1911, the hill was sluiced into Elliott Bay by pumping water from Lake Union using hydraulic mining techniques, in a series of regrades along Pike and Pine Streets, Second Avenue, and the massive Denny Regrade No. 1 which regraded everything remaining between Fifth Avenue and the waterfront. In 1929–30, Denny Regrade No. 2 removed the final pieces of the hill east of Fifth Avenue using steam shovels.

== Photographs ==
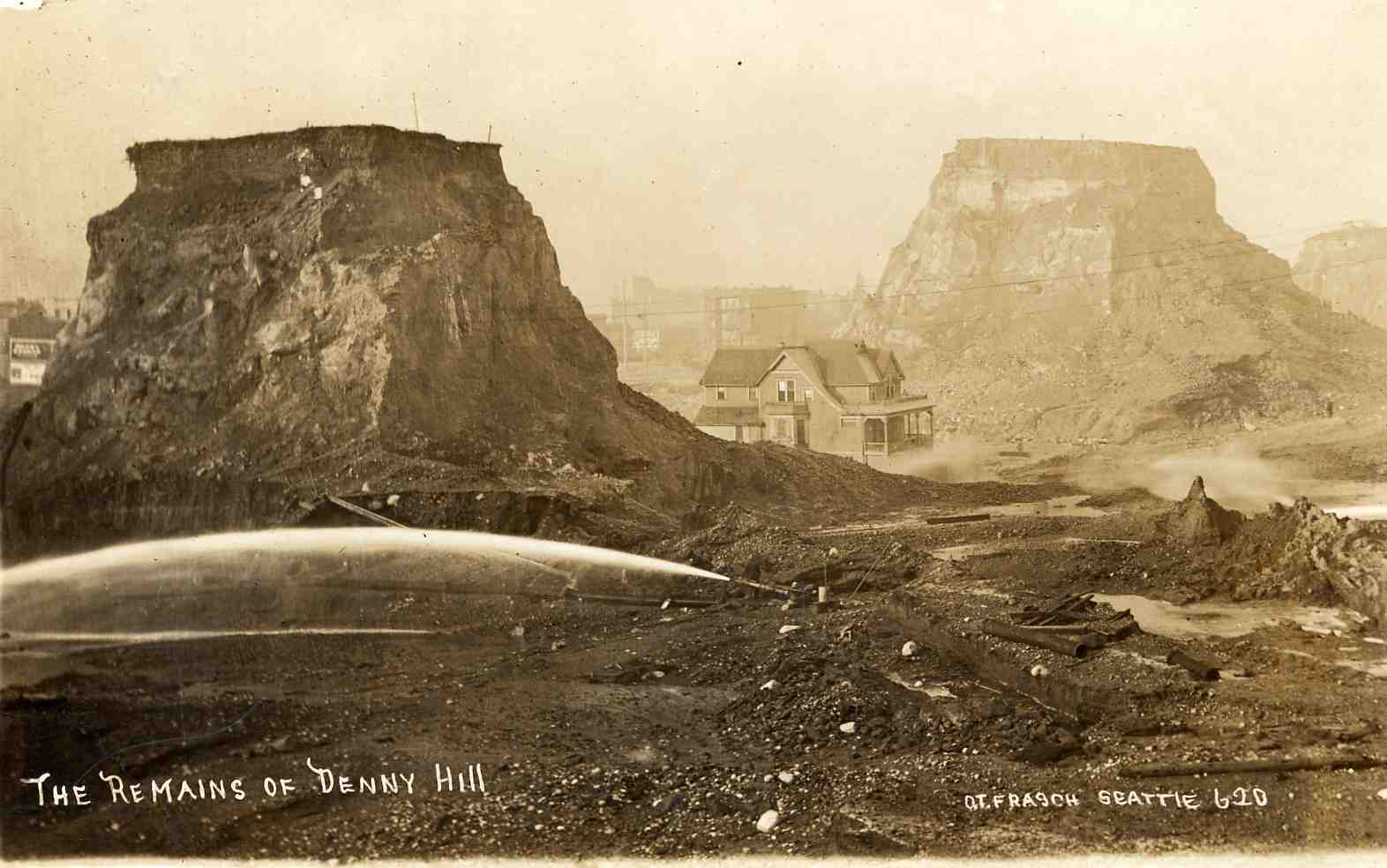
Postcard of the 1902–1911 regrade

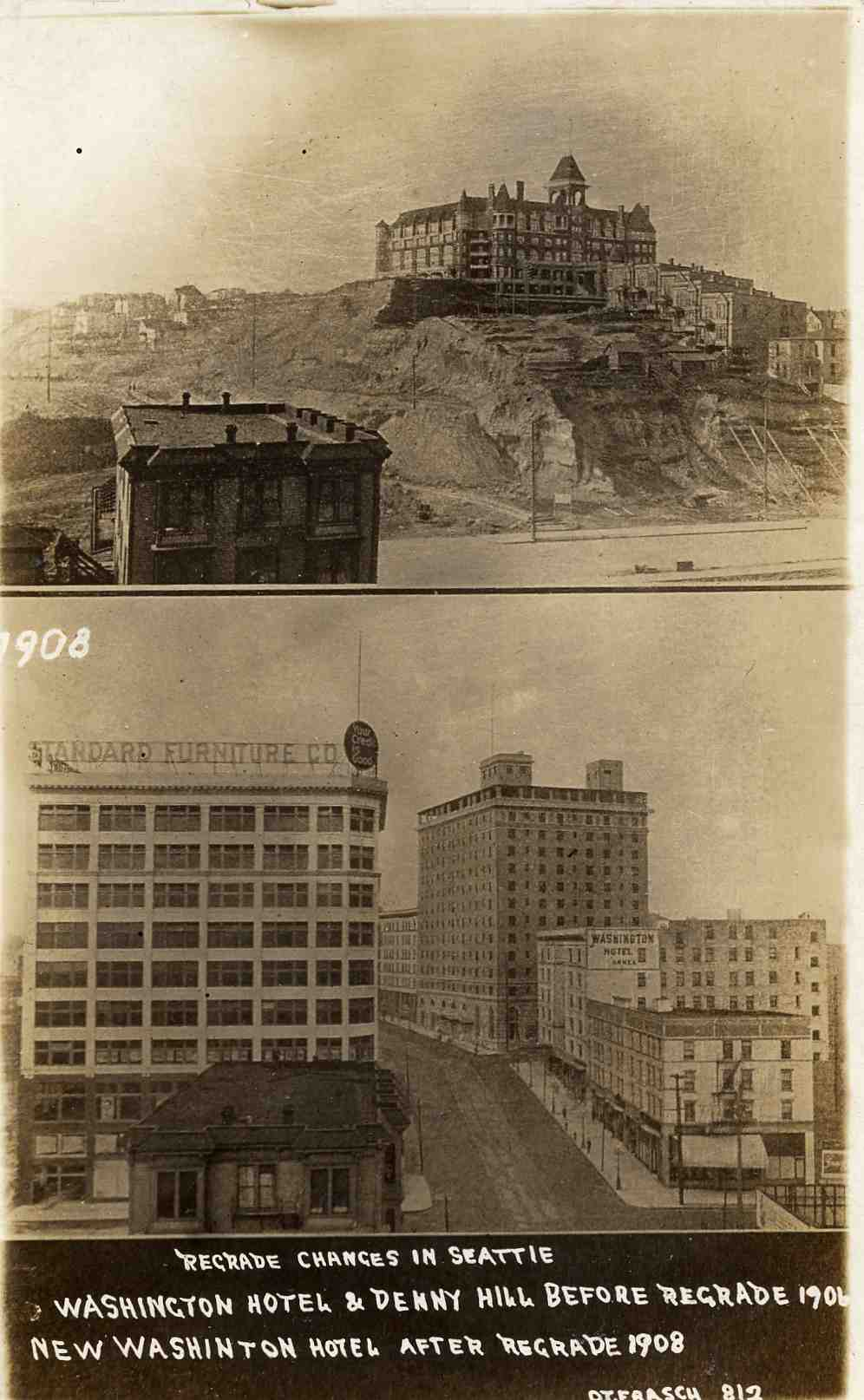
Postcard of the 1902–1911 regrade

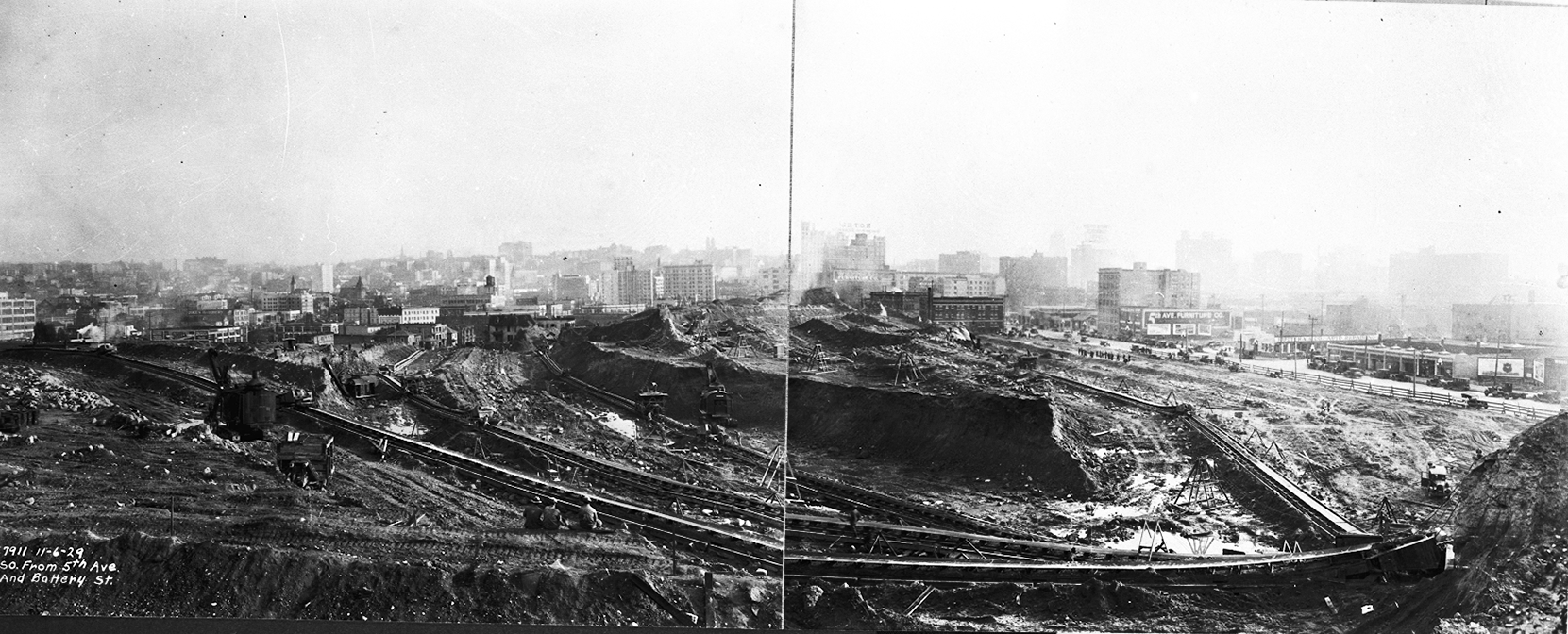
November 1929 photo of the last regrade, in progress

== See also ==
- Eugene McAllaster, Denny Regrade consulting engineer
- Regrading
