= 206 Burger Company =

Restaurant chain in Seattle, Washington, U.S.

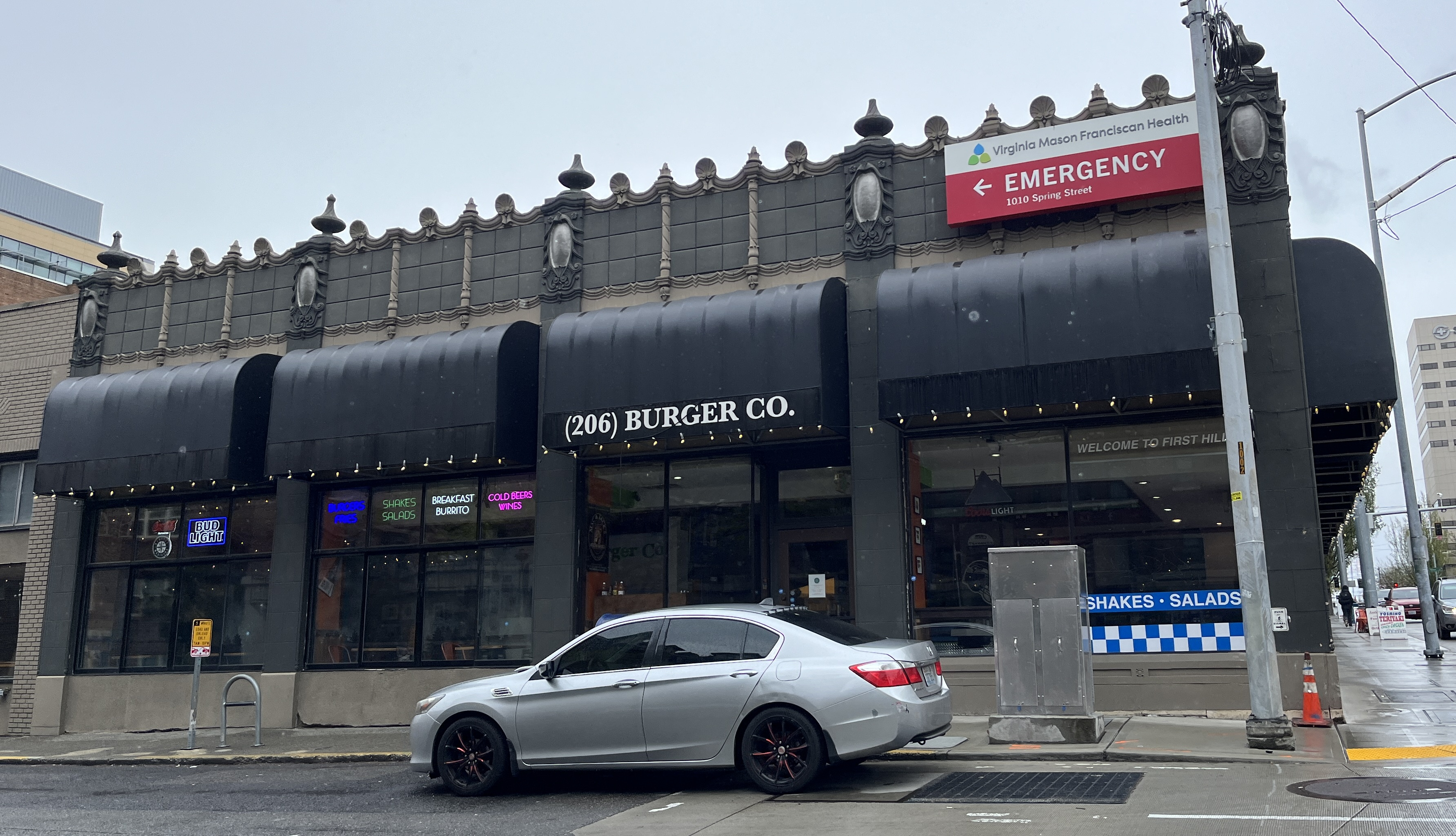
- Exterior of the First Hill restaurant in 2024

Restaurant information
- Established: 2014
- Owner: Suren Shretha
- Location: Seattle, King, Washington, United States

206 Burger Company is a small chain of fast casual restaurants in Seattle, in the U.S. state of Washington. Established by Suren Shretha in 2014, the business has operated three locations, in downtown Seattle as well as the First Hill and Queen Anne neighborhoods.

== Description ==
206 Burger Company is a small chain of fast casual restaurants based in Seattle, Washington. The business has operated three restaurants: one at the Marion Food Court in downtown Seattle, and others in the First Hill and Queen Anne neighborhoods. According to Eater Seattle, the restaurant has an "extensive" menu of burgers named after local sports teams, as well as sandwiches, milkshakes, and options with masala. Among burgers is a bacon cheeseburger. Locations display sports memorabilia. The menu has included a masala-spiced chicken sandwich, an Oreo milkshake, French fries, and a special sauce. The Queen Anne location has expanded seating and a full-service bar.

== History ==
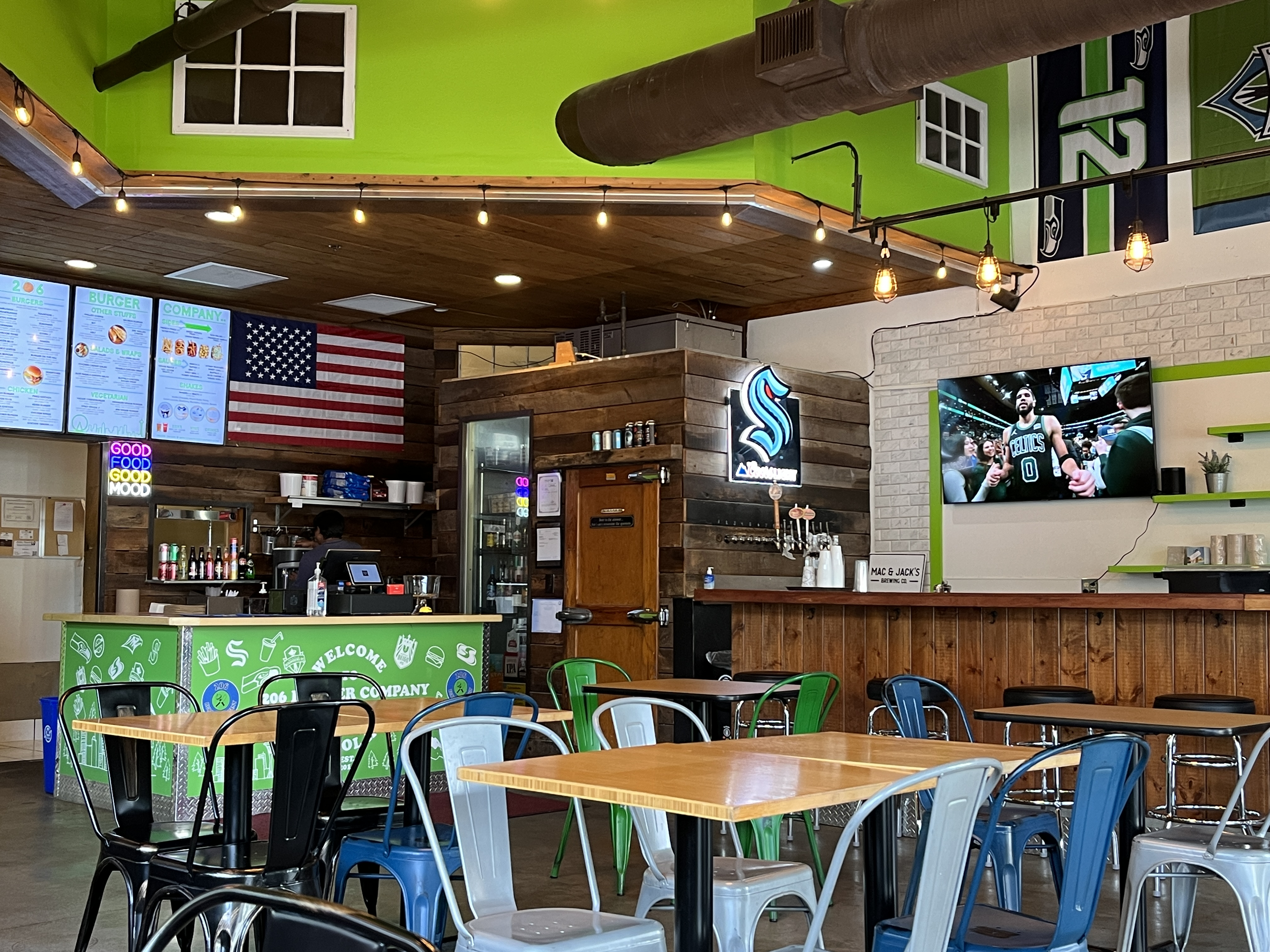
Interior of the restaurant on Broadway, 2024

Owner Suren Shretha opened the first restaurant in 2014, and his family helps operate the chain. The Queen Anne location opened as the chain's third restaurant in c. 2019. Like many restaurants, 206 Burger Company operated via delivery and take-out at times during the COVID-19 pandemic. The Capitol Hill location opened on Broadway in 2024, in the space that previously housed a 8oz Burger & Co restaurant.

== Reception ==
Aimee Rizzo of The Infatuation said, "206 Burger Company is the best burger spot that nobody's talking about. Not only are the classics excellent here, but the milkshakes are perfect (get the Oreo), the fries strike the ideal balance between crispy and floppy, and the special sauce is kind of smoky." In 2018, she included the business in the website's 2018 overview of the best restaurants in First Hill. She and Kayla Sager-Riley also included 206 Burger in a 2025 list of Seattle's thirteen best breakfast sandwiches.

== See also ==
- List of hamburger restaurants
- List of restaurant chains in the United States
