= R+M Dessert Bar =

Bakery and dessert shop in Seattle, Washington, U.S.

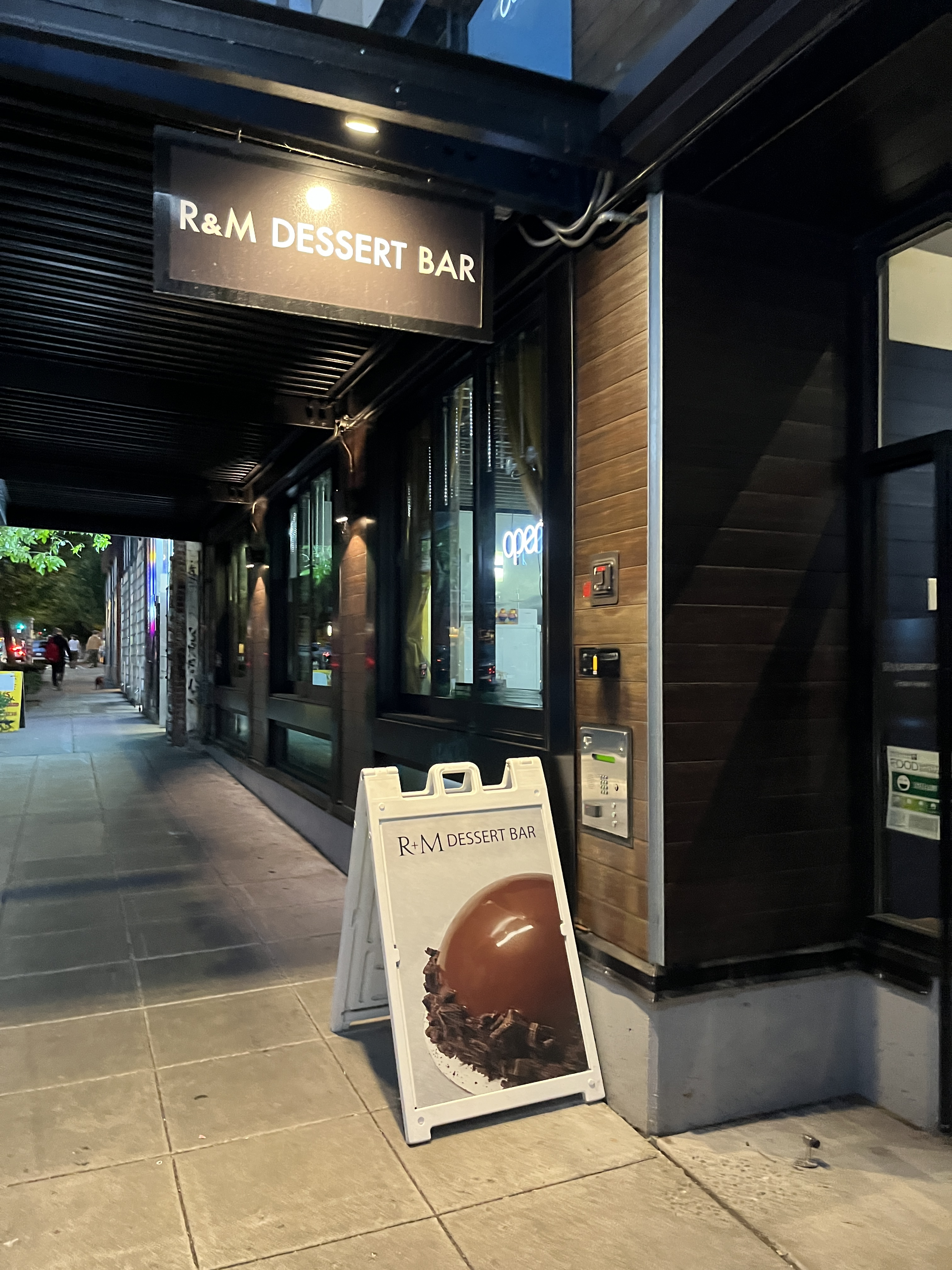
- Exterior, 2024
- Interactive map of R+M Dessert Bar

Restaurant information
- Established: November 2017
- Owners: Marc Adams; Rod Gambassi
- Location: 601 E Pike Street, Seattle, King, Washington, 98122, United States
- Coordinates: 47.6139°N 122.3242°W

R+M Dessert Bar (sometimes R and M Dessert Bar or R&M Dessert Bar) is a bakery and dessert shop on Pike Street, at the southern edge of Seattle's Capitol Hill, in the First Hill neighborhood. Co-chefs, co-owners, and spouses Marc Adams and Rod Gambassi opened the shop in 2017.

== Description ==
The small bakery and dessert shop R+M Dessert Bar operates in the lobby of a glass apartment complex called Cove at the intersection of Pike Street and Belmont Avenue at the southern edge of Capitol Hill, in First Hill. The interior has a few tables, gray walls, and accents such as stuffed birds and sparkly pillows. The shop has a glass case housing pastries and desserts such as banana bread, bread pudding, carrot cake, chocolate truffle cakes, clafoutis, French macarons, Japanese cheesecake, pound cake, tarts, tiramisu, tres leches cake, and other baked goods.

Tart varieties have included key lime, mango-guava, and passionfruit. Among dairy-free and gluten-free options is a citrus cake. The shop's savory options include a zucchini bake, described as a quiche without the crust and souffle, served with arugula, homemade granola, and red wine–pickled onion.

The changing menu's various options reflect the co-owners' diverse backgrounds. R+M Dessert Bar stays open late on weekends and also sells wine. The LGBTQ-owned shop has a mezzanine level for private events and a walk-up window with a limited menu of take-out options.

== History ==
Co-chefs, co-owners, and spouses Marc Adams and Rod Gambassi opened the shop in November 2017. The couple operates on the shop on their own and some of the recipes come from their grandmothers.

== Reception ==
In 2018, Aimee Rizzo included R+M in The Infatuation's overview of the ten best eateries in Seattle for late-night dessert, The Stranger included the business in a list of the city's best restaurants for sweets. Chelsea Lin of Seattle Magazine said the tarts are "easily the best thing on the menu" and wrote, "though you can detect the owners' lack of professional training in some of the finesse, Gambassi and Adams are providing delicious competition for the likes of Hot Cakes, Pie Bar and the neighborhood’s plentiful ice cream shops".

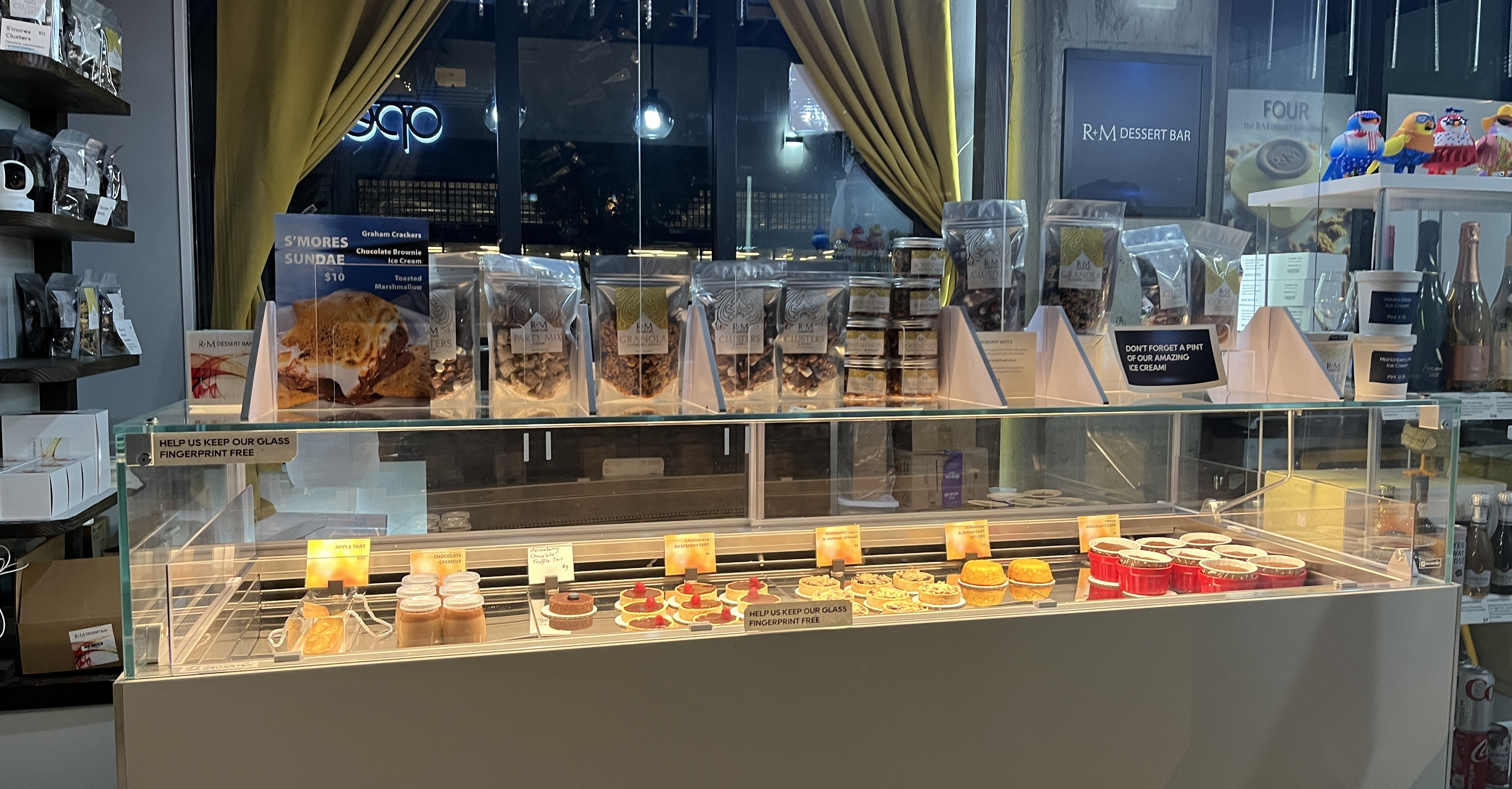
Interior

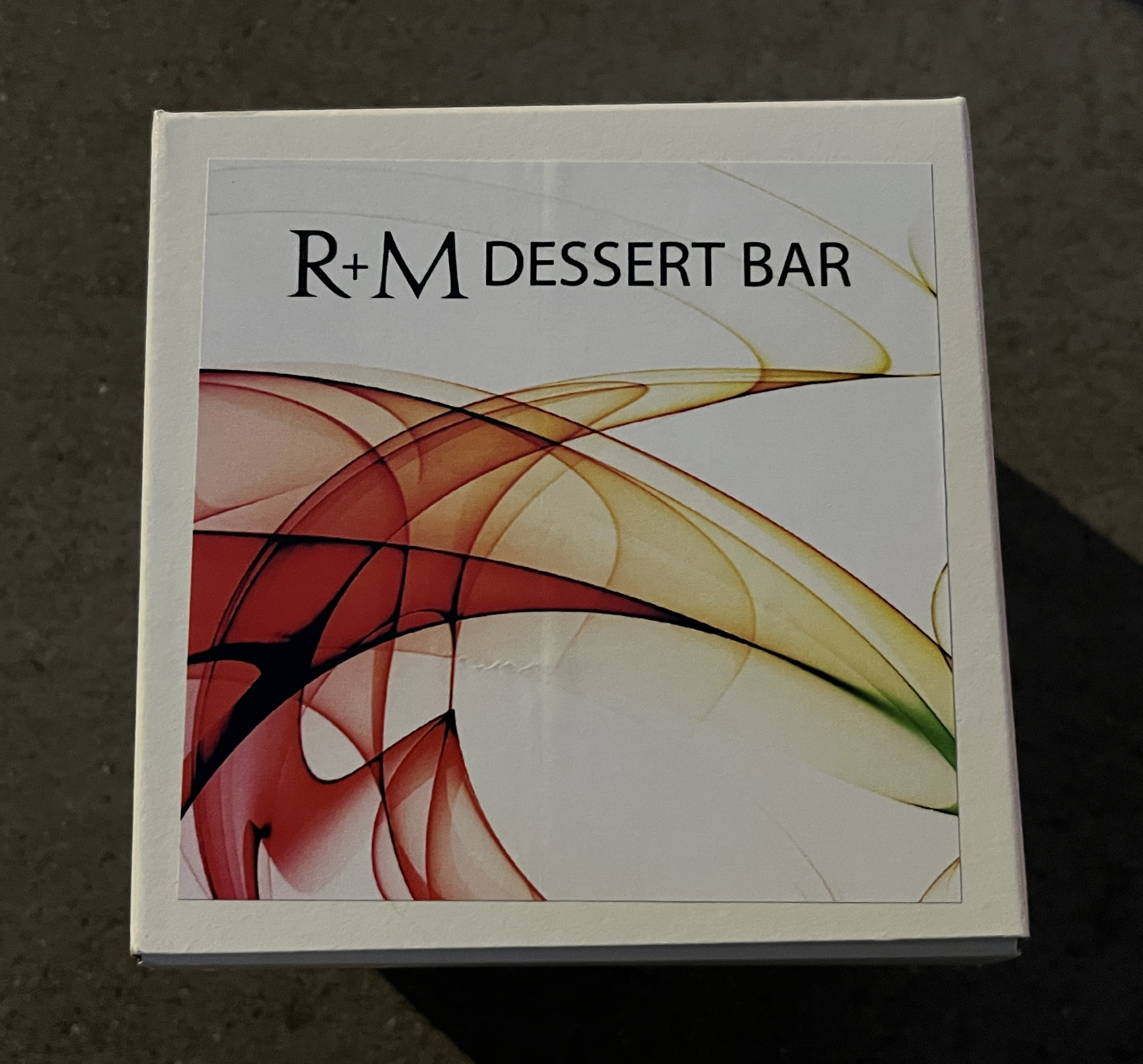
Branded box

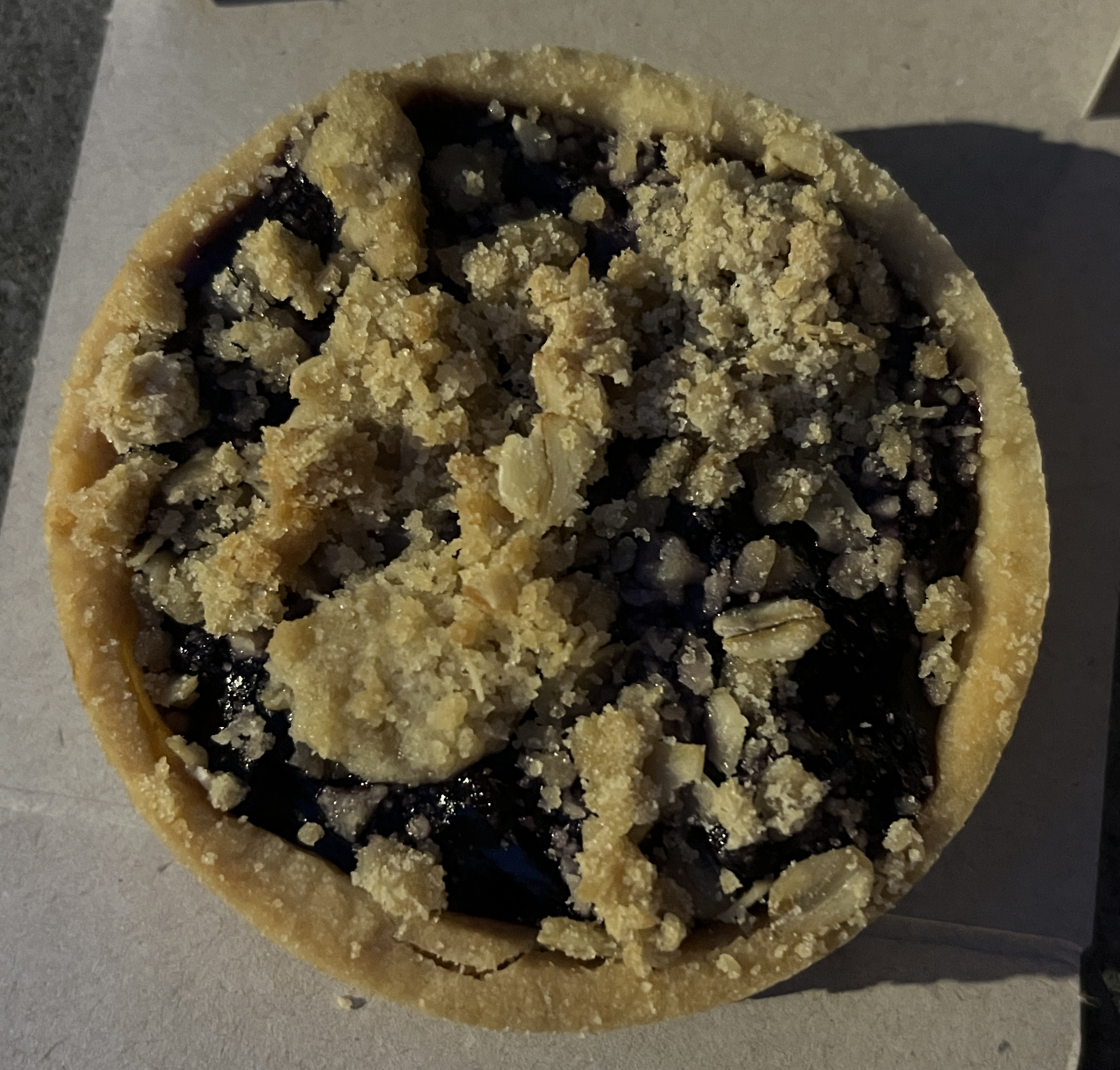
Blueberry tart

== See also ==
- List of bakeries
- LGBTQ culture in Seattle
