= HoneyHole Sandwiches =

Restaurant in Seattle, Washington, U.S.

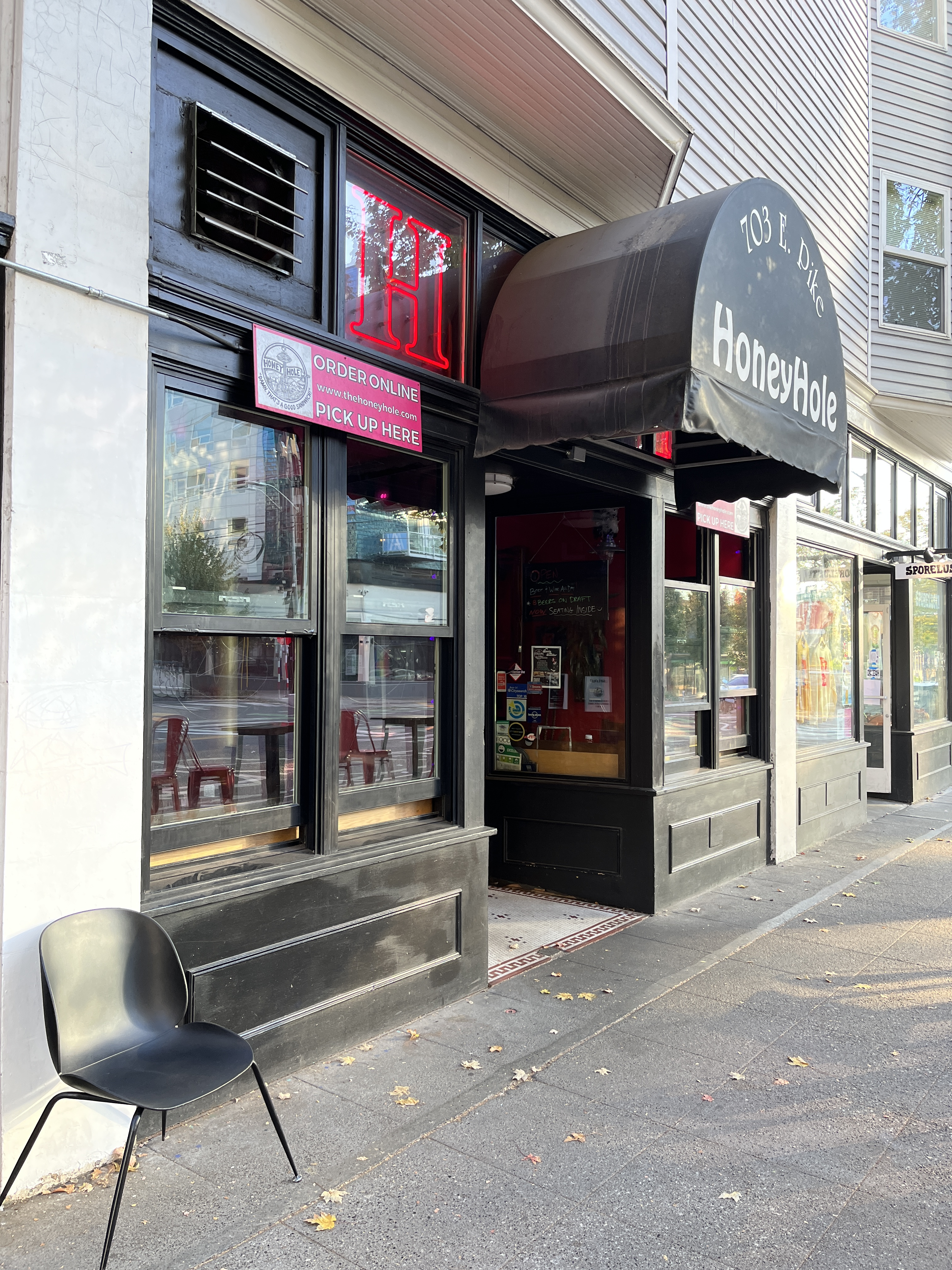
- Exterior of the restaurant on Pike Street, Capitol Hill, 2022
- Interactive map of HoneyHole Sandwiches

Restaurant information
- Established: 1999
- Owner: Travis Rosenthal
- Previous owners: Devon London; Sean London; Hannah Roberts; Kristin and Patrick Rye; Evan Bramer
- Location: Seattle, King, Washington, United States
- Coordinates: 47.6140°N 122.3232°W
- Website: www.honeyholeseattle.com

HoneyHole Sandwiches is a sandwich restaurant in Seattle, in the U.S. state of Washington. Established in 1999, the business closed in October 2023, before being relaunched in 2024.

Previously, HoneyHole operated an outpost that rebranded as Beck's Bar and Grill.

== Description ==
HoneyHole Sandwiches is a sandwich restaurant on Pike Street, on Seattle's Capitol Hill. Previously, the business operated a second location on Jefferson in the First Hill / Central District area. Seattle Metropolitan has described the Pike location as a "jolly alt dive".

The restaurant has hot and cold sandwiches, as well as sides such as French fries, coleslaw, potato salad, and a house salad. The menu has sandwiches named Emilio Pestovez and the Texas Tease, which has shredded barbecue chicken. The Buford T. Justice has pork and pineapple, the Daytripper has hummus, and the Pilgrim has been marketed as "Thanksgiving dinner on a roll". The Built to Satisfy is a classic BLT.

== History ==
Established in 1999, the restaurant was founded by brothers Sean and Devon London; Hannah Roberts was also a co-owner. Kristin and Patrick Rye purchased the business in 2021.

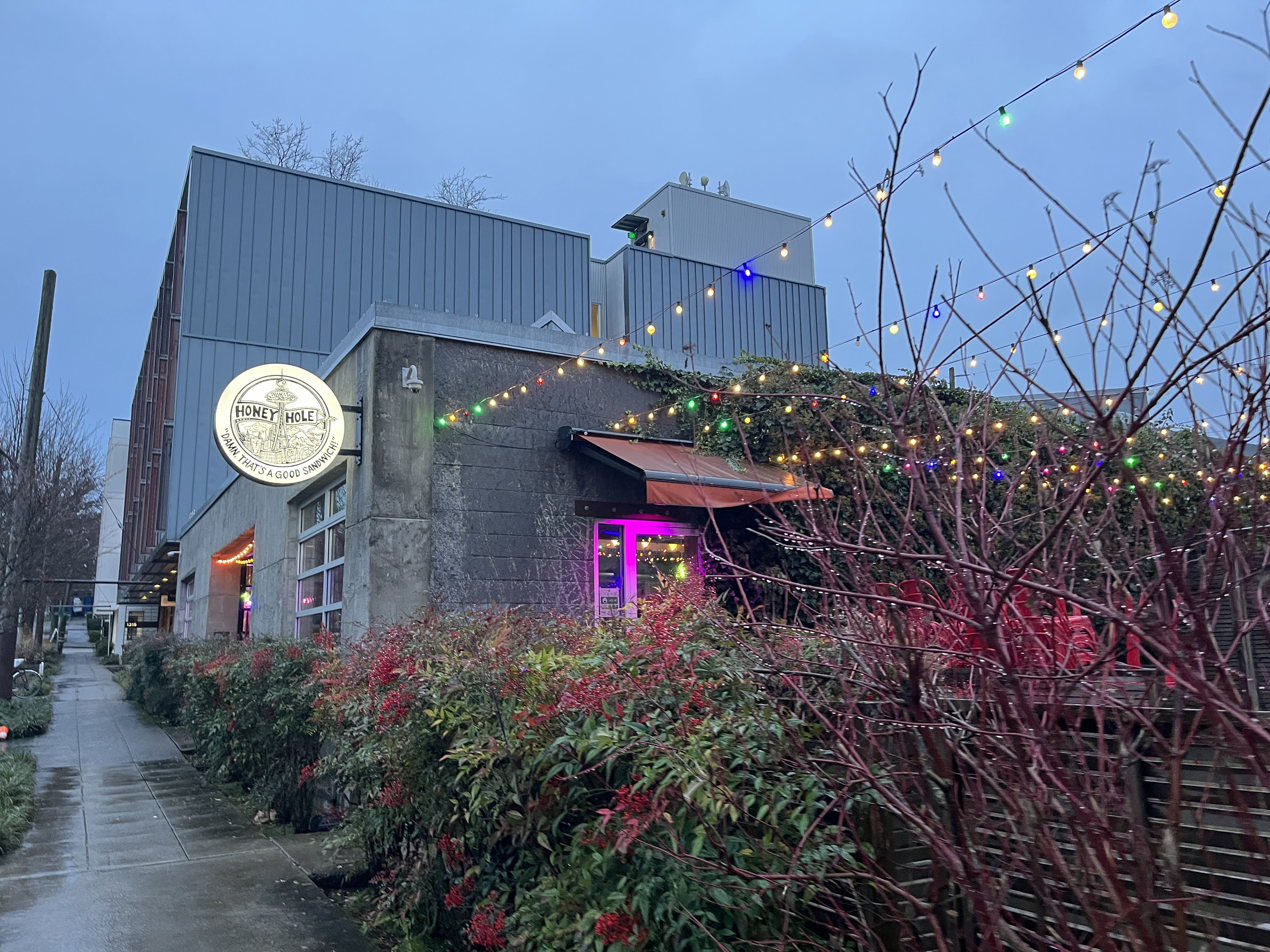
Exterior of the outpost in January 2023

The 4,000-square-foot outpost opened in 2021, adding 30 employees. It later closed and was replaced by Beck's Bar and Grill.

In May 2023 former employees alleged that there had been paycheck irregularities and late payment, in addition to a toxic work environment under the management of Kristin Rye. The couple sold the business to general manager Evan Bramer in August 2023.

On October 31, 2023, Bramer was reported to have disappeared, leaving employees unpaid and unsupported. Travis Rosenthal reopened the Capitol Hill shop in March 2024.

== Reception ==
HoneyHole won in the Best Sandwich category of Seattle Magazine's annual readers' poll in 2018. The business was included in the Daily Hive's 2021 list of Seattle's best sandwich eateries. Caitlin Flynn included HoneyHole in Eat This, Not That's 2022 list of "The Best Spot to Get a BLT in Every State".

== See also ==
- Sandwich bar
