= Quinn's Pub =

Restaurant in Seattle, Washington, U.S.

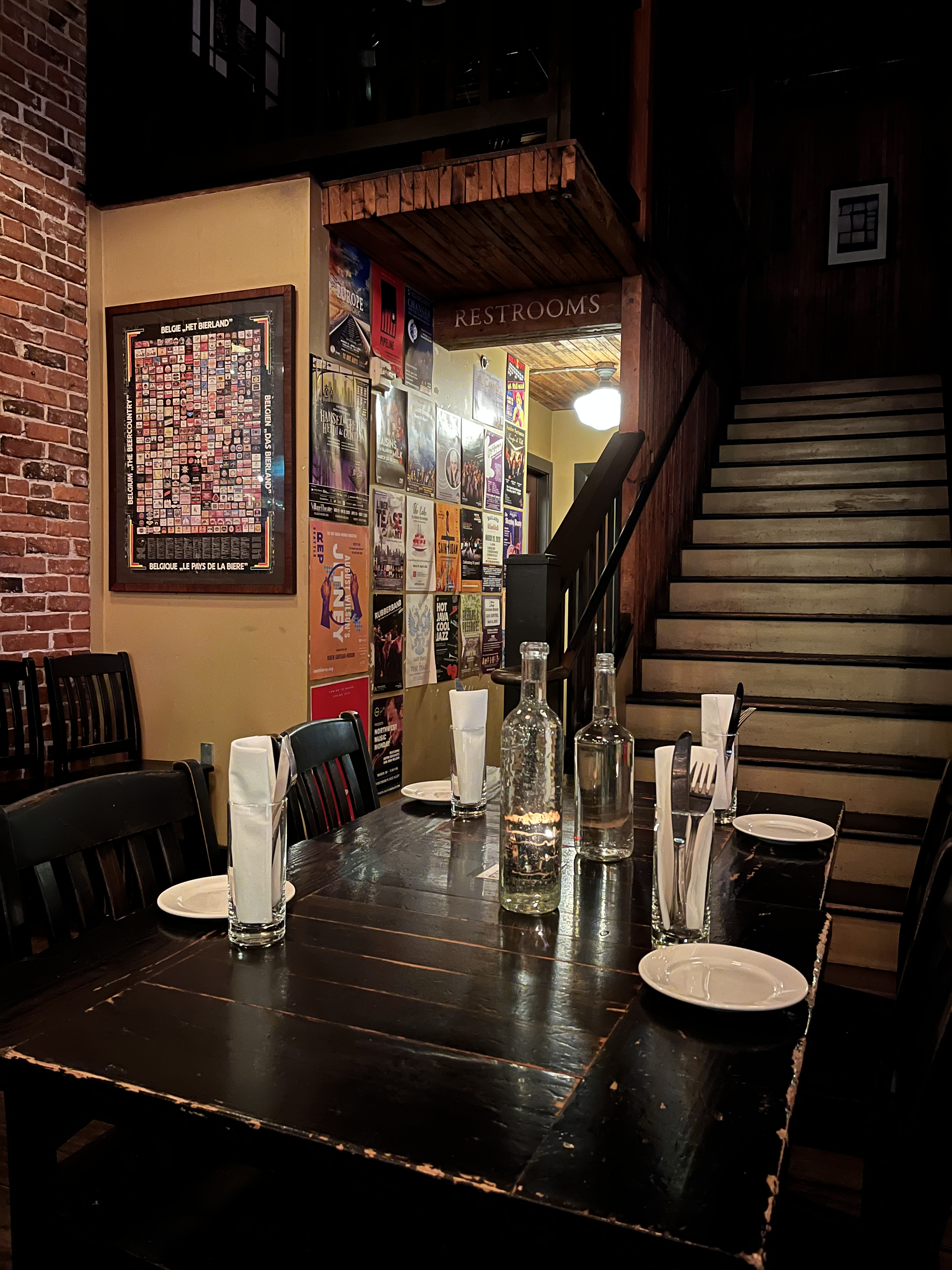
- The restaurant's interior, 2022
- Interactive map of Quinn's Pub

Restaurant information
- Established: 2007
- Owners: Charles and Peter Kim
- Previous owners: Scott and Heather Staples
- Food type: American; New American
- Location: 1001 East Pike Street, Seattle, King, Washington, 98122, United States
- Coordinates: 47.6140°N 122.31922°W
- Website: quinnspubseattle.com

Quinn's Pub is a restaurant on Seattle's Capitol Hill, in the U.S. state of Washington. Spouses Scott and Heather Staples opened the gastropub in 2007, with the former also serving as chef. Brothers Charles and Peter Kim became the owners of Quinn's in 2018.

== Description ==
Named after the original owners' son, Quinn's Pub operates at the intersection of 10th and Pike Street on Seattle's Capitol Hill. The two-story, upscale restaurant serves comfort food and American / New American cuisine. According to Seattle Refined, Quinn's was inspired by the gastropubs of London during the 1990s.

=== Menu ===
The menu includes buffalo-fried frog legs, a burger, grilled Vermont quail, and a Scotch egg. The gastropub has also served foie gras poutine, grilled chicken, slow-roasted pork ribs, braised oxtail, grilled giant Pacific octopus, potato gnocchi, and wild boar sloppy joes. Other food options include meatball sliders, seared tuna with navy beans and sautéed chanterelles, cod fritters, fish and chips, French fries with fontina and veal, a pretzel, and a tart salad.

Drink options include beer (bottles and draught) as well as cider, bourbons, and whiskeys. The restaurant has hosted happy hour.

== History ==
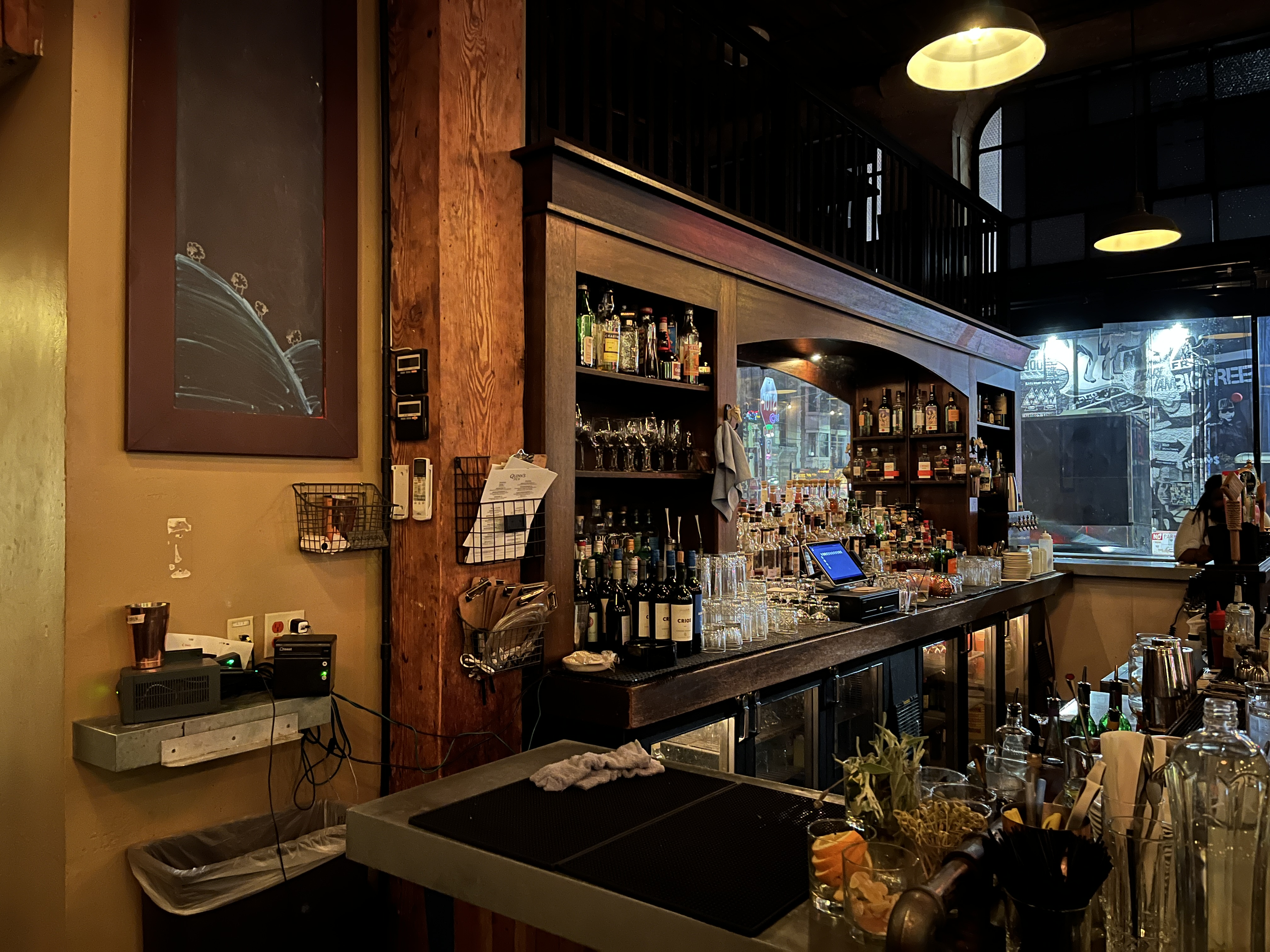
Interior bar in 2022

The restaurant opened in 2007. Scott Staples was the chef; he and his wife Heather were co-owners. Quinn's offered approximately 60 types of beer, as of 2009.

Jeremy Ravetz was named the chef de cuisine and general manager in late 2011. In 2012, Seattle Magazine's Anna Samuels wrote, "In the past year, Ravetz has infused the existing pub-fare menu with gourmet techniques, resulting in rustic dishes that toe the fine line between pretension and comfort food, such as Quinn's famous Scotch egg. Since adding general manager to his list of titles last May, Ravetz has been instrumental in a bevy of new projects, including the pub's flagship brew, Quinn's Tap, introduced last summer and a charcuterie operation planned for early next year."

Quinn's participated in Seattle Beer Week in 2012. In 2013, the business announced plans to start serving lunch and participate in the city's "parklet" program for sidewalk dining. For the Capitol Hill Block Party in 2013, the restaurant offered jello shots (lime, orange, and raspberry), as well as beer and rum drink specials.

Brothers Charles and Peter Kim became owners of the restaurant in 2018. Quinn's has since been described as an Asian-owned business.

== Reception ==
In a 2013 episode of the Travel Channel series The Layover, Anthony Bourdain said of Quinn's: "They do great (burgers). There's great local beers and the delightful wild boar sloppy joe, which is something they tell me you just gotta do." Eater Seattle included the wild board sloppy joes in a 2014 list of twelve "iconic Seattle meat dishes to try before you die".

== See also ==
- List of New American restaurants
