= Madison Street (Seattle) =

Street in Seattle, Washington

- Maintained by: Seattle Department of Transportation
- Length: 3.6 mi (5.8 km)
- Location: Seattle
- South end: Alaskan Way in Downtown Seattle
- Major junctions: Interstate 5, Broadway, Pike Street, Pine Street
- East end: 43rd Avenue in Madison Park

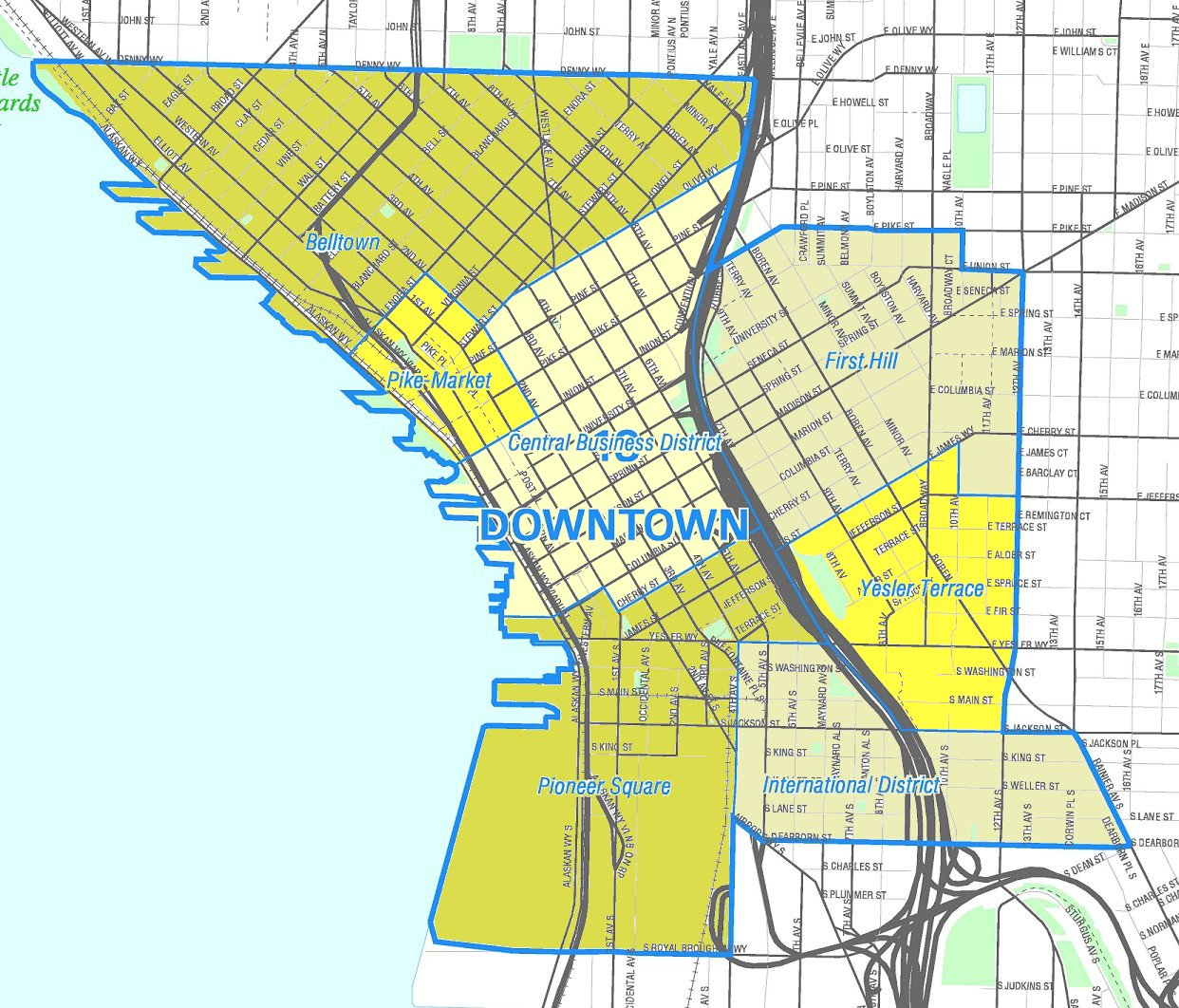
Madison Street is the central road running northeast through First Hill.

Madison Street is a major thoroughfare of Seattle, Washington. The street originates at Alaskan Way on the Seattle waterfront, and heads northeast through Downtown Seattle, First Hill, Capitol Hill, Madison Valley, Washington Park, and Madison Park, ending just east of 43rd Avenue East on Lake Washington. From Broadway to Lake Washington, the street is known as East Madison Street, which accounts for most of its length. It is the only Seattle street that runs uninterrupted from the salt water of Puget Sound in the west to the fresh water of Lake Washington in the east.

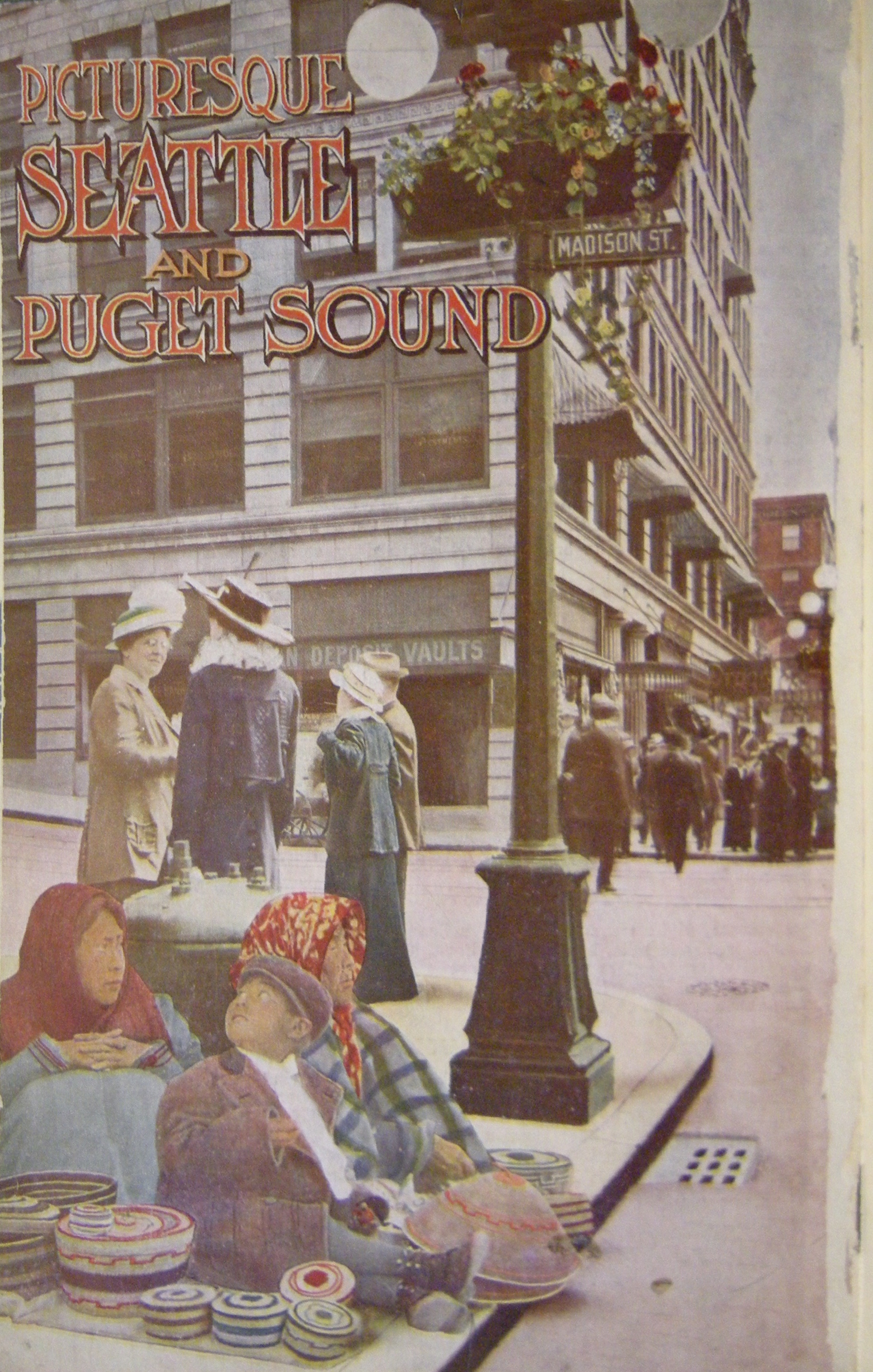
Madison street on a 1915 cover

Many notable buildings are located along the street, including the Seattle Central Library and numerous hotels such as the Sorrento Hotel. For most of the run from Broadway to 12th Avenue, it forms the northern boundary of the Seattle University campus.

== Public transportation ==
=== Cable car ===
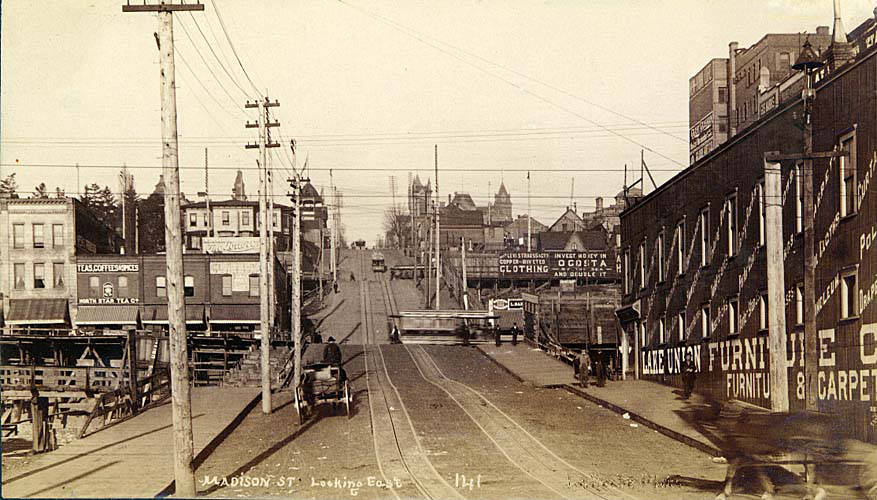
Looking east on Madison Street from Western Avenue circa 1891, showing cable car tracks

A cable car line provided public transportation along all or part of Madison Street from 1890 to 1940. It was constructed and operated by the Madison Street Cable Railway company. The original powerhouse, which powered the cables running under the streets, was located between 21st and 22nd Avenues, and the service was operated as two separate lines—west from the powerhouse to downtown and east from the powerhouse to Madison Park on Lake Washington and, together, the two lines served the entire length of Madison Street.

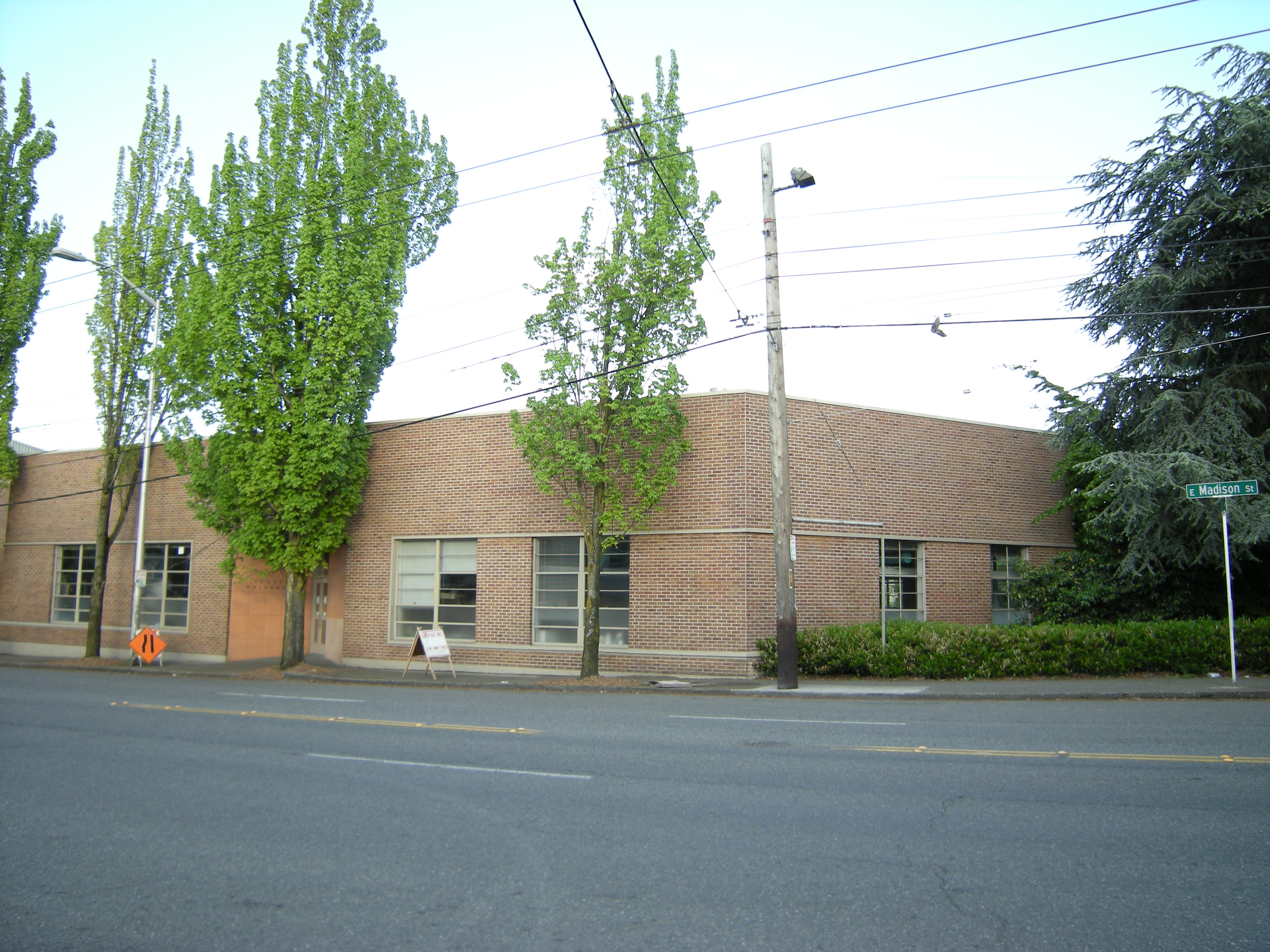
Former cable car house on the south side of Madison near 10th Avenue on Capitol Hill, later the Fine Arts Building of Seattle University

The western cable car line opened in spring 1890, and in downtown it terminated at a turntable on West Street (now Western Avenue), near the ferry terminal on Puget Sound. The line east from 21st to "Lake Washington and Madison Park" terminus opened in June 1891. In 1910, the line east from 21st was closed, replaced by electric streetcars. After the construction of a new powerhouse near 10th Avenue, the line from the downtown waterfront to 21st was cut back from the latter point to there in 1911, but the section between 10th and 14th was restored to operation in 1913. This left a 1.2-mile (1.9 km) line between the downtown waterfront and 14th Avenue, which could not be converted to streetcars because it included some sections with grades too steep for streetcars. It ran for the last time on April 13, 1940.

Electric streetcar service on East Madison Street (route 11) ended on January 10, 1940, temporarily replaced by motor buses until April 30, 1940, when trolleybuses began operating on route 11.

=== Bus ===
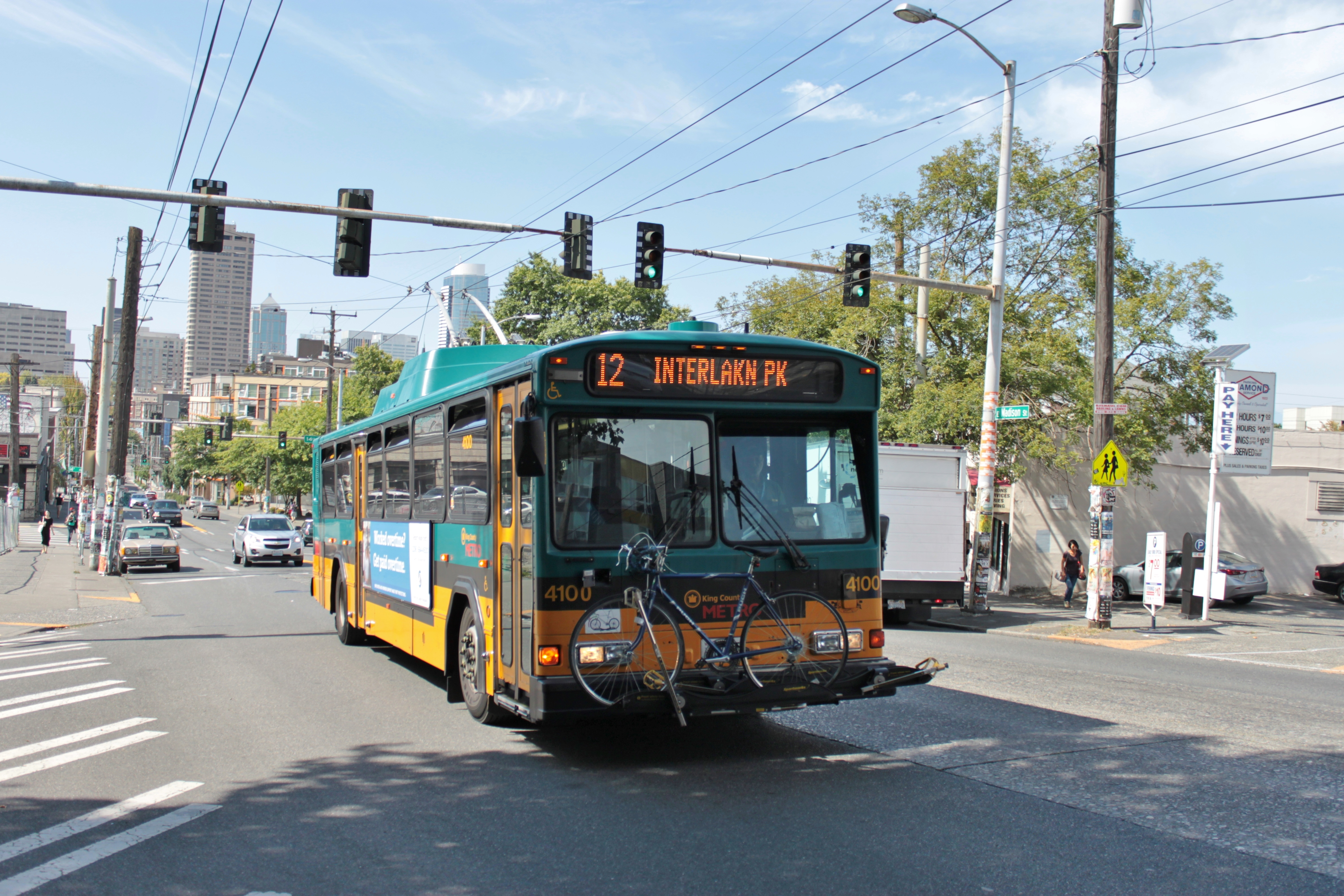
A trolleybus eastbound on Madison Street in 2015

The Seattle trolleybus system has served Madison Street since 1940, primarily with routes 11-East Madison St. (converted to diesel buses in 1965) and 13-19th Avenue (renumbered 12 in 1984). Currently, King County Metro bus route 11 serves Madison Street east of 16th Avenue East, and trolleybus route 12 serves Madison Street between downtown (1st Avenue) and 19th Avenue East.

The Seattle Department of Transportation and King County Metro have implemented the Rapid Ride G bus rapid transit line along Madison Street between the waterfront and 27th Avenue, known as the RapidRide G Line.
