= Rey Amargo =

Chocolate company

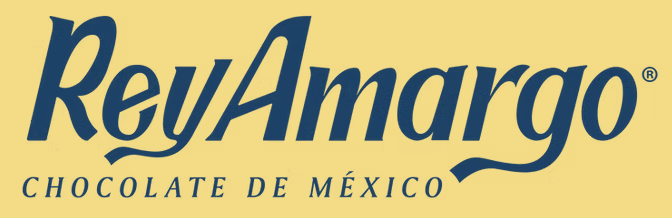

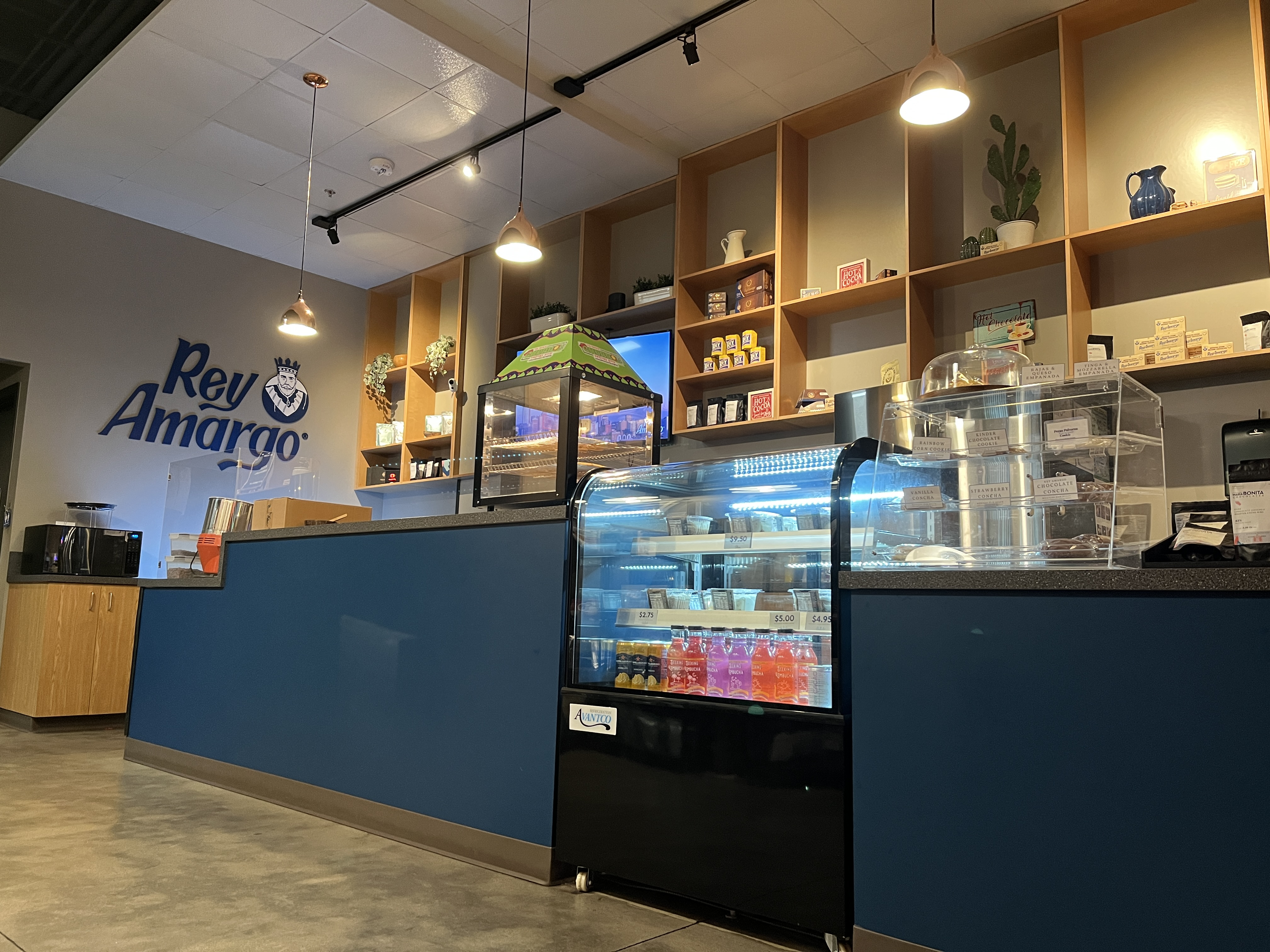
- The Seattle shop's interior in 2023
- Website: reyamargo.us

Rey Amargo is a chocolate company and chain of cafes. The business was established in the Mexican state of Jalisco. The first cafe opened near Guadalajara in 2001 and several locations in Mexico followed.

Rey Amargo's first cafe in the U.S. opened in Seattle in 2021. The Seattle location closed permanently in April 2025.

== Description ==
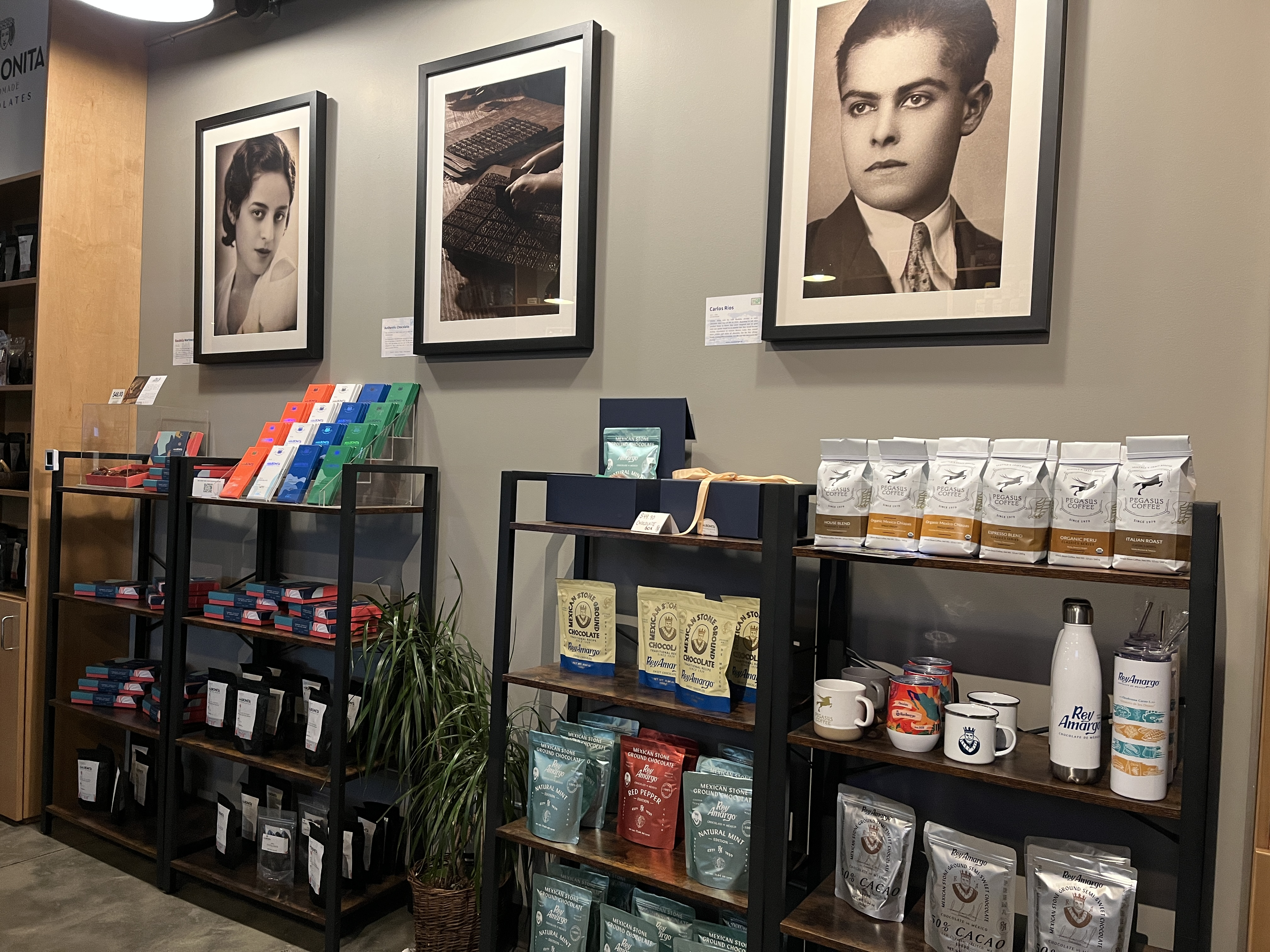
Interior of the Seattle shop in 2023

Rey Amargo, which means "king of bitter", focuses on chocolate-based drinks, including a hot chocolate made with hot water instead of milk. The cafe in Seattle served chocolate bars and stone ground chocolates, coffee beans and fruit covered in chocolate, milkshakes, and sandwiches.

The Seattle location served approximately one dozen hot and cold drinks with chocolate. Hot chocolates used stone-ground chocolates ranging from 32 to 72 percent cacao. "The Royal" used chocolate with 50 percent cocoa. Three varieties of hot chocolate were made using Mexican recipes and ingredients like coffee, roasted corn, and spices. The Seattle location also had three European varieties and a South American variety with medium-sweet chocolate that was served with square pieces of Monterey Jack. Marshmallows and vanilla syrup could also be added to hot chocolates.

The Seattle shop also served baked goods such as vanilla conchas from pop-up bakery Bakescapade.

== History ==
Carlos Rios opened his first shop near Guadalajara, in the Mexican state of Jalisco, in 2009. Since then, six additional shops opened in Mexico. Rios and Valeria Calles opened the first shop in the U.S. on East Pike Street in Seattle's Capitol Hill neighborhood in January 2021. The opening was delayed by the arrival and impact of the COVID-19 pandemic. The Seattle location closed permanently in April 2025.

Rios is the chief executive officer of the retail shops. He managed the Capitol Hill location and his family operates the chocolate factory in Mexico.

== Reception ==
In 2022, Rey Amargo ranked number four in Yelp's list of the top 20 hot chocolate establishments in the U.S.
