= 8oz Burger & Co =

Restaurant in Seattle, Washington, U.S.

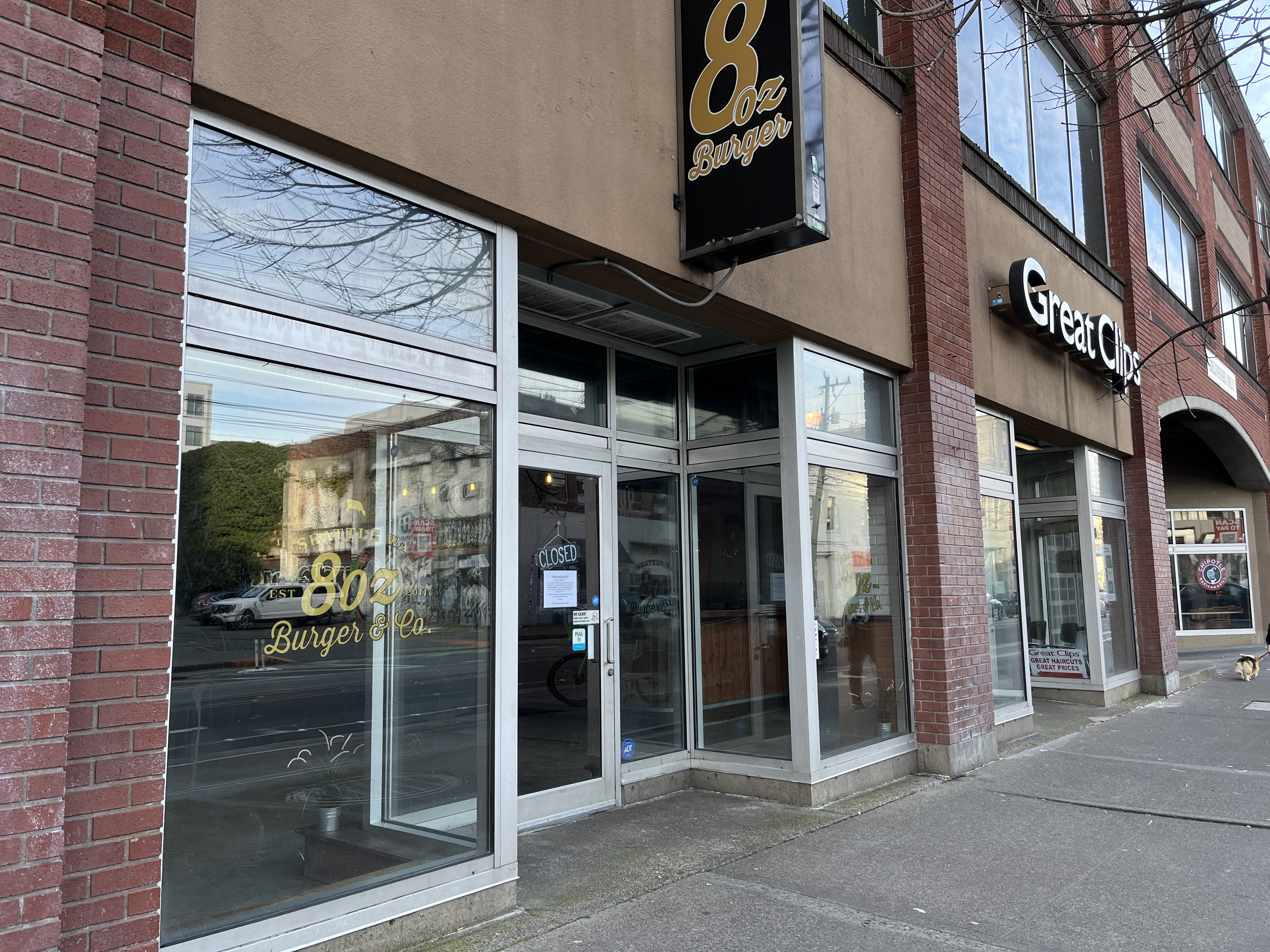
- Exterior of the Broadway location in February 2024, shortly after closing permanently
- Interactive map of 8oz Burger & Co

Restaurant information
- Established: January 2012; 13–14 years ago
- Owner: Kevin Chung
- Food type: American cuisine
- Dress code: Casual
- Location: Seattle, King, Washington, 98122-3854, United States
- Coordinates: 47°36′47″N 122°19′15″W
- Website: 8ozburgerandco.com

8oz Burger & Co is a burger restaurant in Seattle, in the U.S. state of Washington. There have been two locations; the original restaurant operated on Broadway from 2012 to 2024, and an outpost operates in Ballard. The business is owned by Kevin Chung, who had intended to expand the 8oz. Burger Bar chain.

== Description ==
8oz Burger & Co is a burger restaurant in Seattle, Washington. The original location operated at the intersection of Broadway and Union in the Harvard Market shopping center, and an outpost operates in Ballard. According to Tasting Table, 8oz Burger & Co sources meat from Royal Ranch in the Columbia Basin.

The restaurant's signature beef burger has Hill's bacon, balsamic onions, Beecher's cheddar, arugula, and truffle aioli on a brioche bun. The PB & J Burger has tomato jam, bacon, cinnamon spiced peanut butter, and fontina on a pretzel bun. The Pike has habanero jam and the Union has an espresso-rubbed patty. Other burgers have braised pork belly, peppercorn aioli, and jalapeño jam. The Ballard location serves beer and cocktails, and has hosted happy hour. 8oz Burger & Co also offers short rib poutine and milkshakes; varieties include green tea nutella, snickerdoodle, and alcoholic options.

== History ==
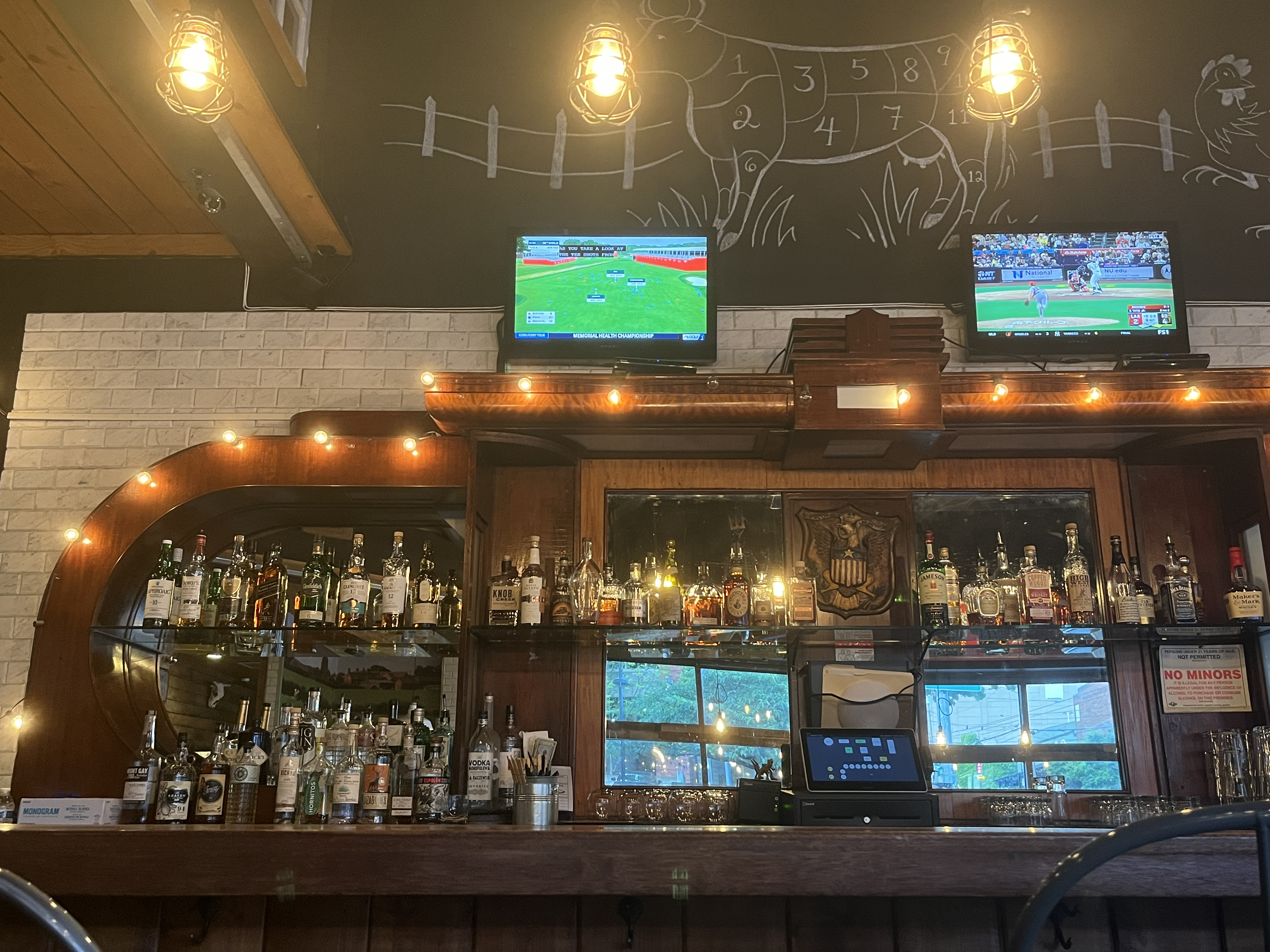
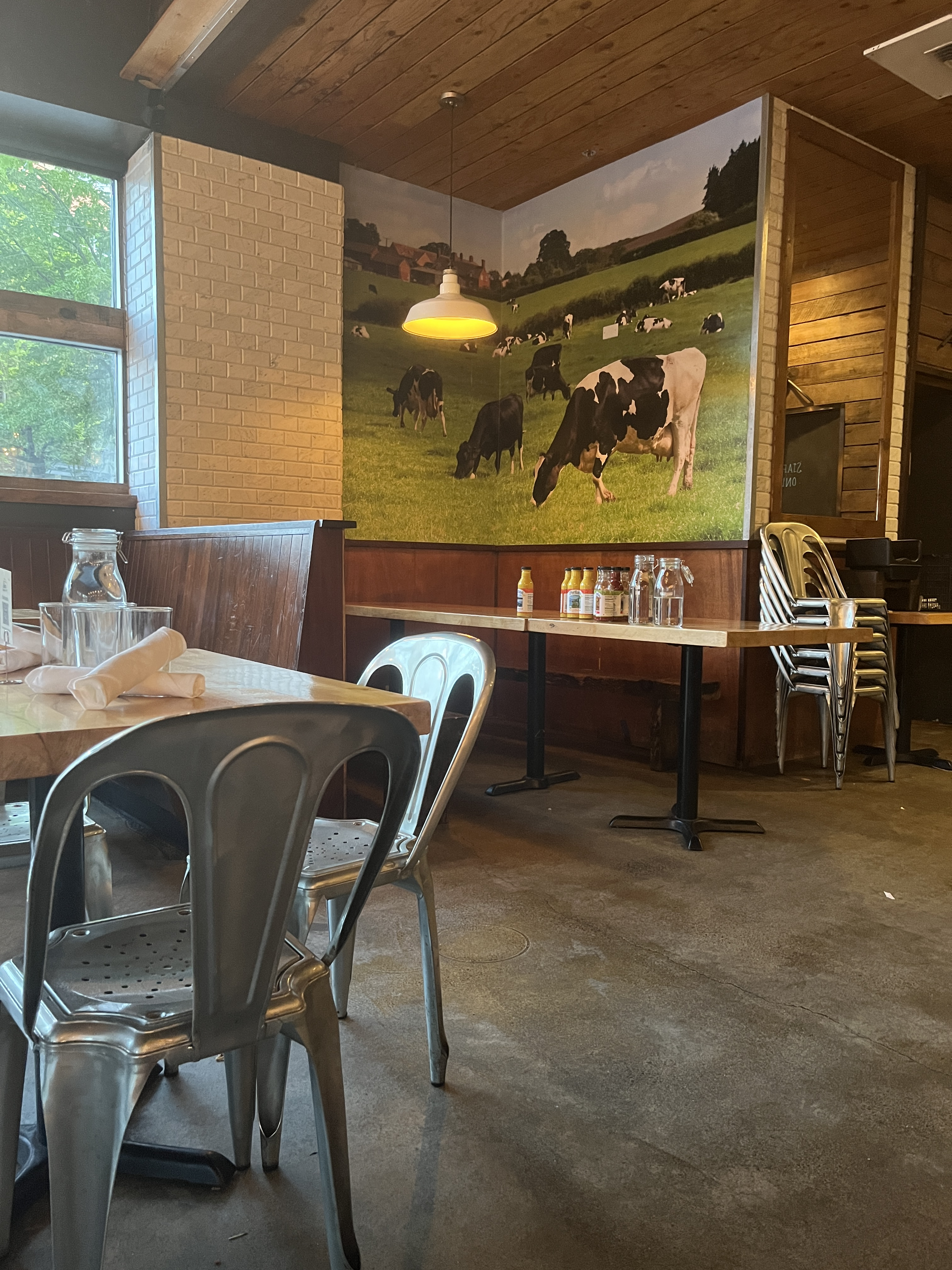
Interior bar (top) and seating area (bottom) of the original restaurant on Broadway, 2023

8oz Burger & Co was formerly part of the restaurant chain 8oz. Burger Bar, which has operated in Los Angeles, Louisiana, and Miami. According to Seattle Metropolitan, owner Kevin Chung "initially intended to be part of the 8oz. group, but when that partnership didn't gel, he already had the name in place and felt it was easier to just move ahead with it". With a unique menu, Chung opened the first 8oz Burger & Co as 8oz. Burger Bar in January 2012, shortly after a previously announced opening date of December 2011. The restaurant launched happy hour in February 2012.

After Chung made plans to open an outpost in Ballard, both locations became known as 8oz Burger & Co. The second location opened in 2014, in the space previously occupied by Hamburger Harry's.

In January 2024, Chung announced plans to close the Broadway location. He attributed the closure to rising labor and rent costs, as well as safety concerns.

== Reception ==
Tyrone Beason of The Seattle Times said the wild-boar burger was among the best he had ever tasted. Seattle Metropolitan has said, 8oz Burger's namesake burger "is why we adore this duo of homegrown burger shops. But the buffalo burger, and other novelty combos, is why we admire it. Throw in hormone-free and grass-fed beef, perfect vanilla shakes, fries that hail from uber-flavorful Kennebec potatoes, and you have a local find, in two locations that do the Great American Meal proud". The magazine's Allecia Vermillion included the business in a 2022 overview of the city's best burgers.

Dylan Joffe included 8oz Burger & Co's Kennebec fries in Eater Seattle's 2016 overview of the city's best French fries. Writers for the Seattle Post-Intelligencer included the restaurant in a 2022 overview of the city's best burgers. The website's Jay Friedman included 8oz Burger & Co in a 2023 list of fifteen eateries for "mind-blowing" burger in the city. Tasting Table's Annie McKay included the business in a 2024 list of the twenty "absolute best" burgers in Seattle.
