= Broadway (Seattle) =

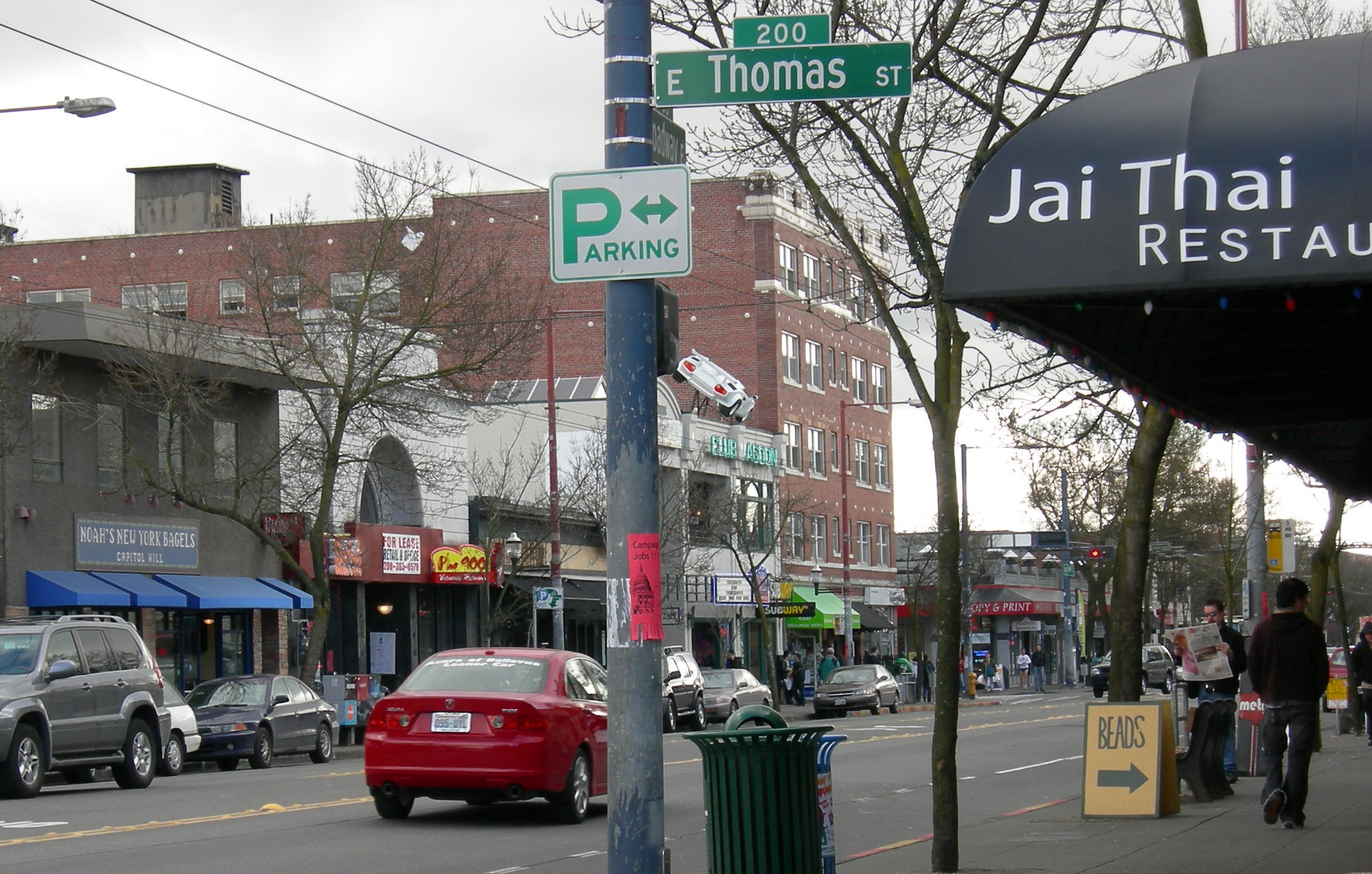
- Looking south on Broadway at Thomas St.
- Maintained by: Seattle Department of Transportation
- Length: 1.6 mi (2.6 km)
- Location: Seattle
- South end: Yesler Way at Yesler Terrace
- Major junctions: Madison Street in First Hill, Pike Street in Capitol Hill
- North end: 10th Avenue East / East Roy Street in Capitol Hill

Broadway is a major north–south thoroughfare in Seattle, Washington. The 1.6-mile-long (2.6 km) arterial runs north from Yesler Way at Yesler Terrace through the First Hill and Capitol Hill neighborhoods to East Roy Street. Broadway East (the directional designation changes at East Denny Way) continues north to East Highland Drive. North of there the street is made up of shorter segments: one from just south of East Blaine Street to just north of East Miller Street, another from East Roanoke Street to East Shelby Street, and the last from East Allison Street to Fuhrman Avenue East.

== Street description ==
Broadway begins at an intersection with Yesler Way in the Yesler Terrace neighborhood, several blocks east of Interstate 5 and Downtown Seattle. The two-lane street travels north, climbing First Hill with streetcar tracks and a protected bike lane on its east side, passing Boren Place and Harborview Medical Center on its west side. At the crest of First Hill, between James and Madison streets, Broadway forms the eastern boundary of the Swedish Medical Center campus and the western boundary of Seattle University. Broadway crosses into Capitol Hill at Pike Street, forming the eastern boundary of Seattle Central College for several blocks, passing Cal Anderson Park and the Capitol Hill light rail station at East John Street. The Capitol Hill branch of the Seattle Public Library is located a block west of Broadway at Republican Street and Harvard Avenue. At East Roy Street, the arterial shifts to the east and becomes 10th Avenue East, continuing north to East Roanoke Street at Roanoke Park and thence on Harvard Avenue East to Eastlake Avenue East and the University Bridge.

The Seattle Department of Transportation (SDOT) classifies Broadway as part of a minor arterial street, which also includes 10th Avenue East and Harvard Avenue East in the same corridor, from Yesler Way to the University Bridge. The busiest section of Broadway is located between Madison Street and Aloha Street on Capitol Hill, where SDOT measured a weekday average of 13,500 vehicles in 2013. As noted above, several other streets named Broadway exist in the northern part of Capitol Hill and the Portage Bay neighborhood, but they are not directly connected to the main section. Between Yesler Way and Union Street, Broadway forms the eastern boundary of the downtown grid as well as the western end of directional suffixes for east–west streets.

== Transit service ==
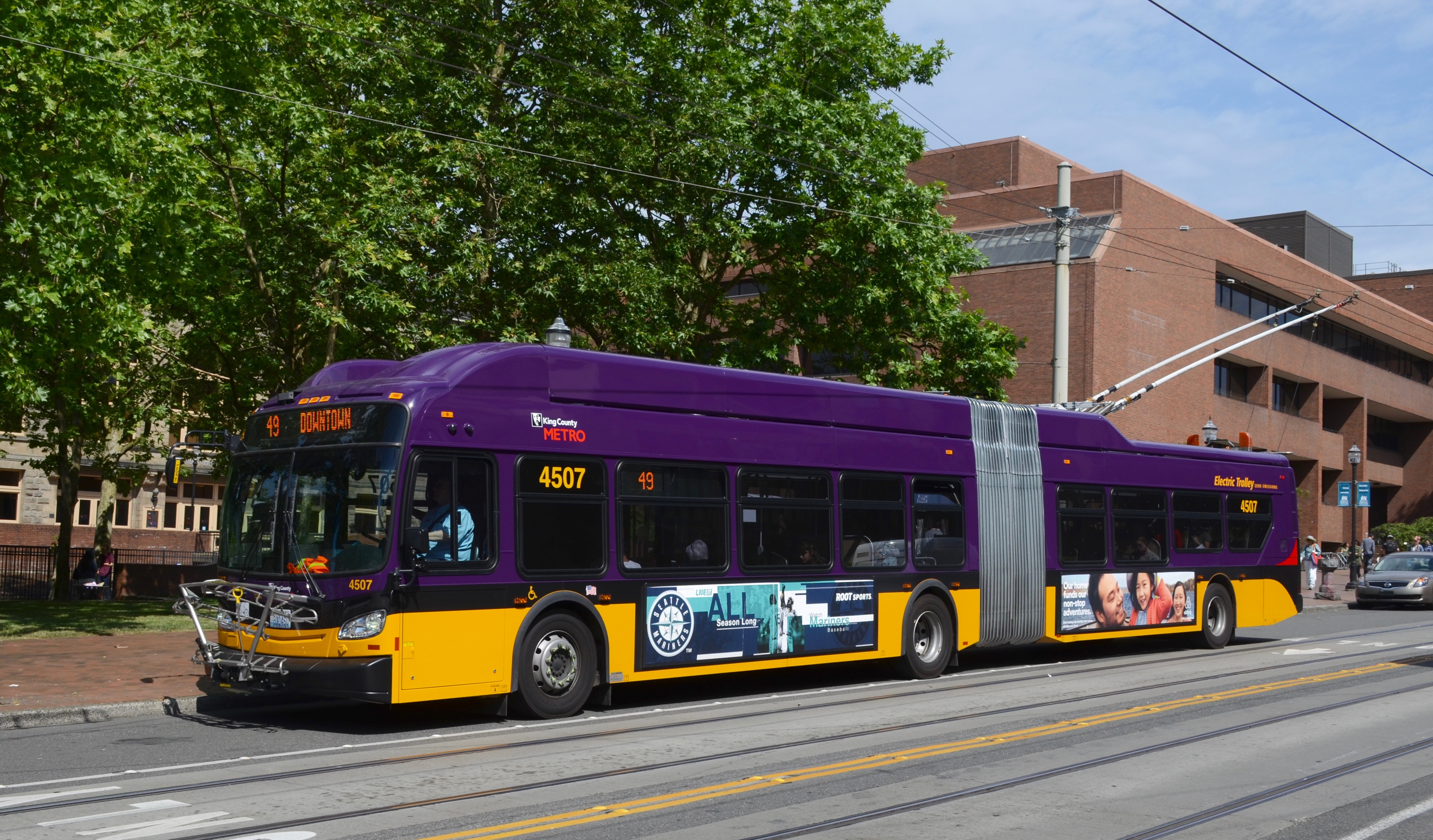
A King County Metro trolleybus on Broadway. Trolleybuses have served Broadway since 1940.

SDOT classifies Broadway as a "Major Transit Street" between Pine and Roy streets and a "Minor Transit Street" from Yesler Way to Pine Street, with transit service provided by three King County Metro bus routes. Route 9 stops on Broadway between Boren Avenue and Roy Street, connecting Capitol Hill and First Hill to the Rainier Valley and several Link light rail stations via limited-stop service on Rainier Avenue South and Martin Luther King Jr. Way South. Route 49 stops on Broadway between Pine and Roy streets, connecting Capitol Hill to Downtown Seattle and the University District with frequent trolleybus service. Route 60 stops on Broadway between Madison and East Mercer streets, connecting Capitol Hill and First Hill to Beacon Hill, Georgetown, White Center and West Seattle.

The First Hill Streetcar, which began operating in January 2016, runs on Broadway between Yesler Way and East Denny Way.

== Major intersections ==
The entire highway is in Seattle, King County.

mi	km	Destinations	Notes
0.0	0.0	Yesler Way	
0.7	1.1	Madison Street	Former SR 513
1.6	2.6	East Roy Street	Continues as 10th Avenue East
1.000 mi = 1.609 km; 1.000 km = 0.621 mi

== In media ==
The Sir Mix-a-Lot song "Posse on Broadway" depicts cruising down the street.
