= Street layout of Seattle =

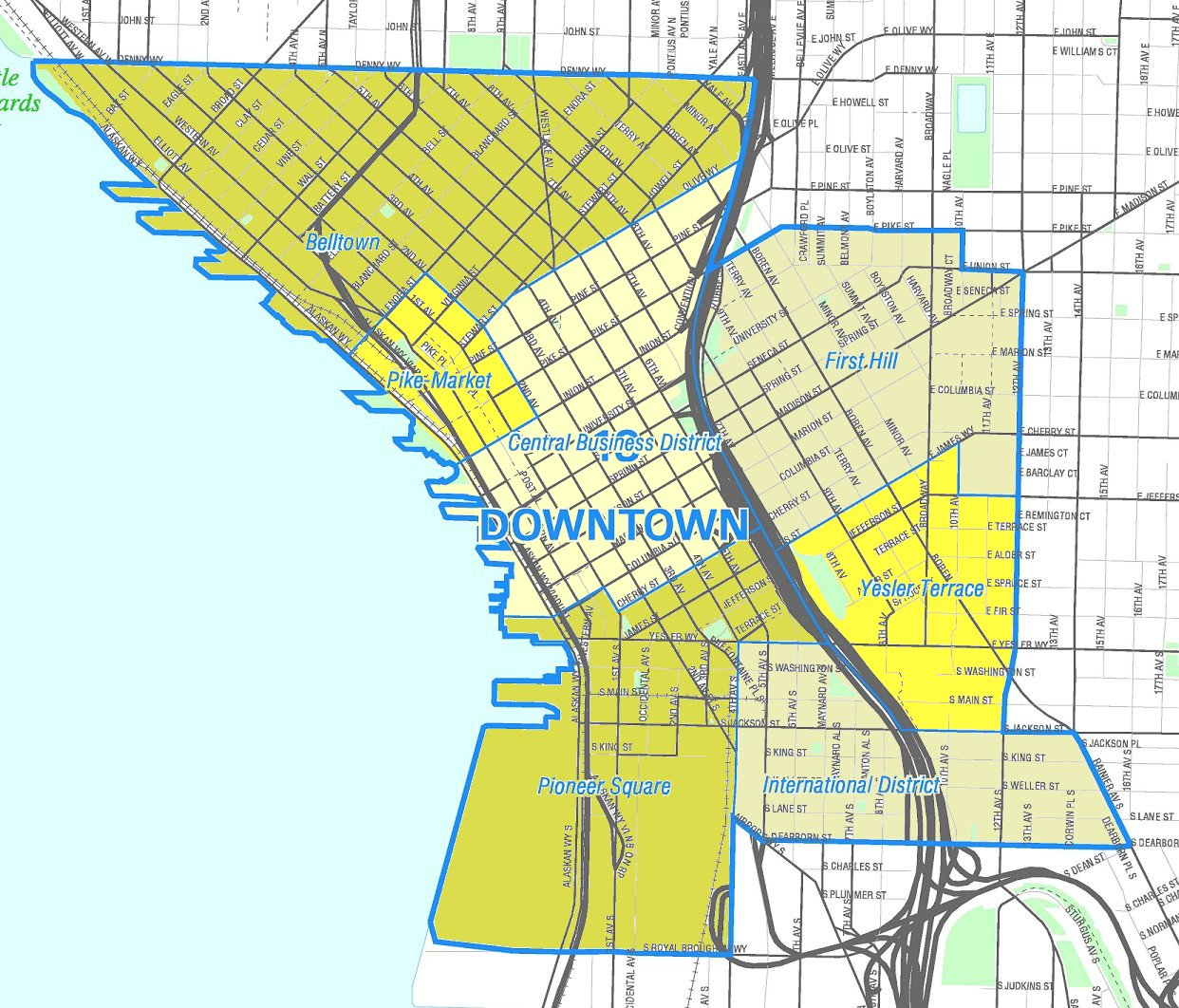
Map showing the angled streets of downtown Seattle

The street layout of Seattle is based on a series of disjointed rectangular street grids. Most of Seattle and King County use a single street grid, oriented on true north. Near the center of the city, various land claims were platted in the 19th century with differently oriented grids, which still survive today. Distinctly oriented grids also exist in some cities annexed by Seattle in the early 20th century, such as Ballard and Georgetown. A small number of streets and roads are exceptions to the grid pattern.

== Street grid layout ==
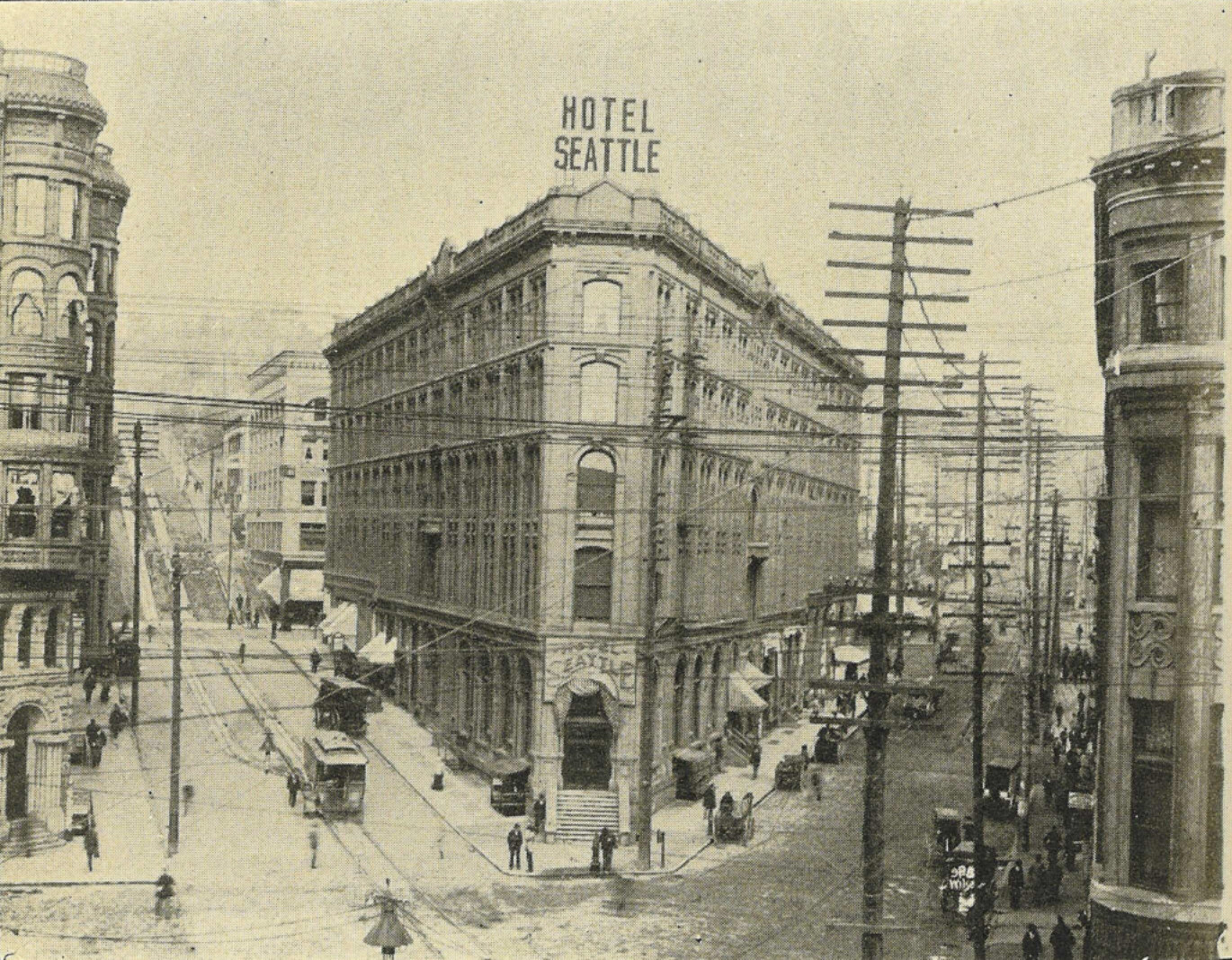
The Hotel Seattle (pictured here in 1900, now demolished). To the right, Yesler Way follows Maynard's plat, and runs due east. To the left, James Street follows Denny's plat, and runs 32 degrees north of east.

Most streets in Seattle run either north–south or east–west. However, this orientation does not prevail in one of the oldest and densest parts of the town, bounded by Elliott Bay to the west, Broadway to the east, Yesler Way to the south, and Denny Way to the north. That exceptional area includes all of the Downtown Central Business District (CBD), the northernmost part of the Pioneer Square neighborhood south of the CBD, First Hill east of the CBD, and Belltown and the Denny Regrade north of the CBD.

The grid is oriented 32 degrees west of north in the southern portion of that exceptional area, and 49 degrees west of north in the northern portion. The two portions are divided by a line that runs along Stewart Street (or its right-of-way) from Alaskan Way on the Central Waterfront east to 3rd Avenue, then along Olive Way from 3rd Avenue to 7th Avenue, and along Howell Street from 7th Avenue to Denny Way.

=== Origins ===
These three grid patterns (due north, 32 degrees west of north, and 49 degrees west of north) are the result of a disagreement between David Swinson "Doc" Maynard, whose land claim lay south of Yesler Way, and Arthur A. Denny and Carson D. Boren, whose land claims lay to the north (with Henry Yesler and his mill soon brought in between Denny and the others): Denny and Boren preferred that their streets follow the Elliott Bay shoreline, while Maynard favored a grid based on the cardinal directions for his (mostly flat, mostly wet) claim. All three were competing to have the downtown built on their land. Denny prevailed in what would become the central business district, but it was Maynard's grid that ended up being extended throughout the city and into all of King County (60 miles east to west). Several cities in King County, such as Renton, Kirkland, and North Bend, have their own naming system and grid in the center of town, but Maynard's Pioneer Square–based grid officially covers the entire county.

== Addressing ==
Street addresses in Seattle (and throughout much of King County) follow a uniform numbering plan. On roads that run north and south [generally called an Avenue], odd numbered addresses are on the west side and even numbered addresses are on the east side. On roads that run east and west [generally called a Street], odd numbered addresses are on the south side and even numbered addresses are on the north side. The address is based on its location relative to the grid (not relative to the location of the beginning of each separate road, or its nearest intersection) with the last two digits consecutively incrementing with the grid and the leading digits designating the location on the grid.

Some mnemonics are helpful here:

- STreets run eaST and weST
- aveNueS run North and South
- EveN numbered addresses are on the East and North side of the road (which is likely called a street or avenue)

The name 32nd Avenue NE applies to several physically discontinuous street segments running along approximately the same line of the grid. One of these segments runs from NE 75th Street to NE 80th Street, crossed only by NE 77th Street; its two blocks are the 7500 block and the 7700 block. Buildings on that street between 75th and 77th would have four-digit addresses beginning with 75; buildings above 77th would have four-digit addresses beginning with 77. If there is such an address as 7764 32nd Avenue NE, then it is on the east side of the street rather far up the 7700 block, and if there is a 7765 it will be approximately across the street from 7764.

North of the ship canal in Seattle, and north of NE 140th St in East King County, grid numbers are spread in increments by 20 per mile (which works out to one numerical block per minute when walking at 3 miles per hour). In much of the rest of King County (south of NE 140th St, and east of 68th Ave NE at the north end of Lake Washington), grid numbers are spread in increments 16 per mile (which works out to 10 per kilometer). Due to the regular spacing of street numbers, approximate distances between two points on the grid can be easily calculated.

A few older cities within King County have their own distinct numbering plan, centered on their own historic downtown areas, including much of Renton and historic parts of Kirkland. In Kirkland, streets and avenues run perpendicular to the usual King County designations. In Renton (east of I-405), avenues are named for Washington State communities and arranged in alphabetical order (Aberdeen, Blaine, Camas, etc.).

In Seattle, the names of the twelve streets in the heart of the central business district are paired by their first letters. From south to north, they are: Jefferson, James, Cherry, Columbia, Marion, Madison, Spring, Seneca, University, Union, Pike, Pine. One way to remember the order of the street pairs is with the mnemonic "Jesus Christ Made Seattle Under Protest" (or "Pressure") (JCMSUP).

Only one street in Seattle, Madison Street, runs uninterrupted from the salt water of Puget Sound in the west to the fresh water of Lake Washington in the east. The unusual orientation and contiguous nature of this street dates back to a time when it was a direct route to a cross-lake ferry between Madison Park and Houghton on the east side of Lake Washington. A cable car once operated on Madison Street from downtown Seattle to the ferry terminal at Madison Park, and the ferry route constituted an almost linear continuation of the street across the lake. Other historical cable cars ran along Yesler Way, Jackson Street, Queen Anne Avenue—"The Counterbalance", and 1st Avenue-2nd Avenue). No street, excluding Interstate 5 and State Route 99—both freeways in whole or in part—runs without interruption from the northern to the southern city limits. This is largely the result of Seattle's topography. Split by the Duwamish River and the Lake Washington Ship Canal, containing four lakes within the city limits, and boasting deep ravines and at least seven hills there are few more-or-less straight routes where such a road could reasonably be built, even allowing for the short bridge or two.

== Directionals ==
Map of directionals in Seattle

Seattle and King County make systematic use of directionals (such as N for north or NE for northeast) in street names, although residents often omit the directionals when describing addresses in their own neighborhoods. To a lesser degree, street types such as avenue and street are also used systematically. As a rule, "streets" run east–west (or, in and near downtown, northeast–southwest), and "avenues" run north–south (or, in and near downtown, northwest–southeast). A road, boulevard, way, or thoroughfare with any other type designation may run in any direction. The land boundaries of the district laid out according to the Denny and Boren plats that follow the shoreline are all "Ways" (Denny Way, Yesler Way, Broadway).

Furthermore:

- "Streets" and other east–west thoroughfares prefix the directional; for example NE 45th Street.
- "Avenues" and other north–south thoroughfares suffix the directional; for example 15th Avenue NE, University Way NE.
- A mnemonic for directionals is that the general direction of a thoroughfare is the direction nearer its name or number; for example NE 45th Street runs generally east (and west), while University Way NE runs generally north (and south).
- "Places" are usually cul-de-sacs or dead-ends and run in any direction.
- In most sections of the city, the same directional is used for both of these purposes; the exceptions are immediately east and north of the downtown area, and the lack of any directionals in the downtown area itself.

Seattle is divided into ten sections, each with a different combination of directionals.

North of the Lake Washington Ship Canal are the following sections: west of 1st Avenue NW, the NW section; between 1st Avenue NW and 1st Avenue NE, the N section; east of 1st Avenue NE, the NE section.

South of the canal but north of Denny Way are the following sections: west of Queen Anne Avenue N, the W section; between Queen Anne Avenue N and a border defined by Eastlake Avenue E (south of E Nelson Place) and Lake Union (north of E Nelson Place), the Avenue N section, in which avenues are suffixed N and in which streets have no prefix; east of the Eastlake Avenue E–Lake Union border, the E section.

South of Denny Way but north of Yesler Way are two sections: east of Broadway from Yesler Way north to Union Street, east of Minor Avenue from Union Street north to Pike Street, and east of Melrose Avenue from Pike Street north to Denny Way, the E Street section, streets are prefixed E and avenues have no suffix; to the west of this border, the downtown section, no directionals are used.

South of Yesler Way are two sections: east of the waterfront and (south of the Duwamish Waterway) east of 1st Avenue S, the S section; and west of 1st Avenue S, the SW section. Within the Seattle city limits there is no SE section; however, the non-Seattle SE section contains all of the southeastern suburbs and the rest of southern King County, including Mercer Island, parts of Renton, and Bellevue south of Main Street, Sammamish south of E Main Street, and other locations within the county.

== Arterials defined ==
The city defines three types of arterials — Principal, Minor, and Collector:

- Principal arterials serve as the principal route for the movement of traffic through the city. These connect interstate freeways to major activity centers, to minor and collector arterial streets and directly to destinations, as well as interneighborhood traffic.
- Minor arterials are generally located on neighborhood boundaries except when necessary to provide adequate service to traffic generators located within neighborhoods.
- Collector arterials are typically located within neighborhood boundaries and serve small group of stores, schools, small apartment complexes, and residential land uses.
- Access Streets are residential and commercial side streets.

== See also ==
- Seattle neighborhoods for articles on individual neighborhoods, including information on thoroughfares.

== Bibliography ==
- Anderson, Ross (September 16, 2001), "150 Years: Seattle By and By; Pinpoints, Plots, Plats, and Panoramas (2001 Digital image of Seattle)", The Seattle Times, archived from the original on December 6, 2001. Shows the landscape carved by the Vashon Glacier some 14,000 years ago.
- Baillargeon, Emily (Spring 1999), "Seattle Now: A Letter", New England Review, 20 (2), Middlebury College Publications: 148–163, JSTOR 40244477 – via Questia. (First link shows a slightly longer excerpt of the article than JSTOR.)
- SDOT (December 11, 2003), Street Classification Maps, City of Seattle Department of Transportation, archived from the original on June 14, 2006.
- SDOT (2003b), Planned Arterials Map Legend Definitions (PDF), City of Seattle Department of Transportation, archived from the original (PDF) on January 17, 2006.
- Crowley, Walt (October 2, 2000), Cable cars enter service in Seattle on September 28, 1887, HistoryLink.
- Phelps, Myra L (1978), Public Works in Seattle: A Narrative History [of] the Engineering Department, 1875-1975, Seattle: Seattle Engineering Department, ISBN 0-9601928-1-6.
- Sale, Roger (1976). Seattle, Past to Present. University of Washington Press. ISBN 9780295955216.
- Samson, Karl (2006), Frommer's: Seattle (Orientation). Online selection from Karl Samson (2006), Frommer's Seattle 2006 [Title incremented annually each January], Wiley, ISBN 0-7645-9587-3.
- Speidel, Bill (1967), Sons of the Profits; or, There's No Business Like Grow Business: the Seattle story, 1851-1901, Seattle: Nettle Creek Publishing Company, ISBN 0-914890-00-X.
- Speidel, Bill (1978), Doc Maynard: The Man Who Invented Seattle, Seattle: Nettle Creek Publishing Company, ISBN 0-914890-02-6.
- KC DDES (2007), Street Addresses and Road Names (PDF), King County, WA: King County Department of Developmental and Environmental Services (DDES).
- Google Maps (Eastlake Avenue E and E Nelson Place), Google Maps.
