= Pike Street =

Street in Seattle

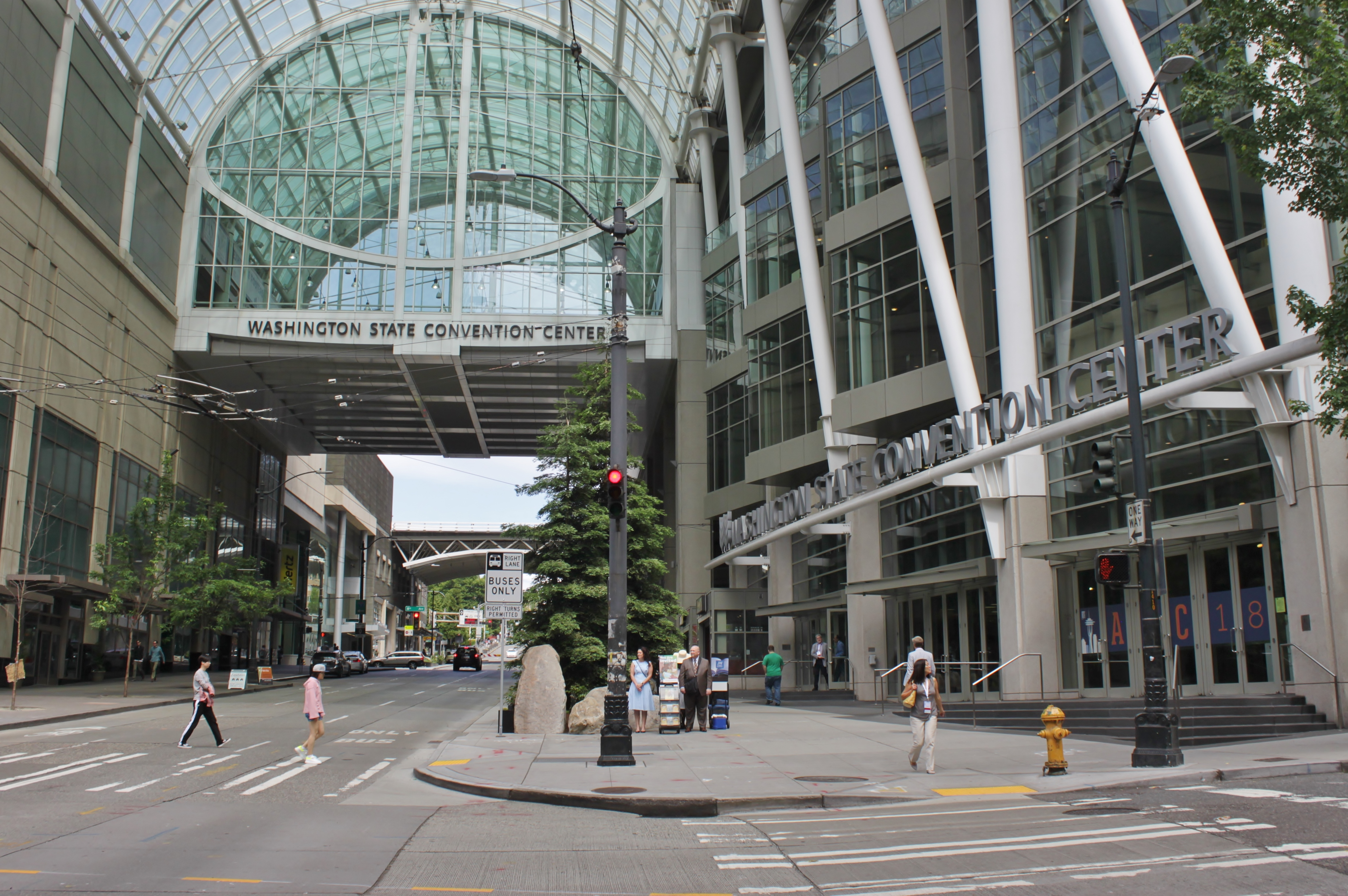
- The Washington State Convention Center straddles Pike Street at 7th Avenue
- Interactive map of Pike Street
- Type: Arterial street
- Maintained by: Seattle Department of Transportation
- Location: Seattle
- West end: Pike Place in Downtown Seattle
- Major junctions: Interstate 5, Broadway, Madison Street
- East end: Lake Washington Boulevard in Madrona

Construction
- Inauguration: 1869

Pike Street is an east-west street in Seattle. It extends from Pike Place above Seattle's saltwater waterfront at Elliott Bay through Downtown Seattle, across Capitol Hill to the freshwater shore of Lake Washington at Lake Washington Boulevard. A segment less than a block long exists at Alaskan Way on Elliott Bay, connected to the rest of the street only by the pedestrian Pike Street Hill Climb; the bottom of the hillclimb under the Alaskan Way Viaduct was the original shoreline of the city before major modification and construction of the Seattle Seawall. It is included in the south-to-north mnemonic "Jesus Christ Made Seattle Under Protest" for the street layout of Seattle.

== History and culture ==
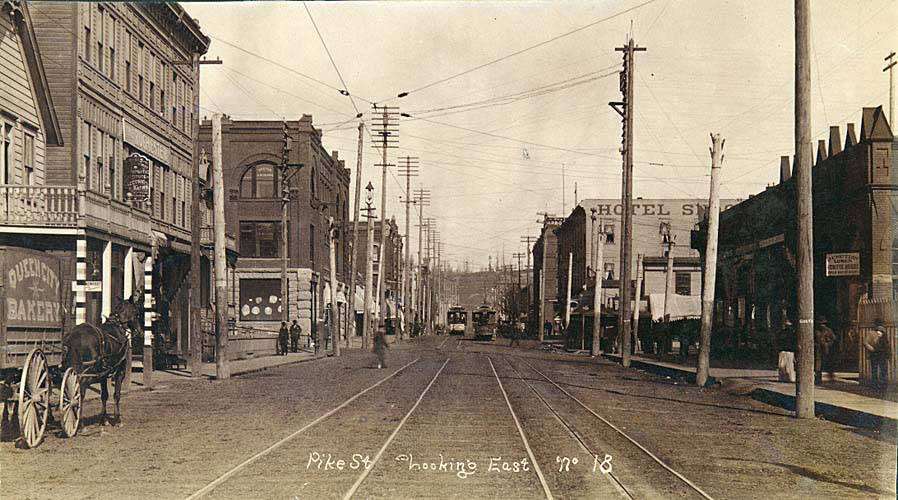
Pike Street in 1891, unpaved

The street was one of the original named streets of Seattle in Arthur A. Denny's 1869 platting. It was named by him for John Pike, architect and builder of the Washington Territorial University in what is now the Metropolitan Tract of downtown Seattle. Until the early 20th century Denny Regrade leveled Denny Hill, it was the easiest way from the waterfront to Lake Union, and the main street of the north end of the city (boundaries now defined roughly by Downtown Seattle).

In 1872, Seattle's first railroad, Seattle Coal & Transportation Company, followed Pike Street to deliver Newcastle, King County coal to Elliott Bay transshipped via Lake Washington and Lake Union. It lasted until 1878 when Seattle and Walla Walla Railroad built a direct line from the fields, around the lake and through Renton.

The Pike–Pine corridor on Capitol Hill was once the city's center for automobile sales. After this moved to the suburbs, rents declined and it became a hub for gay culture and Seattle's grunge scene. Gentrification the 21st century brought increasing property values.

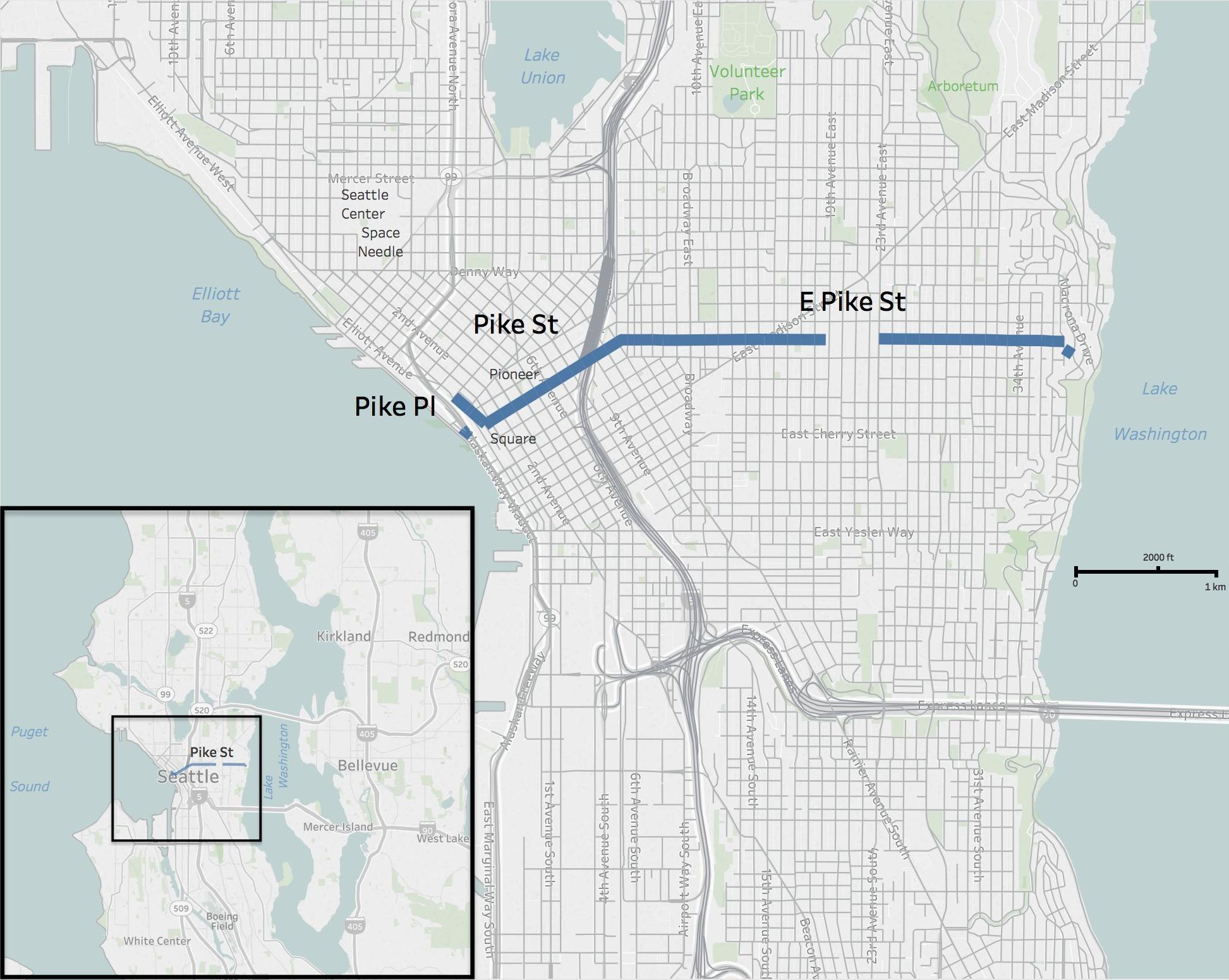
Map of Pike Pl., Pike St., and E. Pike St.

=== Crime ===
The Seattle Times said, "For decades, the Pike-Pine corridor between First and Third avenues has been known for run-down buildings, parking lots prone to drug deals and heroin addicts ... effectively a dam separating Pike Place Market and its 9 million annual visitors from the city's shopping and convention areas". In the 21st century, Second and Third Avenues between the same two streets has a similar reputation. The Seattle Business Association CEO said "drug dealers sort of own the real estate in that part of downtown" and the mayor called it "a dangerous open-air drug market" with 10,000 calls for police response in one year, according to the city and the FBI. The U.S. Department of Justice cited "what has become an open air drug market at Pike/Pine and Third Avenue in downtown Seattle" in 2015.

=== Public square ===
Westlake Park between Pike and Pine Streets is a public square in the downtown retail area. The park and surrounding streets have been the site of the exercise of free speech, marches and protests including the 1999 Seattle WTO protests, Occupy Seattle in 2011, Black Lives Matter annual protests since 2014, and Women's March on Seattle in 2017. The park contains a Speakers' Corner.

=== Retail and tourism ===
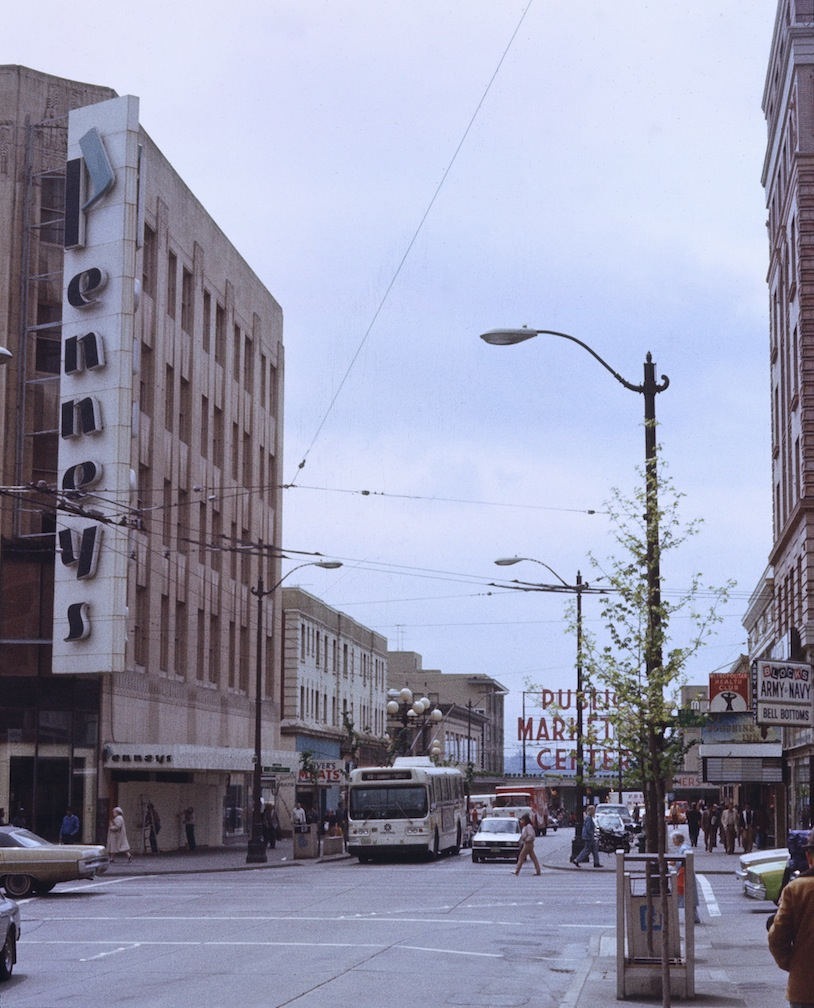
The former J. C. Penney store at Pike at 2nd in 1982, with Pike Place Market in the background

5th Avenue and Pike is the heart of the Seattle downtown shopping district, the Pike–Pine retail corridor, which includes Westlake Center and Pacific Place, both of which are on blocks touching Pike Street. Smaller notable retail establishments on the street include historic landmark Coliseum Theater (the city's first movie theater) and Monorail Espresso (the world's first espresso cart, now in a permanent location), both downtown; and Elysian Brewing Company and Elliott Bay Books either on the street or on blocks bounded by the street on Capitol Hill. The original REI store was also on a Capitol Hill block bounded by Pike and Pine until it relocated in the 1990s. The intersection of Pike and Broadway on Capitol Hill is the south end of another business district represented by the Broadway Improvement Area, authorized by city ordinance.

The Washington State Convention Center straddles Pike Street at 7th Avenue and the two sections are spanned by a skybridge crossing over Pike, the convention center's "signature element" but one that was controversial when built, due to its obstruction of views of Elliott Bay from Capitol Hill, and other architectural and public space considerations.

In February 2023, construction of an improved pedestrian and cyclist corridor on Pine and Pike streets began as part of a downtown revitalization project. Among the changes is a woonerf between 1st and 2nd avenues that would replace the existing cherry trees and widen the sidewalks.

=== Gay culture ===
In the 21st century the street remains the "epicenter of Seattle's gay culture". According to one guide, Seattle's gay neighborhood is "centered on Pike Street between Belmont Avenue and 18th Avenue".

=== Pedestrian initiatives ===
Pike was an experimental "people street", or temporary pedestrian zone, in a city program begun in 2015. It was temporarily closed to automobile traffic and opened to exclusive pedestrian, business and community uses that included yoga classes, in-street cafe dining, arts and crafts fairs, a fashion show, and other activities. The program was repeated several times in 2016 and 2017.

The westernmost block of Pike Street, between 1st and 2nd avenues, was closed for renovations in March 2023. It remained closed to vehicles after construction was finished in June to promote it as a "green and healthy" street and add pedestrian space in downtown.
