= First Hill, Seattle =

Neighborhood in Downtown Seattle

- Seattle Neighborhood
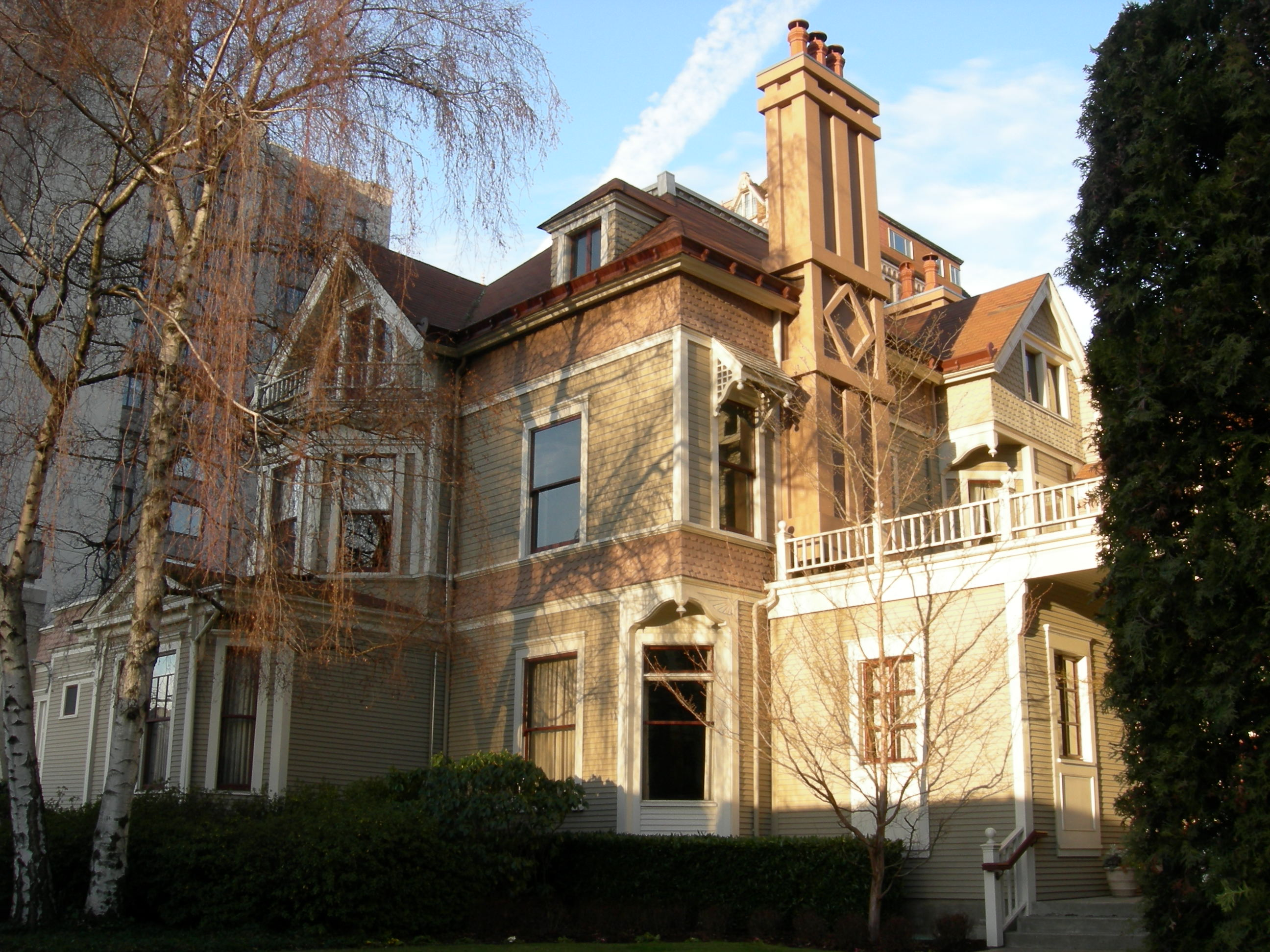
- The University Club at the former Stacy House on the corner of Boren and Madison, one of a remaining handful of grand houses that once characterized the neighborhood
- Nicknames: Profanity Hill (dated), Pill Hill
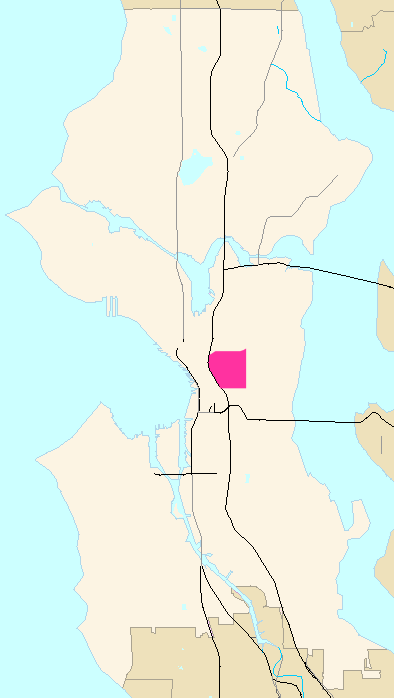
- First Hill highlighted in pink
- Coordinates: 47°36′33″N 122°19′30″W
- Country: United States
- State: Washington
- County: King
- City: Seattle
- ZIP Code: 98122
- Area Code: 206, 564

First Hill is a neighborhood in Seattle, Washington, United States. It is named for the hill on which it is located, which in turn is so named for being the first hill encountered while traveling east from downtown Seattle toward Lake Washington. First Hill is bounded on the west by Interstate 5, beyond which is Downtown, on the north by E. Pike and E. Madison Streets, beyond which is Capitol Hill, and on the south by Yesler Way, beyond which is the International District. The City of Seattle provides conflicting information about its eastern limit, beyond which are Cherry Hill and the Central District. Some describe it as being bounded by Broadway and Boren Avenues, while others describe it as being bounded by 12th Avenue.

First Hill has been home to Seattle University, a private Jesuit university, since 1891. Also located on the hill are Northwest School, Seattle Academy of Arts and Sciences, the Catholic O'Dea High School, and Frye Art Museum, as well as several churches that have become city landmarks: Trinity Parish Church, St. James Cathedral, and Seattle First Baptist Church.

== History ==
First Hill became increasingly attractive in the 1890s as a location close enough to downtown for convenience, but removed enough to offer a sense of retreat for the wealthier residents of Seattle. Among the elite to live in the area at that time were Indian fighter turned businessman Granville O. Haller, local judge Cornelius H. Hanford, successful meatpacker Charles Frye (whose private art collection is now visible to the public at First Hill's Frye Art Museum), contractor Morgan Carkeek (for whom Carkeek Park is named), William Boeing, founder of the Boeing Company and Judge Hiram Bond. The photographer Imogen Cunningham and her husband Roi Partridge lived in a boarding house on First Hill during the 1910s, until the residents of the house were evicted and the property converted into a hospital. More recently, local philanthropist and businesswoman Patsy Bullitt Collins resided in a First Hill condominium.

=== First King County Courthouse ===
The first official King County Courthouse was built on First Hill in 1889–1890. The steep climb to the courthouse from downtown legal offices caused such frequent and vociferous complaints that Seattle lawyers nicknamed the area "Profanity Hill". The courthouse, constructed on the corner of 7th Avenue and Alder Street, was quickly outgrown, which, along with the loud dissatisfaction of local attorneys, led the county to move the courthouse off First Hill in 1916.

== Pill Hill ==
The hill is also known as "Pill Hill" due to its many medical buildings. In addition to being the current home of three major health care facilities (Harborview Medical Center, Swedish Medical Center/First Hill, and Virginia Mason Medical Center or four if Swedish Medical Center/Cherry Hill, located on 16th Avenue, is included in the neighborhood), and the Puget Sound Blood Center, it was also once the location of the Maynard, Seattle General, and Doctors Hospitals (all of which merged into Swedish) as well as Cabrini Hospital.

== Transportation ==
First Hill's major thoroughfares, assuming its greatest possible extent, include Madison, James, Cherry, and Spring Streets and Yesler Way (east- and west-bound) and 9th and Boren Avenues and Broadway (north- and south-bound).

=== Public Transportation ===
A Link light rail station was originally planned for First Hill, but was cancelled due to geotechnical risks prior to the construction of University Link. Instead, the First Hill Streetcar was built on Broadway and Jackson Street to connect First Hill with the International District / Chinatown and Capitol Hill stations, beginning service in January 2016.

== Panoramic view of First Hill ==
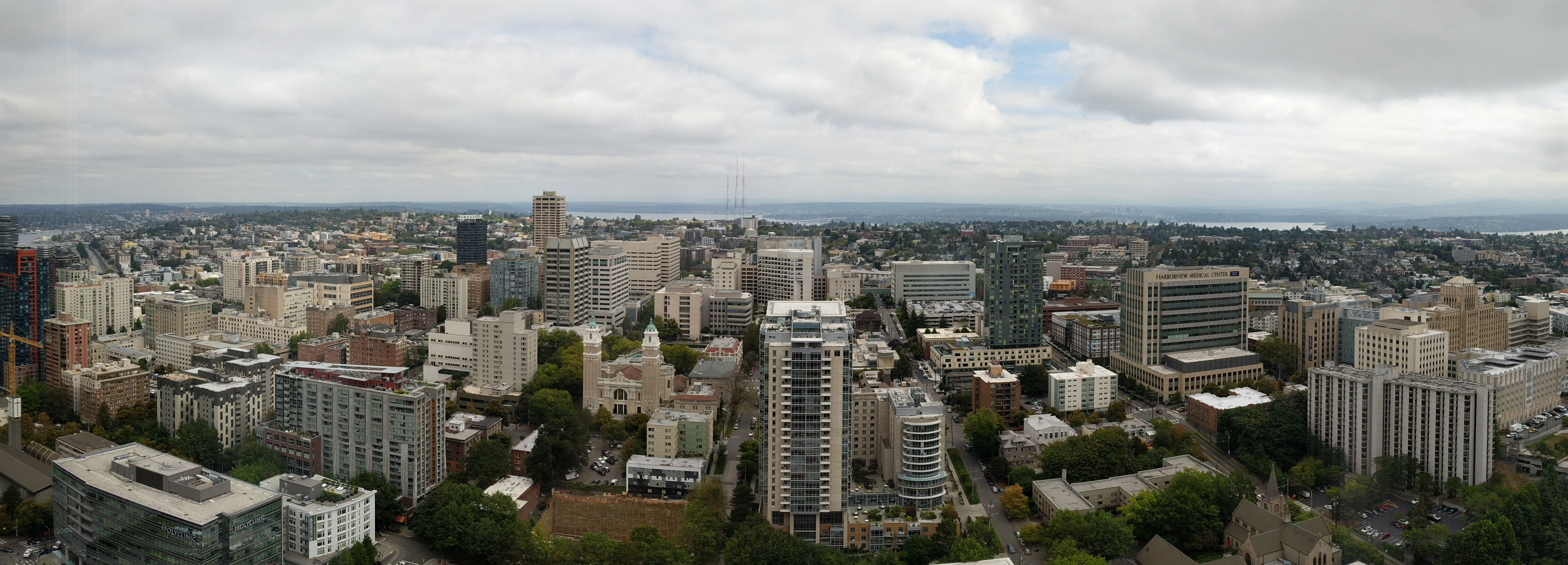
First Hill, seen from the Seattle Municipal Tower
