= List of museums in Seattle =

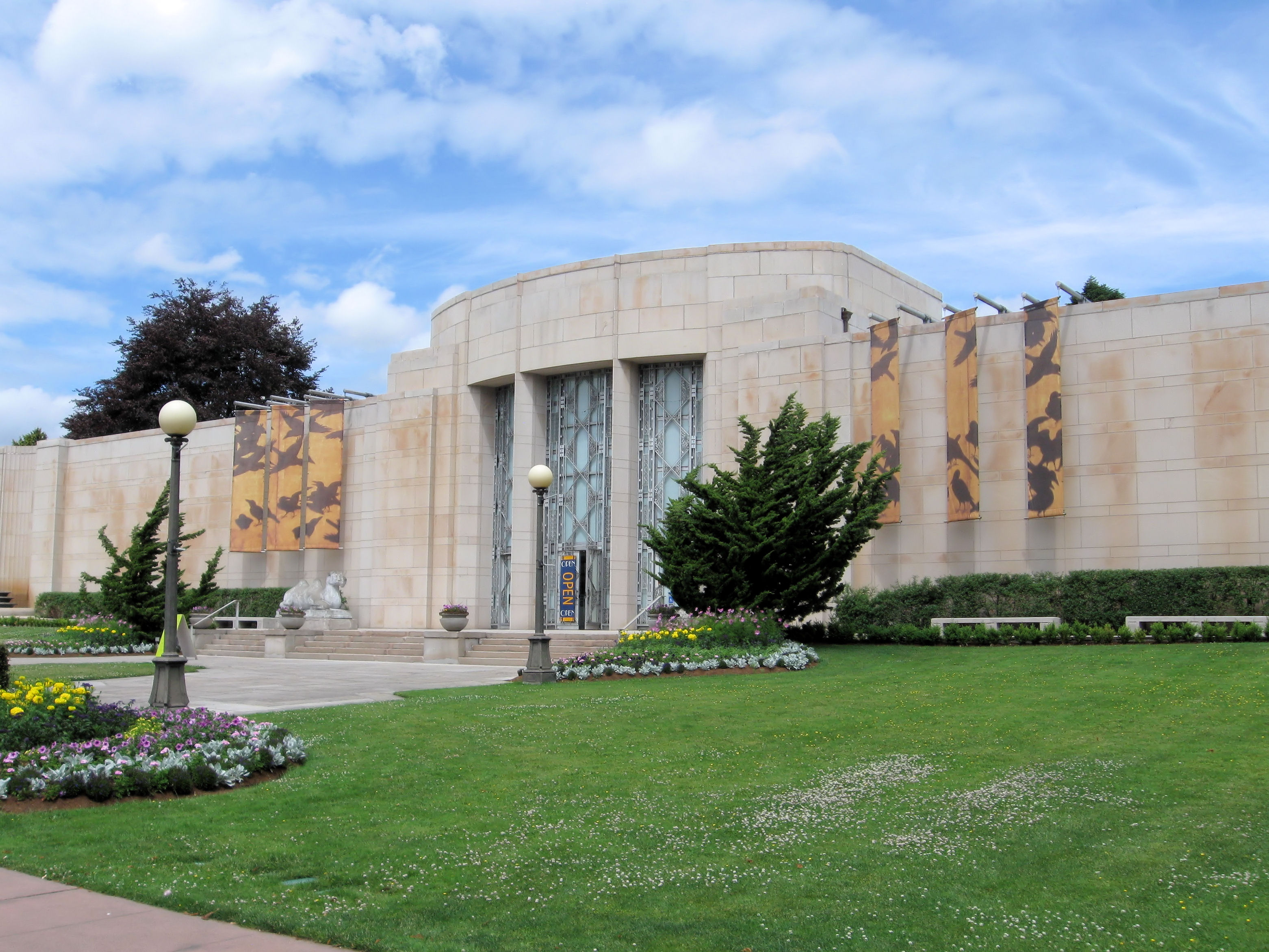
The Seattle Asian Art Museum in Volunteer Park, a designated city landmark, housed the main Seattle Art Museum (SAM) 1933-1981.

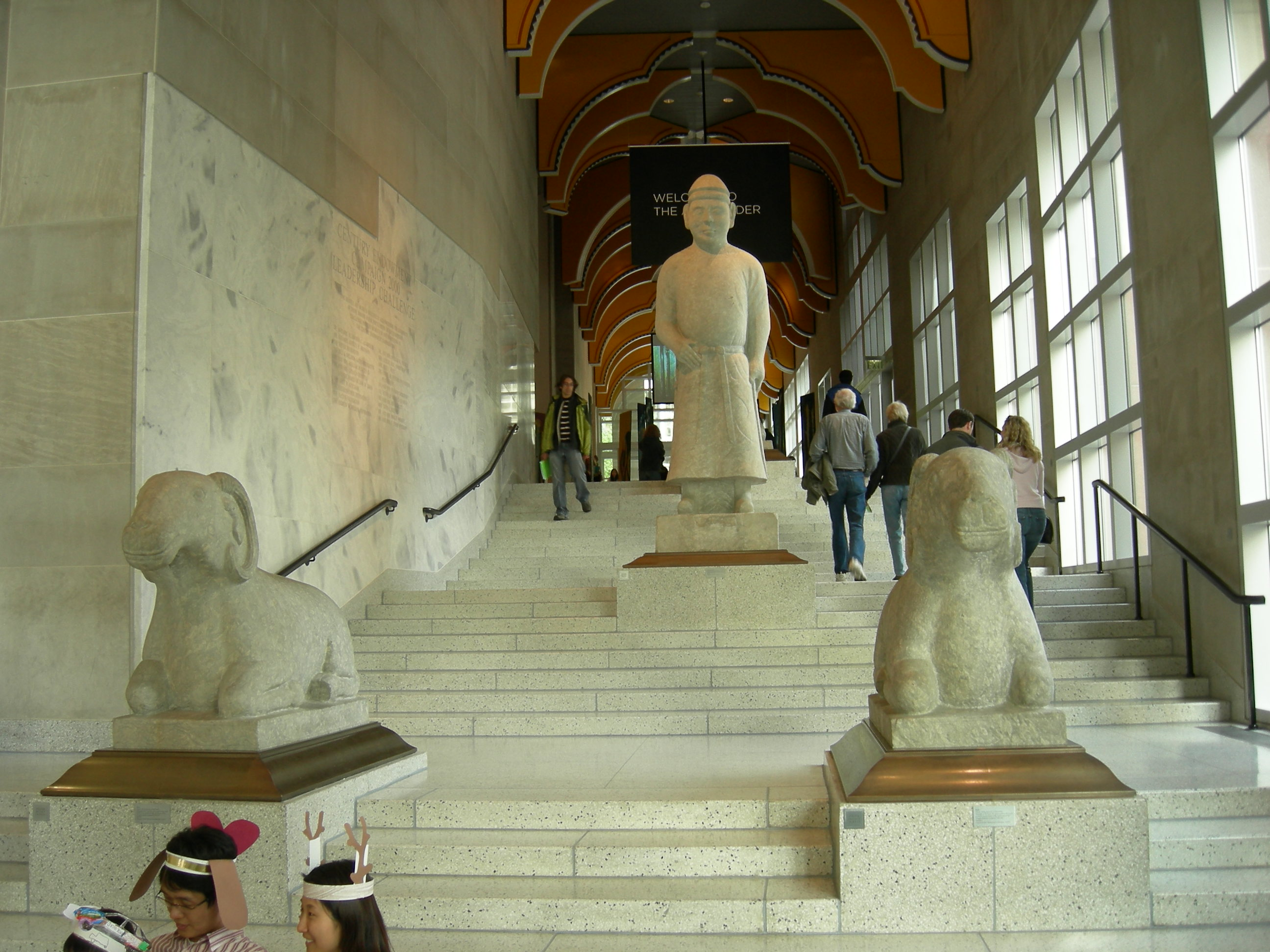
The "Art Ladder": the main staircase of the 1991 Robert Venturi-designed wing of SAM.

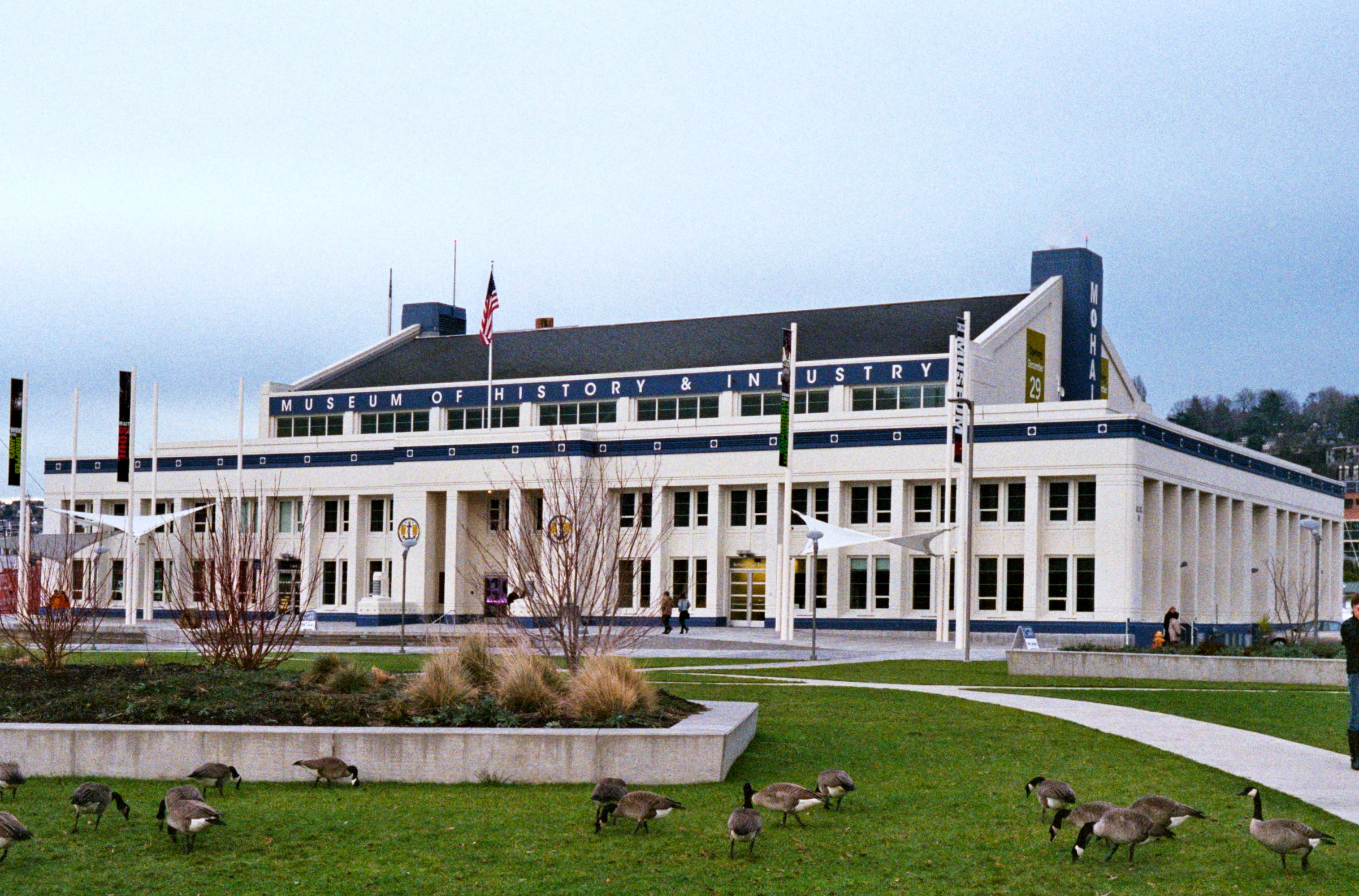
The Naval Reserve Armory, now home to MOHAI.

Seattle, Washington is home to four major art museums and galleries: the Frye Art Museum, Henry Art Gallery, Seattle Art Museum, and the Seattle Asian Art Museum.

== Museums ==
Name	Neighborhood	Type	Summary
Ballard Locks Museum/Visitor Center	Ballard	History	Artifacts and exhibits of Hiram M. Chittenden Locks dedicated in 1917 website http://ballardlocks.org/visitor-center-museum.html
Bill & Melinda Gates Foundation Visitor Center	Lower Queen Anne	History	website, innovations and inventions around the world to make life better
Burke Museum of Natural History and Culture	University District	Natural history	Part of the University of Washington, includes fossils, natural history dioramas, Native American artifacts, Pacific Rim cultures exhibit, gems and minerals
Center for Wooden Boats	South Lake Union	Maritime	Historic wooden sailboats, rowboats and other boats, locations in Lake Union Park and Cama Beach State Park
Center on Contemporary Art	Seattle	Art	website, contemporary exhibitions at various locations
Chihuly Garden and Glass	Lower Queen Anne	Art	Studio glass of Dale Chihuly, located in the Seattle Center
Coast Guard Museum Northwest	SoDo	Military	Includes U.S. Coast Guard ship models, uniforms, photos and artifacts
Connections Museum	Georgetown	Technology	website Working telephone switching systems, old telephones and payphones, teletypes
Daybreak Star Cultural Center	Magnolia	Art	Native American art gallery and cultural center operated by United Indians of All Tribes
Museum of Pop Culture	Lower Queen Anne	Media	Popular culture, includes rock & roll and popular music memorabilia, interactive exhibits, Science Fiction Museum and Hall of Fame
Frye Art Museum	First Hill	Art	website, Painting and sculpture from the nineteenth century to the present
Georgetown Steam Plant	Georgetown	Technology	Steam engines in the former power plant
Giant Shoe Museum	Downtown	Commodity	Located in Pike Place Market, collection of giant shoes
Henry Art Gallery	University District	Art	The art museum of the University of Washington, includes rotating exhibitions of contemporary art
History House of Greater Seattle	Fremont	History - Local	History and heritage of Seattle and its neighborhoods
Jack Straw New Media Gallery	University District	Art	website, non-profit multidisciplinary audio arts center
Klondike Gold Rush National Historical Park	Pioneer Square	History	Seattle's role in the Klondike Gold Rush
Last Resort Fire Department Museum	Downtown	Firefighting	website, vintage fire trucks, equipment, uniforms, located at the HQ for the Seattle Fire Department
Log House Museum	West Seattle	Local history	website, operated by the Southwest Seattle Historical Society
Museum of Flight	South	Aerospace	Incorporates Boeing's original manufacturing plant, the largest private air and space museum in the world includes private and military aircraft
Museum of History and Industry	South Lake Union	History	Washington's history and culture. Largest heritage organization in the State of Washington, with a collection of over 4 million artifacts, photographs, and archival materials, primarily related to the history of Seattle and the greater Puget Sound region.
National Nordic Museum; formerly known as Nordic Heritage Museum	Ballard	Ethnic - Nordic	Heritage of Seattle's Danish, Finnish, Icelandic, Norwegian and Swedish immigrants; expanded in 2018 with a new building and permanent exhibition focused on a broader understanding of Nordic life and culture as it has evolved over the last twelve thousand years.
Northwest African American Museum	Central District	Ethnic - African American	African American heritage in the Northwest
Northwest Nikkei Museum	Central District	Ethnic	Operated by the Japanese Cultural Community Center, heritage and history of the Pacific Northwest’s Nikkei community
Northwest Seaport	South Lake Union	Maritime	Includes the Arthur Foss tugboat, Lightship 83
Olympic Sculpture Park	Downtown	Art	9-acre sculpture park
Pacific Science Center	Lower Queen Anne	Science	Exhibits include health, dinosaurs, space, human body, Puget Sound, technology
Photographic Center Northwest	Capitol Hill	Art	website, includes a contemporary photography gallery
Pioneer Association of the State of Washington	Madison Park	History, Genealogy, Library	https://wapioneers.com/, Oldest history organization in the State of Washington, meeting since 1871, incorporated 1895; headquarters at historic 1910 Washington Pioneer Hall on the shores of Lake Washington; Pioneer Hall is on the United States National Park Service register of Historic Places.
Seattle Art Museum	Downtown	Art	3 facilities: main museum with diverse collections, Seattle Asian Art Museum and the Olympic Sculpture Park
Seattle Asian Art Museum	Capitol Hill	Art	Asian art, facility of the Seattle Art Museum
Seattle Central College M. Rosetta Hunter Art Gallery	Capitol Hill	Art	website
Seattle Children's Museum	Lower Queen Anne	Children's	Located in the Seattle Center
Seattle Mariners Hall of Fame	SoDo	Sports	Located at T-Mobile Park
Seattle Metropolitan Police Museum	Downtown	Law enforcement	History of policing in the Pacific Northwest
Seattle Pinball Museum	Chinatown-International District	Amusement	website, vintage pinball machines
Seattle University Galleries	First Hill	Art	Hedreen Gallery at the Lee Center for the Arts, Kinsey Gallery, Vachon Gallery
Steamship Virginia V	South Lake Union	Maritime	1922 steamship
The Unity Museum	University District	Envisioning One Humanity	website
Wing Luke Museum	Chinatown-International District	Ethnic - Pan Asian Pacific American	Culture, art and history of Asian Pacific Americans

== Defunct museums ==
- Consolidated Works, closed in 2006
- Milepost 31, closed 2017, website, history of Pioneer Square and the construction of the Alaskan Way Viaduct replacement tunnel, featured model of Bertha (tunnel boring machine)
- Museum of Mysteries, closed in 2014, collections now online as the Northwest Museum of Legends and Lore
- Odyssey Maritime Discovery Center, closed in 2008
- Western Bridge, closed in 2012
- Wright Exhibition Space, closed in 2014, collections now at Seattle Art Museum
- Museum of Museums, closed in 2023
- Living Computer Museum closed in 2020 due to Covid-19 and final announcement of permanent closure occurred in 2024

== See also ==
- List of museums in Washington (state)
- Seattle Aquarium
