= Marina Park (Kirkland) =

City park

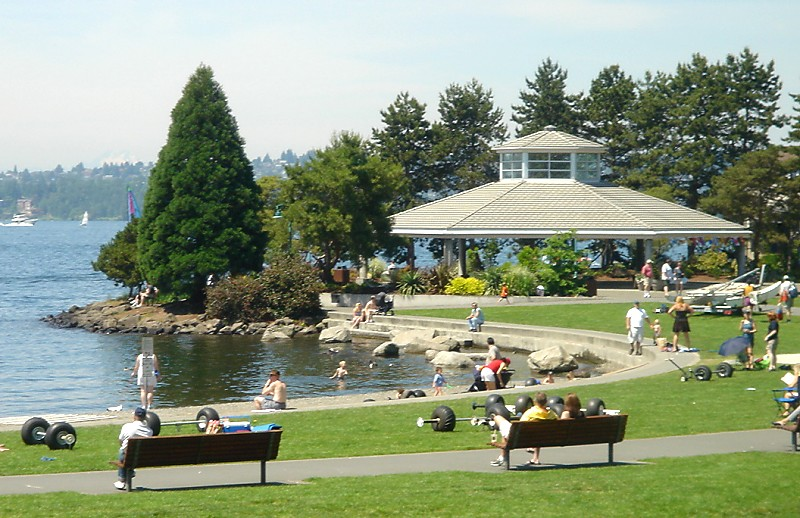
- Allen Locke Pavilion in Marina Park
- Interactive map of Marina Park
- Location: Kirkland, Washington, U.S.
- Coordinates: 47°40′31″N 122°12′33″W
- Established: 1970

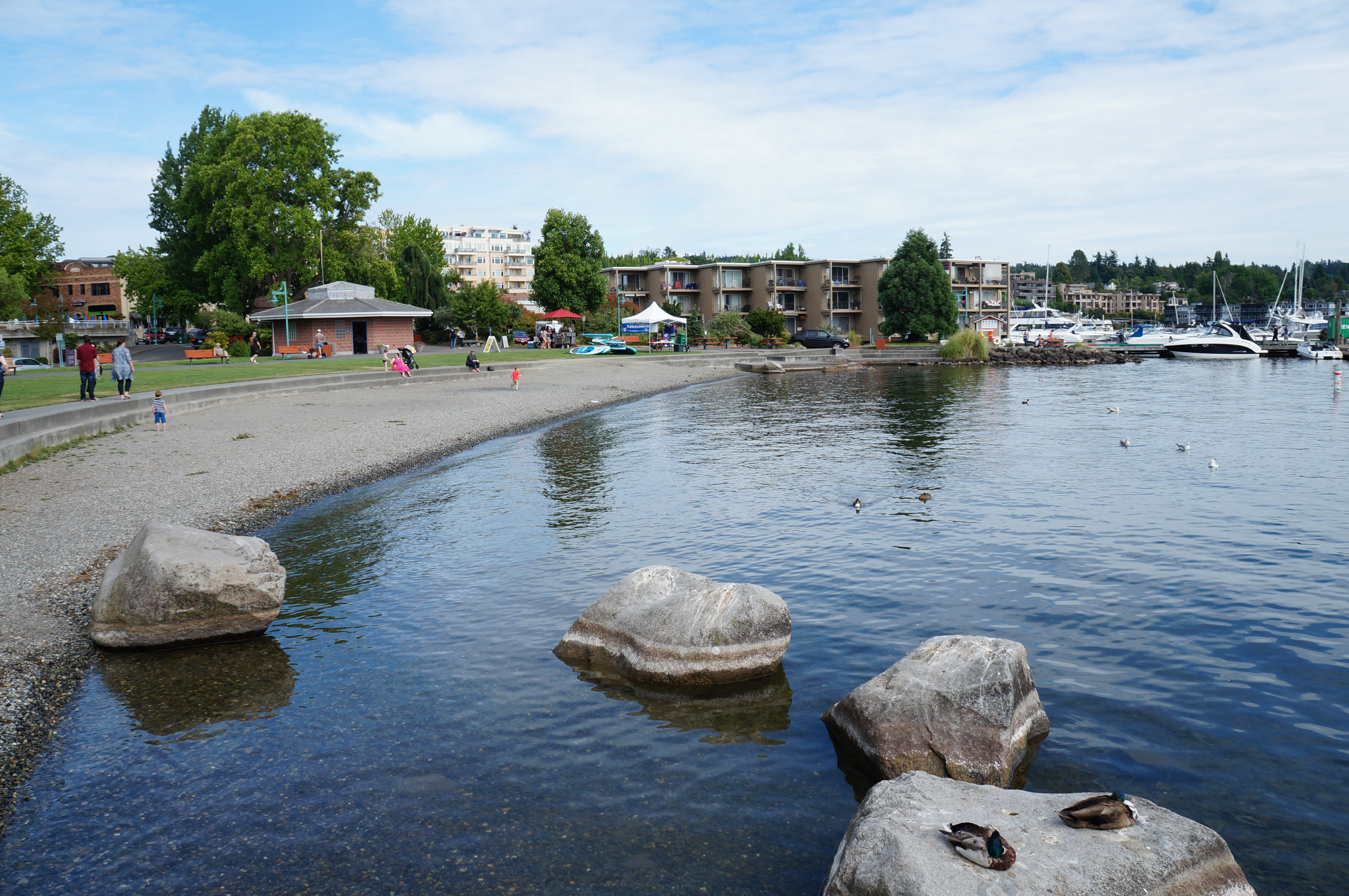
The beach at Marina Park

Marina Park is a 3.6-acre (1.5 ha) waterfront park located on the northeast shore of Lake Washington in the Kirkland, Washington central waterfront district, managed by the city of Kirkland in the United States. The park, dubbed "Lake Washington's Great Port-of-Call" by boosters in the twentieth century, sits at the foot of the city's historic Market Street district on Moss Bay and features a number of public amenities. The park has been described as "the most prominent public feature in downtown Kirkland."

Allen Locke Pavilion, a "well-known landmark," is situated in Marina Park and serves as a symbol of the city of Kirkland, as depicted on the official logo of the city.

== History ==
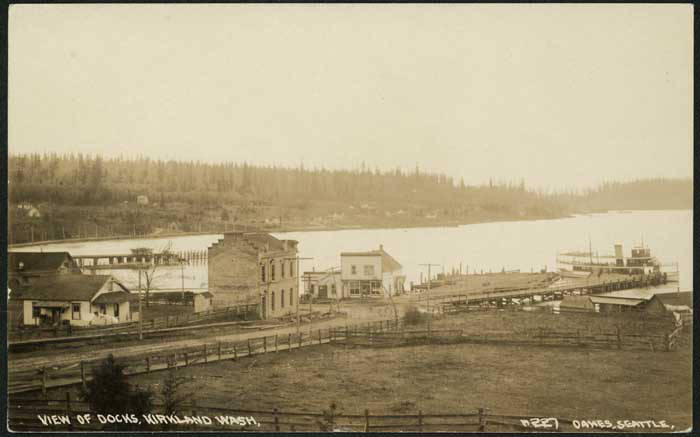
The vicinity of Marina Park in 1909, including the Kirkland Ferry Terminal

Marina Park is situated at the center of downtown Kirkland on a stretch of Lake Washington waterfront that has been called Moss Bay since the founding of the city by Englishman Peter Kirk and his business associates, who chose to name it for the Mossbay area of Workington, England from which they hailed. The Moss Bay area was the site of the Kirkland Ferry Terminal in the early twentieth century, as well as the terminus of the cross-country Yellowstone Road. In 1935, ferry owner John L. Anderson donated a large clock to the city for the purpose of facilitating ferry traffic. The historic clock, which once stood at the terminal in what is now Marina Park, is situated 300 feet (91 m) north at the corner of Kirkland Avenue and Central Way. The 1930s era ferry wharf began to fall into disrepair following the opening of the Lacey V. Murrow Memorial Bridge in 1940, with the last ferry crossing the lake in 1950, and was left to rot at the present site of the park. Around this period, the marshy area along the Marina Park waterfront became the site of public pig races.

The Kirkland waterfront was largely industrial prior to revitalization efforts in the 1960s and 70s, including the area that is now Marina Park. The section of Moss Bay that now forms the park was described as a "big dump" prior to the late 1960s by the city's then-mayor, Bill Woods, serving as a home for lumberyards, shipyards, and a courtesy moorage called Kirkland Marine Park. The city purchased the current park's central two acres in the mid-1950s when it was still a swampy area that served as a dumping ground for raw sewage and was cordoned off from the street by cement blocks. Local historian Bob Neir has described this purchase as a "swindle." In 1968, however, King County residents voted to approve a $118 million parks and recreation bond that saw the restoration and cleaning of Lake Washington, including the Kirkland waterfront.

Allen Locke, who served as the first city manager of Kirkland from 1968 to 1985 after the city adopted a council-manager form of government, led Kirkland to adopt a major overhaul of the parks system in his first year in office, which included a plan for Marina Park. In 1970, Kirkland voters approved a $99,000 bond and the federal government issued a $328,000 grant to the city for the enactment of Locke's parks plan. Marina Park opened in November 1970 as the central waterfront park in the city of Kirkland, situated at the heart of what would be developed as downtown Kirkland in the succeeding decades. The central, open-air gazebo-style pavilion was erected in that same year as part of the development plan, quickly becoming a landmark. The pavilion was torn down and re-built in 1995, this time with a lighthouse-style cupola atop it. The park was recognized for its transformation in 1971 with an award from the Cascade Chapter of the American Society of Landscape Architects in the public works category. The development of the land as a waterfront park was evaluated as part of a 1990 study of urban waterfront revitalization programs conducted by the Oregon State University coastal resources program, published as a guide to such programs for use by other small waterfront cities. It is cited as a key piece of the "repaired" suburban city of Kirkland in A Better Place to Live: Reshaping the American Suburb by scholar Philip Langdon, a member of the Congress for the New Urbanism. Langdon credits the creation of the park as playing a key role in encouraging and facilitating the increased pedestrianization of the entire Kirkland downtown, as it provides a central focal point to which various intentionally-designed walking paths to other pedestrianized areas can converge.

In 1972, the city commissioned the Centennial Fountain sculpture, which was erected by noted Seattle-based sculptor James FitzGerald in honor of the city's founding in 1872. The work was the first municipal piece of art in the city of Kirkland, funded by a local women's service club. More public art was installed in the late 1980s and early 1990s. Starting in the 1970s, the park became a central part of civic life in Kirkland, playing host to events like the city's Fourth of July festivities and the annual Moss Bay Days festival. It was cited as a central part of the transformation of Kirkland into a waterfront-oriented city. Prior to the creation of Marina Park and other Kirkland waterfront parks, many Eastside communities had "turned their backs" on Lake Washington. The core of the Kirkland waterfront was built up around the park by developers in the second half of the twentieth century, an effect which has been cited by local leaders as having been downstream of the revitalization efforts at the park.

Public access to the water at the beach has been restricted due to the presence of fecal coliform bacteria several times, including 2013 and 2016. In May 2013, the King County Wastewater Treatment Division reported that 68,000 gallons of sewage from the Kirkland Pump Station entered the lake at Marina Park. In June 2016, elevated levels of fecal matter were detected at the park, restricting access to the water once again.

In March 2018, the Kirkland City Council voted unanimously to rename the pavilion in Marina Park after the late Allen Locke, who had a prominent role in the redevelopment of the city's waterfront and Marina Park in particular. The park, including the re-named pavilion, won Best Park in the 2020 edition of the annual Kirkland Reporter Best of Kirkland awards.

== Features ==
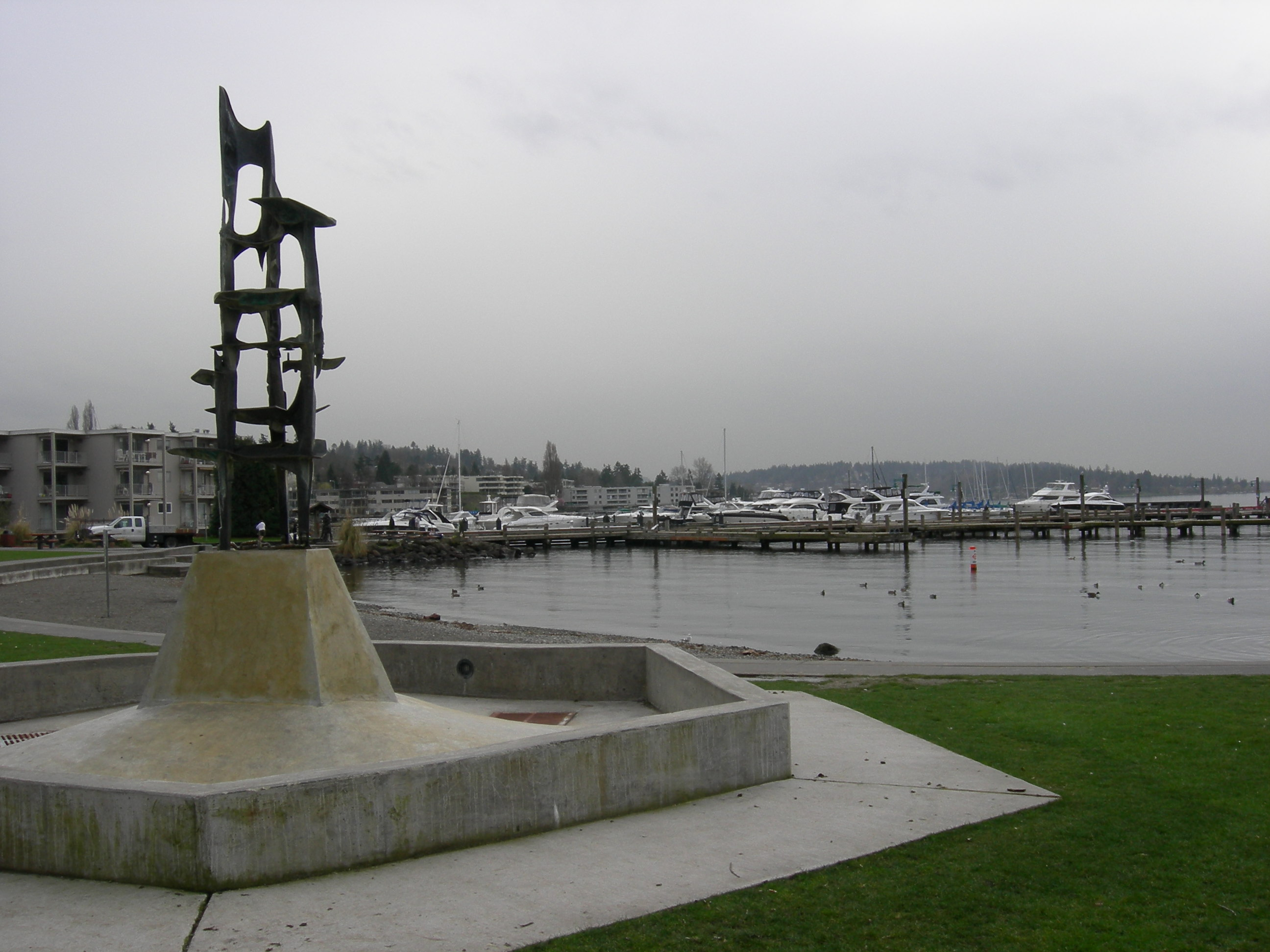
Centennial Fountain by James FitzGerald

Marina Park has been described by The Seattle Times as the "showcase" of the Kirkland waterfront park system. It features a sand beach, a public path stretching from the public dock and marina at the south end of the park to the Allen Locke Pavilion and a public boat launch at the north end. There is a grassy berm descending from the central business district, lined with benches and tables. At the south entrance to the park, adjacent to the public bathhouse, there is a work of decorative concrete created by The Portico Group in the 1990s, which depicts a compass rose pointing to various areas of the park and has been highlighted by the American Society of Landscape Architects' Landscape Architecture Magazine.

The park features two of Kirkland's ten public fishing piers authorized by the Washington Department of Fish and Wildlife, one of which is adjacent to the public boat ramp, from which both motorized and non-motorized vessels are authorized to launch. The marina has 82 year-round moorage slips which are available for the public to rent, and is recognized as one of the primary ship and boat portages in the eastern Puget Sound region by Northwest Boat Travel. The marina's Kirkland City Dock, the other authorized public fishing pier at the park, also serves as a point of departure and arrival for Argosy Cruises, a major tourist attraction in the Seattle area which offers a similar service to the old Lake Washington ferry fleet. The historic MV Kirkland (1924) was part of the Argosy fleet and was frequently docked at the Kirkland Marina until a fire significantly damaged it in 2010. The marina has served as the home port for a number of historic ships throughout its history, including the three-masted schooner Wawona (1897), the tug Arthur Foss (1889), and the United States Coast Guard lightship Relief (1950).

Marina Park features a number of pieces of public art, including bronze-cast replicas of Puddlejumpers by Glenna Goodacre (1989) and The Homecoming Stanley Bleifeld (1989), as well as James FitzGerald's Centennial Fountain (1972). Puddlejumpers has been described by the Vancouver Columbian as "Kirkland's most popular sculpture". It has been home to the Kirkland Plaza of Champions since 1988, where bronze plaques are installed in public ceremonies to honor Kirkland residents and organizations who have had a major impact in their field or in the local community. Honorees include JoAnne Carner, Rick Colella, and the 1982 World Champion Kirkland National Little League team.

The park currently hosts a weekly farmers' market in summer months as well as public cultural events throughout the year, including the Kirkland Summer Concert Series, Summerfest, Oktoberfest, the Kirkland Uncorked wine festival, and the city's annual July 4 Celebration. There are seasonal equipment rentals at the park as well, including kayaks and standup paddleboards.

In 2022, the Council on Vertical Urbanism published a proposal for a vertically-oriented urban redevelopment program centered on Marina Park in its CTBUH Journal. On August 7, 2024, the city council adopted a project design proposal for improvements to Marina Park, mainly for pier and shoreline erosion repairs, accessibility, and general maintenance. Summer 2027 is the target for these renovations to begin.
