= Peasley =

Peasley is a surname. Notable people with the surname include:

- Aaron Peasley (1775–1837), American button maker
- Andrew Peasley (born 2000), American football player
- Cheryl Peasley (born 1951), Australian sprinter
- Ed Peasley (born c. 1935), American football player and coach
- Marv Peasley (1889–1948), American baseball player
- Ralph Erksine Peasley (1866–1948), American sea captain on whom fictional captain Matt Peasley is based

== Fictional characters ==
- Prince Peasley, character in videogame Mario & Luigi: Superstar Saga
- Matt Peasley, sea captain in writings of Peter B. Kyne, based on Ralph Erksine Peasley

== See also ==
- Paisley (name)
- Peaslee, a surname
- Peisley
- Peasley Cross, area of Sutton, St Helen's, Lancashire, England

- Peasley Cross railway station
