= Paisley (name) =

- Gender: unisex

Origin
- Origin: Scottish
- Meaning: church

Other names
- See also: Paislee, Paisleigh

Paisley is an English and Scottish surname and a given name derived from the surname. The name is rising in popularity in English speaking countries such as the United States, where it has ranked among the top 1,000 names for newborn girls since 2006 and has ranked among the top 50 names for girls in recent years. It is a name that is notably more commonly used by whites in rural states in the United States than in urban areas. Spelling variants are also well-used.

Notable people named Paisley include:

== Given name ==
- Paisley Currah, Canadian academic
- Paisley Dodds, American editor
- Paisley Rekdal, American poet
- Paisley Wu (born 1971), Hong Kong singer and television presenter

== Surname ==
- Bob Paisley, English football manager
- Brad Paisley (born 1972), American country singer
- Chris Paisley (born 1986), English golfer
- David Paisley (born 1979), Scottish actor
- Doug Paisley, Canadian folk singer
- Eileen Paisley, Baroness Paisley of St George's (born 1931), Northern Ireland politician
- Grégory Paisley (born 1977), French footballer
- Ian Paisley (1926–2014), Northern Ireland politician and church leader
- Ian Paisley Jr (born 1966), Northern Ireland politician, son of Ian
- Jackie Paisley, American bodybuilder
- Janet Paisley (1948–2018), Scottish writer, poet and playwright
- John Paisley (actor), Scottish actor working in China
- John Paisley (CIA officer), CIA officer
- Kimberly Williams-Paisley (born 1971), American actress
- Michelle Paisley (born 1968), American author
- Rebecca Paisley, American author
- Rhonda Paisley (born 1960), Northern Ireland author and politician
- Stephen Paisley (born 1983), Irish football player
- Una Paisley (1922–1977), Australian cricket player

== Stage names ==
- Paisley (wrestler), Sharmell Sullivan-Huffman, American professional wrestler performing as "Paisley"

== See also ==
- Peisley
- Peasley
