= Cappy Ricks =

1921 film

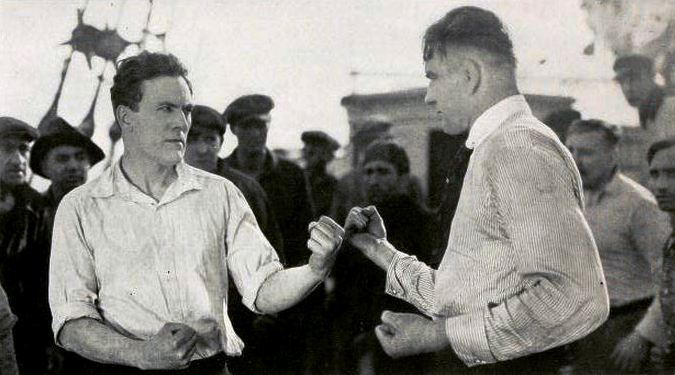
- Film still
- Directed by: Tom Forman
- Screenplay by: Peter B. Kyne; Albert S. Le Vino; Edward E. Rose; Waldemar Young
- Produced by: Adolph Zukor
- Starring: Thomas Meighan; Charles S. Abbe; Agnes Ayres; Hugh Cameron; John St. Polis; Paul Everton; Eugenie Woodward
- Cinematography: Harry Perry
- Production company: Famous Players–Lasky Corporation
- Distributed by: Paramount Pictures
- Release date: August 21, 1921
- Running time: 60 minutes
- Country: United States
- Language: Silent (English intertitles)

Cappy Ricks is a 1921 American silent adventure film directed by Tom Forman and written by Peter B. Kyne, Albert S. Le Vino, Edward E. Rose, and Waldemar Young. The film stars Thomas Meighan, Charles S. Abbe, Agnes Ayres, Hugh Cameron, John St. Polis, Paul Everton and Eugenie Woodward. The film was released on August 21, 1921, by Paramount Pictures. On Broadway in the 1919 season, the play version starred William Courtenay and Tom Wise.

== Cast ==
- Thomas Meighan as Matt Peasley
- Charles S. Abbe as Cappy Ricks
- Agnes Ayres as Florrie Ricks
- Hugh Cameron as Murphy
- John St. Polis as Skinner
- Paul Everton as Captain Kendall
- Eugenie Woodward as Mrs. Peasley
- Tom O'Malley as Captain Jones
- Ivan Linow as Ole Peterson
- William Wally as Swenson
- John Francis Dillon as Larsen
- Gladys Granger as Doris

== Production ==
The wrecked ship scenes were filmed off the coast of Boston.

== Survival status ==
It is not known whether Cappy Ricks currently survives. The Library of Congress database of American silent films lists an incomplete print of the film as preserved in the UCLA Film & Television Archive.
