= Old Seattle Paperworks =

Shop at Pike Place Market in Seattle, Washington, U.S.

- Logo
- Location: 1501 Pike Pl # 424, Seattle, WA 98101; Seattle, Washington, United States; 47.60882°N 122.34111°W
- Opening date: 1976
- Owner: John Hanawalt
- Website: oldseattlepaperworks.com
- Interactive map of Old Seattle Paperworks

Old Seattle Paperworks is a shop at Seattle's Pike Place Market, in the U.S. state of Washington.

== Description ==
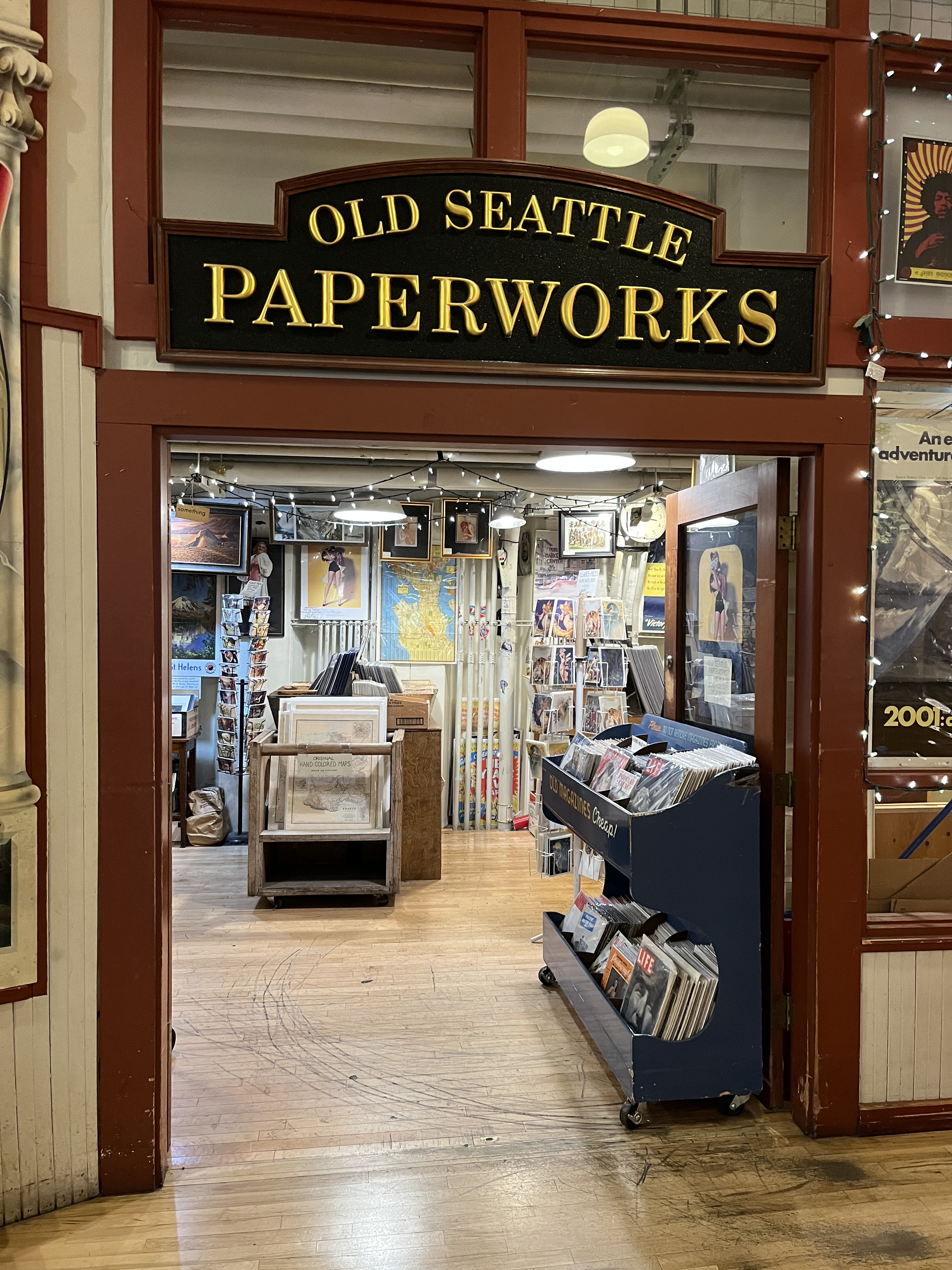
The shop's entrance in 2022

Old Seattle Paperworks is a shop in the Down Under part of Pike Place Market, in Seattle's Central Waterfront district. The shop is next to the Giant Shoe Museum, which National Geographic Traveler has said is owned and operated by Old Seattle Paperworks. Business Insider has described the shop as an "old-fashioned paper retailer" with "vintage advertising, poster art, maps, magazines, and newspapers". The business stocks magazine advertisements, postcards, and other ephemera.

== History ==
John Hanawalt established in business in 1976. The shop relocated from the intersection of Eighth and Pike Streets to Pike Place Market in 1978. Hanawalt was an owner as of 2013, and his wife Amy helped run the store.

== Reception ==
Lonely Planet has said, "If you like decorating your home with old magazine covers from Life, Time and Rolling Stone, or have a penchant for art-deco tourist posters from the 1930s, or are looking for that rare Hendrix concert flyer from 1969, this is your nirvana." The Not for Tourists Guide to Seattle has said "one could spend hours sifting through" the store's products. In National Geographic Traveler: Coastal Alaska (2016), Bob Devine called Old Seattle Paperworks a "Seattle institution".

Thrillist says, "Old Seattle Paperworks gives you a glimpse into what old Seattle was like, with kitschy art of times long gone. From postcards to vintage prints and old magazines, there is no shortage wall space to feast your eyes on in here -- think of it as a no cover mini museum." In the website's 2014 "Local's Guide to Seattle's Pike Place Market", Chona Kasinger wrote, "Boasting kitschy art from times gone by, OSP sells everything from vintage postcards to old magazines, but the highlight is a massive collection of posters that would've impressed the girls you brought back to your dorm wayyy more than that wall of PBR labels."
