= Peaslee =

Peaslee is a surname. Notable people with the surname include:

- Charles H. Peaslee (1804–1866), U.S. Representative from New Hampshire
- Horace Peaslee (1884–1959), American architect and landscape designer
- Janice L. Peaslee (born 1935), American politician
- John Peaslee (c. 1951–2024), American screenwriter and producer
- Richard Peaslee (1930–2016), composer for the theatre in London
- Robert J. Peaslee (1864–1936), American lawyer and judge

== See also ==
- Janice Peaslee Bridge, a pin-connected steel & wrought iron Pratt through truss bridge connecting Stratford, New Hampshire to Maidstone, Vermont
- Peasley, a surname
