= Foss Maritime =

Shipping company based in Tacoma, Washington, U.S.

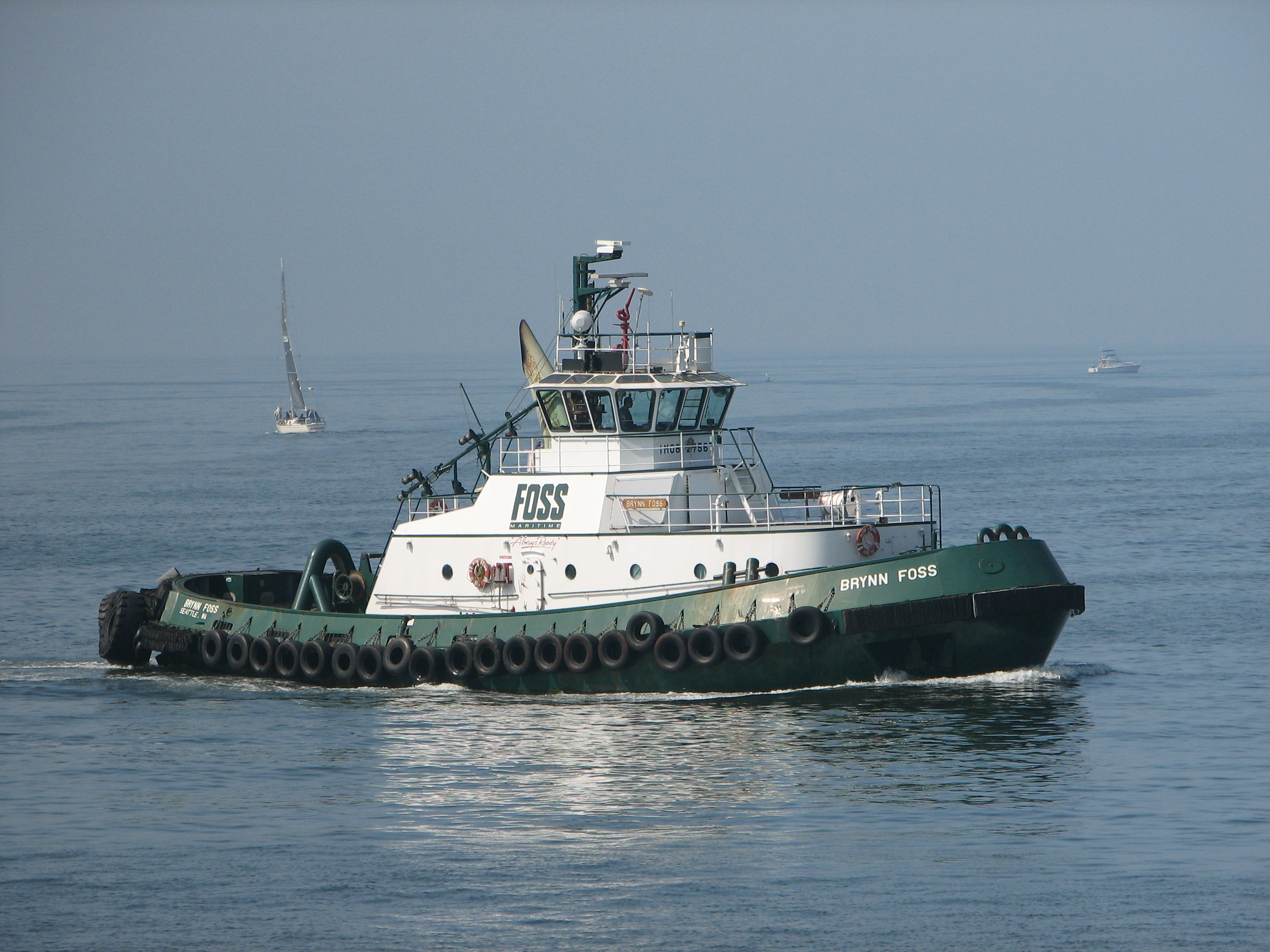
- Brynn Foss in Redondo Beach, California
- Genre: Tug, barge, and towing
- Founded: 1889
- Founder: Thea Foss, Andrew Foss
- Headquarters: United States
- Key people: John Parrott, CEO
- Owner: Saltchuk
- Website: foss.com

Foss Maritime (formerly Foss Launch and Tug Company), is an American tugging company. The company was founded in 1889 by Thea Foss (1857–1927) and her husband Andrew Foss. The company is now the largest tug and towing concern on the west coast of the United States.

On July 2, 2013, Foss Marine Holdings announced that (effective at that date) it would merge all of its operations and resources under a single name: 'Foss Maritime Company'.

== Founding and early years ==
The Foss concern began in 1889 with a single rowboat which Thea Foss rented by the day in Tacoma, Washington while her husband Andrew, a builder, was working on a construction project. At the end of the building, the Fosses realized that Thea's boat had made them more money than Andrew's carpentry. They acquired more boats and soon began operating larger vessels, branching out into sailboats, naptha launches, gasoline-engined vessels, and scows and barges. By 1916 Foss Launch and Tug Company bought Captain O.G. Olson's Tacoma towing business, including the steam tugs Echo, Elf, and Olympian. When Thea Foss died in 1927, the company owned 27 gasoline, diesel, and steam powered vessels, and numerous unpowered barges.

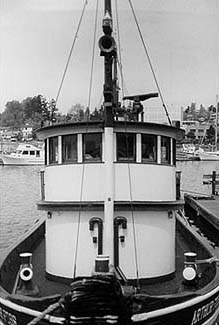
Arthur Foss; built 1889, retired 1968, now owned by Northwest Seaport

== Later years ==
Foss was purchased by Saltchuk in 1987. In 2021, the company announced the closure of their shipyard on Seattle's Lake Washington Ship Canal.

== Early vessels ==
Foss Maritime started out only with rowboats with their signature white and green trim paint. Soon Foss started expanding their venue of work. They saw what the people of Washington wanted, so they expanded to developing towing tugs. Some of their first powered vessels were built by the hands of the Foss family itself. Her first power vessel was the St. Patrick, a steamer that operated in the Commencement Bay. The steamer ran aground, and was fully rebuilt by Thea's carpenter husband. The boat was then sold for another steamer. Their second powered vessel was Lizzie A. This was one of the worst boats the Foss family ever owned and they quickly sold the unreliable vessel for $500.

One of the most important ships that is still seen today in the Puget Sound area is the vessel called Hope. This was a naphtha-fueled vessel that solely operated rafting giant Douglas Fir logs in the sound area.

== Bay Area ==
On September 1, 1993, Foss Maritime expanded into the San Francisco Bay Area, maintaining a pool of vessels and barges for Tug/Barge escort, docking, and other services in conjunction with SeaRiver maritime. Today Foss provides three large conventional SeaRiver tugs and one Foss cycloidal tractor tug. The Foss SeaRiver Tug office is located at 150A West Industrial Way, Benicia, CA 94510-1016.

== Current officers ==
- Will Roberts, President and COO

== Hybrid technology ==
In recent times, Foss Maritime has been working on lowering their NOx and carbon dioxide emissions. Foss constructed a hybrid tug, Caroline Dorothy, to reduce atmospheric pollution. Their hybrid craft cuts down as much as 44% of harmful emissions dispersed into the atmosphere. In July 2013, Foss announced to retrofit a third tug.

== Other new developments ==
Foss Maritime developed and built an ASD Z-Drive and Voith Schneider Propulsion cycloidal tractor tugs capable of working with the largest vessels in its operating area.

== Awards ==
In 2008, the United States Coast Guard awarded Foss Maritime its most prestigious environmental honor for developing the low-emission, hybrid tugboat Green Dolphin. The award was the William M. Benkert 'gold' award for their impact on the environment. Earlier, in June 2008, Foss won the Environmental Protection Agency's Clean Air Excellence Award, also for their green tug. Foss also received a Commendation-Environmental Award from BP Shipping and an honorable mention for the 2008 Port of Seattle Environmental Business of the Year award. Foss has maintained their green technology. Recently, the company has been working on bringing a sister ship hybrid tug into the ports of Los Angeles and Long Beach.
