= Kay Bullitt =

American education reformer (1925–2021)

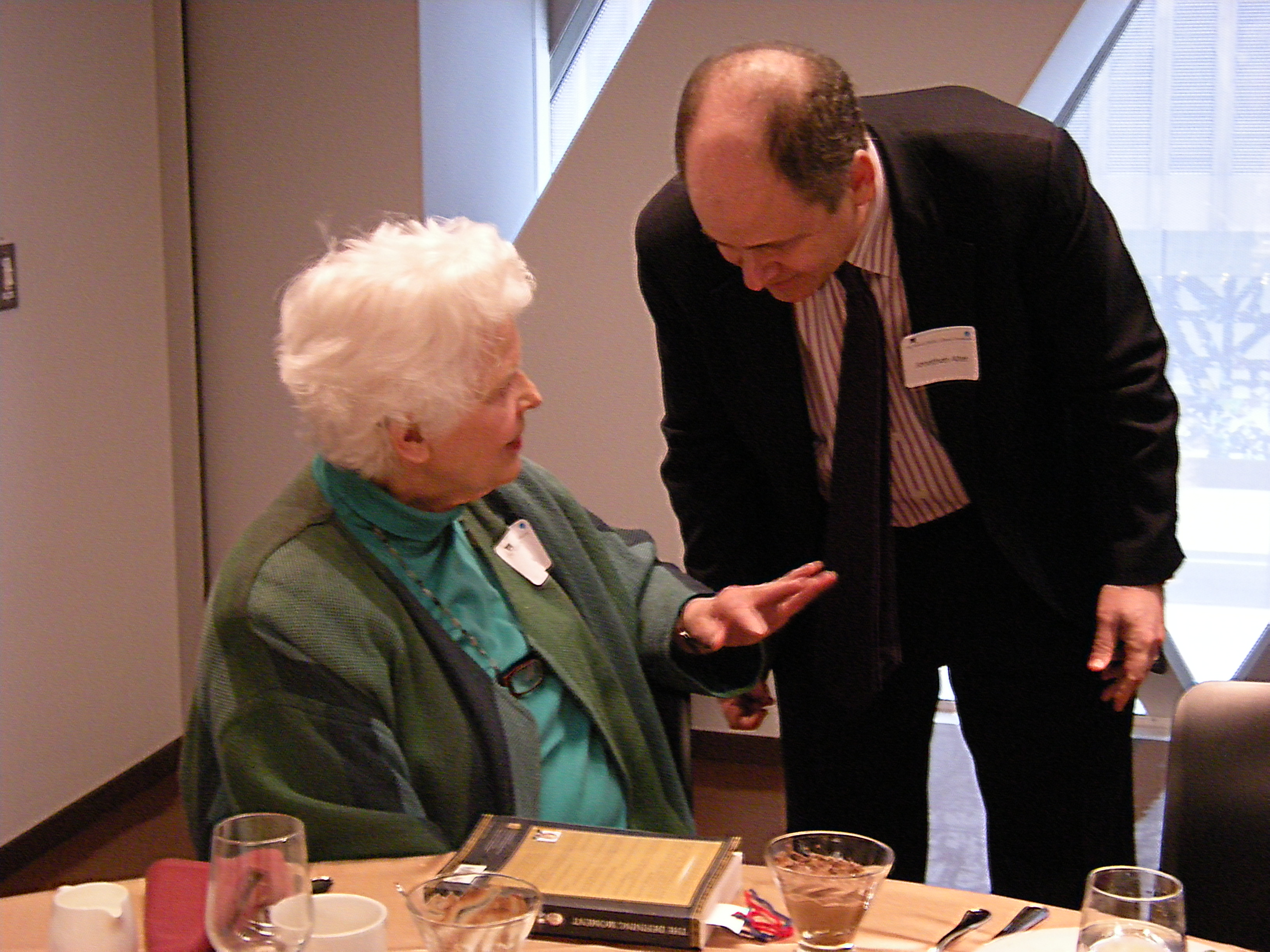
- Bullitt (left) with Jonathan Alter in 2009
- Born: Katharine Muller; February 22, 1925; Boston, Massachusetts, U.S.
- Died: August 22, 2021 (aged 96)
- Education: Radcliffe College
- Spouse: Charles Stimson Bullitt (m. 1954; div. 1979)
- Children: 3

Katharine Bullitt (née Muller; February 22, 1925 – August 22, 2021) was an American education reformer, civil rights activist, and philanthropist. Bullitt was instrumental in attempts to desegregate Seattle's public schools.

== Early life and education ==
Katharine Bullitt was born in 1925 in Boston and was raised in Arlington, Massachusetts, the daughter of Marion Churchill and William Augustus Muller. Her mother had a long career as dean of women at Colorado College before marrying in her late 30s and having three daughters. Kay was the middle child between Marion ("Barney") and Margaret ("Margie"). Bullitt attended Shady Hill School in Cambridge, Massachusetts.

Bullitt's interest in civic projects began early and focused on education and peace. She attended Radcliffe College, which both her mother and sister had attended. While in college, Bullitt worked in a community center in Cambridge which primarily served African-American children. Kay's sister had written her thesis on the difference between African-American students from Barbados and the South. Kay's own senior thesis was on the role of the federal government in education.

== Career ==
During World War II, Bullitt spent a summer at the Hampton Institute in Virginia as part of an interracial farm project. Bullitt was also active with the Massachusetts Fair Employment Practice.

After the end of World War II, Bullitt worked in Germany for two summers.

After college, Bullitt taught at the Shady Hill School in Cambridge, Massachusetts, which she had attended as a child. She taught the fourth grade there for five years. Inspired by the ability that she had observed in the young African-Americans she had worked with, Bullitt decided to take a trip across the country to observe what education and work experience was like for children. In her wanderings, Bullitt came to Seattle and decided to stay in 1951.

=== Desegregation in Seattle ===
In the 1960s, Bullitt hosted an integrated day camp at her home on Capitol Hill. At first, Bullitt said that the camp was "self-serving", as she had three older (step-)children and three under six, all with different interests. She recruited teachers and counselors from the League of Women Voters and The Little School in Seattle. From after the World's Fair in 1962 through the early seventies, the camp was integrated and grew to host 100 children and 35 teenagers running it.

Also during this time in the 1960s, Bullitt began work in Seattle to integrate schools through voluntary transfer. Her children were going to Lowell Elementary School in the Capitol Hill neighborhood and they began a partnership with Madrona School, a primarily African-American school in Seattle, and had about 50 children going between the schools. Bullitt also started the Voluntary Instruction Program (VIP) which brought in volunteers to teach subjects in small groups, starting with Madrona, but then went to other Central District schools. The program disappeared when they were unable to convince the district to fund a directorship position.

Bullitt briefly headed a program called School Affiliation Service which was based on her visits to Germany after World War II. Bullitt wanted to have people come from the South to see how the integration in Seattle was working. This program eventually evolved into the Coalition for Quality Integrated Education (CQIE) in 1968.

=== Wawona and other civic projects ===
In 1963, after reading an article in the local paper about the Wawona, an historic schooner, Bullitt began efforts to save and restore the ship. The 165 foot-long ship was launched in 1897 and was initially used to haul lumber up and down the Pacific coast. The schooner also served as a fishing schooner in the Bering Sea and was a military barge during World War II. After 46 years and numerous fundraising and volunteer efforts, it was determined it would be too costly to restore and they were unable to secure permanent moorage. The ship, which was profiled in Shipbuilders, Sea Captains and Fishermen by Joe Follansbee, was dismantled in 2009, with portions being saved for the Seattle Museum of History & Industry.

Bullitt was instrumental in founding several Civic and community projects in Seattle. She helped found Bumbershoot, an annual international music and arts festival in Seattle, which takes place every Labor Day Weekend at the Seattle Center. In the seventies, Bullitt helped found a savings and loan bank for women, called Sound Savings & Loan. Bullitt helped restore Pioneer Square.

In 1982, Bullitt, then a director of the Municipal League, helped organize Target Seattle, which was a week-long symposium on the dangers of nuclear war. Speakers included Louis Harris, David Brower, Dr. Jonas Salk, Dr. John E. Mack, Richard Wall Lyman, and Archibald Cox. The event finished with a speech by Cox at the Seattle Kingdome and with an attendance of 10,000– 20,000 people.

Bullitt has many awards including a United Nations Human Rights Prize and the Jefferson Awards for Public Service.

== Personal life ==
In 1954, Bullitt was introduced by friends in liberal Seattle political circles to Charles Stimson Bullitt, son of Dorothy Bullitt, the founder of King Broadcasting Company. Two weeks later he proposed marriage to her, and she accepted. Their marriage lasted for 25 years, ending in divorce in 1979.

In addition to her step-children, Ashley, Fred Nemo, and Jill, Kay and Stim had three more children: Dorothy, Benjamin (who preceded her in death), and Margaret.

Kay Bullitt died on August 22, 2021. She was 96 years old.

=== 1125 Harvard Avenue East ===
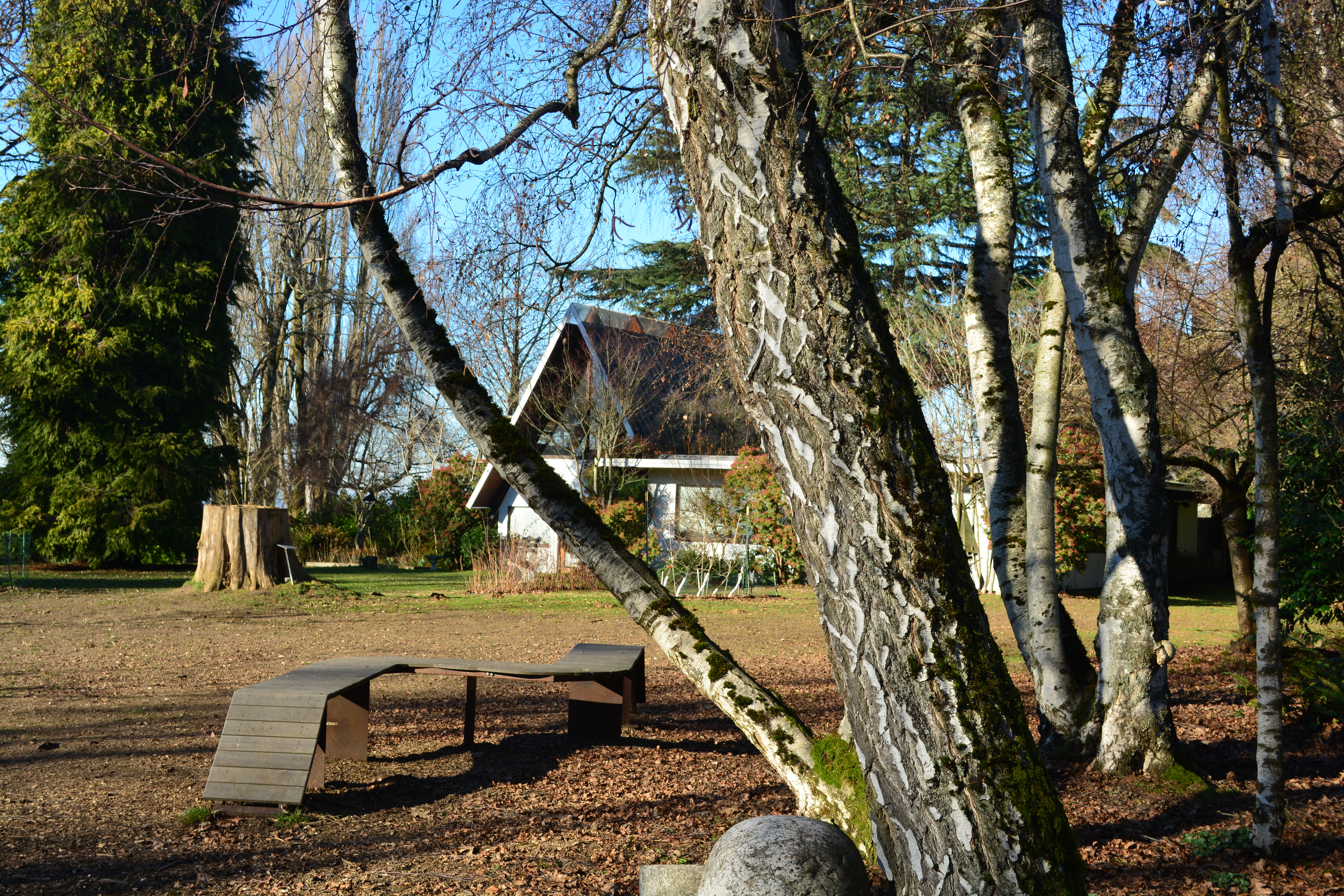
1125 Harvard Avenue East, photographed in 2022

Shortly before his marriage to Kay (his second, her first), Stimson Bullitt had acquired the property at 1125 Harvard Avenue East. The property had once been home to businessman, philanthropist and art collector Horace Chapin Henry. His sons donated the land to the city of Seattle for a library; the city demolished the house and swapped the land for a different parcel, and sold the land to Prentice Bloedel (son of Julius Bloedel), who lived in a mansion on the property immediately north. Bloedel sold the land (nearly two acres) to Stimson Bullitt on the condition that only one house could be built their in Prentice Bloedel's lifetime.

The house the couple had built was quite atypical for what was soon to become the Harvard-Belmont Landmark District. Designed by modern architect Fred Bassetti, it is a relatively simple A-frame, sometimes characterized as a "ski lodge."

Every year for 60 years, on Wednesday evenings in July, Bullitt hosted a picnic for family and friends at her Capitol Hill home. Bullitt also hosted Seattle's Middle East Peace Camp for Children for a number of years on the property. Bullitt, with her late former husband, Stimson Bullitt, donated the property to the city to be a park after her death.
