= Peisley =

Peisley is a surname. Notable people with the surname include:

- Frederick Peisley (1904–1975), British film and television actor
- John Peisley (politician) (1805–1871), Australian politician
- John Peisley (1835–1862), member of Australian Gardiner–Hall gang
- Mary Peisley (1718–1757), Irish Quaker writer

== See also ==
- Paisley (name)
- Peasley
