= United States lightship Swiftsure (LV-83) =

Ship of the United States

Swiftsure
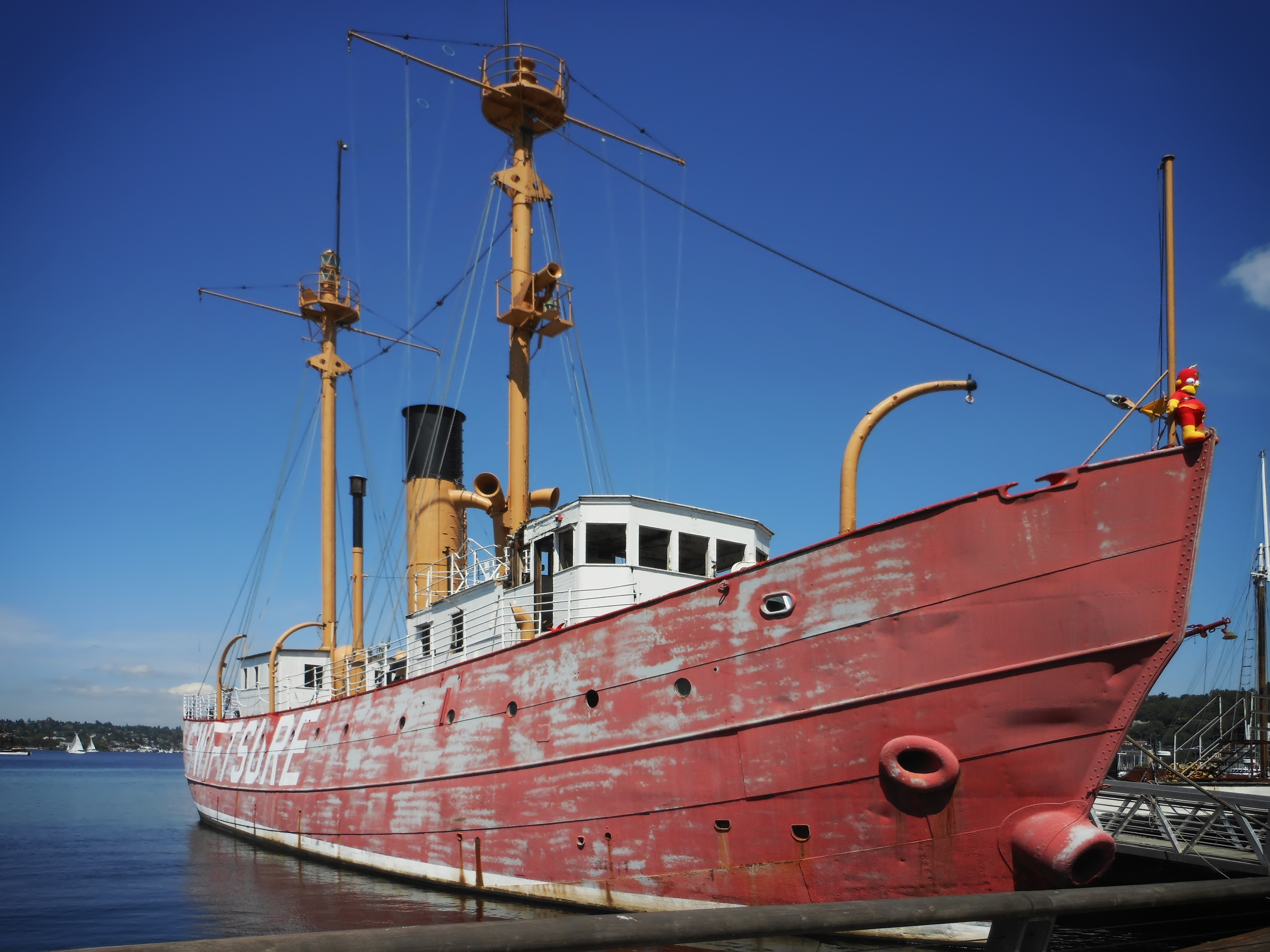
- Lightship No. 83, painted with the station name SWIFTSURE, in 2013

History

United States
- Name: Lightship No. 83; Lightship WAL-508
- Owner: U.S. Lighthouse Service (1904-1939); U.S. Coast Guard (1939-1941); U.S. Navy (1941-1945); U.S. Coast Guard (1945-1960); Northwest Seaport (1966-present)
- Builder: New York Shipbuilding Co.
- Cost: $85,000
- Launched: 1904
- Acquired: 1905
- Decommissioned: 18 July 1960
- Out of service: 1960
- Fate: Museum ship
- Status: Under restoration, on display
- Notes: Oldest lightship afloat in the United States

General characteristics
- Type: Lightship
- Displacement: 668 tons unloaded
- Length: 129 ft 6 in (39.47 m)
- Beam: 28 ft 6 in (8.69 m)
- Draft: 12 ft 6 in (3.81 m)
- Decks: 4
- Installed power: 2 Babcock & Wilcox sectional headed watertube boilers arranged for oil firing
- Propulsion: 1 double expansion 325 IHP reciprocating steam engine; auxiliary sail (pre-1931)
- Sail plan: Schooner rig on wood spencer masts (pre-1931)
- Speed: 9 knots (17 km/h; 10 mph)
- Crew: 11-15 (5 officers and 6-10 men)
- Notes: Only preserved lightship retaining its steam machinery and a wooden deck
- Lightship No. 83 "SWIFTSURE"
- U.S. National Register of Historic Places
- U.S. National Historic Landmark
- Seattle Landmark
- Location within Washington (state)
- Location: Historic Ships Wharf, Lake Union Park, Seattle, WA
- Coordinates: 47°37′41.31″N 122°20′12.72″W
- Area: less than one acre
- Built: 1904
- Architect: New York Shipbuilding Co.; US Lighthouse Establishment
- Architectural style: Riveted steel hull with wooden decks
- NRHP reference No.: 75001852

Significant dates
- Added to NRHP: 23 April 1975
- Designated NHL: 11 April 1989
- Designated SEATL: March 7, 1977

Light Vessel Number 83 (LV-83) Swiftsure is a lightship and museum ship owned by Northwest Seaport in Seattle, Washington. Launched in 1904 at Camden, New Jersey and in active service until 1960 after serving on all five of the American west coast's lightship stations, it is the oldest surviving lightship in the United States, the only one still fitted with its original steam engine, and the last lightship with wooden decks. LV-83 was designated a National Historic Landmark in 1989, and has been undergoing major restoration since 2008.

== Description ==
As built, LV-83 was a US third-generation lightship, with an all-steel hull, wooden decks, and a powerful double-expansion steam engine. It measured 112 feet (34 m) on the keel, 133 feet overall, with a beam of 28 feet 6 inches (8.69 m) and a draft of 12 feet 6 inches (3.81 m), and was rated at 668 tons. The beakhead roller on the bow was later removed, reducing length overall to 129 feet 6 inches.

The ship's aids to navigation currently include a 1,000-watt beacon light, a 140-decibel Diaphone horn, and a 1,000-pound (450 kg) foredeck fog bell. At the time of launching, however, the beacon consisted of a chandelier of three oil lamps that could be hoisted up the masts from the deck. These were originally powered by whale oil, then first converted to kerosene, and finally electrified in 1930. A 12-inch diameter steam whistle was the primary sound signaling device on board with the 1,000-lb bell standing by as the auxiliary. For a time, LV-83 was also fitted with an underwater bell with a mechanical striker that would strike out the ship's identity as a submarine signal. Sound carries much farther in water, extending the range of the ship's signals. The underwater bell was removed when a radio beacon was fitted on the ship for long-range signaling.

For propulsion, LV-83 was driven by a single 8-foot diameter screw powered by a 375-horsepower marine steam engine, originally fed by a pair of coal-fired fire-tube Scotch boilers. The ship had two coal bunkers, each with a capacity of 75 tons, and freshwater tankage for more than 11,000 gallons. In 1934, the Scotch boilers were replaced with modern oil-fired watertube boilers, improving endurance, speed of bunkering, and speed in raising steam while simultaneously reducing the size of the boiler room crew.

During active service, LV-83's normal crew complement was 15, with 10 on duty at any given time. The others were on shore leave rotation. Crew size did fluctuate slightly with technological modifications such as the labor saving oil-fired boilers or the successive waves of new electronic devices like radio and radar. During World War II, the ship's complement increased to more than 30 to man the guns fitted aboard for war duty.

== History ==
LV-83 was launched in Camden, New Jersey in 1904, and was deployed to the West Coast to serve on the Blunt's Reef lightship station. Since the Panama Canal would not be completed for another decade, LV-83 (accompanied by LV-76) had to steam around the tip of South America and north to San Francisco to reach its first station assignment at Blunts Reef off Cape Mendocino, California. While there, the ship rescued 150 people from the steamer Bear after that ship ran aground on the reef in dense fog.

Formerly known as Relief, LV-83 had numerous names on its sides, all of which indicated the location of its station. Swiftsure refers to the Swiftsure Bank near the entrance to the Strait of Juan de Fuca, which separates Washington from Vancouver Island. She also guided ships near Umatilla Reef and the Columbia River Bar.

The ship was decommissioned in 1960, and purchased by Northwest Seaport in 1966. It is listed on the National Register of Historic Places, was declared a National Historic Landmark in 1989, and is on the Washington State Heritage Register. LV-83 is docked on Lake Union, in Seattle, Washington, where a long-running restoration was begun in 2008. LV-83 is open to visitors on most summer weekends, or by appointment.

== See also ==
- List of National Historic Landmarks in Washington (state)
- National Register of Historic Places listings in Seattle, Washington
- Northwest Seaport
- Arthur Foss
- Wawona (schooner)
