= Giant Shoe Museum =

Museum in Seattle, Washington, U.S.

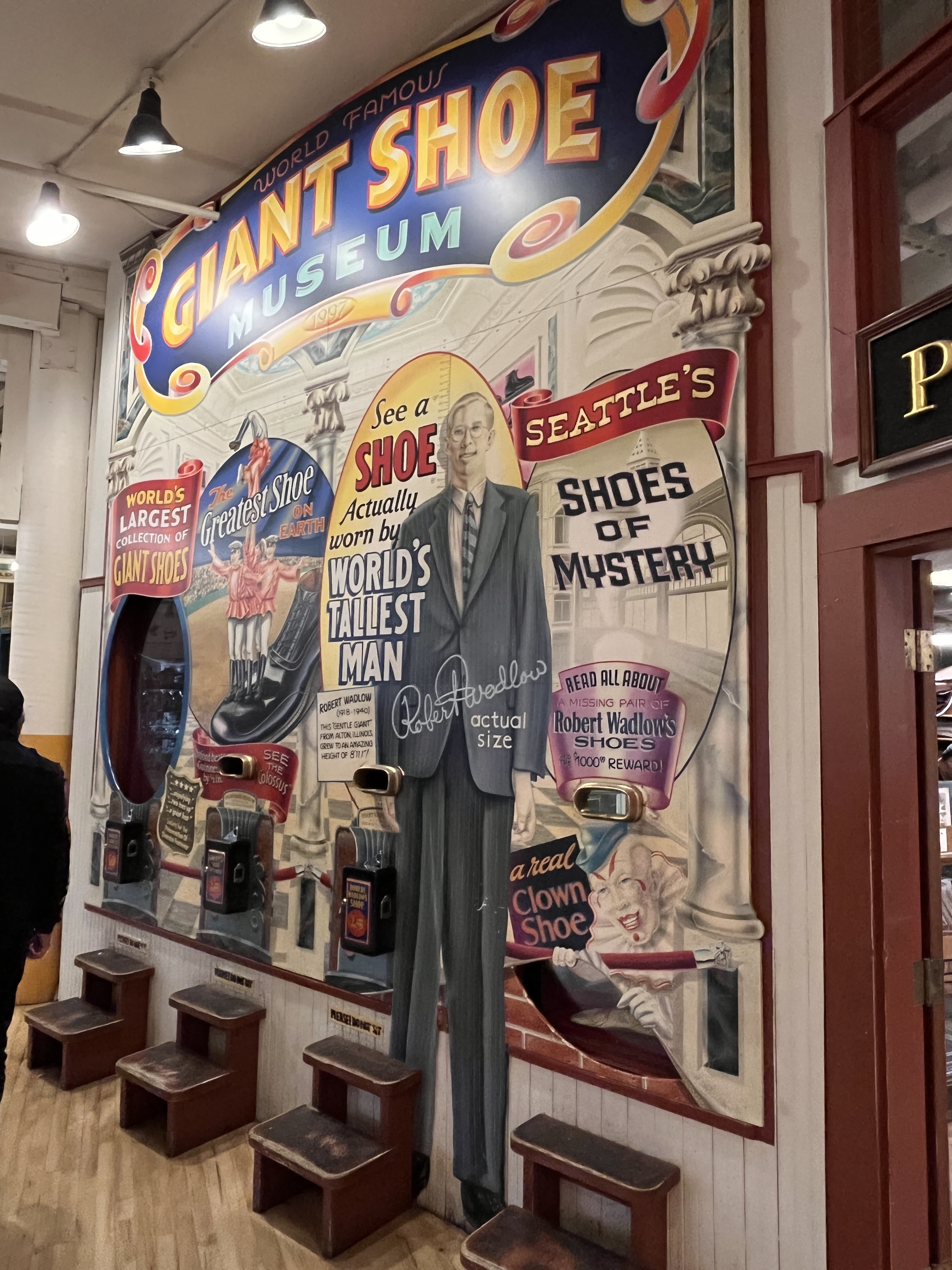
- The exhibit in 2022
- Location: Pike Place Market, Seattle, Washington, U.S.
- Coordinates: 47.6086°N 122.3407°W

Giant Shoe Museum (sometimes the World Famous Giant Shoe Museum) is a museum in Seattle's Pike Place Market, in the U.S. state of Washington.

== Description ==
The museum has "odd and outsize shoes displayed behind sideshow-style curtains", according to Harriet Baskas of CNBC. The one-wall exhibit allows guests to view shoes through a stereoscope. It has been described as "the world's largest collection of giant shoes", as well as "likely one of the world's few coin-operated museums".

== History ==
The museum was designed and built by Sven Sundbaum in 1997. Owned and operated by adjacent Old Seattle Paperworks, the exhibit is curated by Dan Eskenazi.

== Reception ==
Cody Permenter included the museum in Thrillist's 2015 list of "The 11 Strangest Museums in (and Around) Seattle". Christina Ausley of the Seattle Post-Intelligencer included the Giant Shoe Museum in a 2020 overview of the city's 14 "strangest" landmarks, writing: "Drop a humble 50 cents into a small coin box for the world's largest collection of giant shoes. Nestled a few floors below downtown Seattle's Pike Place Market, approach the flamboyant circus entryway and gaze through the binoculars for a myriad of Herculean hi-tops and a size 37 work by Robert Wadlow."

== See also ==
- List of museums in Seattle
