= Michelle Paisley =

American novelist

Michelle Paisley Reed
- Born: August 11, 1968 (age 58); Seattle, Washington, U.S.
- Education: California State University, Sacramento (BA)
- Occupation: Novelist
- Writing career
- Genres: Spirit channeling & Fiction
- Subjects: Yoga, Psyche & Spirituality
- Notable works: All in Her Head (2011), All Over It (2012)
- Website: www.michellepaisley.com

Michelle Paisley Reed (born August 11, 1968) is an American author who lives in Sacramento, California. She has published two novels, four non-fiction books, and four screenplays focused on the psyche and spirituality.

== Early life and education ==
Michelle Paisley Reed was born in Seattle, Washington on August 11, 1968. She attended high school in Fairfield, California, northeast of San Francisco, and graduated summa cum laude with a Bachelor of Arts degree in English from California State University, Sacramento.

== Career ==
After graduating from college in 1994, she worked as a reporter and features editor for the Benicia Herald and Contra Costa Times in Walnut Creek, CA. She then served as director of a non-profit enrichment program for children, program director for the Richmond YMCA and finally as director of Renaissance ClubSport in Walnut Creek.

In 2002, Paisley earned a Registered Yoga Teacher (500 hours) certification from Yoga Alliance and launched her own studio, Yoga Junction. It was originally located in Suisun City before moving to Green Valley. In 2005-2006 she worked on her first book after sending dozens of query letters, eventually publishing Yoga for a Broken Heart: A Spiritual Guide to Healing from Break-up, Loss, Death or Divorce with Findhorn Press in 2007.

In 2008, she was forced to change direction, so she obtained certifications as a Massage Therapist, Cranial Sacral Therapist, Bowen Therapist, and Hypnotherapist as well as studying EFT alternative medicine.

In between appointments at her 2009-2010 job, she gradually wrote her first novel, All in Her Head. Through what she described as a synchronistic Google event, she completed an agreement with the Strategic Book Group (the only publisher she contacted) within one week.

She has since owned a massage and yoga instruction studio, become a Reiki Master Therapist (Third Degree) and conducted a limited number of seminars entitled "Journey to Self-Love".

== Near death experience ==
At the age of 22, Paisley had a severe allergic reaction to a medication she was given and her heart stopped beating for several minutes. After this experience, she threw herself into the study and practice of yoga, hypnotherapy and meditation, searching for answers to her ordeal. After the publication of All in Her Head, she studied P.M.H. Atwater's 2011 book Near-Death Experiences, The Rest of the Story.

Some of the motivation and themes in Paisley's novel were born from this life-changing event.

== Selected works ==
=== Novels ===
- All in Her Head (2011)

All in Her Head journeys into the psyche of Bridget Holiday, a 41-year-old freelance writer who is obsessed with her weight. She meets a beginning hypnotherapist who wants to help her confront her inner demons, but she instead regresses back to a time before her birth, when she is still in what the book describes as "spirit" form. Her yoga teacher guides her through this new astral world, where she meets with her dead boyfriend. When faced with her own life-or-death crisis, Bridget realizes that her only hope is to embrace the life she is already living. Paisley describes the book's message as "learning to love your inner self... and (opening) yourself up to connect with your soul mate and with your dreams."

- All Over It (2012)

Returning protagonist Bridget Holiday thought she was at peace; she had reached her goal weight, met the love of her life, and found her life's purpose as manager of the healing arts center once owned by her former mentor, Rosalina. In fact, though, her weight progress proved ephemeral, her partner hadn't proposed after three years, and she was again broke and miserable. With her aging parents ill, Bridget has to struggle with deep emotions that she thought she had overcome, learning to "(remember) the eternal nature of spirit and her joy’s resilience."

=== Power of 10 books ===
- Manifesting Miracles and Money: How to Achieve Peace, Purpose, and Plenty Without Getting in Your Own Way (2017)
- Peace is Power: A Course in Shifting Reality Through Science and Spirituality (2017)
- Keep Your Spirits Up: A Simple Guide to Lift Your Vibes Sky-high Without Struggle or Pain (2018)

=== Guidebooks ===
- Yoga for a Broken Heart: A Spiritual Guide to Healing from Break-up, Loss, Death or Divorce (2007)

The book teaches readers how to use yoga to cure the hurt caused by the loss of a partner through death, separation, or divorce. It seeks to offer positive therapy by focusing on the stages of emotion after the loss and articulating yoga techniques across the difficulty spectrum, and give comfort and a sense of community through personal stories. It has been published in English, German, and Italian.

== Upcoming projects ==
Paisley is in the editing stage for a forthcoming third novel, entitled All She's Got, adapting it for film as well as crafting an original screenplay.

She is a featured collaborator/speaker in the upcoming international film and television project "The Difference."
