= Northwest Seaport =

- Predecessor: Save Our Ships
- Formation: 1964
- Location(s): 860 Terry Ave N. Seattle, Washington
- Coordinates: 47°37′36″N 122°20′13″W
- Website: nwseaport.org

Northwest Seaport Maritime Heritage Center is a nonprofit organization in Seattle, Washington dedicated to the preservation and interpretation of Puget Sound and Northwest Coast maritime heritage, expressed through educational programs and experiences available to the public aboard its ships. The organization owns three large historic vessels docked at the Historic Ships' Wharf in Seattle's Lake Union Park; the tugboat Arthur Foss (1889), Lightship 83 Swiftsure (1904), and the halibut fishing schooner Tordenskjold (1911). These vessels are used as platforms for a variety of public programs, ranging from tours and festivals to restoration workshops and vocational training.

Northwest Seaport is adjacent to the Center for Wooden Boats and the Museum of History and Industry on the south shore of Lake Union in downtown Seattle. These organizations have partnered in many public programs and events at Lake Union Park but are not affiliated with each other. Northwest Seaport also is not affiliated in any way with the Northwest Seaport Alliance, the joint port authority for the cities of Seattle and Tacoma, newly formed in 2015.

== History of the organization ==
Northwest Seaport was founded in the early 1960s as the Save Our Ships project to save the 1897 Pacific schooner Wawona. Save Our Ships purchased Wawona in 1964, followed by Lightship 83 "Relief" in 1966 (subsequently changed to "Swiftsure" lightship station), and received the tugboat Arthur Foss as a donation from the Foss company in 1970.

Save Our Ships was based in Kirkland, on Lake Washington, throughout the 1970s, eventually changed its name to Northwest Seaport, and then relocated to its current site on Lake Union (on the edge of downtown Seattle) in the early 1980s.

Northwest Seaport has been a primarily volunteer organization throughout its half century of service. The decline of its flagship by the early 2000s, however, prompted the board of directors to focus on hiring professional staff to manage the ships and the organization.

== Programs ==
Northwest Seaport offers programs ranging from public tours, festivals, and story times for toddlers to vocational training in the marine trades and traditional maritime music sing-alongs.

== Historic fleet ==
The historic fleet at Lake Union Park's Historic Ships Wharf includes four vessels on the National Register of Historic Places: Two of these belong to Northwest Seaport. The other two belong to other non-profit organizations. Northwest Seaport's third vessel on the wharf is in the process of being nominated for NHL status.

=== Tugboat Arthur Foss ===
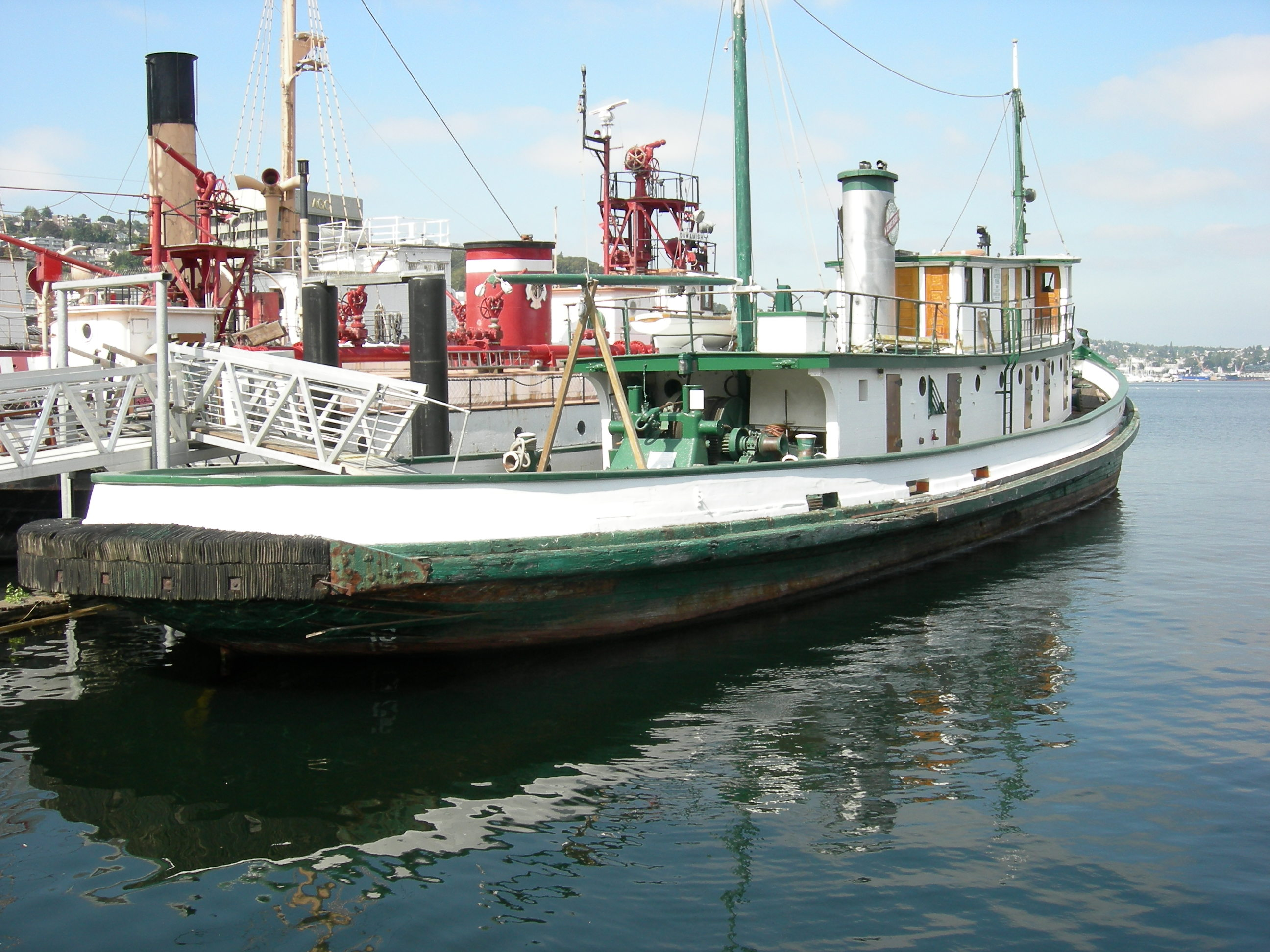
Arthur Foss

The tugboat Arthur Foss, built in 1889, is the oldest wooden-hulled tugboat afloat in the United States. In 1898, in response to the Klondike Gold Rush, she transported barges full of gold-seeking miners and supplies up the Inside Passage to Alaska. There are no other Alaska gold rush vessels still operating today. She was cast by the Metro-Goldwyn-Mayer movie studio to play in its 1933 production Tugboat Annie. In World War II, Arthur Foss journeyed south to join the war effort. Before the Battle of Wake Island began in December 1941, she was the last vessel to escape. After the war she was used in the timber industry until retirement in 1968.

The Arthur Foss has a six-cylinder, 700 horsepower (520 kW) diesel engine. Her top speed is 13 knots (24 km/h). The vessel is 120 feet (37 m) long with a beam of 24.5 feet (7.5 m) and a draft of 16 feet (4.9 m). When last operated the vessel was owned by Foss Launch and Tug (now Foss Maritime) who donated her to Northwest Seaport in 1970. The vessel was declared a National Historic Landmark in 1989 and is a city landmark as well.

=== Lightship 83 "Swiftsure" (previously known as Relief) ===
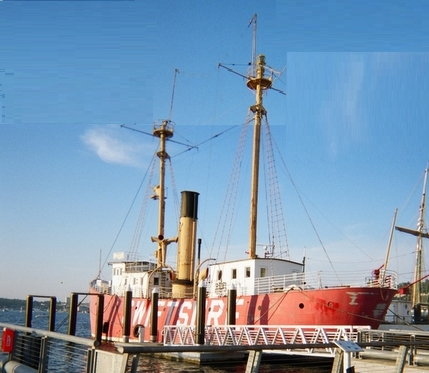
Lightship No. 83, aka Swiftsure, built in 1904, is one of Northwest Seaport's historic fleet.

Lightship #83, known to most by its station name, Swiftsure, is a lightvessel launched in Camden, New Jersey, in 1904. It served with the United States Lighthouse Service from 1904 to 1939 and then the United States Coast Guard from 1939 to 1960. The ship is now a museum vessel and is moored in Seattle, Washington.

In 1904–1905, LV-83 steamed around the tip of South America to her first station at Blunts Reef in California, where she saved 150 people when their ship ran aground in dense fog. In 1929, LV-83 was transferred to the San Francisco lightship station, changing the lettering on its side. It served as an armed patrol boat in WWII, then returned to lightship duty, and then in 1951 was transferred to Seattle and assigned the station name Relief, operating as the alternate, or relief vessel, for the newer primary lightships on the Columbia River bar, Umatilla Reef, and Swiftsure stations. Swiftsure refers to the Swiftsure Bank near the entrance to the Strait of Juan de Fuca separating Washington and Vancouver Island.

Swiftsure is one of the oldest lightships in the country and the only one to have her original steam engine. She is 129 feet long, with a beam of 28 feet, six inches and a draft of 12 feet, six inches. Her displacement is 668 tons. Her aids to navigation include a 1,000 watt primary light, a 140-decibel Diaphone foghorn, and a 1,000 pound foredeck fog bell.

The ship was decommissioned in 1960, and purchased by Northwest Seaport in 1966. She is listed on the National Register of Historic Places, was declared a National Historic Landmark in 1989, and is on the Washington State Heritage Register. She is moored on Lake Union, in Seattle, Washington, for restoration.

=== Halibut Schooner Tordenskjold ===
The 1911 halibut schooner, Tordenskjold, joined the Northwest Seaport fleet in February 2017. It was built in Seattle's Ballard neighborhood by renown boatbuilder, John Strand, in 1911. Tordenskjold fished the North Pacific and Bering Sea for over 100 years, never missing a season. From 1911 to 1934 its crew of 14 used dories to longline for halibut and cod. Then, after dories were outlawed, longlines were deployed off the boat itself. In 1939 its second captain, Carl Serwold, rerigged the boat as a trawler. Sometimes fishing for himself and sometimes fishing under charter to the International Pacific Halibut Commission, Washington Fish and Game, or other entities, Tordenskjold caught shrimp, king crab, and shark. In 1979 the boat was purchased by Marvin Gjerde and Per Odegaard (owner & captain of the F/V Vansee). They re-rigged Tordenskjold as a longliner again and for the next three-and-a-half decades, Marvin Gjerde fished halibut and black cod again. Tordenskjold retired from active fishing at the end of the 2012 summer season. Gjerde and Odegaard donated Tordenskjold to Northwest Seaport in 2017. The boat is kept in operational condition and visits regional boat shows as Northwest Seaport's mobile ambassador.

=== Fishing troller Twilight ===
Twilight is a 36-foot (11 m) fishing vessel. Launched from Seattle's Fishermen's Terminal in 1933, she trolled in the Pacific until the 1980s, and came to Northwest Seaport in 2000. Twilight is currently stored on shore while funds are raised for its restoration.

=== Schooner Wawona ===
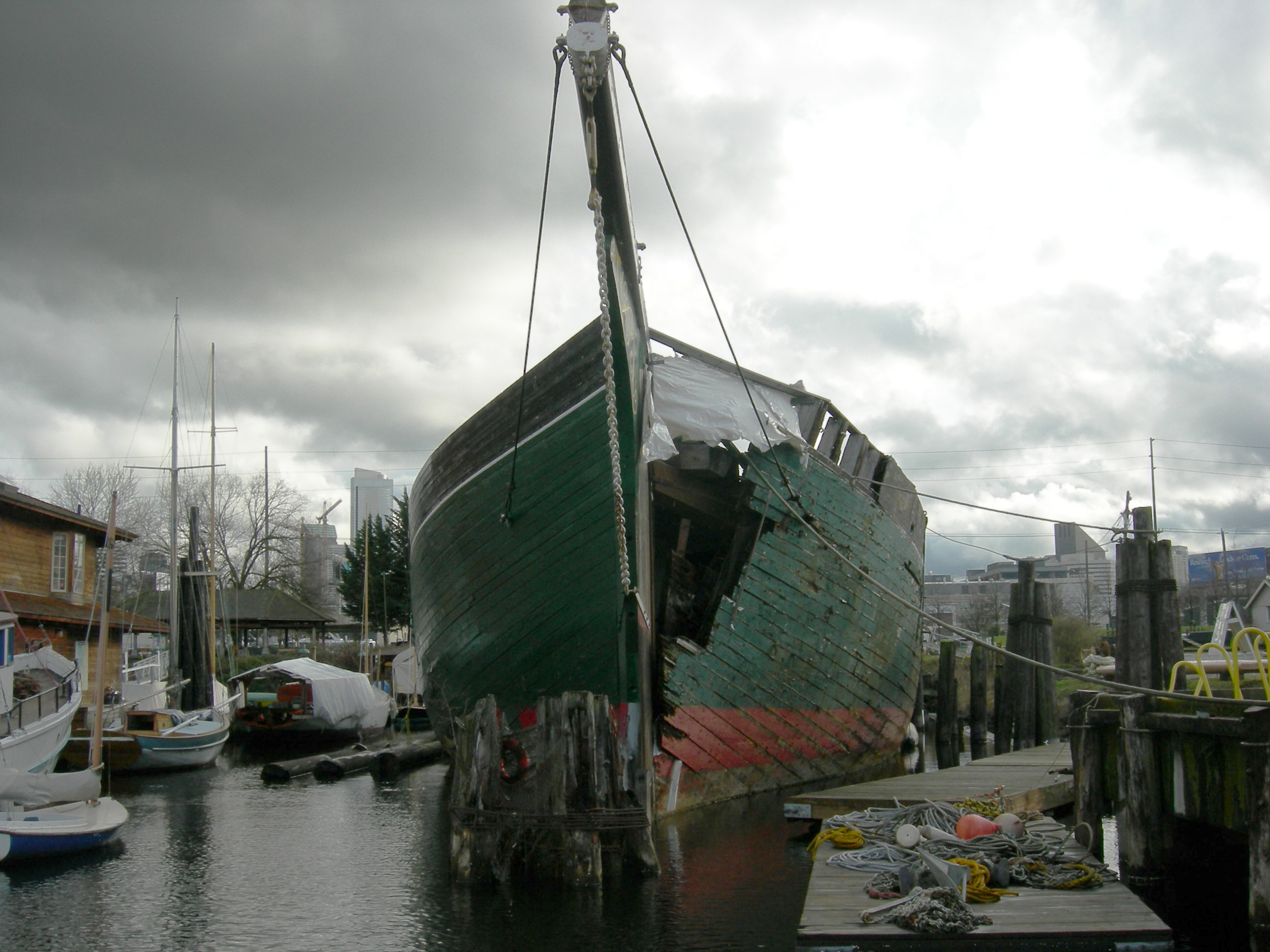
Wawona

The three-masted, fore-and-aft schooner Wawona sailed from 1897 to 1947 as a lumber carrier and later as a fishing vessel based in Puget Sound. The schooner was built in Fairhaven, on California's Humboldt Bay, by H.D. Bendixsen, one of the most important West Coast shipbuilders of the late 19th century. From 1897 to 1913, she carried lumber from Grays Harbor and Puget Sound ports to California. One of her captains, Ralph E. "Matt" Peasley, inspired a series of popular novels.

Wawona was 165 feet (50 m) long on deck with a 35-foot (11 m) beam. Her masts, stood 110 feet (34 m) from the keel.

She was berthed at South Lake Union Park in Seattle adjacent to the Center for Wooden Boats. She was listed on the National Register of Historic Places, the Washington State Heritage Register, and the vessel was an official city landmark. However, after efforts to restore the decaying ship failed, she was dismantled in March 2009. After conferring with many experts in the maritime heritage field, locally and across the nation, Northwest Seaport created a plan to preserve key artifacts from the vessel. Graduate students from East Carolina University's program in nautical archaeology documented the Wawona during the Wooden Boat Festival on 4–6 July 2008. In March 2009, the vessel was carefully deconstructed in a local shipyard and artifacts (including wooden knees, beams, and paneling) removed for storage and later display in on-land exhibits and memorials. Some parts of the Wawona were donated to be used on the C.A. Thayer in San Francisco.
