= Wawona (schooner) =

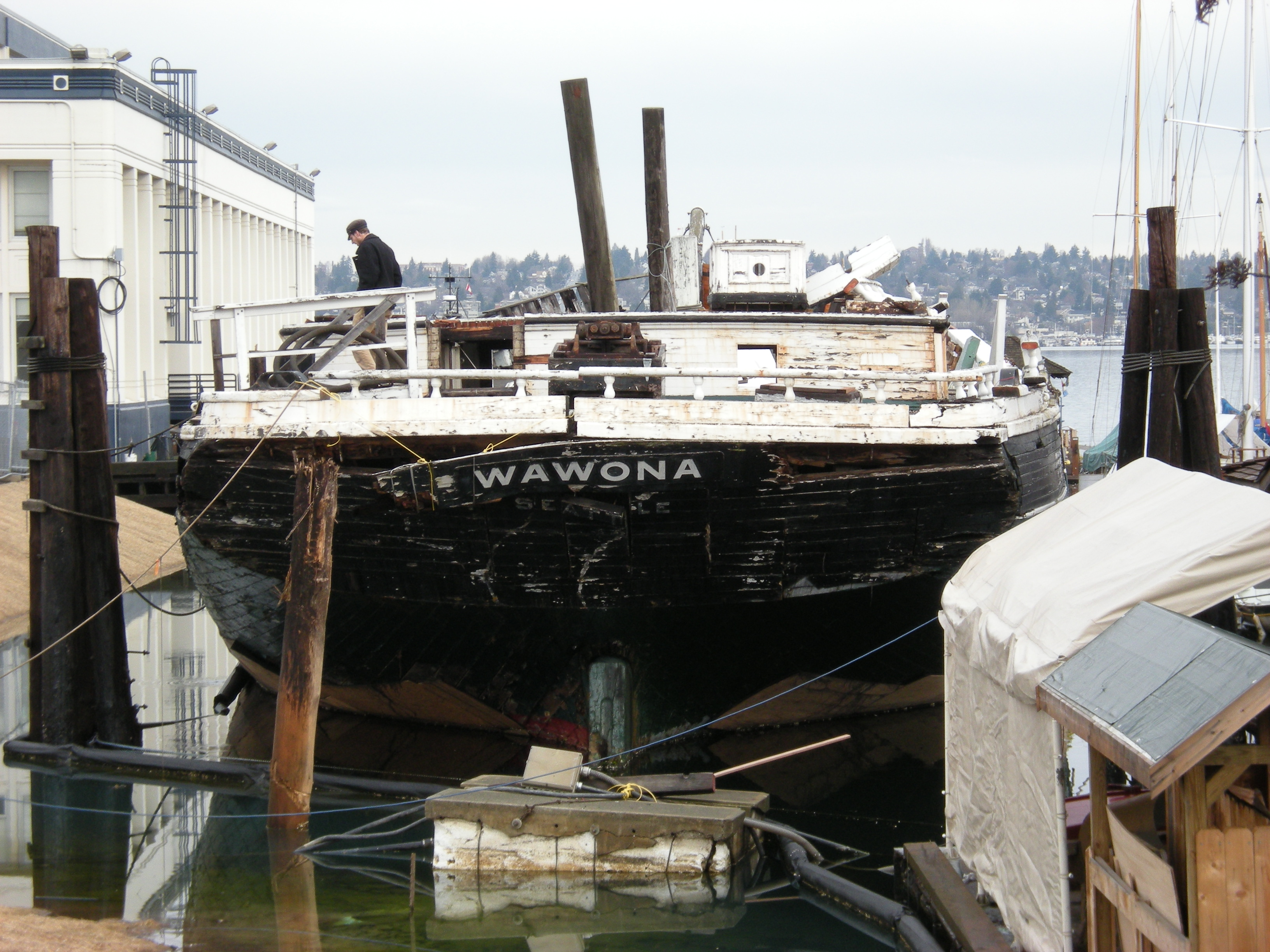
- Wawona, 2009

History

United States
- Builder: Hans Ditlev Bendixsen, near Eureka, California
- Out of service: 1948
- Fate: Dismantled, 2009

General characteristics
- Class & type: Fore-and-aft schooner
- Length: 165 feet (50 m)
- Beam: 35 feet (11 m)
- Draft: 12 feet (3.7 m)
- Wawona (schooner)
- U.S. National Register of Historic Places
- Seattle Landmark
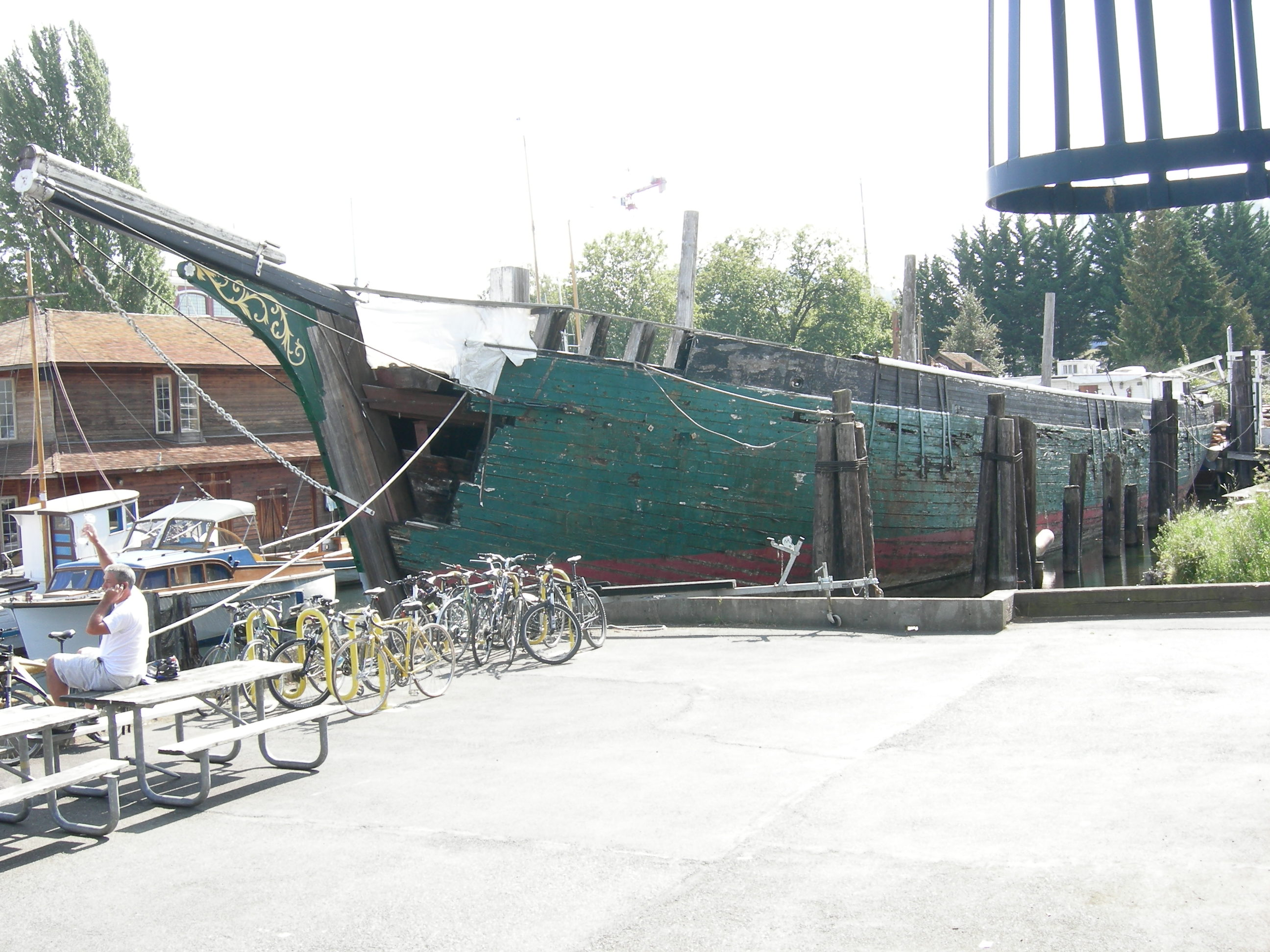
- Wawona, 2007
- Location: Seattle, Washington
- Coordinates: 47°37′37″N 122°20′10″W
- Built: 1897
- Architect: Hans Bendixsen
- NRHP reference No.: 70000643

Significant dates
- Added to NRHP: 1 July 1970
- Designated SEATL: 14 March 1977

Wawona was an American three-masted, fore-and-aft schooner that sailed from 1897 to 1947 as a lumber carrier and fishing vessel based in Puget Sound. She was one of the last survivors of the sailing schooners in the West Coast lumber trade to San Francisco from Washington, Oregon, and Northern California.

She was an iconic ship representing the Pacific Northwest's maritime history. After a 50-year career at sea, she was laid up for 16 years until efforts to preserve her began in 1963. Purchased in 1964 by Northwest Seaport, she became a museum ship for 45 years at Seattle's Museum of History & Industry (MOHAI), being berthed at their pier at Lake Union Park with continuous restoration efforts until rot and beetle infestations put her beyond repair. Dismantled in 2009, some of her wood and steel was reformed into a sculpture at the MOHAI in 2012 and will be preserved there for the future.

== History ==
Wawona was built near Eureka, California on Humboldt Bay by Hans Ditlev Bendixsen, who was one of the most important West Coast shipbuilders of the late 19th century. The vessel, built of Douglas Fir, was 165 feet (50 m) long with a 35-foot (11 m) beam, and her masts were 110 feet (34 m) tall. The captain's cabin was built especially strong in case lumber broke away on the deck.

=== Lumber ===
From 1897 to 1913, the schooner carried lumber from Grays Harbor and Puget Sound ports to California. One of her captains, Ralph E. "Matt" Peasley, inspired a series of popular novels.

=== Fishing ===
In 1914 Wawona was refitted as a fishing vessel, after which from 1914 until 1947, except for use as a military barge during World War II, she sailed to the Bering Sea with a crew of 36 to fish for cod. In 1935, her captain, Charles Foss, died at the wheel during a storm in the Aleutian Islands. Her service ended in 1948.

=== Museum Ship ===
In 1964, sixteen years after the vessel's retirement, a group of Seattle residents, headed by Kay Bullitt, formed Northwest Seaport and purchased Wawona to be a museum ship berthed at the Museum of History & Industry's pier at South Lake Union Park. The pier features several other historically important ships and is adjacent to the Center for Wooden Boats which provides educational experiences in maritime history. The schooner was made available for public visits during her ongoing restoration.

Wawona was listed on the National Register of Historic Places in 1970. She was also on the Washington State Heritage Register, and was an official city landmark. Her designs are maintained in the Library of Congress.

=== Dismantling ===
Since 1964, despite thousands of volunteer hours, numerous fundraising efforts and plenty of enthusiasm from a small core of the Wawona’s fans, there was never enough money available to completely repair the vessel. By 2005, because of water intrusion that was followed by beetle infestation, a full restoration was estimated at $15 million, and so a decision was made to demolish her after saving portions such as the captain's cabin.

Wawona was towed to the Lake Union Drydock on 4 March 2009 and then dismantled some days later. Some of the vessel's features were preserved for the museum.

With the vessel's demise, the only remaining West Coast lumber transport sailing ship is C.A. Thayer, moored in San Francisco.

== Museum sculpture ==
Following her demolition, MOHAI commissioned artist John Grade to use the salvaged materials from the ship to create an art piece. Grade created a massive 65-foot sculpture called Wawona that stands in the center of the Grand Atrium of the MOHAI. The sculpture extends below the floor and above the roof of the Museum. Wood from the ship was also used to create the museum's front desk and the bar at the museum's Compass Cafe.

== See also ==
- Northwest Seaport
- United States lightship Swiftsure (LV-83)
- Arthur Foss
- Historic preservation
- National Register of Historic Places
- List of schooners
