= Ralph Erksine Peasley =

American sea captain (1866–1948)

Captain Ralph Erksine Peasley "Captain Matt" (May 30, 1866 – December 13, 1948) was a sea captain from the Pacific Northwest who became famous due to a popular series of short stories by Peter Bernard Kyne called Cappy Ricks or the Subjugation of Matt Peasley.

== Family life ==
Peasley was born to Henry Clay Peasley a civil war veteran and Elizabeth Rose of Jonesport, Maine in 1866. He left home at age 14 to learn seamanship. At age 22, he captained his first ship. He came to Seattle, Washington about 1888.

In 1903, he married Emily Burrows "Burrie" Dalton, daughter of Captain James Dalton.

Peasley died in 1948.

== Career highlights ==
- While captain of the Louis he brought it into the Yangtze River after a typhoon, even though he had never been there. He brought it safely to port and set a passage record.
- In 1903, Peasley and Captain Smith saved a sailor from drowning.

== Ships ==
Louis (schooner)
Wawona (schooner)
Mary E Foster
Melancton
Kennewick (steamer)
Omega
Fred G Wood (schooner)
Vigilant 1919-1930 (schooner)
Linda 1931 (auxiliary sloop)

== Sources ==
- Naval Militia Takes Cruise. Aberdeen herald. (Aberdeen, Chehalis County, W.T.), 16 Sept. 1913. Chronicling America: Historic American Newspapers. Lib. of Congress.
- Tales of The Town Tersely Told. Aberdeen herald. (Aberdeen, Chehalis County, W.T.), 27 Apr 1917. Chronicling America: Historic American Newspapers. Lib. of Congress.
- "United States Census, 1870", database with images, FamilySearch (https://familysearch.org/ark:/61903/1:1:M6DW-7LF : 16 July 2019), Ralph E Peasley in the entry for Henry Peasley, 1870.
- "United States Census, 1880," database with images, FamilySearch (https://familysearch.org/ark:/61903/1:1:MFQ4-Q8F : 15 August 2017), Ralph Peasely in the household of Henry C Peasely, Jonesport, Washington, Maine, United States; citing enumeration district ED 188, sheet 373A, NARA microfilm publication T9 (Washington, D.C.: National Archives and Records Administration, n.d.), FHL microfilm 1,254,490.
- "United States Census, 1900," database with images, FamilySearch (https://familysearch.org/ark:/61903/1:1:MMGQ-JYS : accessed 25 February 2020), Ralph E Peasley in the household of Henry Peasley, Jonesport town, Washington, Maine, United States; citing enumeration district (ED) 209, sheet 8B, family 180, NARA microfilm publication T623 (Washington, D.C.: National Archives and Records Administration, 1972.); FHL microfilm 1,240,601.
- "United States Census, 1910," database with images, FamilySearch (https://familysearch.org/ark:/61903/1:1:MGV8-7YK : accessed 25 February 2020), Head Ralph E Peasley, Aberdeen Ward 5, Chehalis, Washington, United States; citing enumeration district (ED) ED 6, sheet 9B, family 161, NARA microfilm publication T624 (Washington D.C.: National Archives and Records Administration, 1982), roll 1653; FHL microfilm 1,375,666.
- "United States Census, 1920," database with images, FamilySearch (https://familysearch.org/ark:/61903/1:1:MHFR-P2W : accessed 25 February 2020), Ralph Peasley, Aberdeen Ward 4, Grays Harbor, Washington, United States; citing ED 69, sheet 1B, line 77, family 23, NARA microfilm publication T625 (Washington D.C.: National Archives and Records Administration, 1992), roll 1923; FHL microfilm 1,821,923.
- "United States Census, 1930," database with images, FamilySearch (https://familysearch.org/ark:/61903/1:1:XCSY-746 : accessed 25 February 2020), Ralph E Peasley, Aberdeen, Grays Harbor, Washington, United States; citing enumeration district (ED) ED 7, sheet 5A, line 8, family 113, NARA microfilm publication T626 (Washington D.C.: National Archives and Records Administration, 2002), roll 2488; FHL microfilm 2,342,222.
- "United States Census, 1940," database with images, FamilySearch (https://familysearch.org/ark:/61903/1:1:K99K-CZG : 27 July 2019), Ralph E Peasley, Ward 4, Aberdeen, Aberdeen Election Precinct 2, Grays Harbor, Washington, United States; citing enumeration district (ED) 14–14, sheet 4B, line 70, family 113, Sixteenth Census of the United States, 1940, NARA digital publication T627. Records of the Bureau of the Census, 1790 - 2007, RG 29. Washington, D.C.: National Archives and Records Administration, 2012, roll 4340.
