= Arthur Foss =

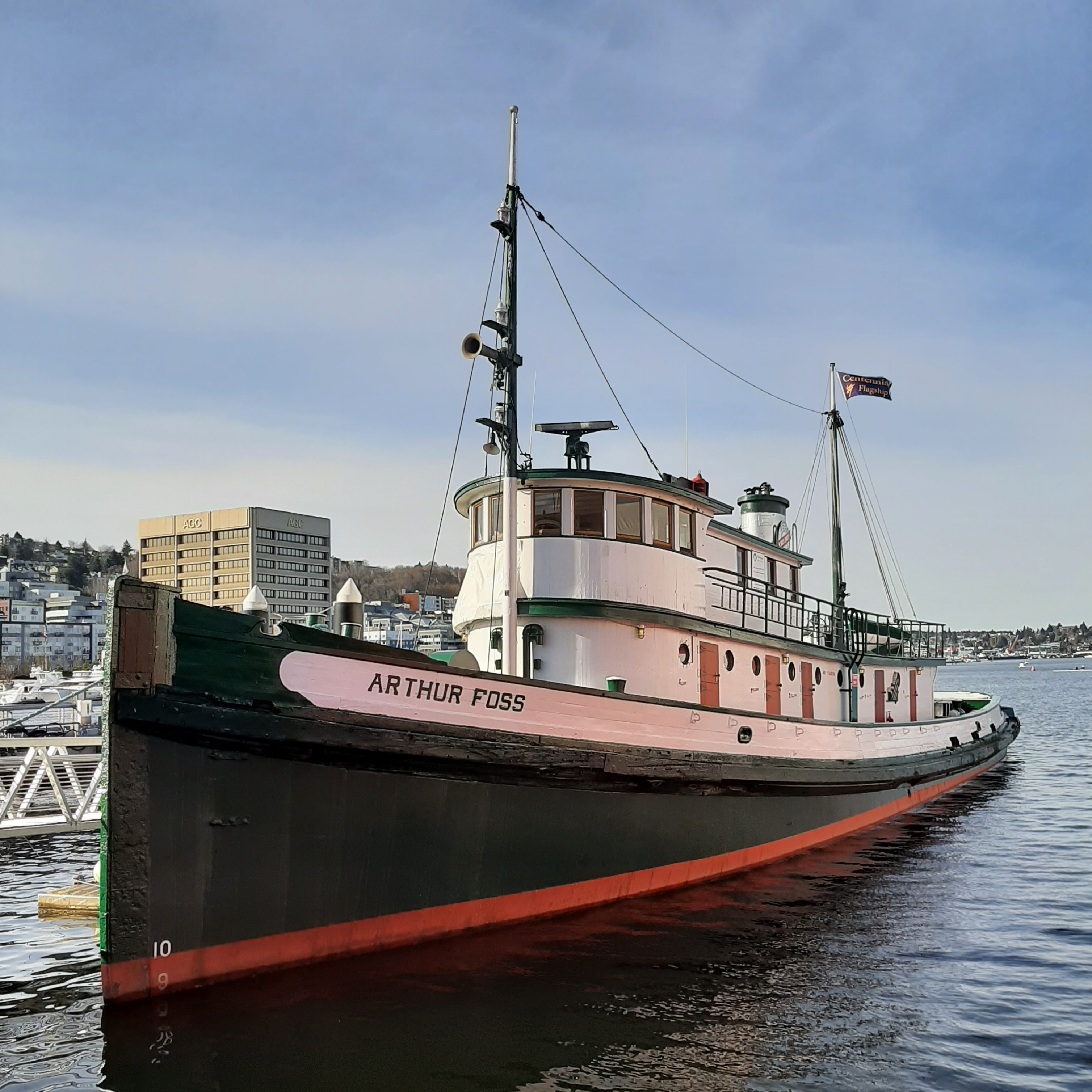
- Arthur Foss in her slip at the Historic Ships Wharf at Lake Union Park, March 2021.

History

United States
- Name: Wallowa (1889–1934); Arthur Foss (1934–1942); Dohasan (1942–1945 Navy); Arthur Foss (1945–1964); Theodore Foss (1964–1970); Arthur Foss (1970–present)
- Owner: Oregon Railway and Navigation Company (1889–1898); Pacific Clipper Line (1898–1904); Puget Sound Mill and Timber Company (1904–1929); Merrill & Ring Logging Company (1929); Foss Launch & Tug Company (1929–1970); Northwest Seaport (1970–present)
- Builder: Willamette Iron and Steel Works
- Launched: Summer 1889
- In service: Fall 1889
- Out of service: Summer 1968
- Identification: YT-335 (1942–1944); YTM-335 (1944–1945 Navy); WB6192 (1980–present)
- Status: Museum Ship
- Notes: Believed to be world's oldest wooden tug afloat

General characteristics
- Type: Tugboat
- Tonnage: 118 NT; 214 GT
- Displacement: 583 tons (unloaded)
- Length: 120 ft (37 m)
- Beam: 24.5 ft (7.5 m)
- Height: 45 ft (14 m)
- Draft: 16.0 ft (4.9 m)
- Decks: 4
- Installed power: Washington Iron Works diesel, direct reversing 6 cylinder, 700 hp (520 kW), 18,382 lb⋅ft (24,923 N⋅m)
- Propulsion: Direct-drive to 6 ft (1.8 m) diameter 3-blade propeller
- Speed: 13 kn (24 km/h; 15 mph)
- Crew: 7 (inshore tows) to 9 (coastal and oceanic tows)
- Notes: Classic heavy wood construction with limited ice-breaking capacity

- Arthur Foss (tugboat)
- U.S. National Register of Historic Places
- U.S. National Historic Landmark
- Seattle Landmark
- Location: Historic Ships Wharf, 860 Terry Avenue N., Seattle
- Coordinates: 47°37′41″N 122°20′13″W
- Area: Lake Union Park, South Lake Union, Seattle
- Built: 1889, Portland, Oregon
- Architect: David Stephenson
- Architectural style: Sawn old-growth Douglas fir, plank on frame
- NRHP reference No.: 89001078

Significant dates
- Added to NRHP: 11 April 1989
- Designated NHL: 11 April 1989
- Designated SEATL: 14 March 1977

Arthur Foss, built in 1889 as Wallowa at Portland, Oregon, is likely the oldest wooden tugboat afloat in the world. Its 79-year commercial service life began with towing sailing ships over the Columbia River bar, and ended with hauling bundled log rafts on the Strait of Juan de Fuca in 1968. Northwest Seaport now preserves the tug as a museum ship in Seattle, Washington.

The tug's long service in the Pacific Northwest, including a role in the Klondike Gold Rush, was interrupted by preparations for war in early 1941. After delivering a drydock gate to Pearl Harbor the tug was chartered by Contractors Pacific Naval Air Bases, a consortium formed to build air fields on remote Pacific islands as the United States prepared for war. In June 1941 Arthur Foss was supporting construction on Wake Island and was there in November along with the smaller Justine Foss transporting construction materials from barges in the lagoon to the island. When the work was completed the tug was scheduled to return to Hawaii with two barges in tow.

The captain, concerned about the warnings of war, left the island without refueling. The smaller tug had to refuel and remained to do so. Arthur Foss was about twelve hours into the voyage to Honolulu when word of the attack on Pearl Harbor was received. The tug's crew repainted the tug with what paint was available and kept radio silence. The tug, overdue and thought lost, was spotted by Navy patrol planes and made Pearl Harbor on 28 December with fuel for less than a day's operation left. The crew of Justine Foss were captured when the island was taken by the Japanese with all but one eventually executed. The Navy put Arthur Foss in service as a yard tug under the name Dohasan from early 1942 until February 1945. The tug was laid up until 1947 when it was returned to Foss and transported to its home area where it was rehabilitated for company service in 1948. It served the company for 20 more years until retirement in July 1968.

== Construction and early operations ==
This photograph is believed to be the earliest surviving image of Wallowa, taken in the 1890s during its Columbia River service. The lightship in the background is probably on station at the Columbia River entrance.

Wallowa was built in 1889 in Portland, Oregon, for the Oregon Railway & Navigation Company (OR & N). The hull was designed by noted shipbuilder David Stephenson, and constructed by the shipyard/machinery firm of Willamette Iron and Steel Works. The twin inclined (or "bilge") steam engines for the new vessel came from an older tug, Donald, which was retired from service that year. As built, Wallowa was listed as 111.5 feet (34.0 m) long, with a beam of 23.75 feet (7.24 m) and a depth of hold of 11.5 feet (3.5 m). According to another report, Wallowa was roughly 120 feet (37 m) long; this is in fact the overall length. The hull was launched in summer 1889, and fitting out was completed by September. On the 3rd, Captain George A. Pease, one of the most experienced pilots on the Columbia River, took Wallowa downriver from Portland to Astoria, Oregon. Although it is unknown if all were present for the maiden voyage, A.F. Goodrich and John S. Kidd served as engineers on the tug in its early years, as did John Melville.

The first master of Wallowa in service was Captain R.E. Howes. Howes was born in 1846 on Cape Cod, Massachusetts, and had been captain of Wallowa's predecessor Donald. Donald had been used to tow sailing vessels across the dangerous bar at the mouth of the Columbia River, and Wallowa was placed into the same service, operating out of Astoria. The new tug was taken on its first inspection trip across the bar on 23 September 1889, starting out from Astoria at 0300 hours. Present on board were a number of OR & N officials, including the chief of maritime and riverine operations, Captain James W. Troup. Wallowa returned to Astoria that afternoon, having been found to be fully satisfactory for bar service. The tug went on to successfully perform its intended duties in this dangerous service for the next nine years.

== Klondike Gold Rush service ==
This early photograph of Wallowa towing is believed to have been taken somewhere in Alaska during the Klondike Gold Rush (1898–1900).

In 1898, caught up in the shipping boom caused by the Klondike Gold Rush, the OR & N leased Wallowa to the White Star Line to tow that company's large sidewheeler Yosemite north up the Inside Passage to St. Michael, Alaska. (That town was a major gateway to the gold fields via the Yukon River.) An early return voyage to Seattle from Skagway towing the bark Columbia nearly resulted in the loss of Wallowa on 1 November 1898. A strong gale drove the tug ashore near Mary Island, north of Portland Canal on the southeast Alaska coast. Wallowa was found to have suffered no damage and was successfully refloated on the next high tide, but three days later Columbia was stranded at the mouth of Portland Canal and became a total loss. Wallowa was able to safely endure the rest of the stormy voyage to Seattle.

Wallowa's strong construction continued to serve it in good stead. The tug made many subsequent voyages up the Inside Passage transporting supply barges and construction materials for the mining camps. By 1900, Wallowa was listed as working for the Pacific Clipper Line under Captain E. Caine, carrying mail and supplies between Juneau, Haines, Skagway, and Seattle. In 1903, the tug returned to Puget Sound and was sold into the timber industry a year later. There is only one other Alaskan gold rush vessel still in existence: the privately owned 1890 wooden tugboat Elmore.

== Puget Sound Mill & Timber Company service ==
During its PSM & T Co. service, Wallowa was rarely seen in southern Puget Sound ports. Even rarer was a transit of the Hiram N. Chittenden Locks in Ballard. This photo was taken in August 1923 as Wallowa headed back into salt water.

In 1904, Wallowa was purchased by lumber baron Mike Earles, owner of Puget Sound Mill & Timber Company (PSM & T Co.), based at Port Angeles. For the next 25 years, the tug towed log rafts from the Port Crescent "booming grounds" on the Olympic Peninsula to sawmills in Bellingham. At some point shortly after acquiring Wallowa, Earles had the tug refitted and re-powered with a new boiler and a new vertical double-expansion steam engine to replace the worn and obsolete inclined "bilge engines" originally fitted to the old Donald. Wallowa emerged from the refit with much more power and towing capability than before. It performed reliable work for the PSM & T Co. without any significant layups, except for a rebuild of the main deckhouse following a fire in 1927. During this period the vessel was mostly under the command of Captain Frank Harrington.

In early 1929, Earles sold Wallowa to a neighboring timber concern: Merrill & Ring Logging Company, formed in 1886 by two families established in the lumber business back in Michigan and Minnesota. T.D. Merrill and Clark Ring had formed their joint venture after arriving in the Pacific Northwest to scout timberlands, acquiring large tracts around the Pysht River. The company still owns these today. Wallowa undertook the same types of jobs for Merrill & Ring as it had for the PSM & T Co., but operating primarily between booming grounds at Pysht and Port Angeles. However, after less than a year, Merrill & Ring decided to sell the tug.

== Foss Launch & Tug Company service (pre-war) ==
Foss Launch & Tug Company (Foss) purchased Wallowa in late 1929, and the vessel became among the first of that company's large, seagoing acquisitions. To help pay off the large purchase, Foss donated a previously agreed-upon amount of towing services to Merrill & Ring, then in 1931 leased Wallowa to MGM Studios for filming the 1933 blockbuster hit Tugboat Annie. That film, the first major motion picture filmed in Washington state, became a huge success and made Wallowa (unofficially renamed "Narcissus" during filming) a movie star.

Annual tugboat races have long been held at Puget Sound ports, but became more popular after the success of Tugboat Annie. After its 1934 rebuild, Arthur Foss (second from right) was always the favorite and frequent winner, capable of up to 13 knots. This photograph was taken in 1940 on Commencement Bay.

Afterward, Wallowa was returned to Foss, which rebuilt and modernized the tug from its main deck up at company headquarters in Tacoma in 1934. The primary component of the rebuild was installation of a state-of-the-art, six cylinder, four-stroke, 700 horsepower (520 kW) Washington Iron Works direct-drive diesel engine, which made the tug the most powerful on the West Coast. At re-launch, Foss renamed the tug Arthur Foss in honor of the company president and eldest son of company founder Thea Foss. Following successful trials, Arthur Foss went into commercial service as the Foss company flagship. However, steering troubles were presumably encountered, for a pneumatic power-steering assist system was installed in 1937. This was likely needed because increased right-hand torque from the propeller due to the more powerful engine made manual steering difficult for a single person.

For nearly three years following modernization, Arthur Foss was utilized primarily for coastal tows to California, Oregon, and Alaska, based mostly out of Tacoma. The tug set several speed and tonnage hauled records, most notably while towing large lumber schooners down the coast to California. The most famous of these voyages occurred in 1936 under the command of Captain W. B. Sporman when, battling bad weather the whole time, Arthur Foss towed the large four-masted schooner Commodore, loaded with 1,500,000 board feet (3,500 m^{3}) of lumber, from Oregon to Los Angeles in a record seven days. During this period the tug also frequently towed log rafts, ships, and barges along the Inside Passage as it had during the gold rush. Disaster struck on 18 February 1937, when a severe fire broke out in the forward crew quarters. In order to save Arthur Foss, Captain J.M. Bowers deliberately steered the tug into shallow water near Discovery Bay and sank it, extinguishing the fire. Several other vessels came to assistance, and Arthur Foss was refloated and taken to Tacoma for repairs.

The large lumber schooner Commodore, in tow of the tugboat Arthur Foss, arrives at Los Angeles in record time, 1936.

By late 1937, Arthur Foss was back in service with a new power steering system and a new, extremely skillful captain. In November both tug and captain, Martin Guchee, were commended for towing the disabled motorship Eastern Prince from Yakutat, Alaska, to Seattle in just six days. Captain Guchee was also at the helm when Arthur Foss became in involved in the construction of two of the Northwest's most famous landmarks. In 1938, the tug made a long tow from San Francisco with the giant barge Foss No. 64, which had been used in the construction of the Golden Gate Bridge. Foss No. 64 was needed up north for the construction of the Tacoma Narrows Bridge which began in September 1938. The bridge was completed in 1940 and, after just a few months in service, collapsed in high winds due to aeroelastic flutter. Students of physics and structural engineering have been studying the infamous event ever since. In January 1939, construction of another famous bridge began on Lake Washington, the Lacey V. Murrow Memorial Bridge connecting Seattle to Mercer Island. Prior to construction, extensive testing of the pontoons' strength and stability occurred over a nine-month period in 1938. An experimental barge approximating the proposed bridge's configuration was anchored in the lake, and the most powerful tug on the West Coast was hired to put it to the test. Captain Guchee took Arthur Foss at full speed around and around the test barge, generating four-foot waves and simulating lake conditions in an 85 knots (157 km/h) wind. Engineers and technicians were on hand to take readings. The test barge held, but not satisfied with the amount of stress he was putting it under, Captain Guchee put Arthur Foss's bow against the barge and "gave her full power". The anchoring system still held. Utilizing the data gathered during this unorthodox experiment and others, the world's first floating highway bridge was completed in 1940. To this day, there are only five similar floating spans in the world, and three are located in Washington State.

After its involvement with the two soon-to-be-famous bridges, Arthur Foss returned to its normal towing duties up and down the coast. Captain Vince Miller was in command at this time. After a record barge tow of 1,800,000 board feet (4,200 m^{3}) of lumber to Los Angeles in late 1940, on 8 February 1941 the tug departed Tacoma for Oakland, California, to pick up a barge carrying a huge gate for one of the United States Navy's dry docks at Pearl Harbor. Arthur Foss and tow departed for Hawaii on 15 February 1941 and arrived without mishap two weeks later. The crew thought they were on just another routine job and would soon be returning home.

== World War II service ==
Arthur Foss successfully delivered the drydock gate to the navy yard at Pearl Harbor in early March 1941. Instead of returning to the West Coast, the vessel was chartered by Foss to a consortium of civilian engineering firms: Contractors Pacific Naval Air Bases (CPNAB), which had been formed in January 1941 to begin construction of military bases on strategic Pacific atolls, including Wake Island. Arthur Foss's first assignment with CPNAB was towing gravel barges from Kaneohe to Honolulu for construction of airport runways. This work lasted until June, when the tug was assigned to a regular run between Hawaii and Wake towing barges of construction materials and military supplies for the airfield and barracks there. Meanwhile, the United States quietly prepared for the coming of war. In November, amid increasing U.S.-Japanese tensions, the tug was again dispatched from Honolulu under the command of Captain Oscar Rolstad to Wake towing two fully loaded barges. Upon arrival, Arthur Foss was joined by the smaller Justine Foss in the atoll harbor. Offloading the barges and lightering the equipment ashore occupied the two tug crews for the next few weeks. Upon completion of the work, Arthur Foss was scheduled to return to Honolulu towing two 1,000-ton fuel barges (empty). Departure from Wake was expected in the first week of December.

Arthur Foss was the last vessel escape Wake Island on 8 December 1941 (7 December on the U.S. side of the International Date Line). This photograph was taken on 5 December.

Work was completed on schedule. Arthur Foss needed to refuel before undertaking the 2,300 miles (3,700 km) voyage back to Hawaii. Captain Rolstad and the crew were extremely anxious to leave as soon as possible. By the early morning of 8 December 1941 (7 December on the other side of the International Date Line), three war warnings had been issued over the radio, and Captain Rolstad decided to forego refueling. He took Arthur Foss and tow to sea. Twelve hours out of Wake, news of the attack on Pearl Harbor was received. Japanese naval air forces simultaneously attacked Wake. Painted a highly visible white and green, Arthur Foss was a ripe target standing "out like a chain of coral islands on the empty sea", and Captain Rolstad was acutely aware of the likelihood of being bombed or torpedoed. While underway, the crew hastily mixed all white paint on board with engine grease to repaint the tug dark gray to help blend in with the ocean. All lights were blacked out and Arthur Foss proceeded under radio silence. Still towing the two barges at barely more than walking speed, the crew debated whether they should head for Alaska or Hawaii. No one was certain if they had enough fuel to reach either place, or whether when/if they arrived they would find the enemy in control. The decision was made to follow original orders and head to Honolulu at reduced speed to conserve as much fuel as possible.

This is the only image so far discovered of Arthur Foss in wartime configuration as YT/YTM-335 Dohasan. The gray wheelhouse, foremast with bell, forward crucifix bitt, and bow with large "335" in white are visible behind the other tugboats in the foreground. The photograph was taken in 1947 after the tug was returned to Foss at Tacoma.

Arthur Foss and tow were spotted by U.S. naval scout planes and escorted into Pearl Harbor on 28 December 1941, where Admiral Claude Bloch cited the crew for action beyond the call of duty. Due to the reduced speed of the voyage, they were a week overdue and had been presumed missing in action. According to Captain Rolstad's log, less than 500 U.S. gallons of fuel remained when they docked (this was the equivalent of running on fumes, as the main engine uses about 42 U.S. gallons per hour).

Arthur Foss was ultimately the last vessel to escape Wake before Japanese forces captured the island on 23 December 1941, after a prolonged and bloody siege. After Arthur Foss's departure, only a few flights of Pan Am flying boats carrying employees and some civilian contractors were able to escape. The crew of Justine Foss, which unlike Arthur Foss had remained to refuel, was captured and used as forced labor. Justine Foss itself was scuttled by the Japanese. All members of the crew except Thea Foss's grandson Drew (who had been removed to a prisoner of war camp in Burma) were executed along with all the remaining captives in 1943.

Arthur Foss was placed in service by the United States Navy in early 1942, renamed Dohasan and designated YT-335 (harbor tug) and later YTM-335 (district harbor tug, medium). The tug continued to tow supply barges between bases in the Hawaiian archipelago and even ventured as far as French Frigate Shoals, 500 miles (800 km) northwest of Oahu. Dohasan towed a large grab dredge to the Shoals on 8 August 1942 for construction of an emergency landing strip there, then remained as a tender to the dredge as it removed material from the lagoon and deposited it ashore to build up and form a runway. The tug returned to Hawaii after three months of this work, but afterward apparently spent a lot of time idle as navy crews were unfamiliar with operation of the main engine. After the war ended in September 1945, Dohasan continued in naval service until being stricken from the Navy List on 7 February 1945 and lay up at Honolulu through 1946. The tug was finally returned to Foss Launch & Tug Company ownership in fall 1947, and renamed Arthur Foss. To return the worn-out tug to the West Coast, CPNAB secured it in a floating drydock and had it towed to Los Angeles. During the stormy voyage, rough seas knocked Arthur Foss off its keel blocks, heavily damaging the hull. Upon arrival back in Tacoma, Foss began a comprehensive rehabilitation of the tug which occupied it until August 1948.

== Foss Launch & Tug Company service (post-war) ==
Between 1948 and 1968, Arthur Foss was kept hard at work towing bundled log rafts on the Strait of Juan de Fuca.

Upon completion of repairs, the newly refurbished Arthur Foss was assigned to Foss's Port Angeles division with the task of towing log cribs and later bundled log rafts in the Strait of Juan de Fuca, mostly under contract to Crown Zellerbach, Rayonier, and Weyerhaeuser. Each raft averaged about 750,000 board feet (1,800 m^{3}) of timber. Arthur Foss operated between Neah Bay, Sekiu, Clallam Bay, Pysht, Port Crescent, and Port Angeles; and continued this work for 20 years, setting the record for the longest uninterrupted towing service in the Straits. During this period the tug was almost exclusively under the command of captains Lynn Davis and Arnold Tweter. In 1964 during annual overhaul the tug was renamed Theodore Foss in honor of Thea Foss's eldest brother-in-law; a brand-new oceangoing tug took on the venerable name Arthur Foss that year. Upon retirement in July 1968, Theodore Foss was moved to Tacoma and sat idle for the next two years. In 1970, the vessel was donated to Northwest Seaport by Foss Launch & Tug Company and renamed Arthur Foss once again (since no longer part of the commercial fleet). Henry Foss himself, youngest and last surviving son of Thea Foss, presided at the official transfer ceremony.

== Museum ship and National Historic Landmark ==
Northwest Seaport volunteers cleaned and organized the tug's interior and refurbished the main engine piece by piece, with the first official startup as a museum ship occurring in 1980. Afterward Arthur Foss regularly cruised Puget Sound waters during the summer months with a volunteer crew, participating in tugboat races, boat shows, and other maritime heritage events until 2001. The tug's excursions ended that year due to rising fuel and insurance costs, and increased safety concerns, in the wake of the 11 September attacks. Volunteer crew burnout, lack of organizational development, and the increasing need for major restoration work also played a part. Varying non-professional attempts at spot repairs over the years were superseded beginning in 2004 with larger but specifically focused restoration projects run by contracted professionals. However, a comprehensive restoration has not yet been attempted. Following extensive survey, documentation, and hull maintenance projects in 2017, planning and fundraising efforts are under way to restore the vessel to its 1940 appearance, in cruising condition.

Arthur Foss was declared a National Historic Landmark in 1989, is on the National Register of Historic Places, and is a Seattle Landmark. The tug was also named a Washington State Centennial Heritage Flagship in 1989, when both tug and state celebrated their 100th "birthday".

Arthur Foss is currently docked at the Historic Ships Wharf at Seattle's Lake Union Park, and is a featured attraction open for public tours most summer weekends, or by appointment.

== See also ==
- United States lightship Swiftsure (LV-83)
- Wawona (schooner)
- Northwest Seaport
