= SCW =

SCW may refer to:

- Seabee combat warfare specialist insignia, an enlisted warfare qualification of the U.S. Navy
- Seattle Coffee Works, a coffee company based in Seattle, Washington
- Security Configuration Wizard, a component of Windows Server 2003 SP1
- SkyWest Charter (ICAO airline code), an American airline and subsidiary of SkyWest, Inc.
- South Cotabato Warriors, a Filipino professional basketball team
- Spanish Civil War, a conflict in Spain (1936–1939)
- Supercritical water, a special phase of water
- Supreme Council for Women, an advisory body in Bahrain
- Syktyvkar Airport (IATA airport code SCW), an airport in Syktyvkar, Komi Republic, Russia
- Syrian civil war (sometimes written as Syrian Civil War), a civil war started in 2012
