= Troy Laundry Building (Seattle) =

1927 building in the South Lake Union/Cascade District of Seattle

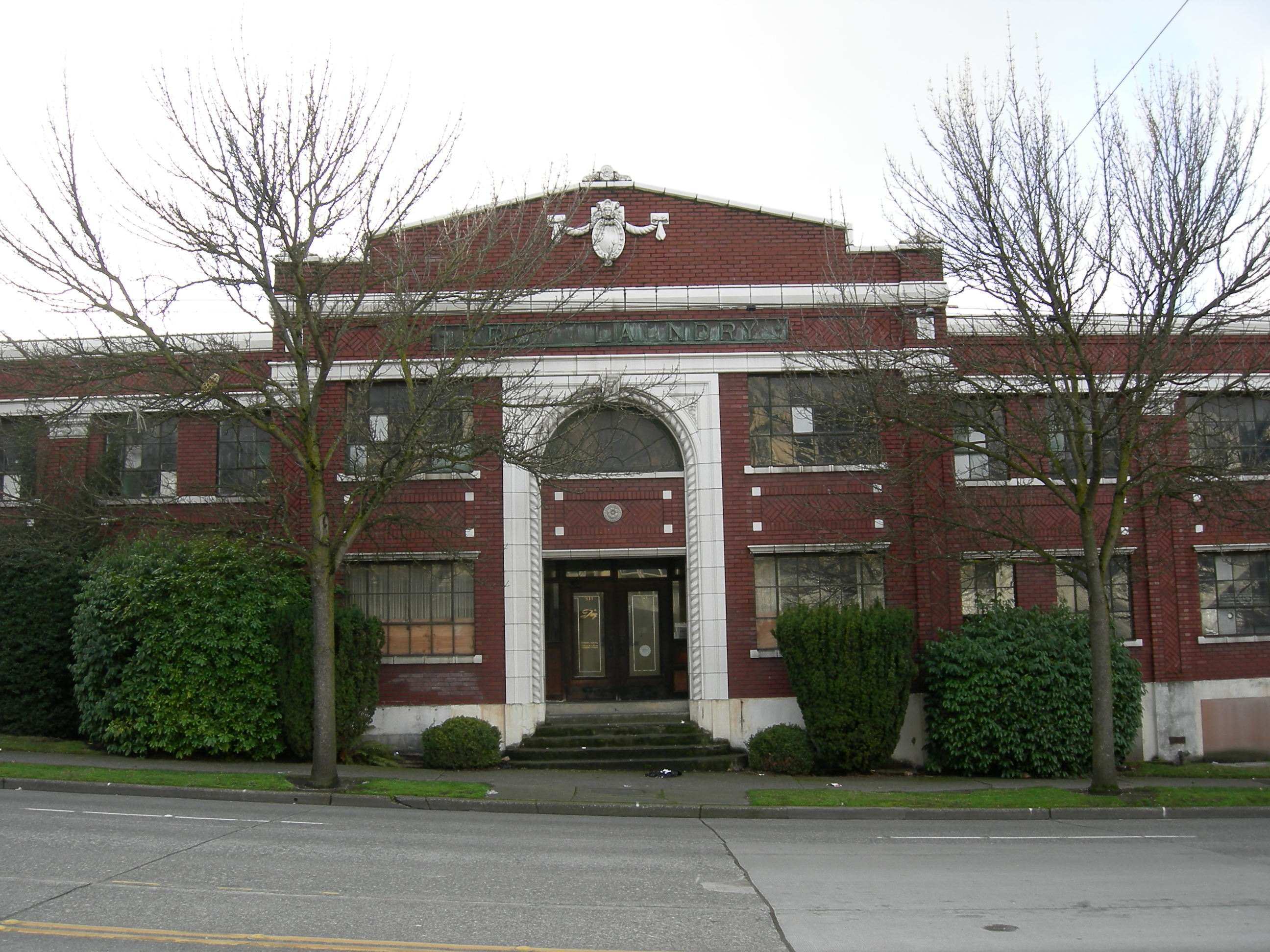

- Location within Washington (state)
- 47°37′16″N 122°20′4″W
- Location: Seattle, Washington

History
- Built: 1927
- Demolished: 2013

Site notes
- Architect: Victor W. Voorhees

Seattle Landmark
- Designated: March 11, 1996

The Troy Laundry Building is a 1927 building in the South Lake Union/Cascade District of Seattle. The building was originally built to house the Troy Laundry Company. It was designated as Seattle Landmark in March 1996.

== Renovation ==
The building was demolished in 2013, but its facade facing the intersection of Fairview Avenue and Thomas Street was preserved for incorporation into two new highrise office buildings, known as the Troy Block. The project cost an estimated $285 million and began construction in 2015. This two tower complex is designed by architecture firm Perkins + Will with Lease Crutcher Lewis as the general contractor. One tower is 13 stories high while the other is 12 stories. The Troy Block was completed in October 2017 with a total of 811,500 square feet (75,390 m^{2}) of office space and several retail spaces, including an Amazon Go that opened a year later and closed in 2026. The entire complex was sold to a Miami-based real estate investment firm in 2019 for $740 million.

Cascade Coffee Works operated here, rebranding to Victrola Coffee in 2024.

== See also ==
- List of Seattle landmarks
