= Naval Reserve Armory =

- U.S. National Register of Historic Places
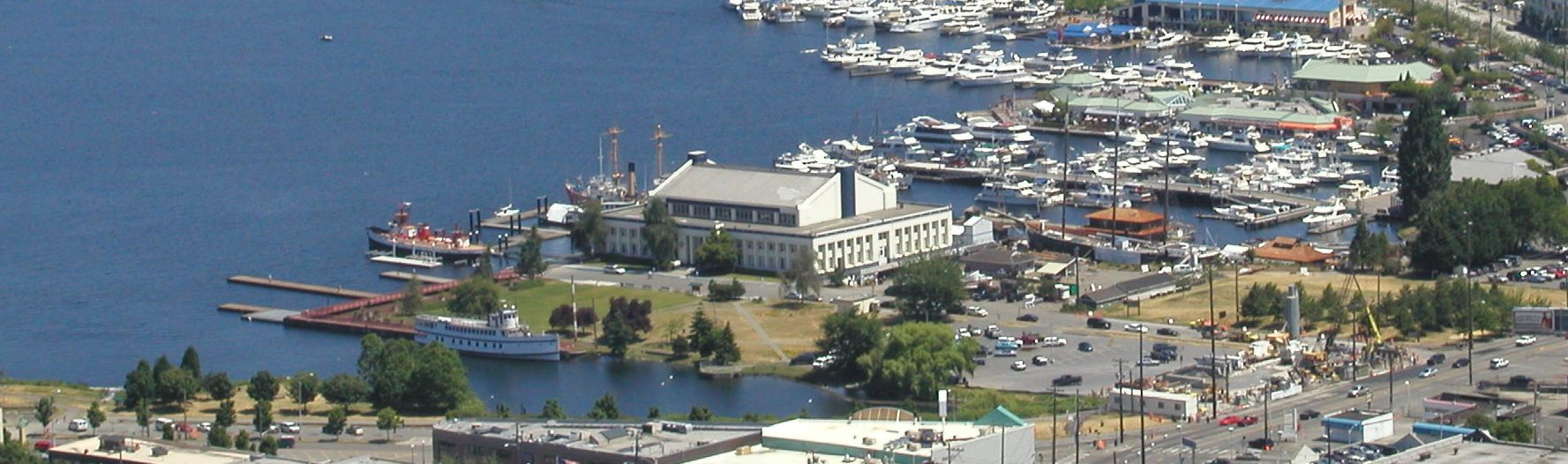
- Naval Reserve Armory and Lake Union Park as viewed from the Space Needle

- Location within Washington (state)
- Location: 860 Terry Avenue North, Seattle, Washington, U.S.
- Coordinates: 47°37′39.4″N 122°20′13.2″W
- Area: 1.42 acres (5,700 m^{2})
- Built: 1941–1942
- Architect: B. Marcus Priteca, William R. Grant
- Architectural style: Moderne, Art Deco
- NRHP reference No.: 09000506
- Added to NRHP: July 8, 2009

The Naval Reserve Armory is a landmark building in the South Lake Union neighborhood of Seattle, Washington, United States. Since 2012, it has been the home of the Museum of History and Industry (MOHAI), a local history museum.

The building is a large concrete structure influenced by the Moderne and Art Deco movements, that was built by the Works Progress Administration from 1941 to 1942. The main interior feature is a 133 x 100 ft (40.5 x 30 m) drill hall which was used by the U.S. Naval Reserve to train thousands of young recruits for service in World War II. The building is noted for its association with mass mobilization during the war as well as its involvement with Depression-era work relief.

The building was designed by Seattle architect William R. Grant and B. Marcus Priteca. Its construction was initially promoted by a citizens' committee but delayed by fears it would be a white elephant; eventually politicians endorsed and promoted the project, and it secured a $99,997 WPA grant. Later a $69,983 increase was granted, and the project was also funded by $6,399 from the State of Washington and $14,204 from, perhaps uncharacteristically, the University of Washington. It is situated at the south end of Lake Union, a lake which was connected to Puget Sound by the Lake Washington Ship Canal in 1917. Previously the site had been used by the Eastern Mill, a sawmill.

Construction of the building cost a total of $500,000. It was dedicated on July 4, 1942, a "grim summer" point during the war, at a ceremony attended by honored guest Mrs. Peter Barber, whose three sons had been killed in the Japanese attack on Pearl Harbor. The armory was decommissioned after the war, but received renovation funding in 1946. It was disestablished by the U.S. Navy in 1998 and transferred to the Seattle Department of Parks and Recreation in 2000.

The property was added to the National Register of Historic Places (NRHP) on July 8, 2009; the listing was announced as the featured listing in the National Park Service's weekly list of July 17, 2009. As of that year, the building remained in good condition. After being forced to move from their Montlake site, the renovation of the armory into a museum for MOHAI was proposed. The building was leased out by the city government to community groups and event organizers before a deal with MOHAI was reached with the city in 2009.

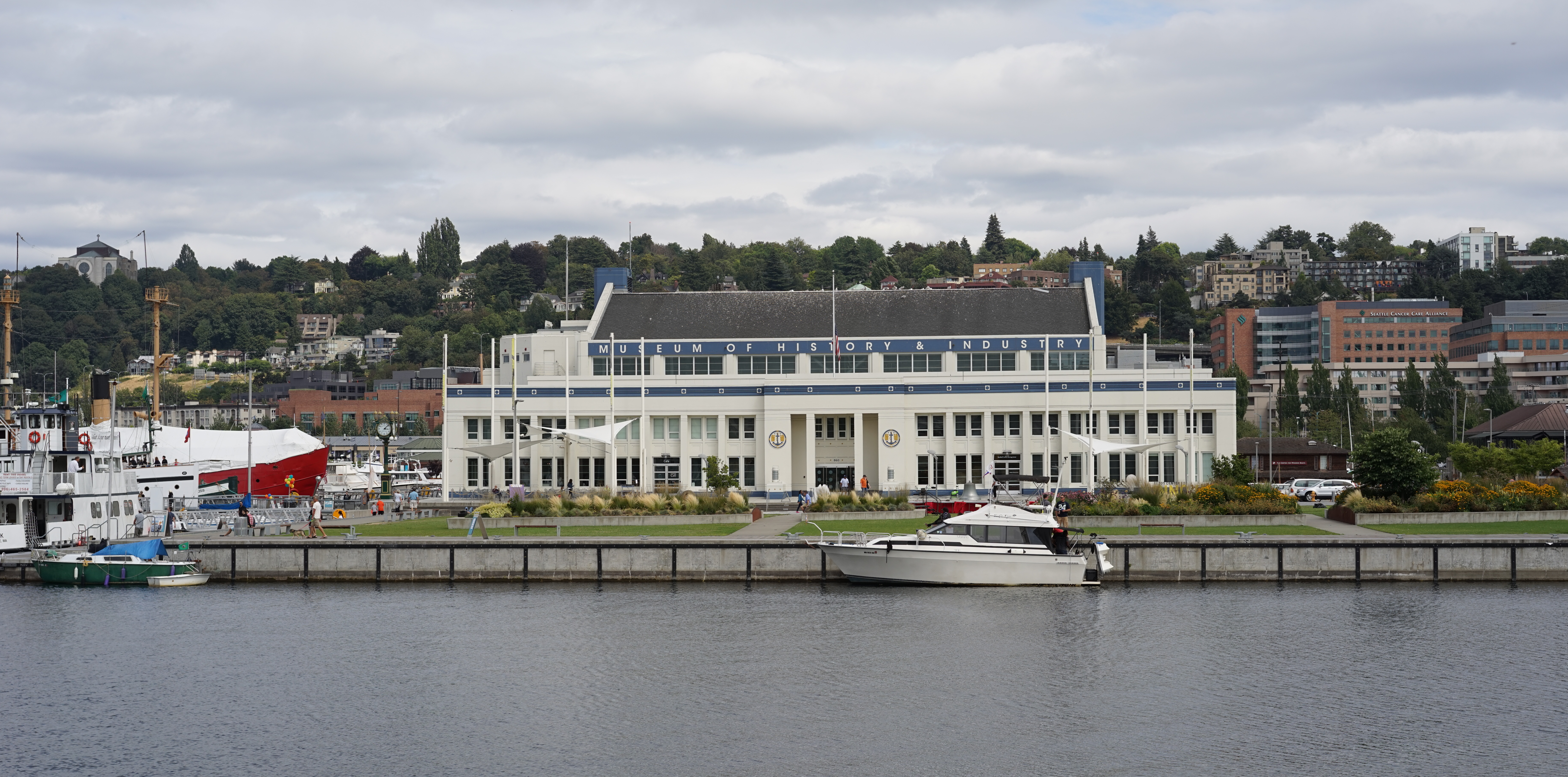
The Museum of History and Industry

The $90 million renovation of the armory for MOHAI was partially funded by the Washington State Department of Transportation, which had acquired the Montlake site for highway construction, and private donations. It reopened on December 29, 2012. LMN Architects led the project, which was awarded LEED Platinum status for its sustainable features that maximize daylight use and recycled materials during construction. Lake Union Park was developed alongside the renovation project and connects the lakefront area to the growing South lake Union neighborhood.
