= South Lake Union, Seattle =

Neighborhood of Seattle

South Lake Union, Seattle čaʔkʷšəd
- Seattle Neighborhood
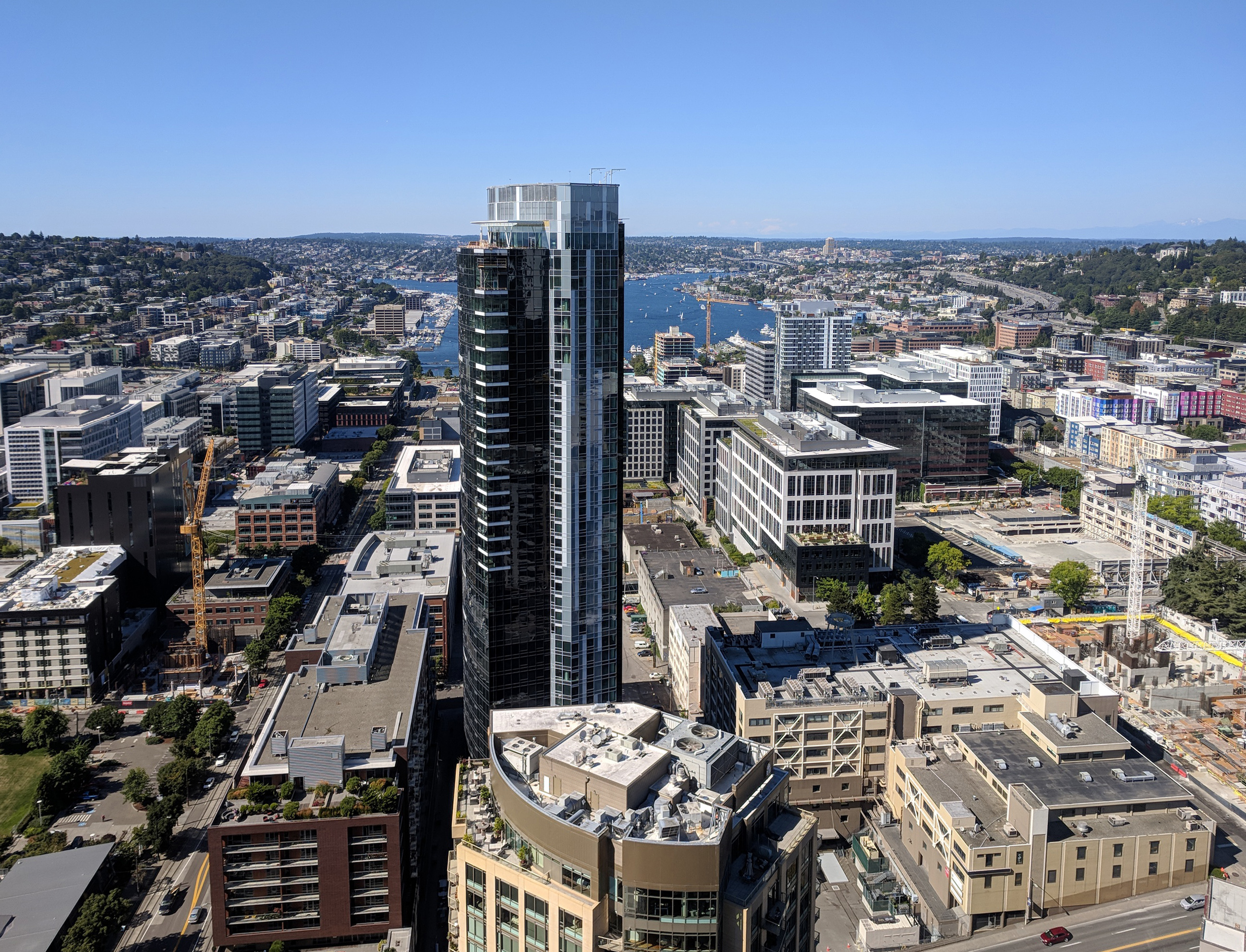
- South Lake Union neighborhood, viewed from south of Denny Way
- Nicknames: SLU
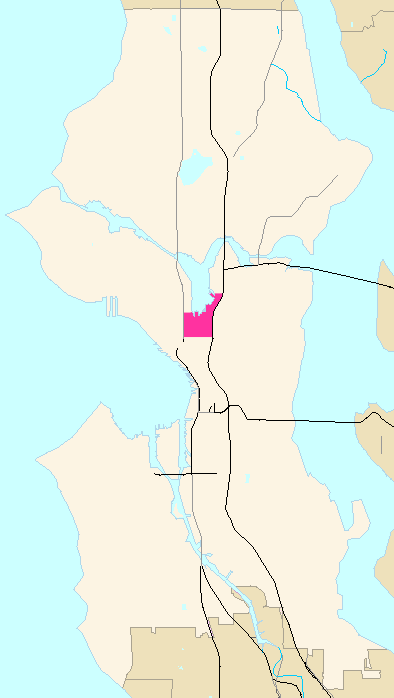
- South Lake Union Highlighted in Pink
- Coordinates: 47°37′28″N 122°19′54″W
- Country: United States
- State: Washington
- County: King
- City: Seattle
- ZIP Code: 98109
- Area code: 206, 564

South Lake Union (sometimes SLU) (Lushootseed: čaʔkʷšəd) is a neighborhood in central Seattle, Washington, named for its location at the southern tip of Lake Union.

Like most Seattle neighborhoods, its precise boundaries are indeterminate. Its main thoroughfares are the east-west Valley and Mercer Streets and the north-south Dexter, 9th, Westlake, and Fairview Avenues N. and Eastlake Avenue E.

The official boundaries of the City of Seattle Urban Center are Denny Way on the south, beyond which is Denny Triangle; Interstate 5 on the east, beyond which is Capitol Hill; Aurora Avenue N. (State Route 99) and 7th Avenue N. on the west, beyond which is Lower Queen Anne; and Galer Street, Lake Union, and E. Newton Place on the north, beyond which are Westlake and Eastlake. Cornish College of the Arts and Vulcan Inc. properties such as 2200 and 2201 Westlake are officially in Denny Triangle for city planning and zoning purposes but often referred to as South Lake Union. The portion of South Lake Union east of Fairview Avenue N., historically known as Cascade, includes a number of historic structures.

== History ==
=== 19th century ===
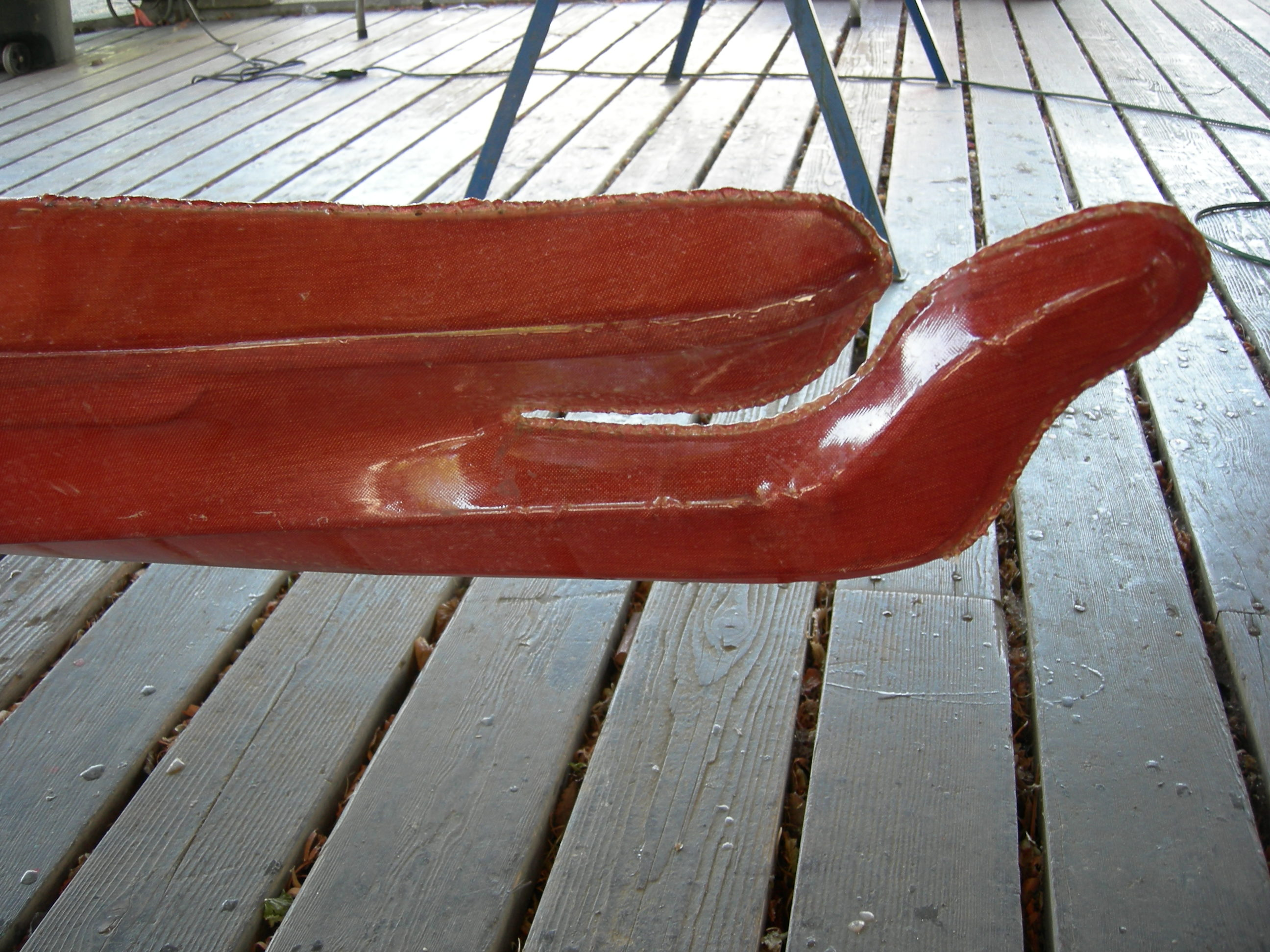
Bow of a traditional-style kayak; Center for Wooden Boats, South Lake Union, 2007.

Lake Union is known in Chinook Jargon as Tenass Chuck ("little water", as against Lake Washington, Hyas Chuck, "big water"). It is similarly known in Lushootseed as meman hartshu, "little lake". When white pioneers arrived in the 1850s, Native Americans—probably Duwamish or Southern Coast Salish—were encamped near the southwest corner of the lake and along a stream near the present-day corner of 8th and Thomas; another stream ran near Boren Avenue. There was a trail from the south end of the lake to Elliott Bay. At the time, there were deer and elk in the area; natives also ate fish, clams, root vegetables, camas, bracken, wapato and berries. Significant native settlement in South Lake Union lasted until 1875, when a windstorm knocked over a tree, destroying a longhouse in what is now Cascade.

Pioneer David Denny (of the Denny Party) staked a claim in 1853. Denny's claim ran from South Lake Union (where the lake extended farther to the south and west than it does today) south to what is now Denny Way and west to include the area that is now the Seattle Center grounds. In 1882, the Lake Union and Lumber Company established a sawmill (the city's largest) on the south shore of the lake, near what is now the corner of Mercer and Westlake; Denny bought it in 1884, renaming it the Western Mill. He cleared the land along the south shore of the lake and, in 1885, cut a weir from Portage Bay at the northeast corner of the lake to Lake Washington, which allowed logs to be floated to Lake Union, so that the entire area of the larger Lake Washington was a catchment for his mill.

Denny operated the Western Mill until 1895, and many of his employees settled nearby, some with families. During this time other mills opened in the area. In addition, the lake became a link in the transport of coal, which came from near Issaquah via Lake Washington, wagon to Portage Bay and thence to Lake Union. At first, coal was transported from South Lake Union to the downtown docks by wagon, then from 1872 to about 1877 on a narrow-gauge railroad that followed the route of present-day Westlake Avenue to Pike Street. The railroad, however, was abandoned, and the route degenerated back to a wagon trail.

=== 20th century ===
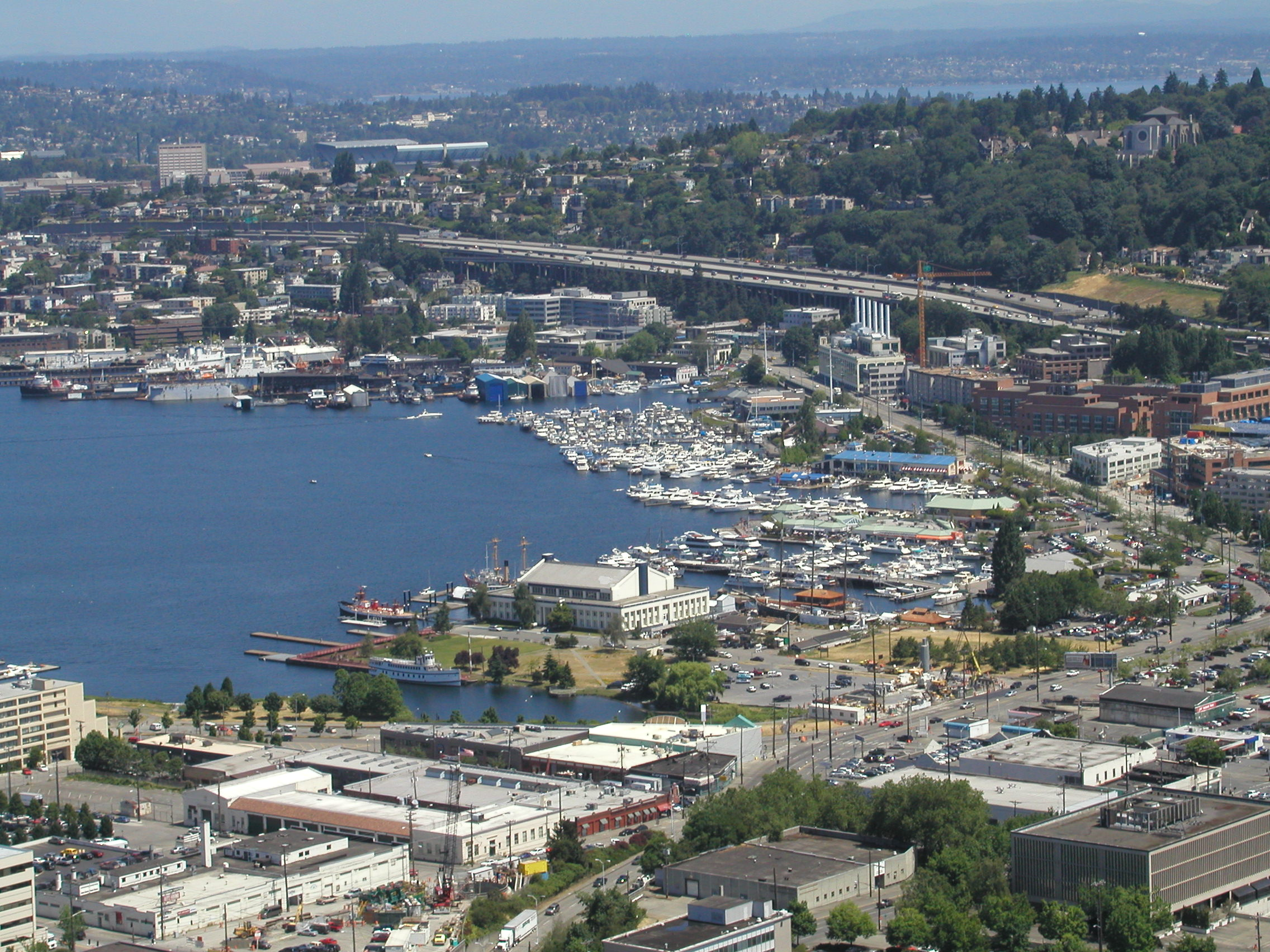
South Lake Union, with Lake Union Park in the center and I-5 and Eastlake in the background, as seen from the Space Needle.

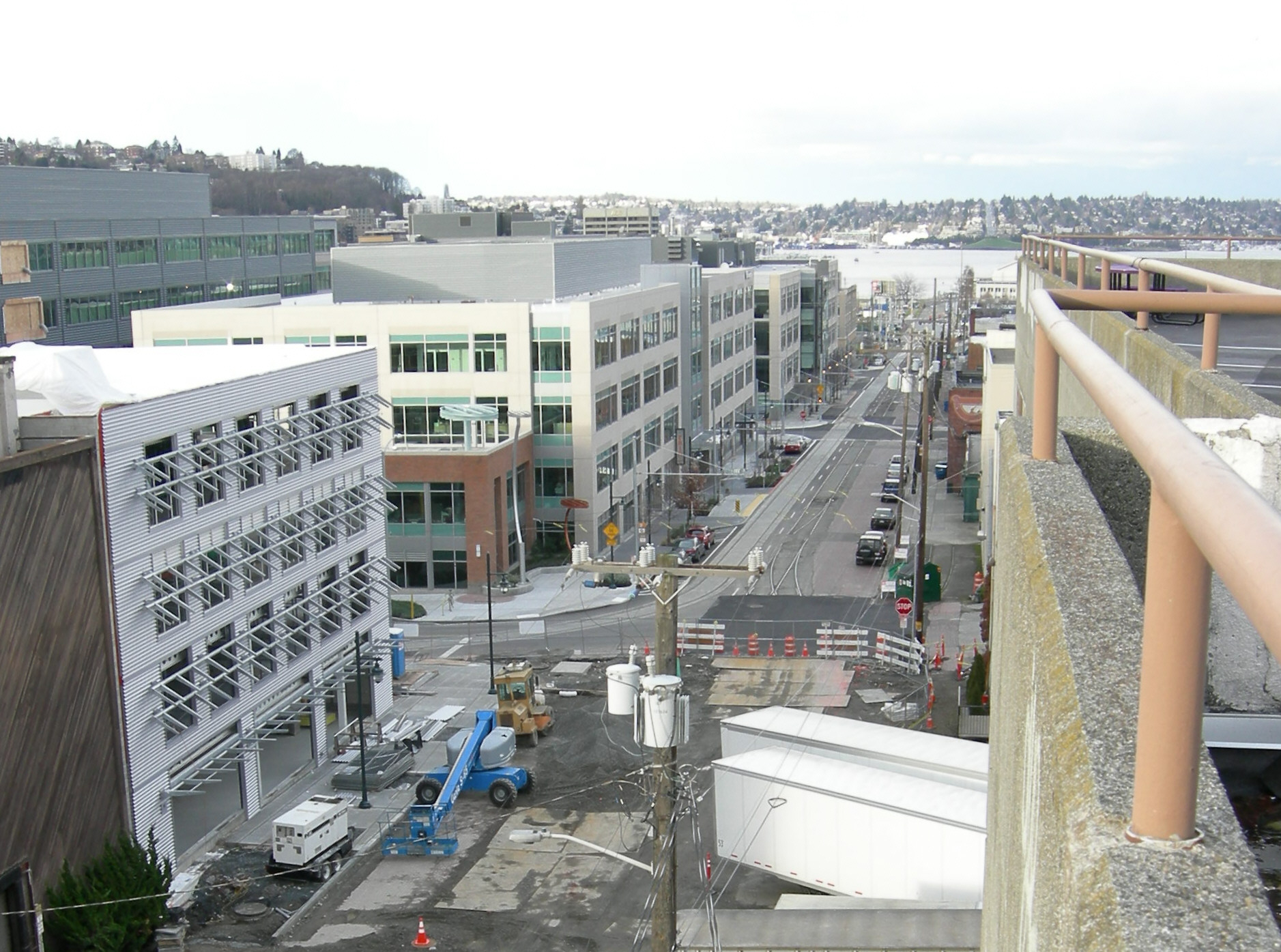
Looking north on Terry Avenue N to Lake Union (2007)

After David Denny's bankruptcy 1895, this mill operated until the 1920s under new ownership of Brace / Hergert Mill Company. In 1909 Brace & Hergert extended their mill into the lake building a peninsula, now known as Lake Union Park. The last remaining portion of the mill business was Brace Lumber Company which operated from 1925 to 1988, the end of the mill era. The area also saw a growth in manufacturing toward the turn of the century. Cabinetry and furniture led the way in the 1890s, followed by shipbuilding, Bill Boeing's first airplane factory, manufacturing seaplanes and, in Cascade, Seattle City Light's Hydro House (1912) and Lake Union Steam Plant (1914) and the first Ford Model T assembly plant west of the Mississippi River (1914). Both of these buildings now have landmark status. The former steam plant now houses Zymogenetics and the former Ford building is used for rental storage space. Meanwhile, the Northern Pacific Railway ran a railroad line around Lake Union and down Terry Avenue, where a freight station opened in 1913.

With industrial and commercial growth, more residential centers sprang up to house company employees and other residents. Preeminent among these residential centers was Cascade. At the center of the community established by the Russians, Swedes, Norwegians, and Greeks who settled there in the late 19th and early 20th centuries was the Cascade School (built 1894; demolished after the 1949 Olympia earthquake), a public elementary school from which the neighborhood took its name. From the 1930s, South Lake Union became less residential, evolving into an area of small business, warehouses and auto-oriented services. Cascade slowly lost its identity as a neighborhood distinct from the rest of South Lake Union, especially after construction of Interstate 5 cut it off from Capitol Hill.

When the Lake Washington Ship Canal opened in 1917, the locks at Ballard kept Lake Union at its historic level, while the canal gave it a water connection both to Lake Washington and to Puget Sound, an arm of the Pacific Ocean. This was a further boon to industrial and commercial development. Many timber-framed buildings survive from this era, with masonry exterior walls of brick or, for some commercial buildings, terracotta. For a time, the Cascade Neighborhood held numerous automobile dealerships; the surviving Ford McKay and Pacific McKay buildings are examples. Most of the city's large laundries were in the area, especially in Cascade although the large, surviving Troy Laundry Building (1927) is immediately west of Fairview Avenue E. These were soon joined by the Seattle Times Building (1930).

In the early 1990s, The Seattle Times columnist John Hinterberger proposed redeveloping the area into a large green space something like New York's Central Park, loosely based on parts of Virgil Bogue's 1911 Bogue Plan. This plan became known as the Seattle Commons and evolved to include mixed-income housing, retail, and commercial space on the park edges. Microsoft co-founder Paul Allen donated $20 million to buy property for the Seattle Commons, which reverted to his ownership after the proposal was defeated by public votes in 1995 and 1996.

=== 21st century ===
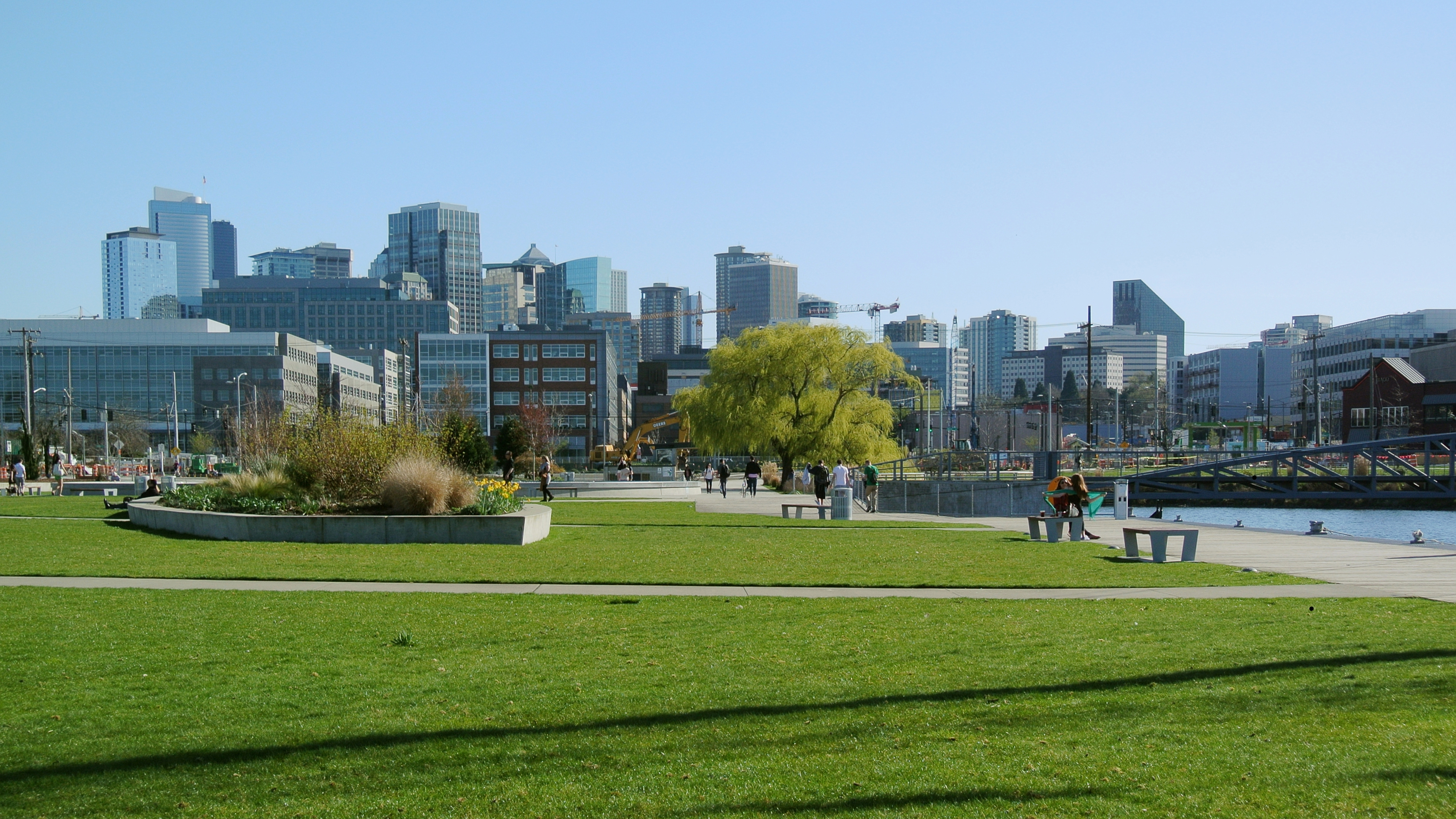
South Lake Union and downtown Seattle as seen from Lake Union Park.

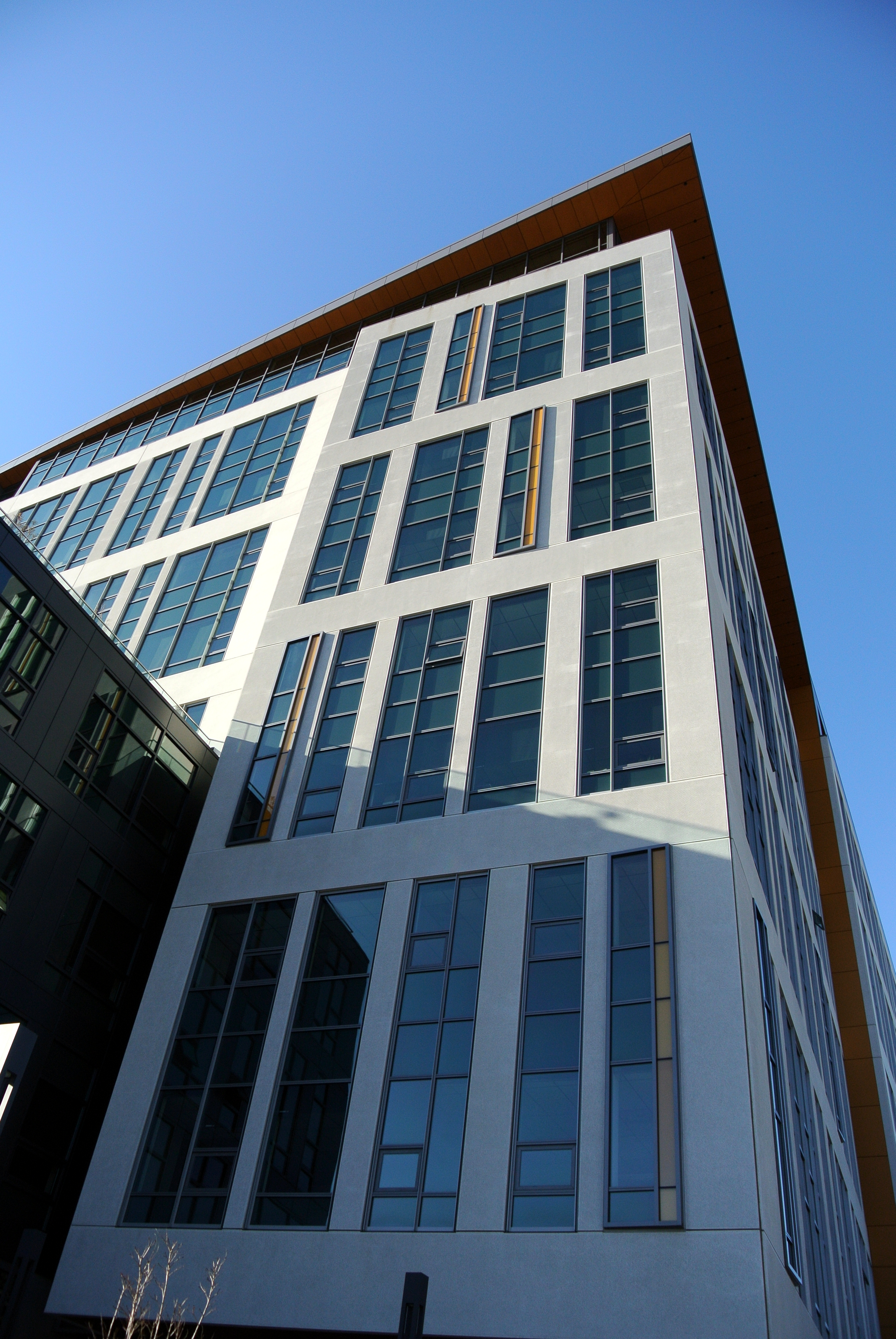
Amazon.com headquarters building in South Lake Union

Only a few of the older residential and light industrial structures of historic Cascade Neighborhood retain their original uses today; the historic Immanuel Lutheran Church and Saint Spiridon Orthodox Cathedral remain. Within the boundaries of Cascade Neighborhood as of 2008 are the REI flagship store, NBBJ architects (in the Alley24 office and apartment development built around the landmark New Richmond Laundry Building), the headquarters of PEMCO, the Fred Hutchinson Cancer Research Center and the headquarters of Zymogenetics (in the old City Light Steam Plant).

Elsewhere in South Lake Union the picture is similar. Quite a few older buildings survive, but few retain their historic uses.

In April 2008, the new Lake Union Park opened to the public with a pedestrian bridge across the western waterway, a walkway along the waterfront, 1.6 acres (6,500 m^{2}) of green space, landscaping and much more. The 12-acre (49,000 m^{2}) park was completed in 2010. The historic ships wharf provides long-term moorage for historic vessels; and the Maritime Heritage Center will provide an array of cultural, educational, and recreational activities. Vessels currently moored at the wharf include the steamer Virginia V, the lightship Swiftsure, the tug Arthur Foss, the fireboat Duwamish, and the salmon troller Twilight. The schooner Wawona was also moored nearby at Northwest Seaport until it was dismantled in 2009. Several smaller historic boats are just to the east at the Center for Wooden Boats.

In December 2007, Amazon announced it would be consolidating its Seattle offices in South Lake Union; occupancy began in 2010.

Opened in December 2012, the Museum of History & Industry relocated from Seattle's Montlake neighborhood to the former Naval Reserve Training Center, or "Armory."

Around 2017, the city addressed transportation problems by changing Mercer Street into a two-way, six-lane, tree-lined boulevard, and Valley Street into a two-way, pedestrian-friendly road.

South Lake Union is also home to Denny Park, the oldest park in the city.

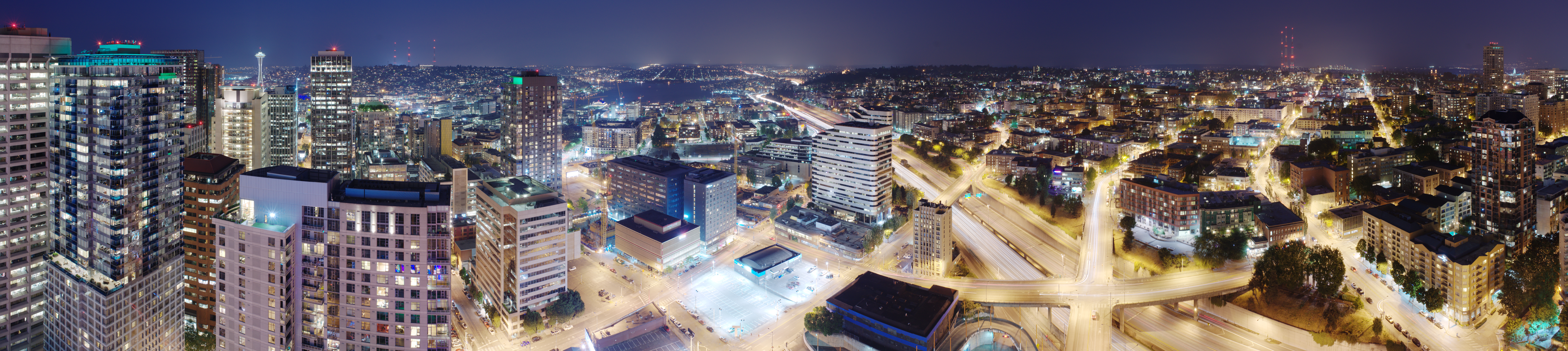
South Lake Union (center) is separated from Capitol Hill (right) by Interstate 5.

== Future as a hub for life sciences ==
Due to recent development plans by Paul Allen's Vulcan Inc., as well as other prominent developers, South Lake Union is becoming a hub for life science organizations. Some in the area include: Fred Hutchinson Cancer Research Center, the Allen Institute for Brain Science, the Allen Institute for Cell Science, Zymogenetics, Battelle, Seattle Biomedical Research Institute, Seattle Children's Hospital, PATH, Rosetta (now part of Merck & Co.), Bio-Rad, and University of Washington Medicine.

The South Lake Union Campus of the University of Washington School of Medicine now includes 1250 people (researchers and staff) in four buildings. The oldest is the Brotman Building (the former home of Washington Natural Gas, when it was known as the "Blue Flame building") at 815 Mercer St, which houses 4 floors of biotechnology and medical research laboratories. Among the varied research areas are four Centers, focused on Allergy & Inflammation, Cardiovascular Biology & Regenerative Medicine, Lung Biology and Translational Medicine in Women's Health.

The plan for development of a biotechnology hub in South Lake Union has been somewhat controversial, as it is seen by some as an example of influential private companies receiving benefits from the city. There were early worries that formerly affordable housing would be destroyed and not replaced. The non-profit Low-Income Housing Institute (LIHI) now has 5 buildings in the Cascade Neighborhood and Denny Triangle. Vulcan Real Estate opened the work-force Borealis Apartments on May 20, 2008. Alley24 has 20% of its units set aside for those earning less than 60% of the median income. Additionally, Seattle's Office of Housing began construction of the affordable Cascade Senior Housing in July 2008.

In 2007, the South Lake Union Streetcar began operation, connecting Westlake Center to the south end of Lake Union at Yale Avenue N., near the Cascade Neighborhood, and Fred Hutchinson Cancer Research Center.

== Housing ==
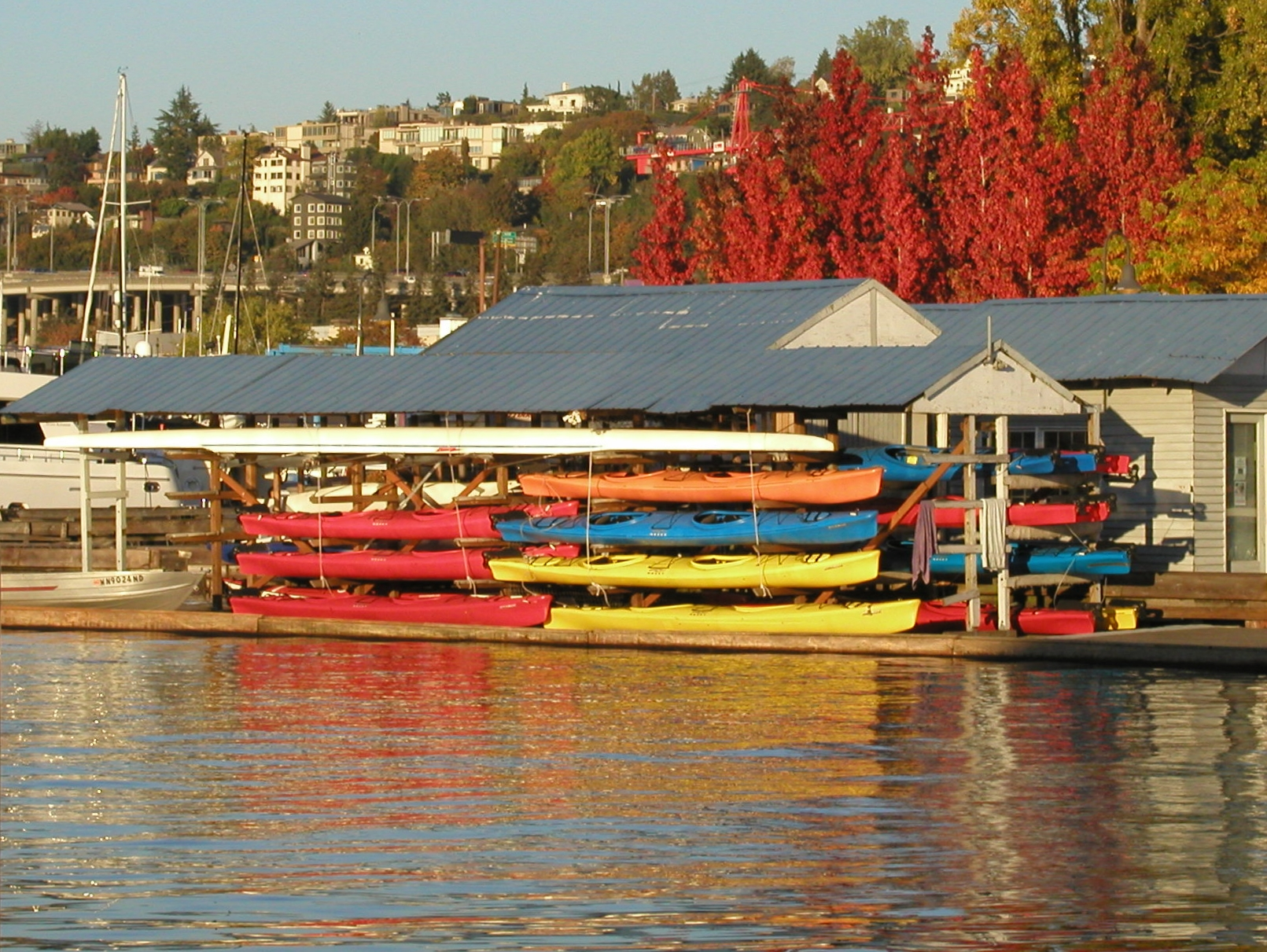
Kayaks in storage in South Lake Union

In early Seattle history, South Lake Union had housing for both workers and owners of mills on Lake Union, including David Denny's residence at Dexter Ave N and Republican St. By the 1960s, landowners including the Seattle Times demolished acres of housing for parking lots, leaving the Cascade Neighborhood as the only district with many residential options. As early as 1972, the mayor's "In-City Living Task Force" proposed the creation of 50,000 housing units in high-rise apartments in South Lake Union and Belltown. Since an economic redevelopment was initiated by the City Council in 2003, South Lake Union has seen a marked increase in housing with 1,850 new units, or 2,000,000 square feet (190,000 m^{2}) of housing, either completed or scheduled to be completed by the end of 2008. While most of the additional housing is market-rate, community affordable housing advocates succeeded in requiring a significant number of units for "the [formerly] homeless, low-income and mentally ill."

== Economy ==
Jones Soda Company used to have its headquarters in South Lake Union. Amazon has over 25 buildings and thousands of employees in its SLU campus with more in the adjacent Denny Triangle neighborhood.

In October 2012, Amazon announced it would spend over $1 billion to purchase its South Lake Union corporate headquarters from Microsoft co-founder Paul Allen's investment firm. Based on the value of the deal, Amazon would pay the highest ever price for an office building over 100,000 square feet in Seattle at around $644 per square foot, more than double the then-current average rate of $308 per square foot for the city's office space, according to Real Capital Analytics.

In the 2010s, both Google and Facebook opened offices in South Lake Union.

== Green space ==
- Denny Park
- Cascade Playground
- Lake Union Park
  - Northwest Seaport
  - Center for Wooden Boats

== Landmarks and historic sites ==
For landmarks and historic sites in Cascade (using the city's current official definition of that neighborhood) see Cascade, Seattle. With the exception of the Pacific McKay and Ford McKay buildings and the boats at Northwest Seaport, all of these landmarks fall within the maximum extent of Cascade, as the neighborhood was understood in the early 20th century.

Building or structure	Address	Listing	Photo
Tugboat Arthur Foss	Officially listed in Kirkland, Washington but now docks at Northwest Seaport, Lake Union Park	NRHP	
Excursion Boat Virginia V	Docks at Northwest Seaport, Lake Union Park	Seattle landmark NRHP	
Fireboat Duwamish	Docks at Northwest Seaport, Lake Union Park	Seattle landmark NRHP	
Lightship Relief / Swiftsure	Docks at Northwest Seaport, Lake Union Park	Seattle landmark |NRHP	
Pacific McKay and Ford McKay buildings	601-15 Westlake Ave. N	Seattle landmark	
R-class sloop Pirate	Docks at Center for Wooden Boats	NRHP	
Schooner Wawona; No longer seaworthy	Dismantled in 2009.	Seattle landmark NRHP	
Seattle First National Bank Building	566 Denny Way	Seattle landmark	
Seattle Times Building	1120 John St.	Seattle landmark	
Troy Laundry Building; As of 2008, used by the Seattle Times as a warehouse	311–329 Fairview Ave. N	Seattle landmark	
Van Vorst Building	413–421 Boren Ave. N	Seattle landmark	
West Earth Co. Street Clock	406 Dexter Ave. N	Seattle landmark	
William Volker Building; Now part of Cornish College of the Arts	1000 Lenora Street	NRHP	
Schooner Zodiac	Home port is now in Bellingham, Washington, but often docks at the Center for Wooden Boats	NRHP	

Raisbeck Performance Hall, a former Sons of Norway hall, is now part of Cornish College of the Arts. It sits just south of Denny Way near the William Volker Building (see list above, which is also part of Cornish. Hence, it is officially just outside South Lake Union.

Building or structure	Address	Listing	Photo
Old Norway Hall; Now Raisbeck Performance Hall	2015 Boren Ave.	Seattle landmark	
Naval Reserve Armory (Museum of History and Industry since 2013)	800 Terry Ave. N.	Seattle landmark	
