= Duwamish (fireboat) =

Fireboat

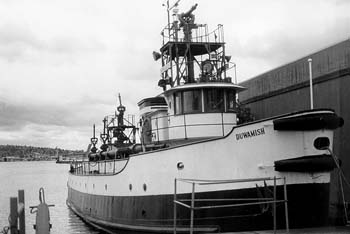
- Duwamish fireboat at the Hiram M. Chittenden Locks, Seattle

History

United States
- Name: Duwamish
- Builder: Richmond Beach Shipbuilding Co.
- Launched: 1909
- Out of service: 1985
- Status: Museum ship

General characteristics
- Tonnage: 322 tons (gross)
- Length: 120 ft (37 m)
- Beam: 28 ft (8.5 m)
- Depth: 9.6 ft (2.9 m)
- Installed power: Compound marine steam engines
- Speed: 10.5 knots (19.4 km/h; 12.1 mph)
- Duwamish (fireboat)
- U.S. National Register of Historic Places
- U.S. National Historic Landmark
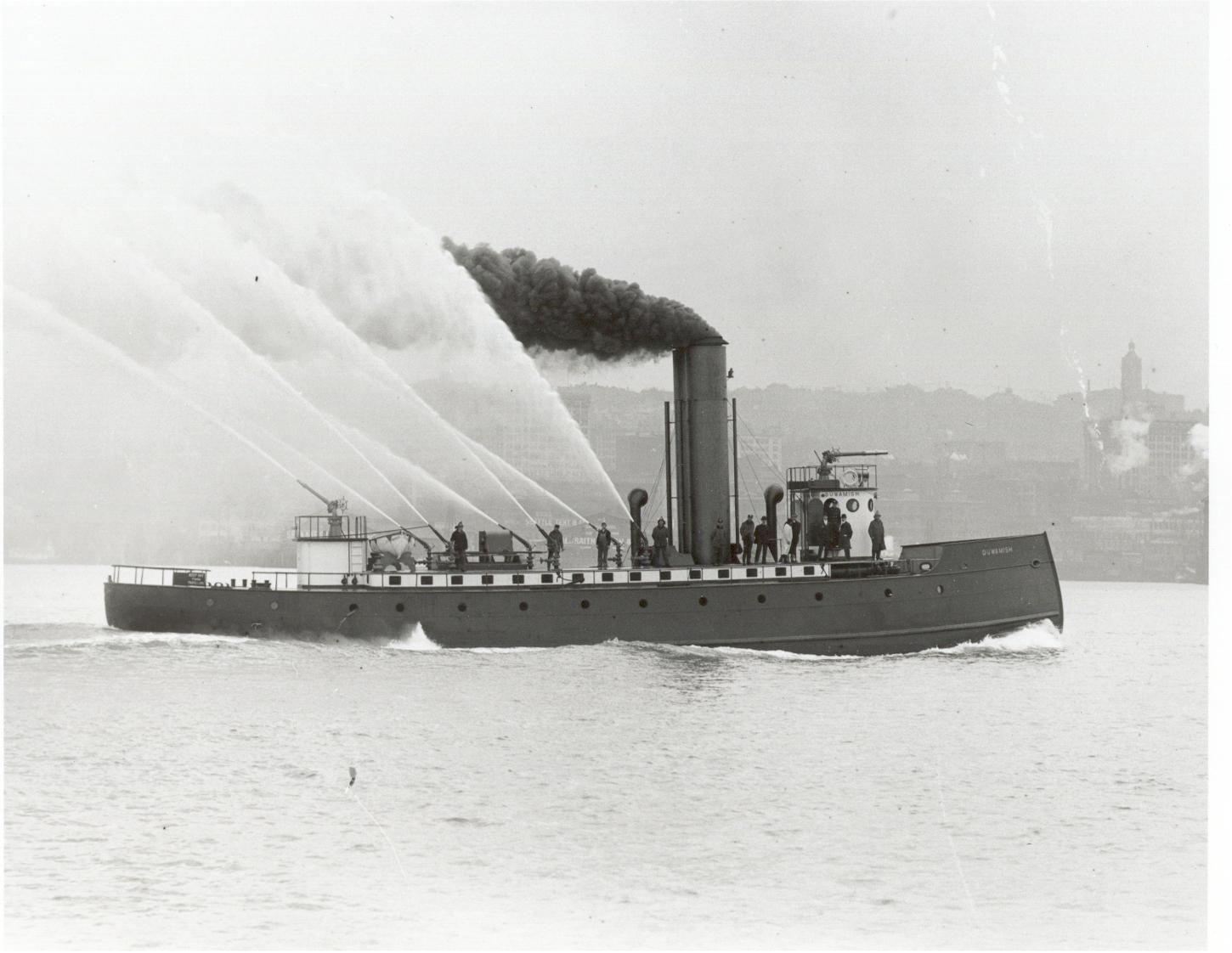
- Originally the Seattle fireboat Duwamish was built with a ram bow.

- Location within Washington (state)
- Coordinates: 47°37′41″N 122°20′11″W
- Built: 1909
- Architect: Richmond Beach Shipbuilding Co.
- NRHP reference No.: 89001448

Significant dates
- Added to NRHP: June 30, 1989
- Designated NHL: June 30, 1989

Duwamish is a retired fireboat in the United States. She is the second oldest vessel designed to fight fires in the US, after Edward M. Cotter, in Buffalo, New York.

== Career ==
Duwamish was built in 1909 for the Seattle Fire Department in Richmond Beach, Washington, just north of Seattle. She was powered by "double vertical (compound) marine steam engines" capable of driving her at 10.5 knots (19.4 km/h; 12.1 mph). She was equipped with three American LaFrance steam piston pumps rated at a capacity of 3,000 US gallons per minute (0.189 m^{3}/s) each. She was originally designed to ram and sink burning wooden vessels, as a last resort, and was equipped with a ram bow for doing so.

On July 30, 1914, Duwamish was involved in fighting the fire on the Grand Trunk Pacific dock. In the 1930s, as a cost-saving measure, the Seattle City Council directed that Duwamish be used as a tug to push the city's garbage scow.

After an upgrade in 1949, the pumps delivered a total of 22,800 US gallons per minute (1.438 m^{3}/s). This capacity was only exceeded in 2003 by the Los Angeles Fire Department's Warner Lawrence, which delivers 38,000 US gallons per minute (2.397 m^{3}/s).

Duwamish is 120 feet (36.6 m) long with a 28-foot (8.5 m) beam and a 9.6-foot (2.9 m) draft. Her registered gross tonnage is 322 short tons (292 t).

== Current status ==
Retired in 1985, Duwamish was purchased by the Puget Sound Fireboat Foundation. She is permanently moored at the Historic Ships Wharf near the Museum of History & Industry at South Lake Union Park in Seattle. Visitors may board the vessel when volunteer staff is available.

Duwamish was declared a National Historic Landmark in 1989.

She is a city landmark.

== See also ==
- Historic preservation
- Duwamish Native American tribe
- Duwamish River
- Sea Scouting (Boy Scouts of America)
