= Seattle Coffee Works =

Seattle-based coffee company

Coordinates: 47.6101°N 122.3406°W

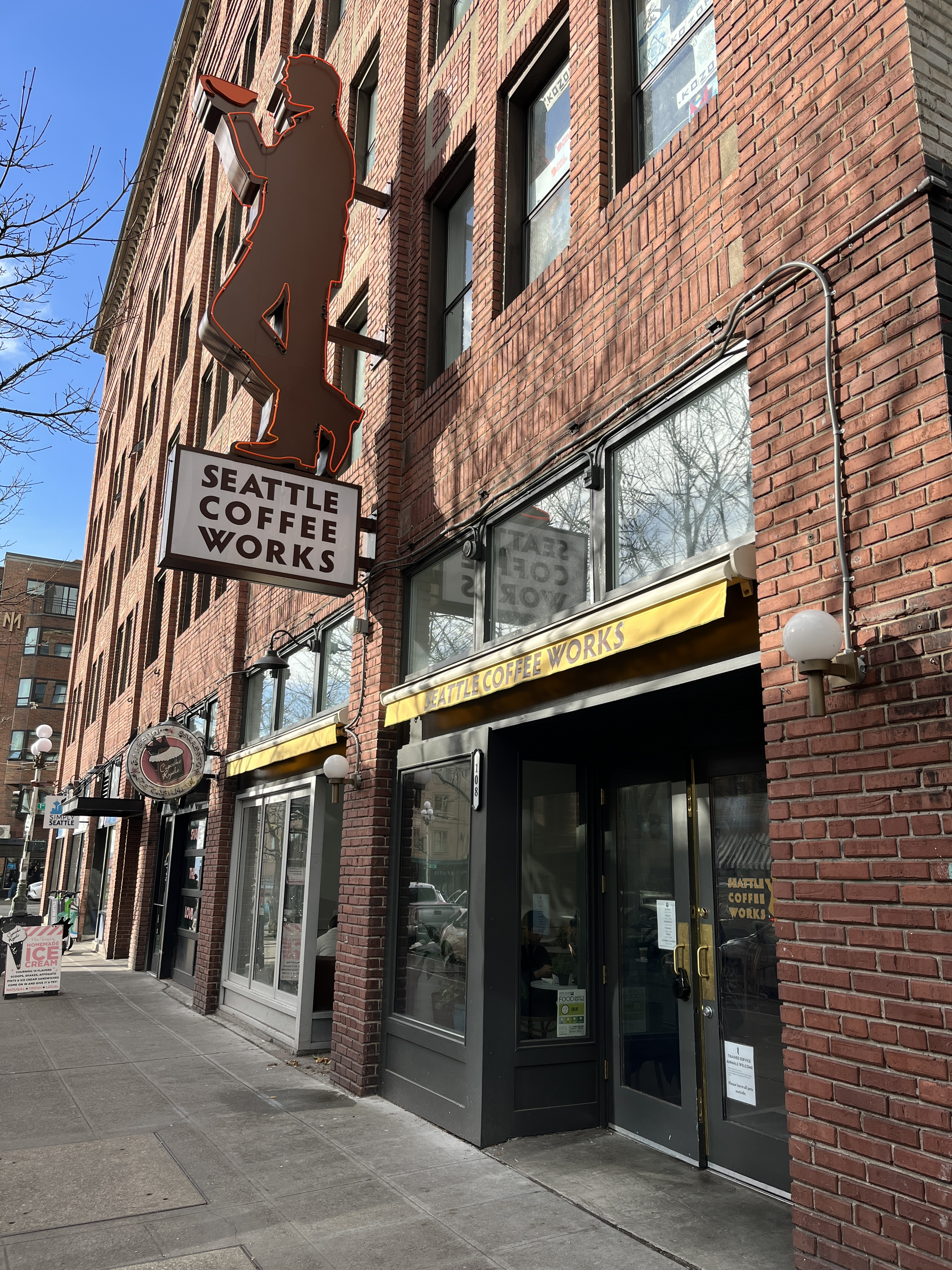
- Exterior of the coffee shop at Pine Street and 1st Avenue, 2023
- Founded: 2006; 20 years ago in Seattle, Washington, U.S.
- Headquarters: Seattle, U.S.
- Number of locations: 3 (2023)
- Area served: Seattle
- Key people: Heather Schmidt (CEO)
- Products: Coffee
- Owner: Vibe Coffee Group
- Website: seattlecoffeeworks.com

Seattle Coffee Works (SCW) is a third-wave coffee company based in Seattle, in the U.S. state of Washington. The business was established in 2006 and operates three coffee shops. In addition to the flagship in downtown Seattle, SCW has outposts in Ballard and South Lake Union, called Ballard Coffee Works and Cascade Coffee Works, respectively. A location on Capitol Hill called Capitol Coffee Works opened in 2017 and closed c. 2022. Previously independently owned and operated by Pipo Bui, Oscar García, and roast master Sebastian Simsch, SCW was acquired by Vibe Coffee Group in 2022.

SCW has garnered a positive reception and has been deemed one of the best coffee shops in the city, Washington, and the United States by various publications and media outlets. In 2011, Andrew Zimmern visited the flagship for a 2012 episode of the Travel Channel series Bizarre Foods America.

== Description ==
The third-wave coffee company Seattle Coffee Works (SCW) has a flagship store in downtown Seattle and has operated outposts in the Ballard, Capitol Hill, and South Lake Union neighborhoods. The company's "Coffee-drinking Man" imagery and signs have been compared to Jonathan Borofsky's Hammering Man. The downtown location has an express bar and a slow bar. Lonely Planet has noted its woody interior. The Ballard location has been described as "airy". Seattle Metropolitan has said SCW is "less espresso factory" and "more reading nook", noting the presence of a macramé chair. SCW's menu includes coffee, espresso, and milk drinks. SCW sold baked goods supplied by The London Plane, as of 2017. SCW had sold an "Obama Blend" of African and Indonesian beans.

== History ==
Established near Seattle's Pike Place Market in 2006, the business was initially operated by Pipo Bui, Oscar García, and roast master Sebastian Simsch. According to Ash Shah of The Daily of the University of Washington, SCW started as a pop-up shop where the owners provided espressos sourced throughout the area. Approximately four years later, they began to produce their own coffee.

SCW has a no-tip policy. According to The Stranger, the company also publishes an annual "authenticity report" and provides health care and benefits to all employees. In 2021, Inc. magazine's Diana Ransom reported that Simsch thought workers became "generally happier" after wages were raised, noting that "turnover is nil". During the COVID-19 pandemic, the company saw business slow and operated via take-out. SCW also received loans from the Paycheck Protection Program. According to Ransom, Simsch released 20 employees, moving the remaining 15 to a new coffee-subscription service and e-commerce coffee sales.

Heather Schmidt is the company's chief executive officer, as of 2021. The business was independently owned until 2022, when Vibe Coffee Group (the owner of Victrola Coffee Roasters and Whidbey Coffee) announced plans to acquire all four locations.

=== Flagship ===
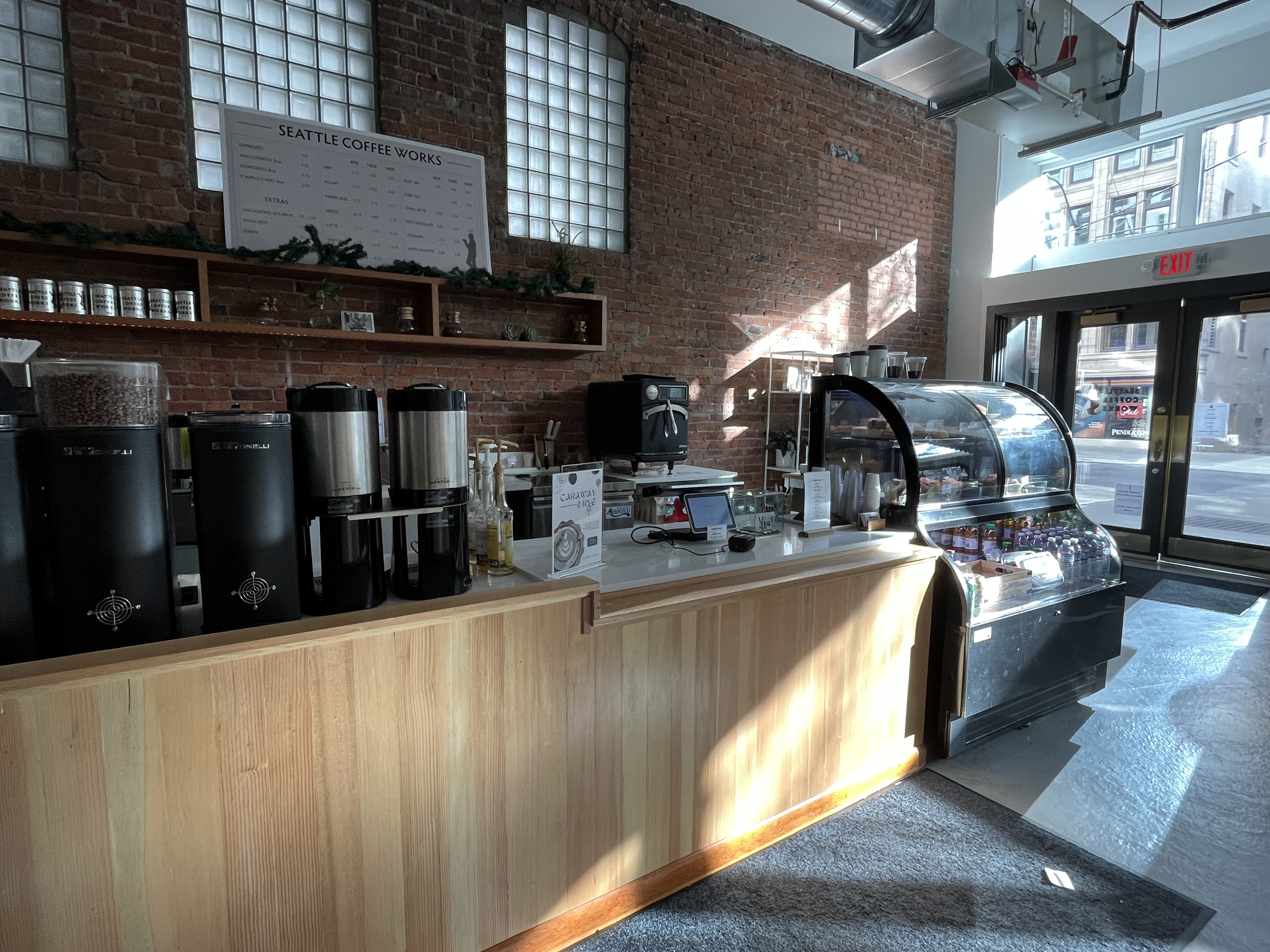
Interior of the coffee shop at Pike Street and 1st Avenue, 2023

In 2007, the Daily Journal of Commerce described SCW's selection of locally roasted coffees, including brands from Caffe D'Arte, Caffè Umbria, and Vashon Coffee Co. The flagship store relocated from the Newmark Tower to the intersection of Pike Street and 1st Avenue in 2009.

In 2009, Simsch described large groups of Starbucks employees visiting for observation. Andrew Zimmern visited SCW in 2011 to feature the business in the first season of the Travel Channel's Bizarre Foods America. The episode of him sampling the 2011 Colombia Cup of Excellence, which retails for $100 a pound, aired in 2012. According to Shalini Gujavarty of Eater Seattle, Zimmern considered the visit one of his "top five experiences" in the city. The taping also allowed customers to sample the Colombia Cup of Excellence for free.

In 2010, the Los Angeles Times noted the presence of Wi-Fi and 30 electrical outlets for 40 seats at the downtown location. Simsch selected furniture for the flagship, where he hosted public coffee cuppings at no cost, as of 2018. The shop was vandalized in 2020.

=== Outposts ===
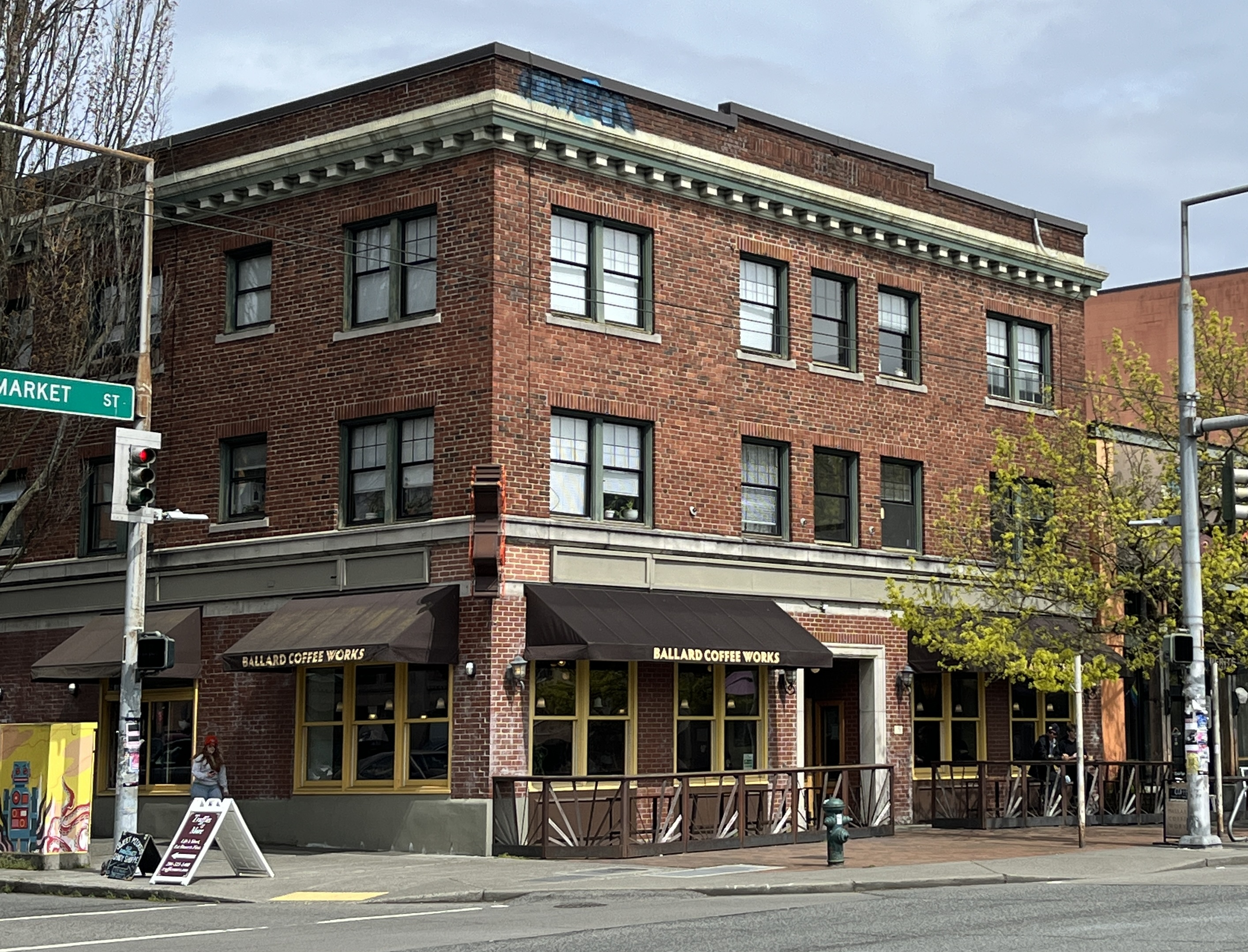
Ballard Coffee Works, 2023

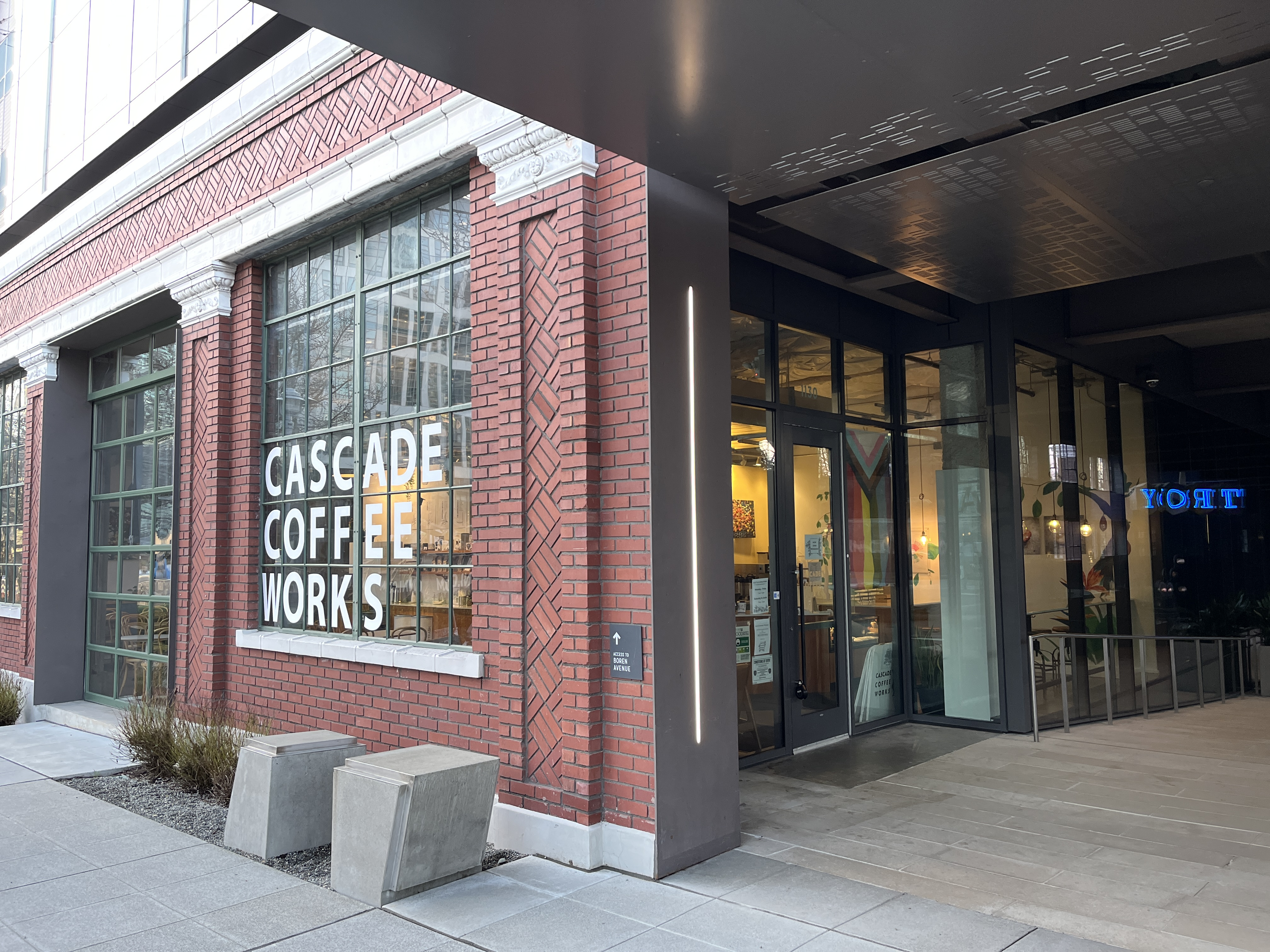
Cascade Coffee Works, 2023

Outposts have operated as Ballard Coffee Works, Capitol Coffee Works, and Cascade Coffee Works.

The Ballard location opened in March 2012, in a former bank building and Tully's location. The shop was vandalized in 2021. A third location opened at Broadway and Pike on Capitol Hill in 2017. The coffee shop closed c. 2022, and was replaced by Ben & Esther's Vegan Jewish Deli.

Cascade Coffee Works opened in South Lake Union in 2017. Free coffee was distributed at the grand opening. The coffee shop operates a retail space on the ground floor of a block, which has been occupied by Amazon and houses the Troy Laundry Building.

== Reception ==
The Not for Tourists Guide to Seattle has said, "To these guys, making coffee is not work." The guide series has also said the coffee at the Ballard shop "definitely works". Writing for The Oregonian, Caroline Cummins said in 2010 that since the coffee shop is close the Pike Place Market, SCW could feel "overwhelmingly touristy" and recommended the Slow Bar.

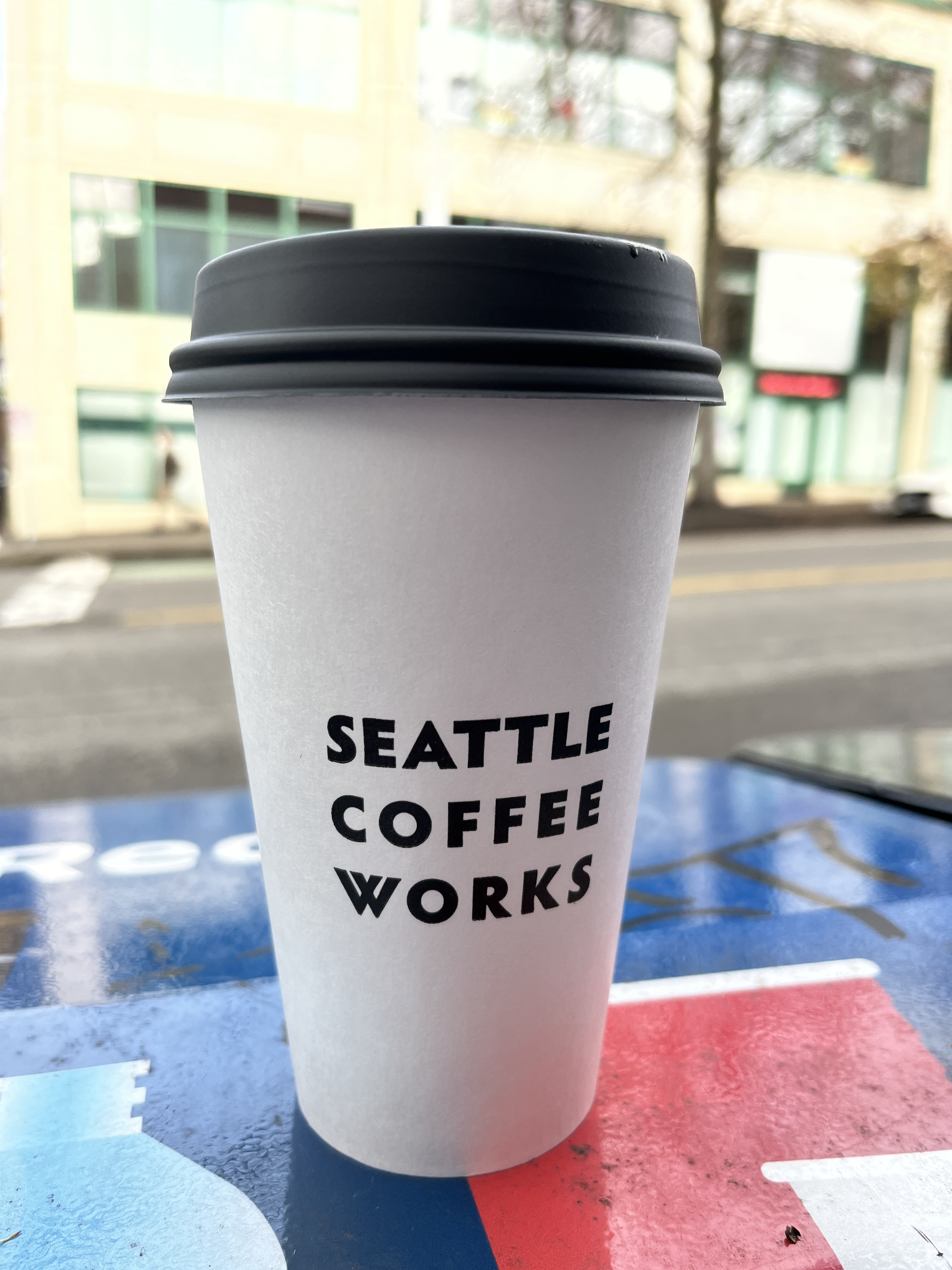
Branded paper cup in 2023

Molly Hannon included the Ballard location in Men's Journal's 2011 list of the best coffee shops in the U.S. The magazine's Tyler Coates has also included Ballard Coffee Works in a list of the nation's 40 best coffee shops. The Pike Street location was deemed the best coffee shop for cuppings by Marriott Hotels & Resorts in 2013. KSTW included SCW in a 2016 list of the city's "best craft coffee spots". In 2017 and 2019, writers for CNN called SCW a "solid pick" in overviews of the world's best cities for coffee. The Stranger said the business offered Seattle's best coffee in a 2017 overview of "advice to Seattle newcomers from newcomers".

Writers for the Seattle Post-Intelligencer included SCW in 2019 and 2021 lists of the city's nine best places for hot chocolate. The business was included in the Daily Hive's 2019 list of 10 "Seattle coffee shops aficionados can't afford to miss", 2020 list of the city's 12 best coffee shops, and 2022 list of seven "perfect places to study" in Seattle. In 2021, Mia Mercado selected SCW to represent Washington in Eat This, Not That's list of the best coffee shops for each U.S. state. Jen Woo included the business in Time Out Seattle's 2021 overview of the city's best coffee. In Moon Baseball Road Trips (2021), Timothy Malcolm said "the service [at the Pine Street location] is so on point that you'll get your cup within three minutes".

Thrillist has said, "Forget Starbucks" and commented that SCW serves "blended brews" and "buzzy" drinks. In 2014, the website's Dan Gentile included SCW in a list of the 21 best coffee shops in the U.S. He also included SCW in a 2015 list of the nations' eight best "coffee cities", writing, "Starbucks might be the biggest thing to put Seattle on the map, but any self-respecting coffee snob will look right past it, posting up at the slow bar" at SCW. Thrillist's Naomi Tomky included the company in a 2016 list of "Seattle restaurant chains that should go national" and the downtown location in a 2020 list of the city's best craft coffee shops.

== See also ==
- List of coffeehouse chains
- List of restaurant chains in the United States
