= Center for Wooden Boats =

Museum on the south shore of Lake Union, Seattle, Washington, U.S.

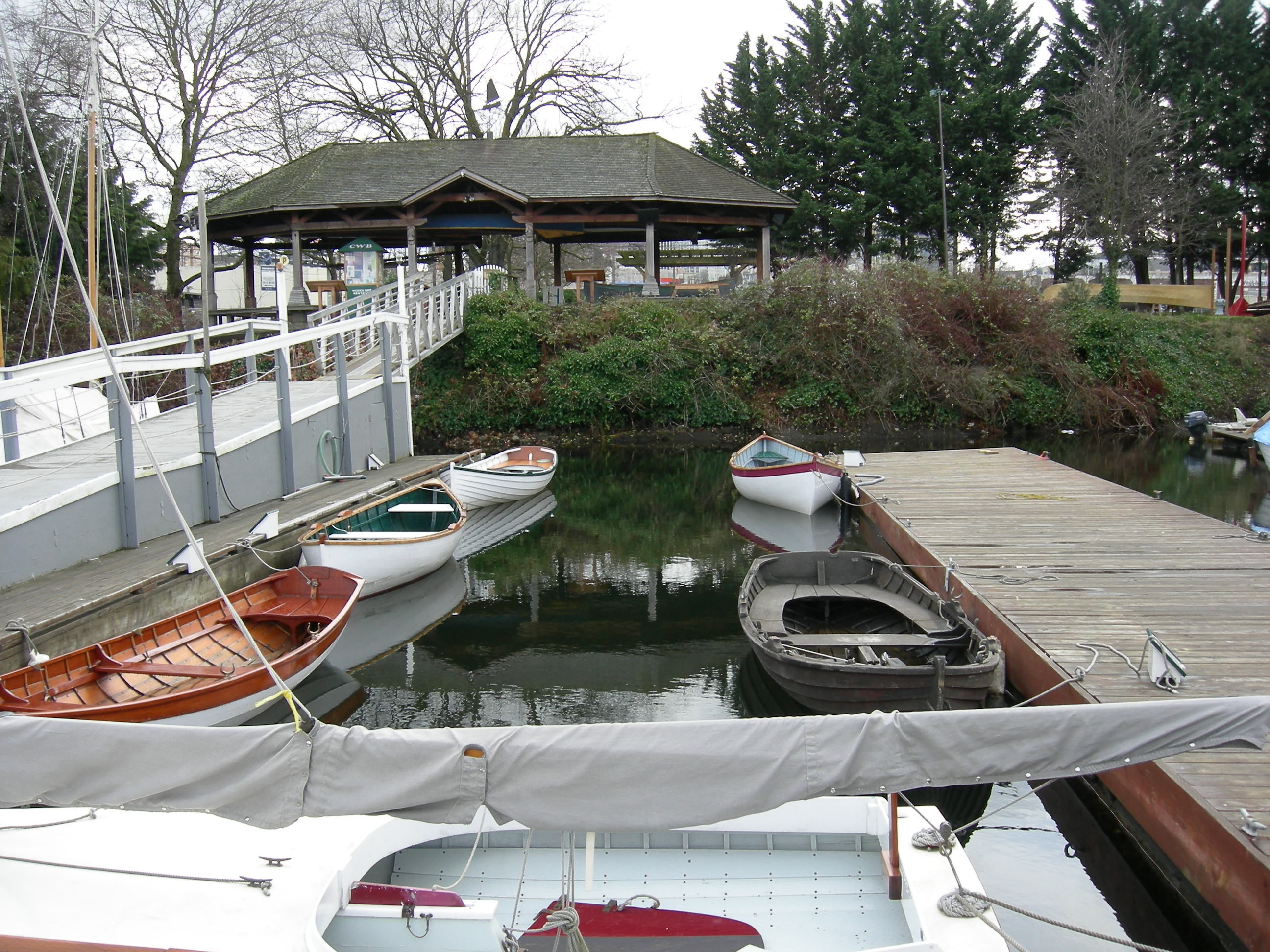
- CWB's "lagoon", with a Beetle Cat in the foreground and several wooden rowboats in the background
- Location: 1010 Valley Street; Seattle, Washington
- Coordinates: 47°37′35″N 122°20′09″W
- Website: cwb.org

The Center for Wooden Boats (CWB) is a museum dedicated to preserving and documenting the maritime history of the Pacific Northwest area of the United States. CWB was founded by Dick Wagner in Seattle in the 1970s and has grown to include three sites; the South Lake Union campus in Lake Union Park, the Northlake Workshop & Warehouse at the north end of Lake Union, and The Center for Wooden Boats at Cama Beach State Park on Camano Island. As of October 2024, due to park infrastructure issues, the Cama Beach location is no longer in operation.

== Collection ==
The CWB collection includes more than 170 vessels, mostly small sailboats and rowboats. The boats are divided into a number of sections. The livery fleet includes daysailers, rowboats, and two pedal boats.

The 20-foot (6.1 m) Blanchard Junior Knockabout is the mainstay of CWB's rental fleet. These boats were designed and built at the Blanchard Boat Company on Lake Union. They have eight, which are used for teaching and rentals.

== See also ==
- Lake Union Park
- Lake Union
- List of maritime museums in the United States
- Myrtle Edwards Park (Other end of Broad Street)
