= Museum of History & Industry =

Museum in Seattle, Washington

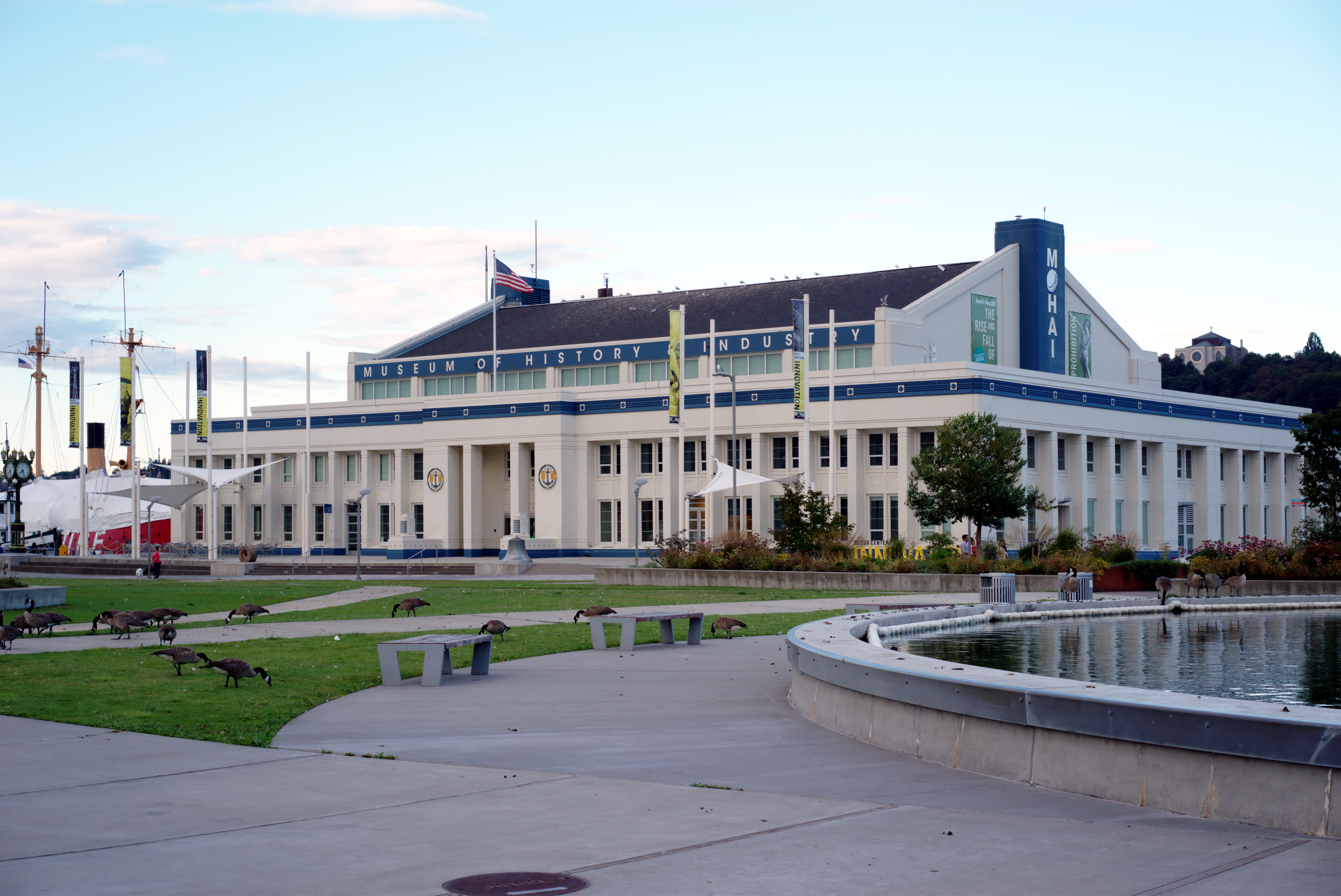
- The MOHAI building (Naval Reserve Armory) at Lake Union Park, pictured in 2015

- Location within Washington (state) Location within the United States
- Established: 1952; 74 years ago
- Location: 860 Terry Ave N. Seattle, Washington, U.S.
- Coordinates: 47°37′39″N 122°20′12″W
- Director: Leonard Garfield
- Public transit access: South Lake Union Streetcar
- Website: mohai.org

The Museum of History & Industry (MOHAI) is a history museum in the South Lake Union neighborhood of Seattle, Washington, United States. It is the largest private heritage organization in Washington state, maintaining a collection of nearly four million artifacts, photographs, and archival materials primarily focusing on Seattle and the greater Puget Sound region. A portion of this collection (roughly 2% at any given time) is on display in the museum's galleries at the historic Naval Reserve Armory in Lake Union Park.

The museum's keynote exhibits include: Boeing's first commercial plane, the 1919 Boeing B-1; the Petticoat Flag, a U.S. flag sewn by women during the 1856 Battle of Seattle; and the Rainier Brewing Company's 12-foot tall neon "R" sign. In addition to both permanent and temporary exhibits, MOHAI administers ongoing youth and adult programming, and regularly hosts public events in partnership with other community organizations, particularly within the South Lake Union neighborhood. MOHAI is accredited by the American Alliance of Museums and is a Smithsonian affiliate museum.

== History ==
In 1911, Morgan and Emily Carkeek hosted the first annual Founder's Day party at their home, which was an invitation-only event where guests dressed in historic costumes and brought artifacts and documents related to early Seattle. An outcome of these parties was the establishment of the Seattle Historical Society in 1914, the membership of which was limited to white settlers and their descendants.

The Seattle Historical Society lacked a building to house the museum. Several attempts to find a permanent location were abandoned because of challenging financial circumstances, especially during the Great Depression, and the fact that the original society members were aging and new members were not joining. The collection continued to grow, however. In 1945, Boeing offered $50,000 towards an aviation wing and, over the next five years, the Society procured a site in Montlake. During this time, the Society became a more public and civic-minded institution, opening up the Founder's Day event to community and service organizations. The new museum opened in 1952.

In the following two decades, turmoil developed behind the scenes over management practices of the museum's collections—including the mishandling and theft of items—dwindling museum membership and the organization's relationship to its neighborhood with increased traffic complaints. Changes in the 1980s included developing new exhibits and reaching out to underrepresented communities, which were a shock to older staff and board members. During the 1990s, the museum gradually recovered from these internal challenges, as well as financial ones, and began expanding educational and community outreach programs.

The impending reconstruction of State Route 520 and the Evergreen Point Floating Bridge forced MOHAI to move from the Montlake site. After exploring options to move near the Washington State Convention Center, MOHAI and the City of Seattle agreed to move MOHAI to the Naval Reserve Armory in what was soon to be Lake Union Park. At that time, the building was being managed by the Seattle Parks and Recreation Department and was in need of significant repairs to be usable as a public museum space. Through a $90 million capital campaign, MOHAI did a full historic restoration of the facility, uncovering both the original ceiling and floor and conducting massive safety, accessibility, and systems upgrades. The project also included centralizing MOHAI's library and collections departments in a warehouse in the Georgetown neighborhood. In June 2012 the museum closed its Montlake location. Six months later, on December 29, 2012, the museum held a public grand opening for its new home in South Lake Union.

== Galleries ==
=== True Northwest: The Seattle Journey ===
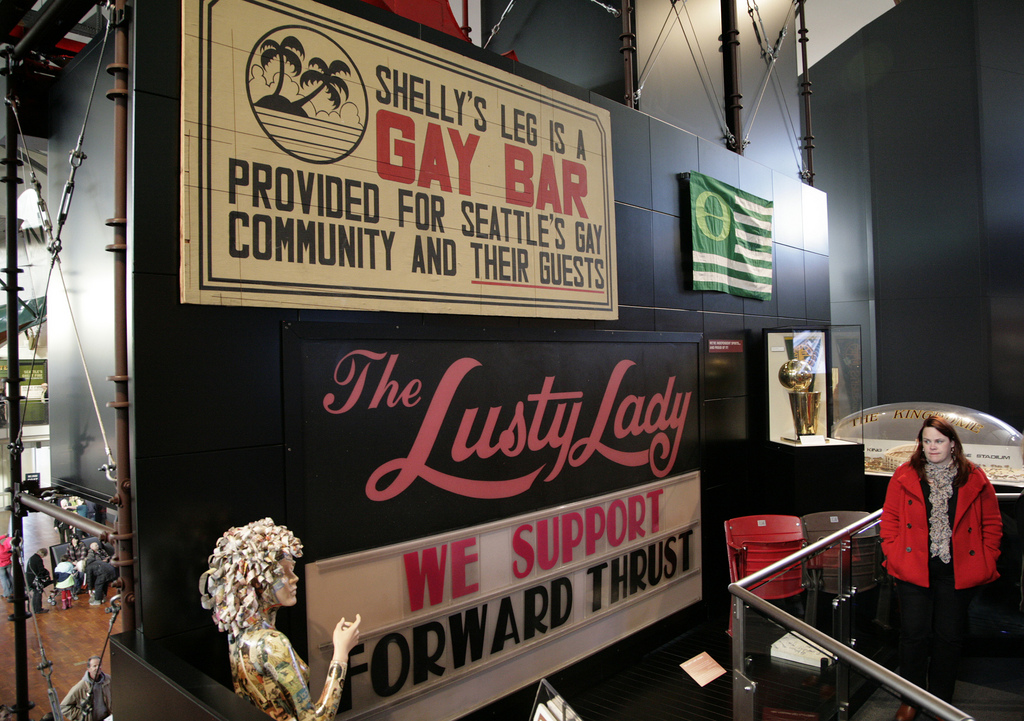
The "Changes" section of MOHAI's True Northwest exhibit

MOHAI's core exhibit rings most of the building's second floor and provides a chronological history of Seattle and its environs. The exhibit winds through a series of 22 different sections that each focus on a distinct event or era in Seattle history ranging from pre-Pioneer settlements up to the modern day. MOHAI Creative Director Ann Farrington, who previously worked on Seattle's Experience Music Project and the National Holocaust Museum, has said that it is, "not a timeline, but a series of stories strung like pearls" in order to reveal how Seattle's past, present, and future are interconnected. Along with numerous artifacts and photographs, the exhibit incorporates a significant amount of interactive media that allow visitors to touch screens or play games that explore different parts of Seattle history and culture. The core exhibit also includes the Great Fire Theatre, a "Gilbert and Sullivan-style opera" that involves artifacts from the 1889 Great Seattle Fire singing the story of the event over a film of historic images, and the Joshua Green Foundation Theater which plays a 7-minute film about Seattle culture on two large screens.

=== Faye G. Allen Grand Atrium ===
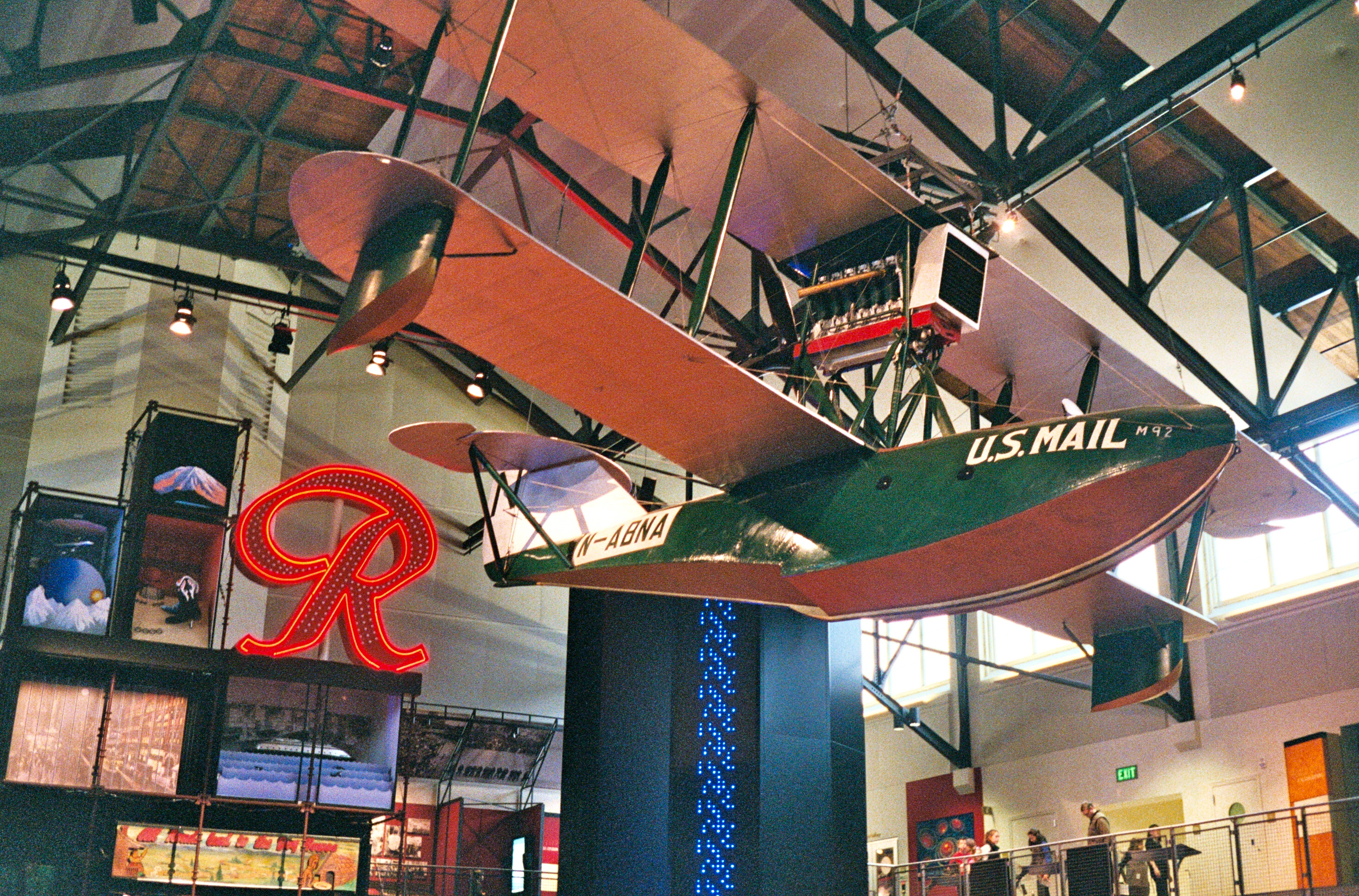
The Boeing B-1 on display in the museum's Grand Atrium, with the Rainier Brewing Company logo sign behind.

The first floor of the museum is an expansive open room named the Faye G. Allen Grand Atrium. Both the original floor and ceiling of the Naval Reserve Building are visible from the Grand Atrium. Hanging in the center of the space is the 1919 Boeing B-1, the first commercial plane built by Bill Boeing. The plane is displayed to illustrate a typical flight path onto Lake Union, where the plane took off and landed during its tenure. On the south end of the Grand Atrium is a three-story tall-grid filled with Seattle cultural icons, including the neon Rainier "R" sign, a clam costume from Seattle seafood chain Ivar's, and a stuffed cougar donated by Eddie Bauer, founder of the namesake clothing store. The north end of the Grand Atrium features a 64-foot-tall sculpture called Wawona by local artist John Grade. Wood and other materials for the sculpture were salvaged from the 1897 schooner Wawona, which was dismantled in 2009 due to a lack of funding for restoration.

=== Walker Special Exhibits Gallery ===
The Walker Gallery is MOHAI's main space for displaying temporary and traveling exhibits. It takes up the entire southern side of the museum's second floor. When the museum initially opened at Lake Union Park, the Walker Gallery showcased an exhibit about Seattle's relationship with film called Celluloid Seattle: A City at the Movies. In 2015, the Walker Gallery hosted American Spirits: The Rise & Fall of Prohibition travelling from the National Constitution Center.

=== Linda and Ted Johnson Family Community Gallery ===
Another temporary gallery that occupies the third floor space of the museum. Much smaller than the Walker Gallery, the space is designed "to promote community ownership and stewardship of MOHAI" by showcasing collaborative projects with community partners. The first exhibit in the gallery was a partnership with leading Seattle arts group Arts Corps, that worked with Seattle high school students to produce poetry and spoken word related to photos from MOHAI's historic photographic collection.

=== McCurdy Family Maritime Gallery ===
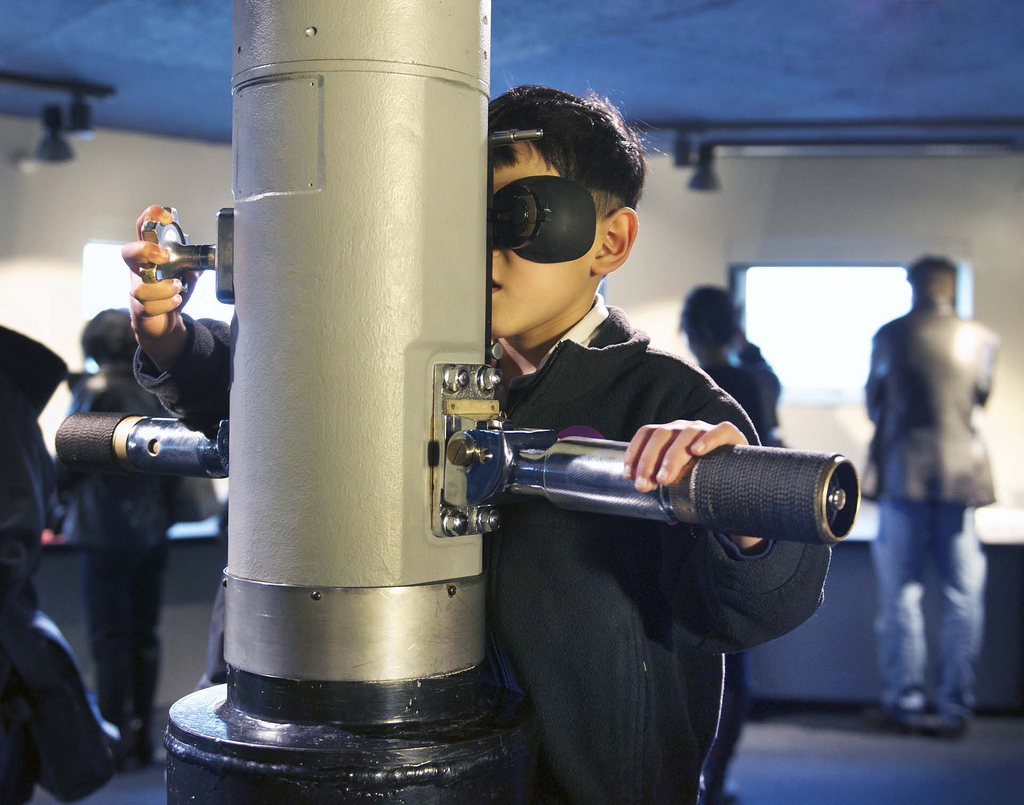
A young visitor looks through the WWII-era TANG periscope in MOHAI's Maritime Gallery

On the top floor of the museum is a small gallery dedicated to Seattle's maritime history. The space was originally designed as a replica of a ship's bridge in order to train naval recruits during World War II and features a set of south facing windows overlooking Lake Union. One of the most popular artifacts in the gallery is a working World War II-era TANG periscope from a naval submarine which offers a 360-degree view of Lake Union and downtown Seattle. The gallery is curated by the Puget Sound Maritime Historical Society which has maintained a close partnership with MOHAI since the early 1950s.

=== Bezos Center for Innovation ===
The museum opened a major museum addition on October 11, 2013 called the Bezos Center for Innovation. The project is funded by a $10 million gift from Amazon founder and CEO Jeff Bezos. The project was designed by Seattle-based Olson Kundig Architects and occupies a portion of the museum's Grand Atrium.

== See also ==
- Arts in Seattle
- History of Seattle
- Bobo (gorilla)
