= Victrola Coffee Roasters =

Company based in Seattle, Washington, U.S.

Restaurant information
- Established: 2000
- Owner: Vibe Coffee Group
- Food type: Coffee and pastries
- Location: 310 E. Pike Street (Flagship), Seattle, Washington, 98122, United States
- Other locations: Capitol Hill and Beacon Hill neighborhoods, Seattle
- Website: www.victrolacoffee.com

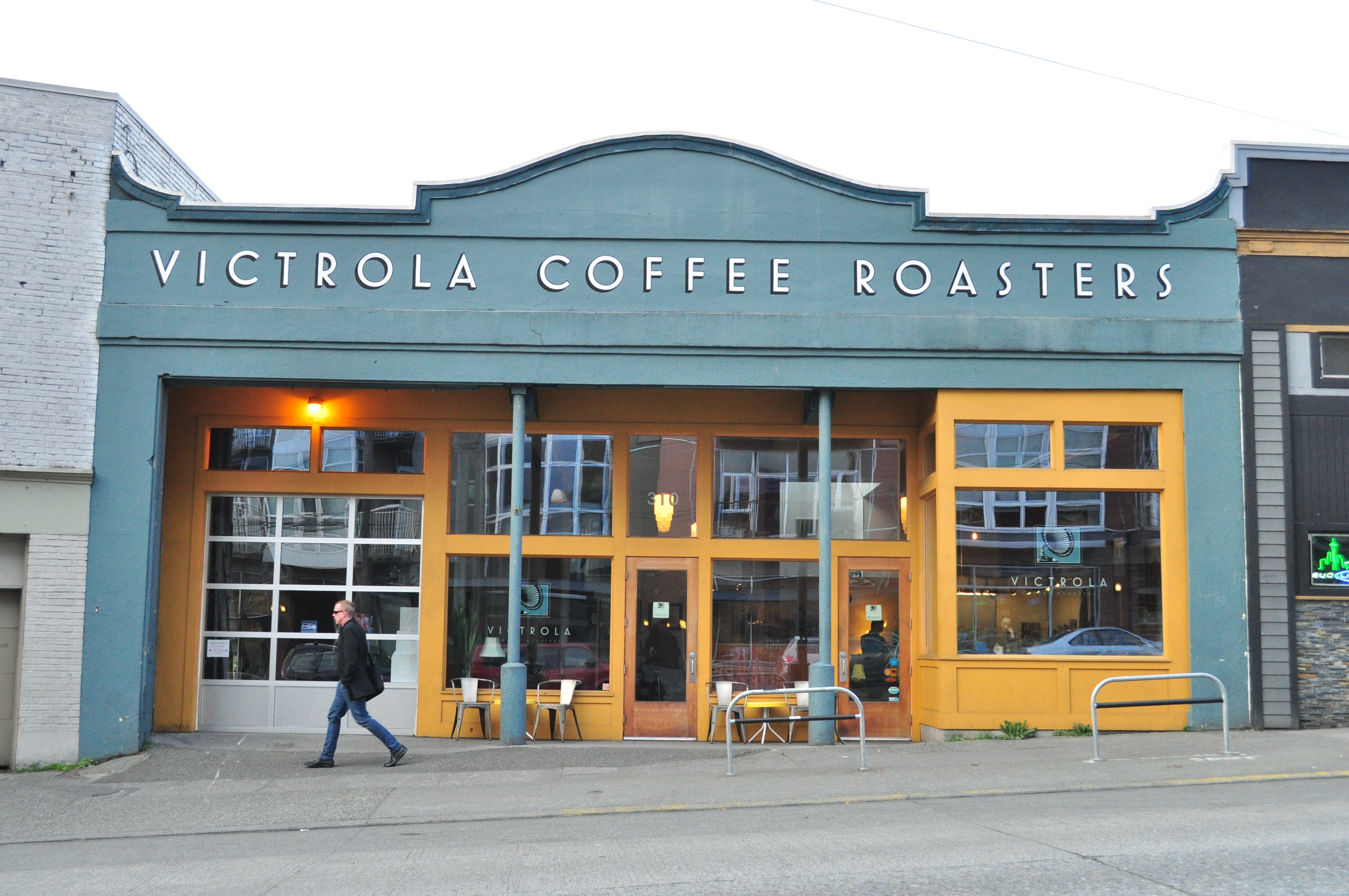
Exterior of the location at 310 E. Pike Street in Capitol Hill, Seattle, in 2014

Victrola Coffee Roasters is a coffee roasting company with multiple locations in Seattle, Washington.

== Description and history ==
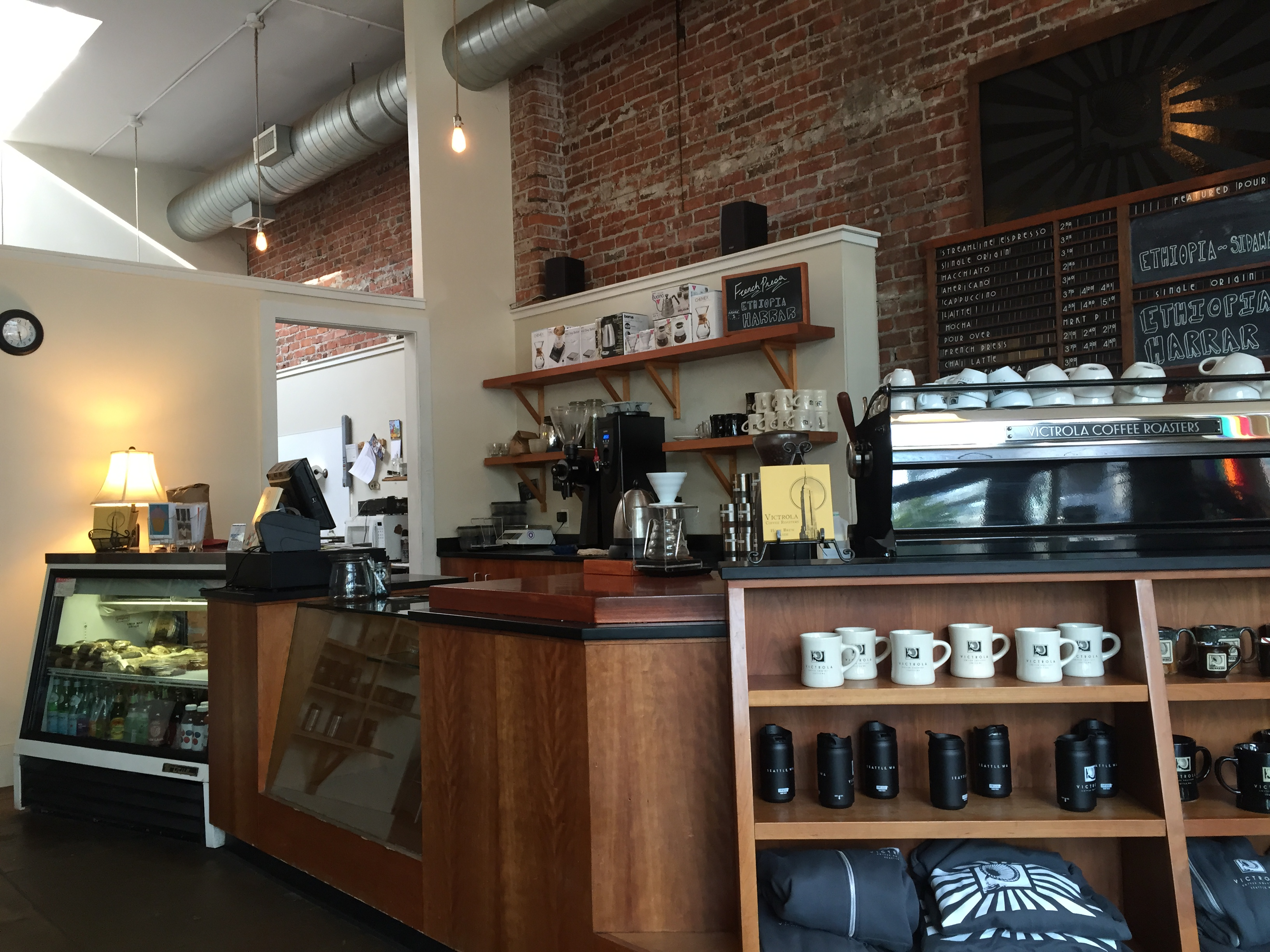
The interior of the Victrola Roastery and Cafe, Capitol Hill

Established in 2000, Victrola has locations in Seattle's Capitol Hill and Beacon Hill neighborhoods. The company's flagship location on Pike Street, sometimes called Victrola Cafe and Roastery, functions as a cafe, roastery, training facility, and coffee cupping room. Fodor's says, "Victrola is one of the most loved of Capitol Hill's many coffeehouses, and it's easy to see why: the sizable space is lovely—the walls are hung with artwork by local painters and photographers—the coffee and pastries are fantastic, the baristas are skillful, and everyone, from soccer moms to indie rockers, is made to feel like this neighborhood spot exists just for them."

In 2022, Victrola's parent company Vibe Coffee Group announced plans to acquire Seattle Coffee Works.

== Reception ==
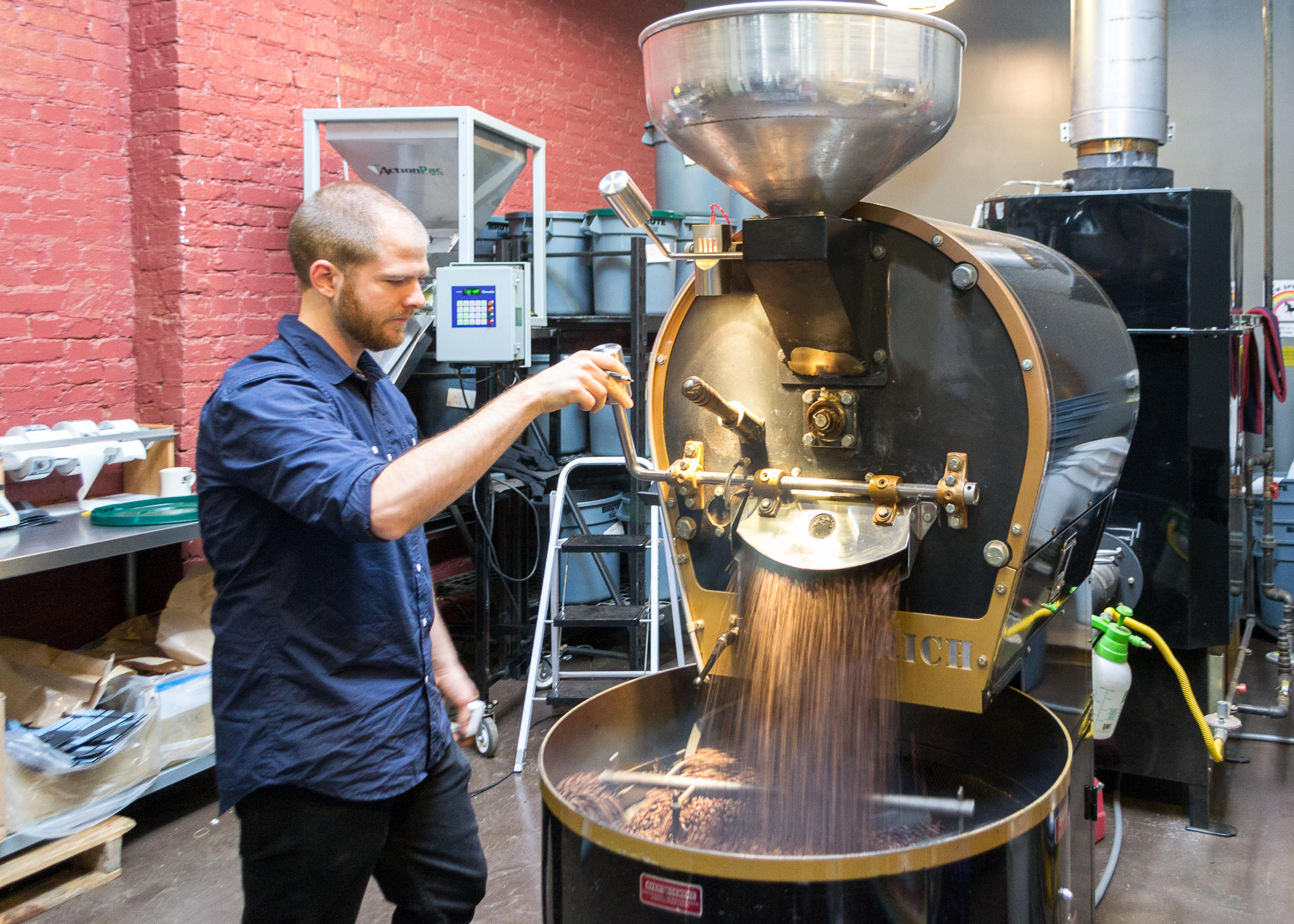
Coffee beans being dumped and cooled, 2013

Victrola has been included in Epicurious's overview of the 25 best coffee shops in the U.S. The website said, "There's no better place to immerse yourself in that past and present than with a visit to one of Victrola's three outposts. A slew of coffee folks got their start here, and their café/roaster in a 1920s auto row building still offers free public cuppings of their single-origin coffees, a friendly, no-pressure introduction to tasting that takes you through the company's bean selection and roasting process." Amber Ambrose included the East Pike Street cafe on Eater's 2014 list of "The 38 Essential Coffee Shops Across America". Mark Van Streefkerk included Victrola in Eater Seattle's 2021 overview of "Where to Get Some of the Best Coffee in Seattle". In 2021, Jordan Michelman of Eater Portland said "Victrola’s 15th Avenue baristas were among the city's first to consider themselves culinary craftspeople, setting the stage for coffee's rise to respectability as a component part of the early 21st century 'foodie' moment."
