= Lake Union Park =

Park in Seattle, Washington, U.S.

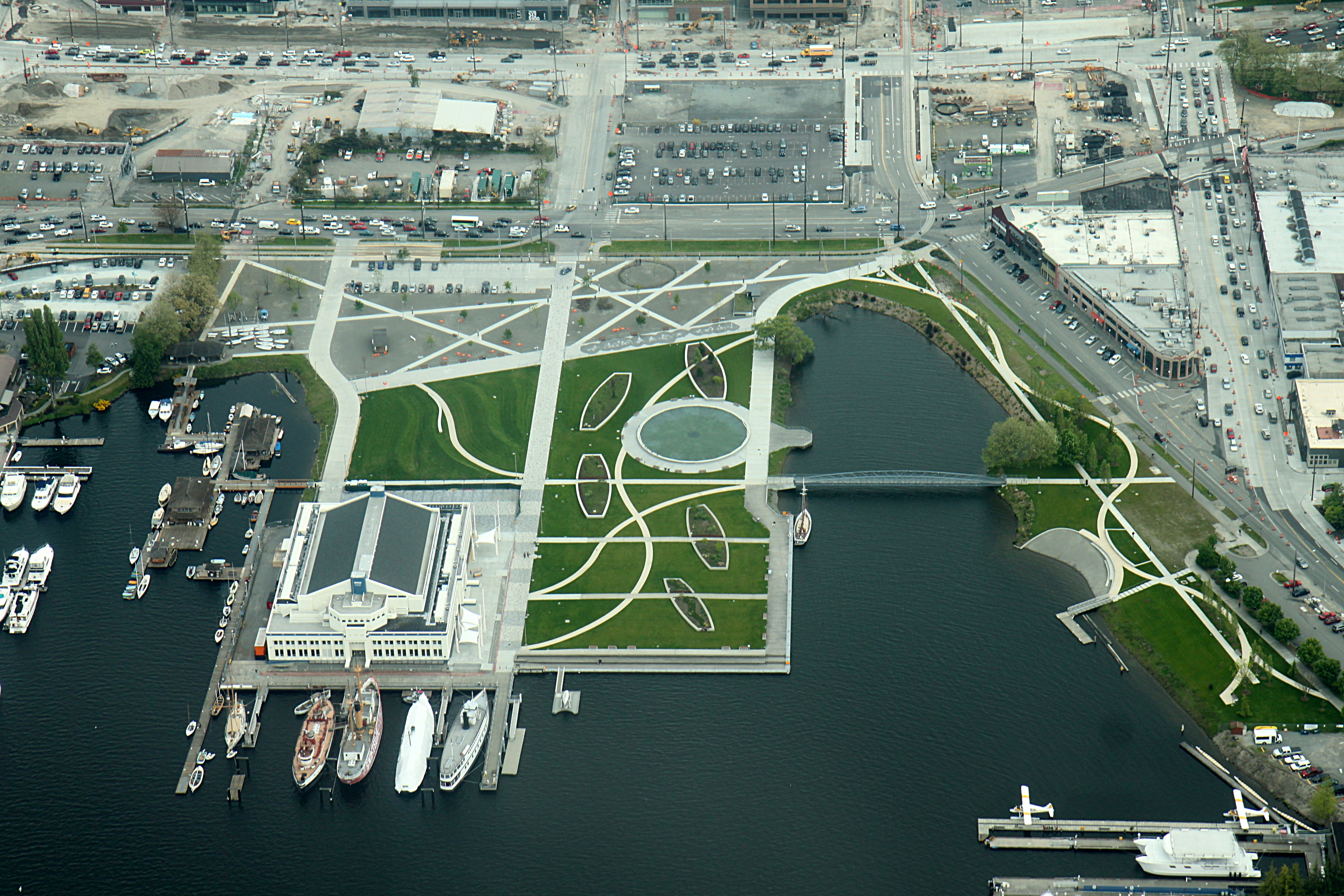
- Lake Union Park and the Armory
- Interactive map of Lake Union Park
- Location: South Lake Union, Seattle, USA
- Coordinates: 47°37′37.8″N 122°20′13.6″W
- Area: 12 acres (4.9 ha)
- Created: 2010
- Operator: Seattle Parks and Recreation
- Status: Open

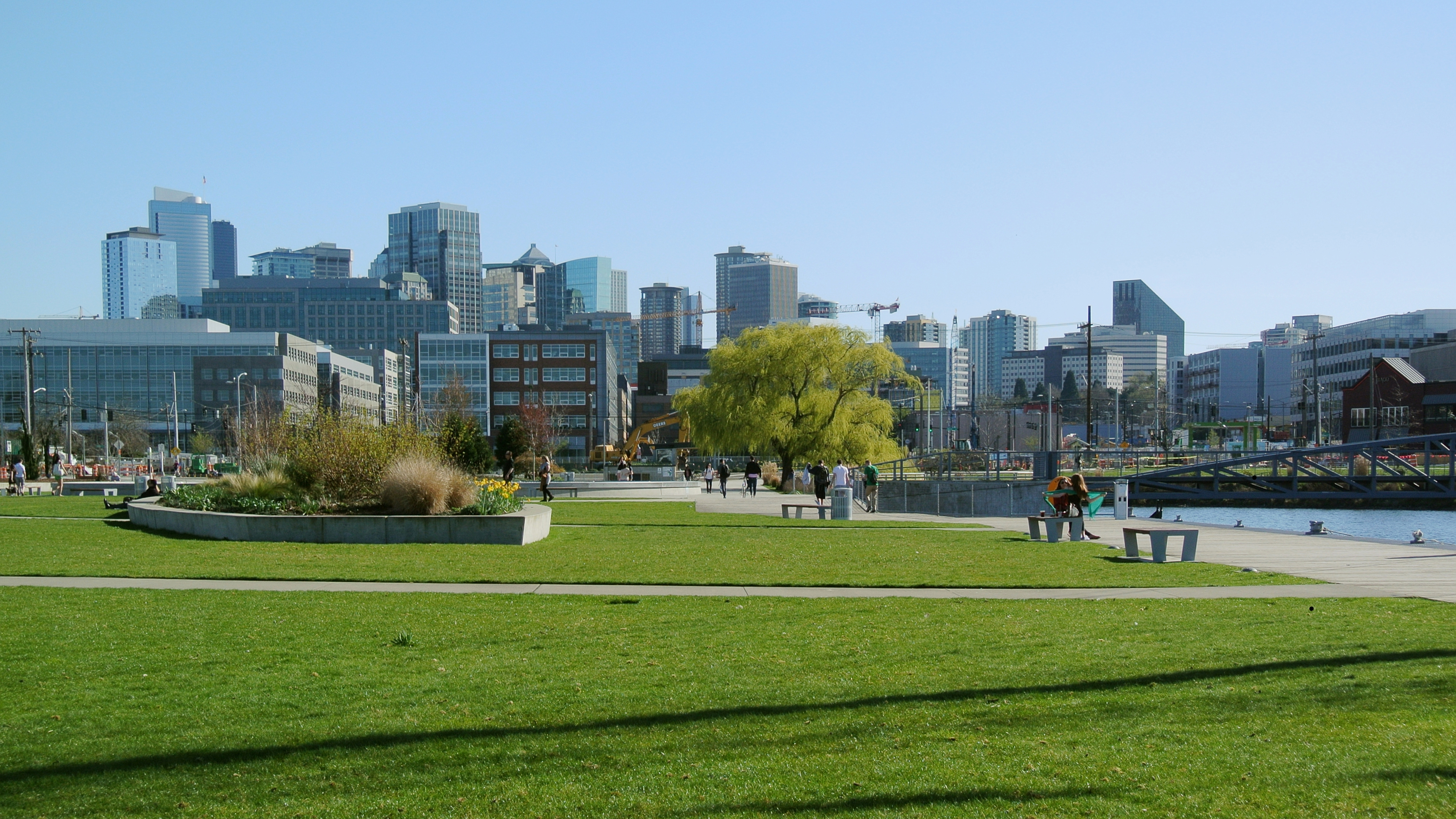
South Lake Union and downtown Seattle as seen from South Lake Union park.

Lake Union Park is a 12-acre (4.9 ha) park located at the south end of Lake Union in Seattle, Washington in the South Lake Union neighborhood. The park is owned by the City of Seattle and operated by Seattle Parks and Recreation. The park property was gradually acquired by the City, and the final 5 acres (2.0 ha) were transferred from the United States Navy to the City of Seattle on July 1, 2000. After renovation, the current park space officially opened on September 25, 2010.

== History ==
While the property was acquired by the City for the purpose of providing public park space, it was underutilized for a prolonged period due to a lack of attractive park features. Seattle Parks Foundation attempted to address that issue by conducting a campaign to raise the funds needed to substantially improve the park's facilities. The capital campaign goal was $20 million. In addition, the Seattle City Council appropriated $4.228 million in funds to repair the property's bulkhead and $5 million went to the project from the voter-approved 2000 Pro Parks Levy.

== Facilities ==
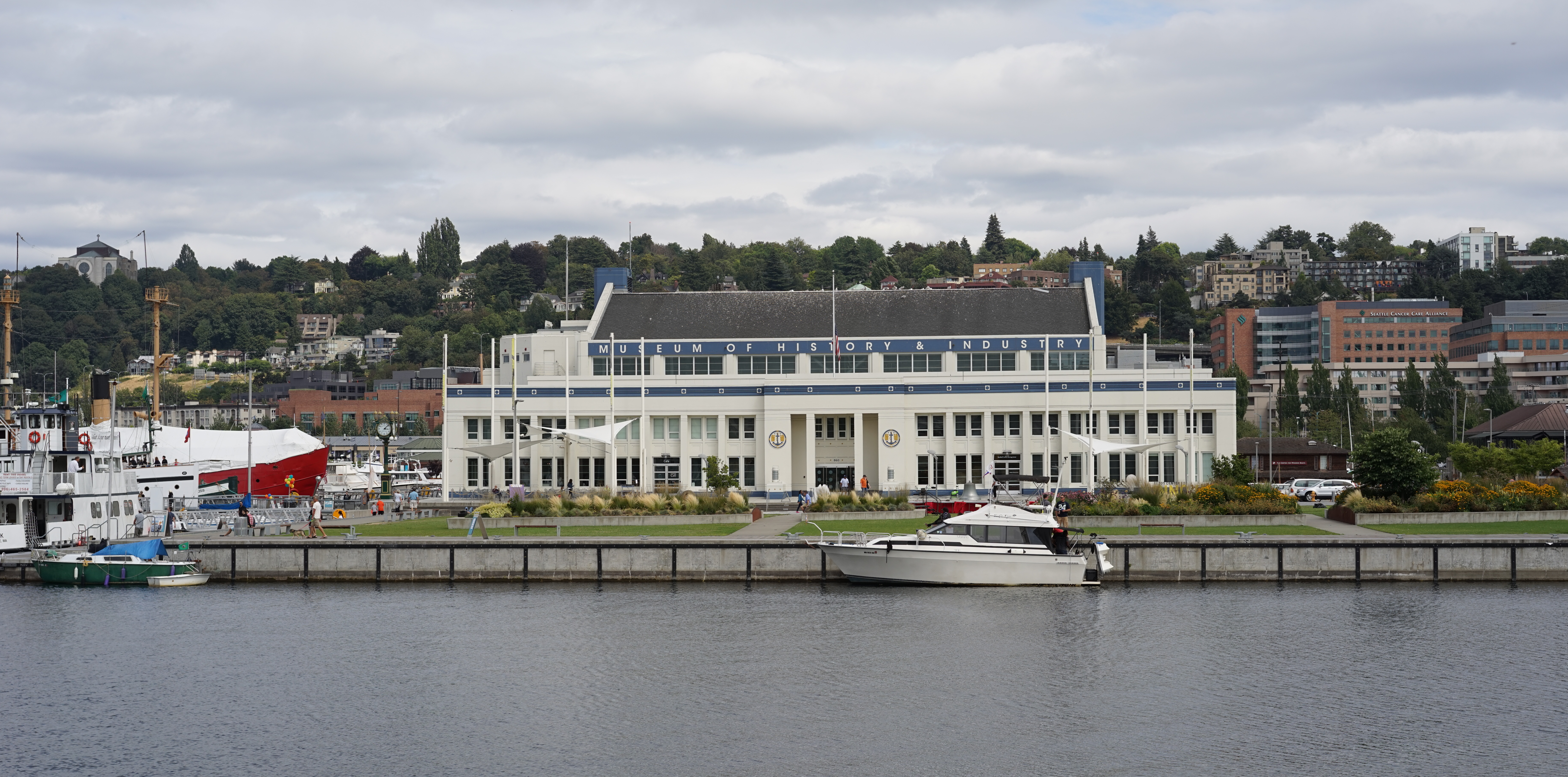
The Museum of History and Industry is situated on the park.

The park design is optimized to provide access to water and green space, connect the surrounding neighborhoods, and celebrate the cultural, industrial, and maritime heritage of the city and region. Lake Union Park includes restored shoreline, a pedestrian bridge, a model boat pond, a history trail, a fountain of water jets, a beach for launching boats, a footprint for The Center for Wooden Boats' new Education Center (future facility), a grove of trees, a Great Lawn, footpaths, park benches, and infrastructure that can support large events. Lake Union Park also has a station for the South Lake Union Streetcar, which began operating in late 2007.

The park includes a Historic Ships Wharf housing several historic vessels, including the tug Arthur Foss, the fireboat Duwamish, the lightship Swiftsure, and the steamer Virginia V. Several other large historic vessels visit the wharf, including the Hawaiian Chieftain and the Lady Washington, which was featured in movies such as Pirates of the Caribbean.

The property has several buildings, the largest of which is the former Naval Reserve building, colloquially called the Armory. In 2012, the Armory was fully restored and reopened as the new home of MOHAI, Seattle's Museum of History & Industry.

Office space in the Armory was occupied by Seattle Parks and Recreation and several nonprofit groups, including the Center for Wooden Boats, the Virginia V, Seattle Parks Foundation, and Associated Recreation Council until early 2011, at which point renovations began to make it the new site of the Museum of History and Industry (MOHAI). The new MOHAI was scheduled to open on December 29, 2012.

== Expansion ==
Seattle voters rejected a 1995 levy that would have funded development and construction of the Seattle Commons, a greenspace from Lake Union to downtown Seattle. Supporters included Mayor Norm Rice and Paul Allen who later developed real estate in the area instead.
