= List of bridges in Seattle =

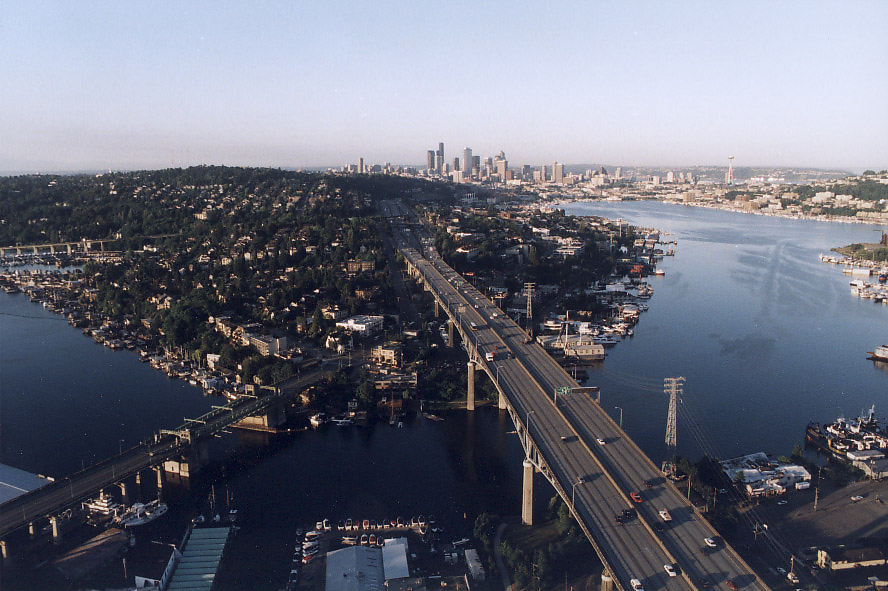
Bridges crossing over waterways towards downtown Seattle

The city of Seattle, Washington, United States, has multiple bridges that are significant due to their function, historical status, or engineering. Bridges are needed to cross the city's waterways and hilly topography. Twelve bridges have been granted historical status by the city, federal government, or both. Seattle also has some of the only permanent floating pontoon bridges in the world.

Original crossings over Seattle's mudflats were typically supported by timber piles. Lake Washington and Puget Sound are to the east and west of the city, respectively. They connect via a series of canals and Lake Union that are collectively known as the Lake Washington Ship Canal. The four double-leaf bascule bridges crossing the Ship Canal are the oldest still used in the city, having opened between 1917 and 1930. The easternmost—the Montlake and University bridges—connect neighborhoods south of the canal to the University District. The Fremont Bridge crosses the center of the canal and is one of the most often raised drawbridges in the world due to its clearance over the water of only 30 feet (9.1 m). The westernmost crossing of the ship canal is the Ballard Bridge.

Floating bridges carry Interstate 90 and State Route 520 across Lake Washington to the Eastside suburbs. The SR 520 Albert D. Rosellini Evergreen Point Floating Bridge, which opened in 2016 as the replacement for another floating bridge at the same site, is the longest floating bridge in the world. The Lacey V. Murrow Memorial Bridge had previously been replaced after the original span sunk in 1990 when water filled an open maintenance hatch during refurbishing. Age and the 2001 Nisqually earthquake have damaged the several other spans. The risk of future earthquakes has increased the need to replace already deteriorated bridges in the city, such as the Alaskan Way Viaduct (removal began in January 2019 and was completed in November of the same year) and the Magnolia Bridge.

West Seattle is on a peninsula separated from downtown by the Duwamish River. The West Seattle Bridge is the primary roadway crossing the river. The neighborhood's Spokane Street Bridge is the world's first and only hydraulically operated concrete double-leaf swing bridge.

== List of bridges ==
Key: Year opened
*: Listed in the National Register of Historic Places
†: Listed as a city landmark

| Name (Alternative names in parentheses) | Image | Year opened | Type | Length | Spans | Carries | Coordinates |
|---|---|---|---|---|---|---|---|
| Arboretum Sewer Trestle | Reinforces concrete piers and arches supporting a walkway | c.1913*† | Arch | 180 ft (55 m) | Lake Washington Boulevard E | Sewer and a footpath | 47.63952°N 122.29724°W |
| Ballard Bridge (15th Avenue Bridge) | An aging concrete and steel bridge crossing calm waters on a sunny day | 1917* | Bascule | 2,854 ft (870 m) | Salmon Bay | 15th Avenue W/15th Avenue NW | 47.65980°N 122.37622°W |
| Cowen Park Bridge | An art deco styled concrete bridge over a wooded ravine | 1936*† | Arch | 358 ft (109 m) | A ravine in Cowen Park | 15th Avenue NE | 47.67338°N 122.31178°W |
| First Avenue South Bridge | A bridge crossing a river in an industrial area | 1956 (Note: A parallel span was built in 1996; the approaches to the original span were partially demolished and the structure was retrofitted between 1996 and 1998.) | Bascule | 300 ft (91 m) | Duwamish River | State Route 99 | 47.54231°N 122.33443°W |
| Fremont Bridge (Fremont Avenue Bridge) | A low and blue colored bridge spanning crossing a canal | 1917*† (Note: The city rebuilt the approaches at each end of the bridge between 2006 and 2007.) | Bascule | 242 ft (74 m) | Fremont Cut | Road connecting Fremont Avenue N and 4th Avenue N | 47.64750°N 122.34967°W |
| George Washington Memorial Bridge (Aurora Bridge) | A high steel bridge | 1932*† | Cantilever and truss | 2,945 ft (898 m) | Lake Union | Aurora Avenue N (State Route 99) | 47.57112°N 122.35366°W |
| Homer M. Hadley Memorial Bridge (Third Lake Washington Bridge) | An interstate highway crossing a lake on a floating bridge | 1989 | Floating pontoon | 5,811 ft (1,771 m) | Lake Washington | Interstate 90, Link 2 Line | 47.58984°N 122.26942°W |
| Jeanette Williams Memorial Bridge (West Seattle Bridge) | An arching concrete bridge near a port | 1984 | Cantilever | 2,607 ft (705 m) | Duwamish River | Road connecting Fauntleroy Way SW and the Spokane Street Viaduct | 47.57094°N 122.35033°W |
| Jose Rizal Bridge (12th Avenue South Bridge) | A steel bridge over a roadway | 1911* | Truss arch | 420 ft (130 m) | S Dearborn Street and Interstate 90 | 12th Avenue S | 47.59584°N 122.31728°W |
| Lacey V. Murrow Memorial Bridge | al=The support structures of a bridge before it continues to a section floating on water | 1993 (Note: All but the approaches replace the original bridge, which opened in 1940 and sank in 1990.) | Floating pontoon | 6,620 ft (2,020 m) | Lake Washington | Interstate 90 | 47.58988°N 122.27031°W |
| Magnolia Bridge | A bridge spanning between residential neighborhoods through an industrial district | 1930 | Truss | 3,600 ft (1097 m) | Filled-in tidelands of Smith Cove | W Garfield Street | 47.63344°N 122.38255°W |
| Montlake Bridge (Eastlake Bridge) | A bridge with Collegiate Gothic style towers over a canal at sunset | 1925*† | Bascule | 344 ft (105 m) | Lake Washington Ship Canal | Montlake Boulevard E/Montlake Boulevard NE (State Route 513) | 47.6473°N 122.30468°W |
| North Queen Anne Drive Bridge | A steel bridge surrounded by trees | 1936† | Arch | 238 ft (73 m) | Wolf Creek | Queen Anne Drive | 47.64206°N 122.35238°W |
| Salmon Bay Bridge | A bridge supported by trusses with a section of it raised | 1914† | Bascule and truss | 200 ft (61 m) | Salmon Bay | BNSF Railway | 47.66680°N 122.40213°W |
| Ship Canal Bridge | A steel bridge with two decks crossing high above a body of water | 1962 | Truss | 4,429 ft (1,350 m) | Portage Bay | Interstate 5 | 47.65309°N 122.32252°W |
| Schmitz Park Bridge | The bridge name ("Schmitz Park Bridge") and year ("1936") completed engraved on in concrete | 1936*† | Rigid frame | 175 ft (53 m) | A ravine in Schmitz Park | SW Admiral Way | 47.57731°N 122.40310°W |
| Spokane Street Bridge | A concrete portion of a bridge being swung over water | 1991 | Swing | 480 ft (150 m) | Duwamish River | SW Spokane Street | 47.57138°N 122.35336°W |
| SR 520 Albert D. Rosellini Evergreen Point Floating Bridge (Evergreen Point Floating Bridge, 520 Bridge) | A long floating bridge crossing a lake in a suburban area | 2016 | Floating pontoon | 7,708 ft (2,350 m) | Lake Washington | State Route 520 | 47.64051°N 122.26019°W |
| 20th Avenue NE Bridge (Ravenna Park Bridge) | A steel bridge arching over a ravine | 1913*† | Arch | 354 ft (108 m) | A ravine in Ravenna Park | 20th Avenue NE (pedestrian/bicycle access only) | 47.67189°N 122.30632°W |
| University Bridge | A concrete and steel bridge crossing over a body of water | 1919* (Note: Remodeled and dedicated in 1933.) | Bascule | 218 ft (66 m) | Portage Bay | Eastlake Avenue E/Eastlake Avenue NE | 47.65309°N 122.32010°W |
| South Park Bridge | A concrete and steel bridge crossing over a body of water | 2014 | Bascule | | Duwamish River | 14th/16th Avenue South | 47.5293°N 122.314°W |
| John Lewis Memorial Bridge | The John Lewis Memorial Bridge, as seen from Northgate station's platform | 2021 | Truss | 1,900 ft (579 m) | Interstate 5 | Pedestrian and bike traffic | 47.7013099°N 122.3295918°W |
| 8th Ave NW Bridge | | 1950 | Truss | Unknown; roughly ~190 ft (58 m) | 8th Ave NW | General purpose lanes | 47.726579°N 122.366341°W |

=== Demolished or defunct bridges ===
| Name (Alternative names in parentheses) | Image | Year opened | Year closed | Type | Length | Spanned | Carried | Replacement | Coordinates |
|---|---|---|---|---|---|---|---|---|---|
| Alaskan Way Viaduct | The Alaskan Way Viaduct | 1953 | 2019 | Viaduct | 11,088 ft (3,380 m) | Alaskan Way | State Route 99 | SR 99 Tunnel | 47.6040°N 122.3382°W |
| Fairview Avenue North Bridge | | 1948 (west) 1963 (east) | 2019 | Timber-pile bridge | | mudflats in Lake Union | Fairview Avenue N | Fairview Avenue N | 47.6312°N 122.3278°W |
| Fremont Bridge (c. 1891) | | 1890 | 1911 | Trestle | | Fremont Cut | Road connecting Fremont Avenue N and 4th Avenue N | Fremont Bridge (1911) | 47.6475°N 122.3497°W |
| Fremont Bridge (1911) | | 1911 | 1914 | Trestle | | Fremont Cut | Road connecting Fremont Avenue N and 4th Avenue N | Fremont Bridge | 47.6475°N 122.3497°W |
| Governor Albert D. Rosellini Bridge—Evergreen Point (Evergreen Point Floating Bridge, 520 Bridge) | A long floating bridge crossing a lake in a suburban area | 1963 | 2016 | Floating pontoon | 7,578 ft (2,310 m) | Lake Washington | State Route 520 | Evergreen Point Floating Bridge (2016) | 47.6405°N 122.2609°W |
| Grant Street Bridge | Grant Street Bridge | 1886 | c. 1910 | Timber-pile bridge | 2,640 ft (805 m) or 5,280 ft (1,609 m) | Duwamish River and Elliott Bay mudflats | Primary thoroughfare from S Jackson Street to South Seattle | Seattle Boulevard (later Airport Way S) | |
| Grant Street Electric Railway Bridge | Grant Street Electric Railway Bridge | before 1891 | ? | Wooden truss bridge | | Duwamish River | Grant Street Electric Railway | South Park Bridge | 47.3146°N 122.1851°W |
| Latona Bridge | Latona Bridge | 1891 (Note: Carried the first streetcar line across Lake Union, but converted to pedestrian, horse, and vehicle traffic when a parallel span was built for streetcars in 1901.) | 1919 | Primarily cantilevered timber | 100 ft (30 m) | Narrow point of north west Lake Union | Seattle Electric Company (original) General traffic (after completion of second span) | University Bridge | 47.6525°N 122.3421°W |
| Post Avenue Bridge | | 1890 | 2017 (Note: Paved with creosoted wood blocks in 1911 before being completely asphalted over in 1945.) | Timber-pile bridge | 240 ft (73 m) | Elliott Bay waterfront | Post Avenue | Post Avenue | 47.6032°N 122.3362°W |
| South Park Bridge | | 1931 | 2010 | Bascule | 1,285 ft (392 m) | Duwamish River | 14th/16th Avenue S | New South Park Bridge | 47.5293°N 122.314°W |
| Stone Way Bridge | Stone Way Bridge | 1911 | 1918 | Trestle | 2,700 ft (823 m) | Lake Union | Stone Way | Fremont Bridge | 47.6463°N 122.3437°W |
| West Wheeler Street Bridge | West Wheeler Street Bridge | before 1914 | 1924 | Trestle | | mudflats in Interbay | W Wheeler Street, and Lawton Way (now W Armory Way) on a diagonal | Magnolia Bridge | 47.6408°N 122.3813°W |
| West Seattle Bridge c. 1900 | | c. 1900 | c. 1911 | "swinging gate" | | Duwamish River | (unnamed, future route of Spokane Street); water main | West Seattle Bridge c. 1911 | |
| West Seattle Bridge c. 1911 (Spokane Street Bridge) | Old Spokane Street Bridge. Water pipes visible on either side. | c. 1911 | c. 1918 | Swing bridge | | Duwamish West Waterway | Spokane Street; water main | West Seattle Bridge c. 1918 | |
| West Seattle Bridge c. 1918 (Spokane Street Bridge) | Spokane Street Bridge | c. 1918 | 1924 | Swing bridge | | Duwamish West Waterway | Spokane Street | West Seattle Bridge (1924) | |
| West Spokane Street Bridge (1924) (Bridge No. 1; North Bridge; westbound traffic after 1930) | | 1924 | 1978 | Bascule | | Duwamish West Waterway | Spokane Street | West Seattle Bridge (1984) and Spokane Street Bridge | |
| West Spokane Street Bridge (1930) (Bridge No. 2; South Bridge; eastbound traffic) | | 1930 | 1989 | Bascule | | Duwamish West Waterway | Spokane Street | West Seattle Bridge (1984) and Spokane Street Bridge | |

== See also ==
- List of bridges on the National Register of Historic Places in Washington (state)
- List of Seattle landmarks
- South Park Bridge, just outside the city limits
- East Channel Bridge, connects the Interstate 90 bridges with the Eastside suburbs via Mercer Island
- Tacoma Narrows Bridge, a pair of suspension bridges in nearby Tacoma
- Wilburton Trestle, a historic wooden railway trestle in nearby Bellevue
