= Alaskan Way Viaduct =

Former elevated highway in Seattle, Washington

Alaskan Way Viaduct
- A map of downtown Seattle with the Alaskan Way Viaduct highlighted in red and older demolished sections highlighted in pink

Route information
- Maintained by WSDOT
- Length: 2.2 mi (3.5 km)
- Existed: April 4, 1953–January 11, 2019
- Component highways: SR 99

Major junctions
- South end: SR 99 (Marginal Way) in Industrial District
- North end: SR 99 (Battery Street Tunnel) in Belltown

Location
- Country: United States
- State: Washington
- Counties: King

Highway system
- State highways in Washington; Interstate; US; State; Scenic; Pre-1964; 1964 renumbering; Former

The Alaskan Way Viaduct ("the viaduct" for short) was an elevated freeway in Seattle, Washington, United States, that carried a section of State Route 99 (SR 99). The double-decked freeway ran north–south along the city's waterfront for 2.2 miles (3.5 km), east of Alaskan Way and Elliott Bay, and traveled between the West Seattle Freeway in SoDo and the Battery Street Tunnel in Belltown.

The viaduct was built in three phases from 1949 through 1959, with the first section opening on April 4, 1953. It was the smaller of the two major north–south traffic corridors through Seattle (the other being Interstate 5), carrying up to 91,000 vehicles per day in 2016. The viaduct ran above Alaskan Way, a surface street, from S. Nevada Street in the south to the entrance of Belltown's Battery Street Tunnel in the north, following previously existing railroad lines.

The viaduct had long been viewed as a barrier between downtown and the city's waterfront, with proposals to replace it as early as the 1960s. Questions of the structure's seismic vulnerability were raised after several earthquakes damaged similar freeways in other cities, including some with the same design as the viaduct. During the 2001 Nisqually earthquake, the Alaskan Way Viaduct suffered minor damage but later inspections found it to be vulnerable to total collapse in the event of another major earthquake, necessitating its replacement or reinforcement.

The state and city governments considered several options, including a rebuilt elevated structure, a surface boulevard, and cut-and-cover tunnel, but could not compromise on a final choice. A deep-bored tunnel was selected in 2009 and the southern section of the viaduct was demolished in 2011 and replaced with a six-lane, single-deck freeway that travels through the SoDo industrial area. Excavation of the downtown bored tunnel by the tunnel boring machine "Bertha" began in 2013 and was completed in 2017 after two years of delays. The viaduct was closed permanently on January 11, 2019, and the new tunnel opened three weeks later on February 4. Demolition of the main viaduct deck began weeks later, and was completed in early 2020 with remaining demolition occurring at the southern approach ramp through 2020 as part of the Waterfront Seattle project.

== Route description ==
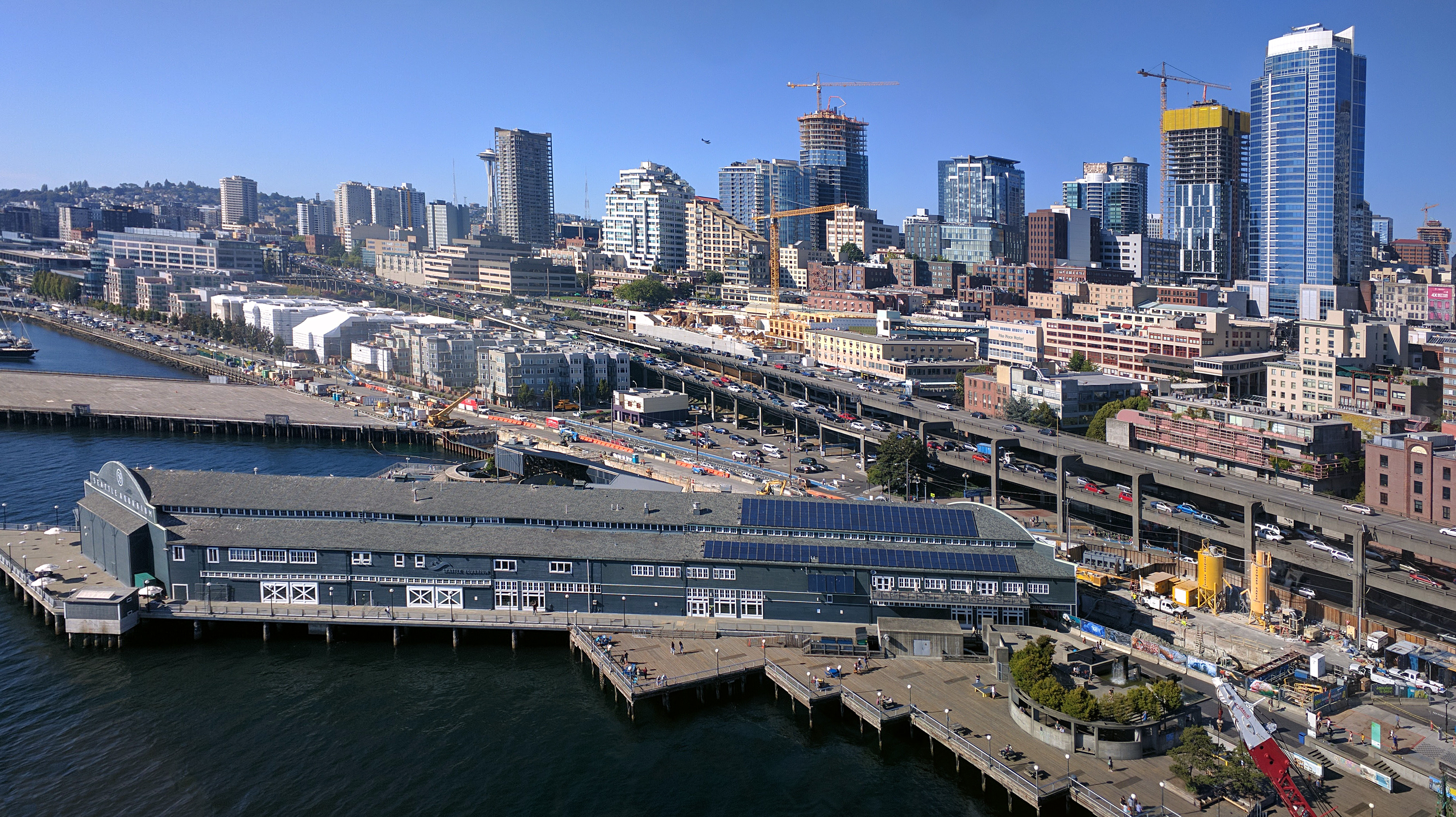
Clear panoramic view of much of the Alaskan Way Viaduct from Seattle's Great Wheel, with the Seattle Aquarium on Pier 59 in the foreground, in 2016

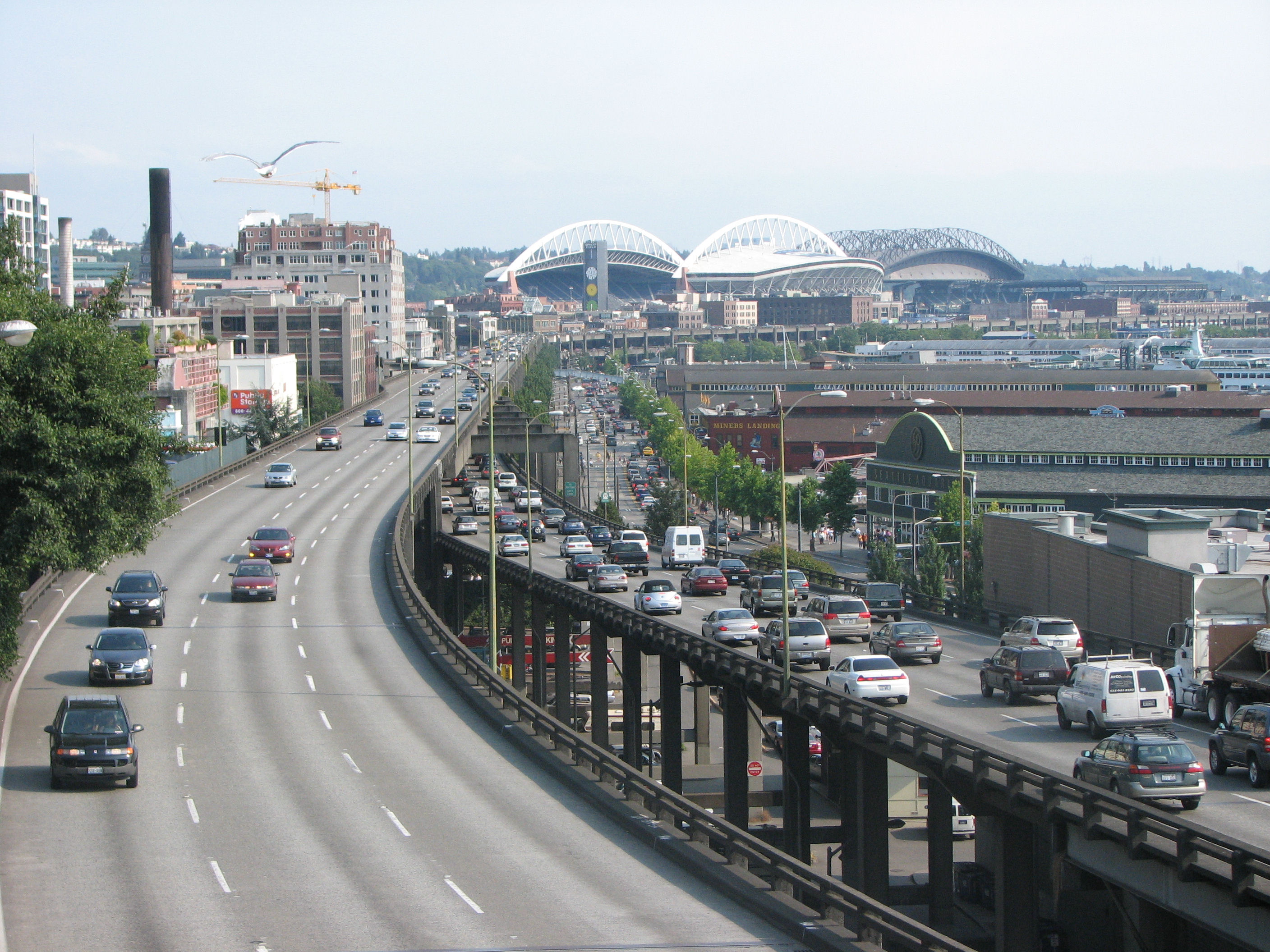
The Alaskan Way Viaduct, looking southeast from Victor Steinbrueck Park

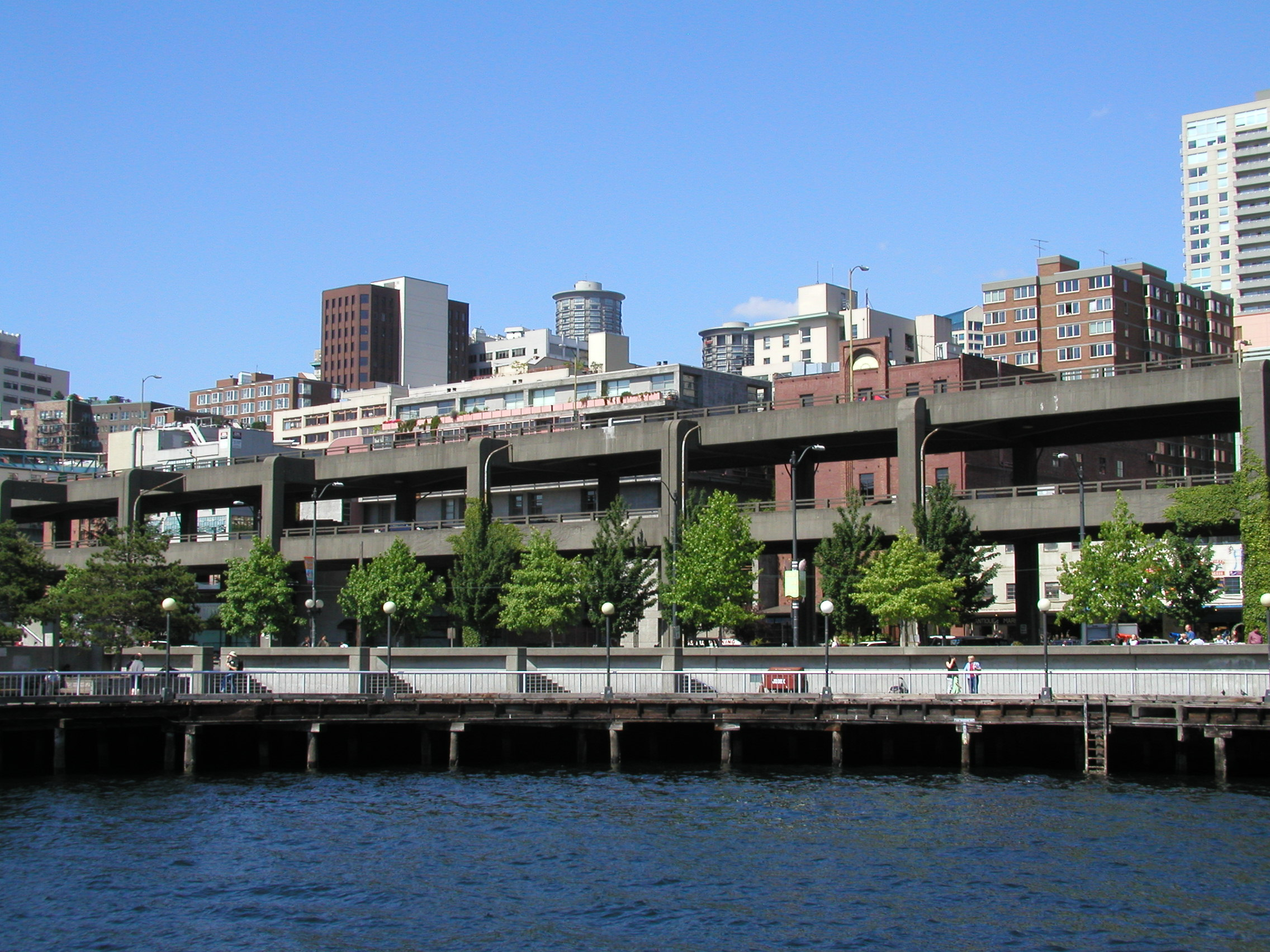
The Alaskan Way Viaduct seen from Elliott Bay

The Alaskan Way Viaduct was a double-decker freeway that traveled through Downtown Seattle and SoDo along the western waterfront facing Elliott Bay. The two highway decks each carried two to four lanes measuring as narrow as 9 feet 6 inches (2.90 m) wide, with northbound traffic on the upper deck and southbound traffic using the lower deck with a vertical clearance of 14 feet (4.3 m). The viaduct was 60 feet (18 m) tall, had 3-foot (0.91 m) concrete railings, and was supported by 400 columns spaced approximately every 51 feet (16 m).

SR 99 formerly transitioned from a surface freeway to the double-decker elevated viaduct near South Holgate Street in SoDo, approximately 3 miles (4.8 km) north of the First Avenue South Bridge and beyond an interchange with the West Seattle Freeway near Harbor Island. The freeway then ran between the Port of Seattle's Terminal 46 and the Seattle Coast Guard Station to the west and the BNSF Railway container yard to the east. It passed a set of ghost ramps near Safeco Field that were originally planned to accommodate a freeway connection to Interstate 90 that was never built. Near CenturyLink Field, SR 99 reached the terminus of the original (and post-2011) viaduct and the south portal of the future downtown bored tunnel, using a set of diagonal ramps parallel to Railroad Way to reach the central section of the viaduct.

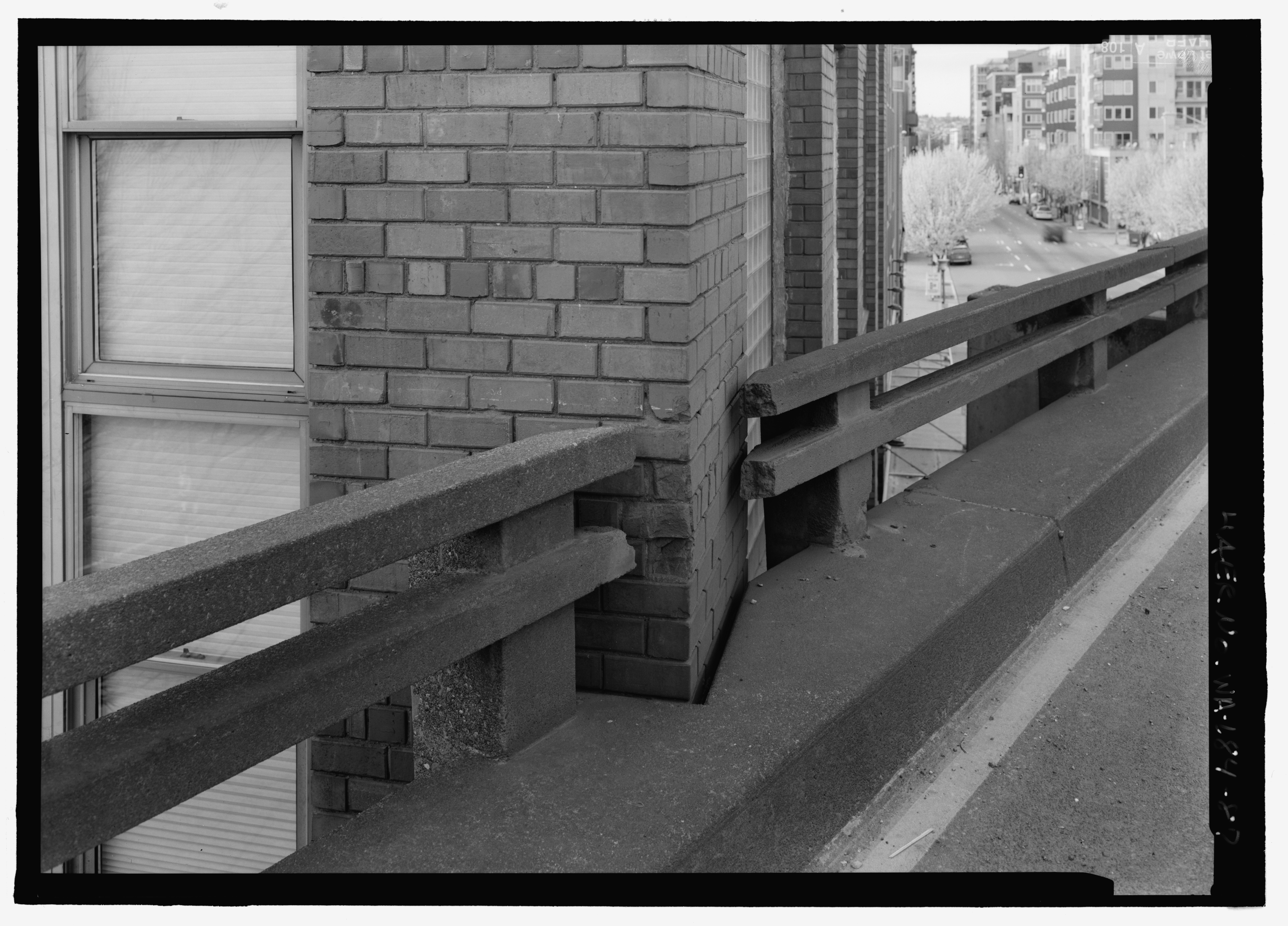
A notch in the viaduct's railing at the Seattle Empire Laundry Building on Western Avenue

The viaduct expanded from four lanes to six lanes and turned northwest as it followed Alaskan Way and the city's waterfront on the west side of Pioneer Square; the area underneath the viaduct was used for street parking between construction periods. It passed east of the state ferry terminal at Colman Dock and reached a set of ramps serving downtown traffic: the Columbia Street onramp to the southbound lanes and the Seneca Street offramp from the northbound lanes. The waterfront section of the viaduct was noted for its scenic views, which include Elliott Bay, the distant Olympic Mountains, and the city's skyline. Between the Seattle Aquarium and Pike Place Market, the double-decker viaduct ended as SR 99 split into a pair of side-by-side elevated lanes that traveled over the north portal of the Great Northern railroad tunnel and under Victor Steinbrueck Park. SR 99 then came to an interchange with Elliott and Western avenues, which marked the north end of the viaduct and the south end of the four-lane Battery Street Tunnel. The Western Avenue crossing included a notch in the southbound railing of the viaduct, which was cut out to pass around a column of the Seattle Empire Laundry Building.

The Alaskan Way Viaduct was one of two north–south freeways traversing Downtown Seattle, the other being Interstate 5 to the east. Traffic volumes on the viaduct, measured by WSDOT in terms of average annual daily traffic in 2015, averaged approximately 91,000 vehicles south of Columbia Street and 71,000 vehicles between Columbia Street and Western Avenue. The viaduct formerly carried an average daily volume of 110,000 vehicles until the start of demolition in 2011. The viaduct and other sections of SR 99 were designated as part of the National Highway System by the federal government and as Highway of Statewide Significance by the state legislature.

== History ==
Video of a northbound drive on the viaduct in January 2019, just prior to its closure

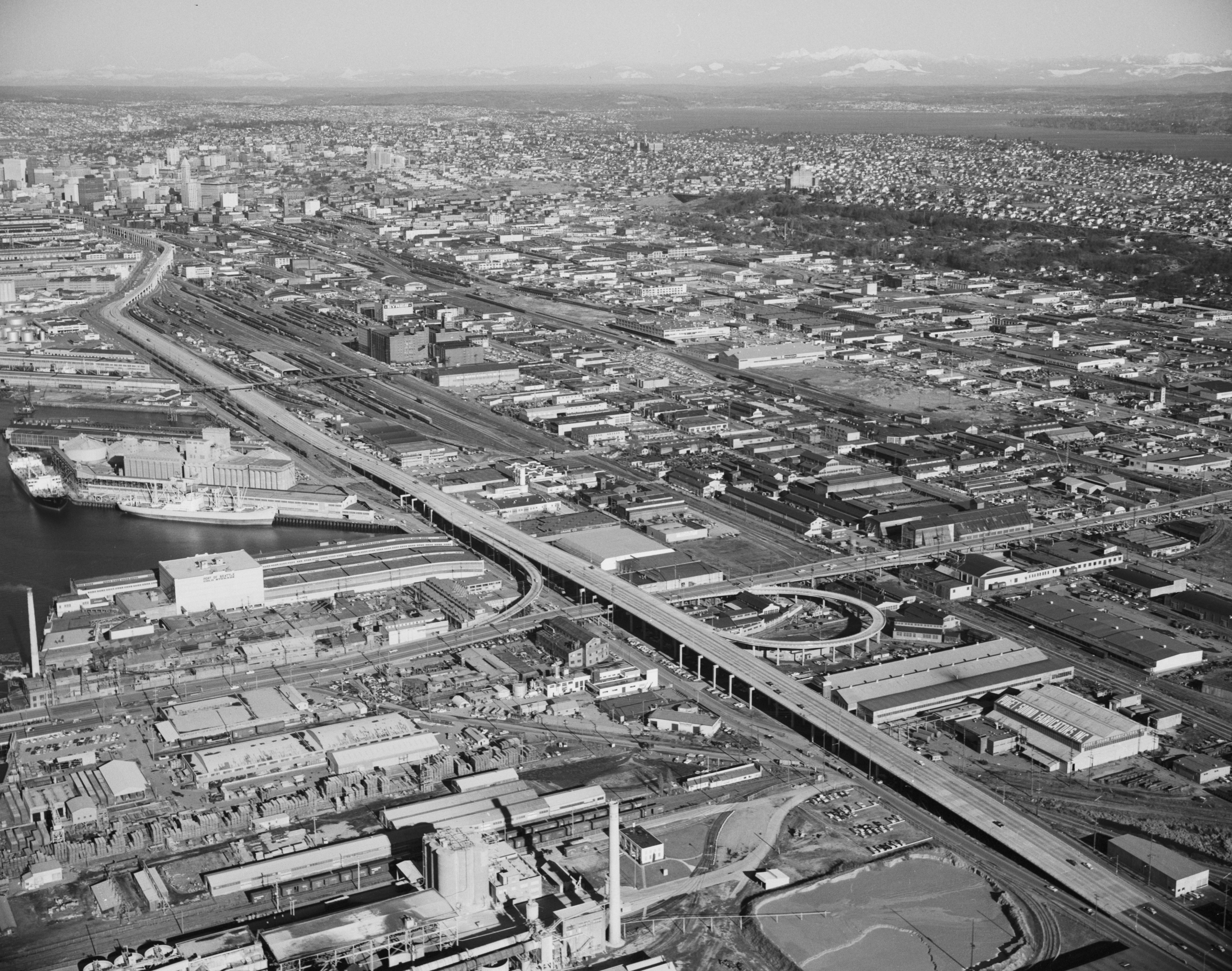
Aerial view of the Alaskan Way Viaduct and its southern extension in 1960

The Alaskan Way Viaduct was originally built to carry a section of U.S. Route 99, the main north–south highway in Washington and along the U.S. West Coast. The highway previously used downtown streets, but rising automobile congestion in the 1920s sparked proposals for a limited-access bypass of Seattle. An elevated roadway, placed along the waterfront's Railroad Avenue (later renamed Alaskan Way), was recommended by several city engineers in the latter part of the decade. Plans for an elevated highway gained public support in the late 1930s and was approved for construction in 1947 using funds from the Federal-Aid Highway Act of 1944.

Construction on the viaduct began in February 1950 and was completed in stages between 1953 and 1959. The central portion, from Railroad Way to Elliott Avenue, opened on April 4, 1953. It was connected to the Battery Street Tunnel the following year and a series of offramps and onramps to downtown in the 1960s. Additional ramps to University and Spring streets were included in design plans, but never built. The southern section of the viaduct, linking to the Spokane Street Bridge, was opened in September 1959.

The viaduct officially closed on January 11, 2019, attracting spectators and drivers who caused it to miss the 10 p.m. deadline. Demolition of the northbound ramp on Railroad Way began the following day in preparation for the excavation of pre-constructed ramps into the new tunnel. Demolition was completed in stages between February and November 2019, using a section-by-section approach to avoid major disruptions. The last section to remain standing was near Pike Place Market.

== Replacement project ==
=== Earthquake concerns ===
The 1989 Loma Prieta earthquake destroyed the similarly designed Cypress Street Viaduct in Oakland, California, with the loss of 42 lives. The 2001 Nisqually earthquake damaged the viaduct and its supporting Alaskan Way Seawall and required the Washington State Department of Transportation (WSDOT) to invest US$14.5 million in emergency repairs. Experts gave a 1-in-20 chance that the viaduct could be shut down by an earthquake within the next decade. Semi-annual inspections discovered continuing settlement damage from the Nisqually earthquake up until the viaduct was removed in 2019.

In 2001, the Alaskan Way Viaduct was considered for placement on the National Register of Historic Places by the Washington State Office of Archaeology and Historic Preservation for its historic qualities.

Due to damage from continuing settlement, a group of researchers and faculty from the University of Washington urged the mayor of Seattle (in 2007) to close the viaduct within a four-year timeframe.

=== Tunnel planning and construction ===
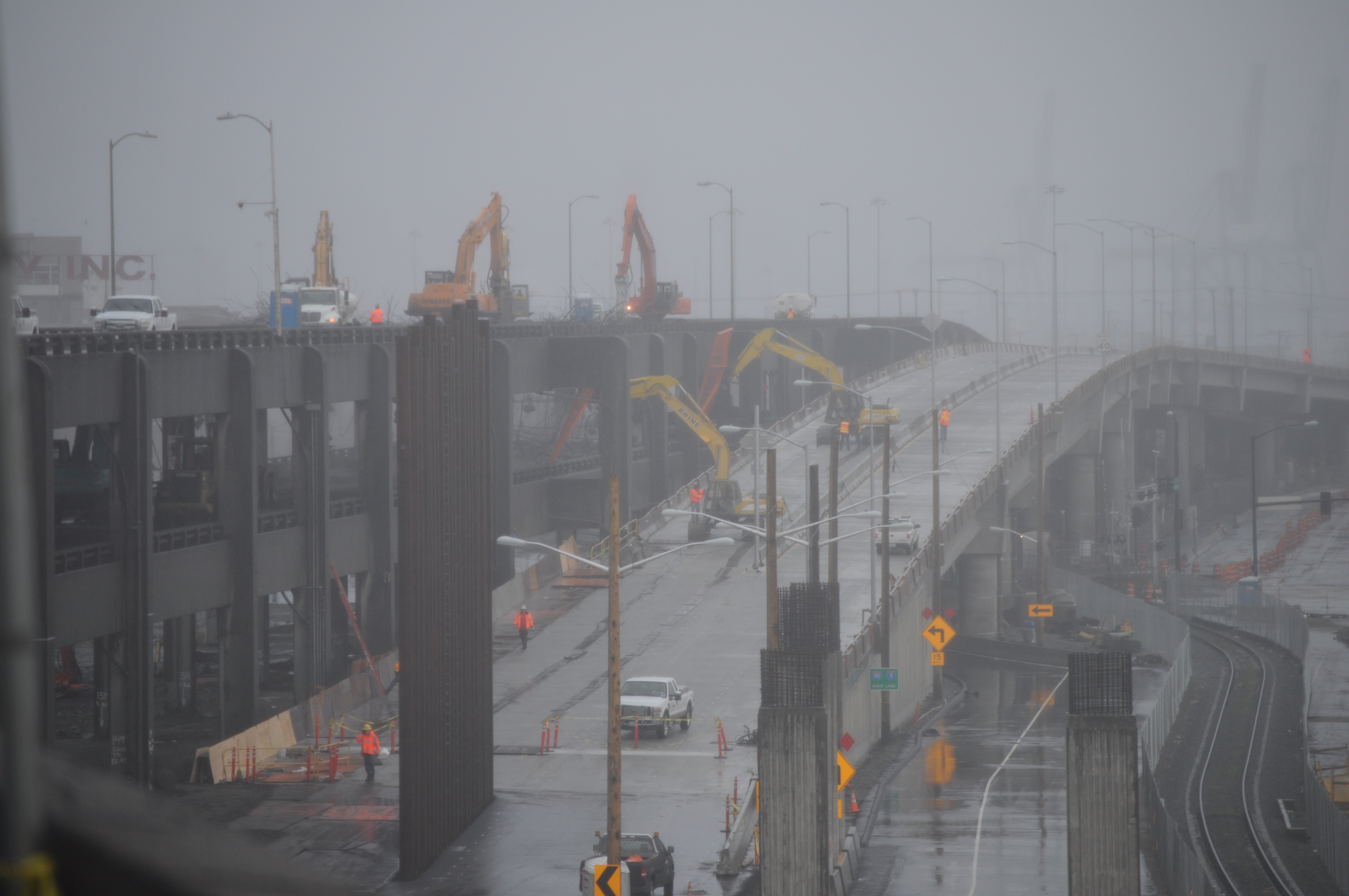
Demolition of the southernmost section of Alaskan Way Viaduct, October 2011

On January 12, 2009, the governments of Washington, King County, the city of Seattle, and the Port of Seattle announced that they had agreed to replace the viaduct with a four-lane, 2-mile (3.2 km) long tunnel. The tunnel would have a south portal in SoDo, near CenturyLink Field, and a north portal near Thomas Street, north of the Battery Street Tunnel.

The project was estimated to cost $4.25 billion, with state, city, and county promised funding well short of the estimate. The state would fund boring of the tunnels, while the city and county would fund surface street improvements and repairs to the Alaskan Way Seawall, which itself was damaged in the Nisqually earthquake. The announcement did little to quell the long and heated debate over the viaduct's replacement, with several factions expressing their criticism over the tunnel decision.

Boring of the tunnel by the tunnel boring machine "Bertha" began on July 30, 2013, with the roadway initially scheduled to open in December 2015. Tunneling stopped on December 6, 2013, after the boring machine struck a steel pipe, which obstructed its path 1,083 feet (330 m) into the route. Investigations revealed that the machine had struck a pipe which had been installed in 2002 as a part of an exploratory well used to measure groundwater as part of the planning phases for the project. Boring resumed briefly on January 28–29, 2014, stopping again due to damage to the seal system which protects the machine's main bearing and damage to several of the cutting blades. This caused a two-year delay as it was necessary to dig a 120-foot (37 m) vertical shaft recovery pit from the surface in order to access and lift the cutterhead for repair and partial replacement.

Work was initially expected to resume by March 2015, but it was December 2015 before tunnelling recommenced. Boring was halted again 23 days later after a sinkhole developed on the ground in front of the machine, but resumed a month later.

In July 2016, a citywide ballot measure attempted to build an elevated park along the waterfront after the demolition of the viaduct, utilizing a portion of the existing structure. The attempt failed, with more than 80 percent of voters in Seattle rejecting the measure. By this time, the tunnel was not expected to be completed until 2019, and had incurred $223 million in cost overruns.

=== Opening of new tunnel ===
In March 2018, construction of the replacement tunnel was expected to be completed in August 2018, with a planned opening date of October 2018. Cost overruns had reached about $600 million due to the delays in tunnel boring. WSDOT reverted to the tunnel's original opening date of early 2019 to accommodate a longer preparation period and avoid potential work delays due to winter weather. On January 11, 2019, the Alaskan Way Viaduct was permanently closed in preparation for the opening of the new tunnel, which required the excavation of several buried ramps at the south portal and other road realignments.

The viaduct was opened to pedestrian traffic on February 2, 2019, and bicycle traffic the day after, as part of a festival to celebrate the freeway's history. Over 100,000 people attended the two events, which also included tours of the new tunnel. The replacement tunnel was opened to traffic on February 4, 2019.

=== Demolition and replacement ===
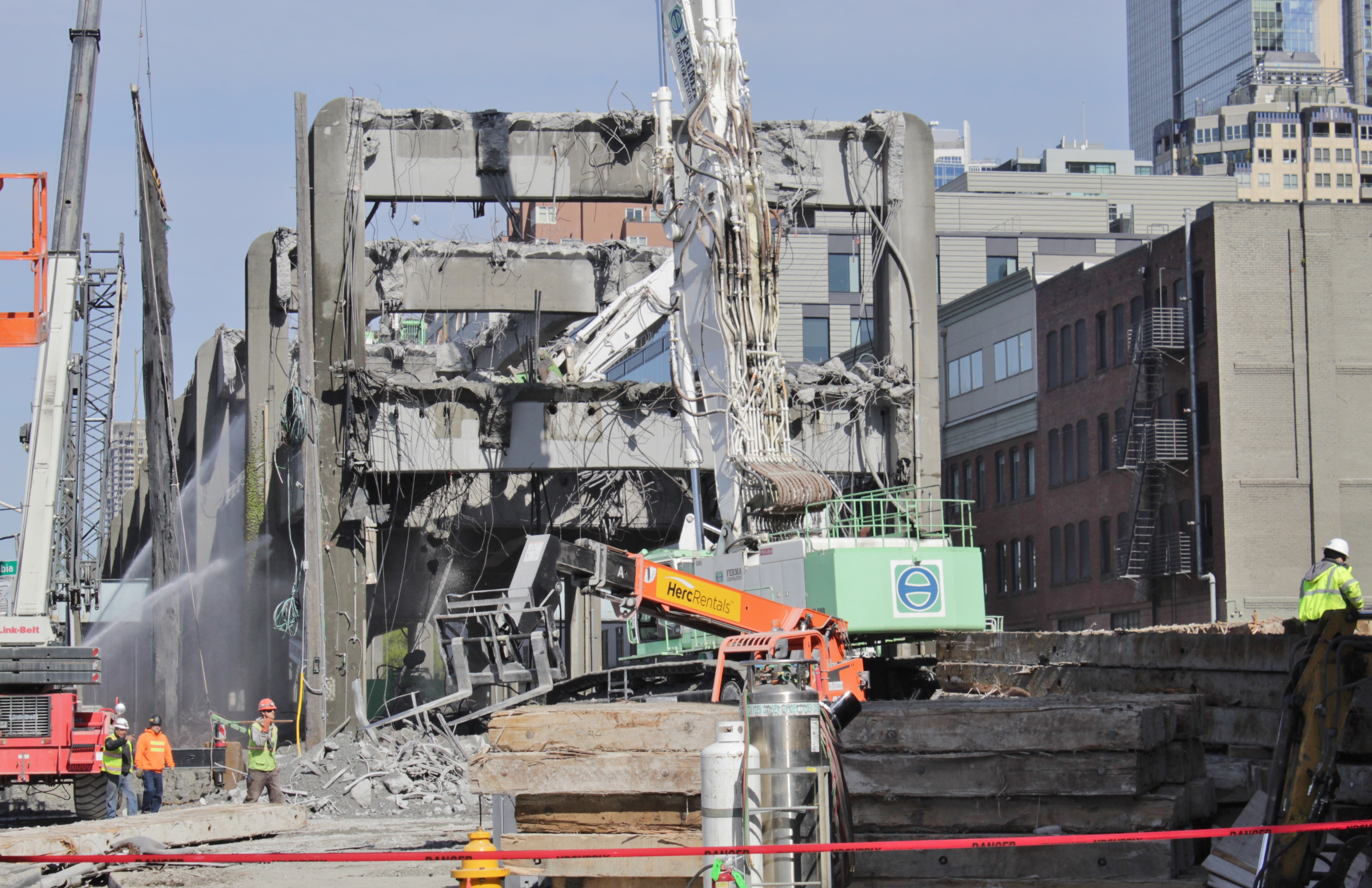
Demolition of the viaduct near Columbia Street, seen in early April 2019

Demolition of the viaduct began on February 15, 2019, after being delayed by several days due to a severe snowstorm. Contractors began with the upper deck and its columns, followed by the lower deck in a section-by-section process. It was originally scheduled to be completed by June 2019, but a compressed schedule caused by the tunnel's delayed opening caused demolition to take longer than expected and conflict with the summer tourism season. Demolition work reached the 50 percent milestone on June 11, with the Pioneer Square and Pike Place Market sections left for the final stages. The final double-deck section of the viaduct, including the Marion Street pedestrian bridge at Colman Dock, was demolished in late September 2019. The final section of the viaduct, removed in November 2019, was over the northern portal of the Great Northern Tunnel near the Pike Place Market.

Demolition work was completed on November 21, 2019, with 240 million pounds (110,000,000 kg) of concrete recycled and 15 million pounds (6,800,000 kg) of steel rebar reclaimed. Some of the concrete from the demolition was pulverized and used to fill the Battery Street Tunnel. New development along the waterfront in downtown Seattle, including a park promenade, was planned to be completed by 2021. The full program is scheduled to be completed in 2025 due to delays attributed to the COVID-19 pandemic and a concrete workers' strike.

== Exit list ==
The entire route was in Seattle, King County. All exits were unnumbered.

Location	mi	km	Destinations	Notes
Industrial District	22.65	36.45	SR 99 south (Marginal Way)	Continuation south
Industrial District	22.65	36.45	Spokane Street – West Seattle	Northbound exit and southbound entrance
Industrial District	22.74	36.60	West Seattle Bridge – Harbor Island	Southbound exit and northbound entrance
Industrial District	24.24	39.01	SR 519 south (South Atlantic Street) to I-90 / I-5	Southbound exit and northbound entrance
Pioneer Square	25.03	40.28	Columbia Street	Southbound entrance only
Downtown	25.04	40.30	Seneca Street	Northbound exit only
Belltown	25.69	41.34	Western Avenue	
Belltown	25.69	41.34	SR 99 north (Battery Street Tunnel)	Continuation north
1.000 mi = 1.609 km; 1.000 km = 0.621 mi: Incomplete access

== See also ==
- Embarcadero Freeway, a former elevated freeway along the waterfront in San Francisco that was demolished.
- Cypress Freeway, a former elevated freeway in Oakland that collapsed in 1989
- John F. Fitzgerald Expressway, a former elevated freeway in Boston (Interstate 93) that was rerouted into a 3.5-mile (5.6 km) tunnel.
- List of tunnels documented by the Historic American Engineering Record in Washington (state)
- West Side Highway, a former elevated freeway along the West Side waterfront in Manhattan that was partially replaced with an at-grade boulevard.

== Bibliography ==
- Gilmore, Susan (September 8, 2006). "Two views of the viaduct" (article links to videos which require RealPlayer 10.5). Seattle Times.
- Gilmore, Susan (August 9, 2006). "State offers 3 decidedly different designs for viaduct". Seattle Times.
- Gilmore, Susan (August 2, 2006). "Idea of fixing viaduct seen as having merit but problems as well". Seattle Times.
- Gilmore, Susan (July 25, 2006). "What will happen if viaduct closes? Study takes a look". Seattle Times.
- Lange, Larry (May 3, 2006). "A Longer shelf life for the viaduct". Seattle P.I.
- "Seattle's Little Dig". Seattle Weekly. April 19, 2006. Archived from the original on August 14, 2009.
- "MorePerfect.org collected news stories". MorePerfect.org. Archived from the original on August 14, 2009.
- "Viaduct Open to Cars Today." Viaduct Open to Cars Today [Seattle] April 5, 1953: n. pag. 1 Rpt. in The Seattle Post Intelligencer. Seattle: n.p., 1953.
- "Alaska Way VIaduct and Battery Street Tunnel HAER WA-184" (PDF). Washington State Department of Transportation. Archived from the original (PDF) on March 27, 2014.
