= West Spokane Street Bridge collision =

Coordinates: 47°34′17″N 122°21′12″W

The West Spokane Street Bridge spans after the older eastbound span was rammed by the Chavez on June 11, 1978

At 2:38 a.m. on June 11, 1978, the freighter Antonio Chavez rammed the West Spokane Street Bridge, thereby closing it to automobile traffic for the next six years. The pilot and master were both found negligent in causing the collision. The collision led to the opening of the current West Seattle Bridge in 1984. The incident occurred in the west fork of the Duwamish Waterway, as the Chavez hit the West Spokane Street Bridge which had been raised to allow the ship to pass through. This blocked eastbound traffic to West Seattle, until the westbound span was temporarily adapted to handle two-way traffic.

== Background ==
The West Spokane Street Bridge was constructed in 1924, to cross the west fork of the Duwamish Waterway and provide access to North Admiral, Alki Point, and other quickly-growing neighborhoods in West Seattle. Increasing traffic over the years had made it necessary to construct a parallel bridge in 1930. After the completion of the second bridge in 1930, the newer bridge carried eastbound traffic (away from West Seattle), and the older 1924 bridge carried westbound traffic into the neighborhood. This remained the primary connection between West Seattle and Harbor Island throughout the 1930s, 1940s, 1950s, and 1960s.

=== Forward Thrust ===
Seattle planners had worked on a higher bridge to supplement the West Spokane Street Bridge, calling their campaign "Forward Thrust", and placing bridge funding proposals on the ballot in 1968 and 1970. The Forward Thrust campaign had multiple funding sources lined up, but these funding sources backed out due to a corruption scandal. By 1975, the project was widely considered dead. Federal highway administrator Norbert Tiemann remarked, "Short of knocking it down, there is nothing else. And you certainly wouldn't want to go that route." A disaster involving the bridges would qualify Forward Thrust for federal bridge replacement funds.

== Collision ==
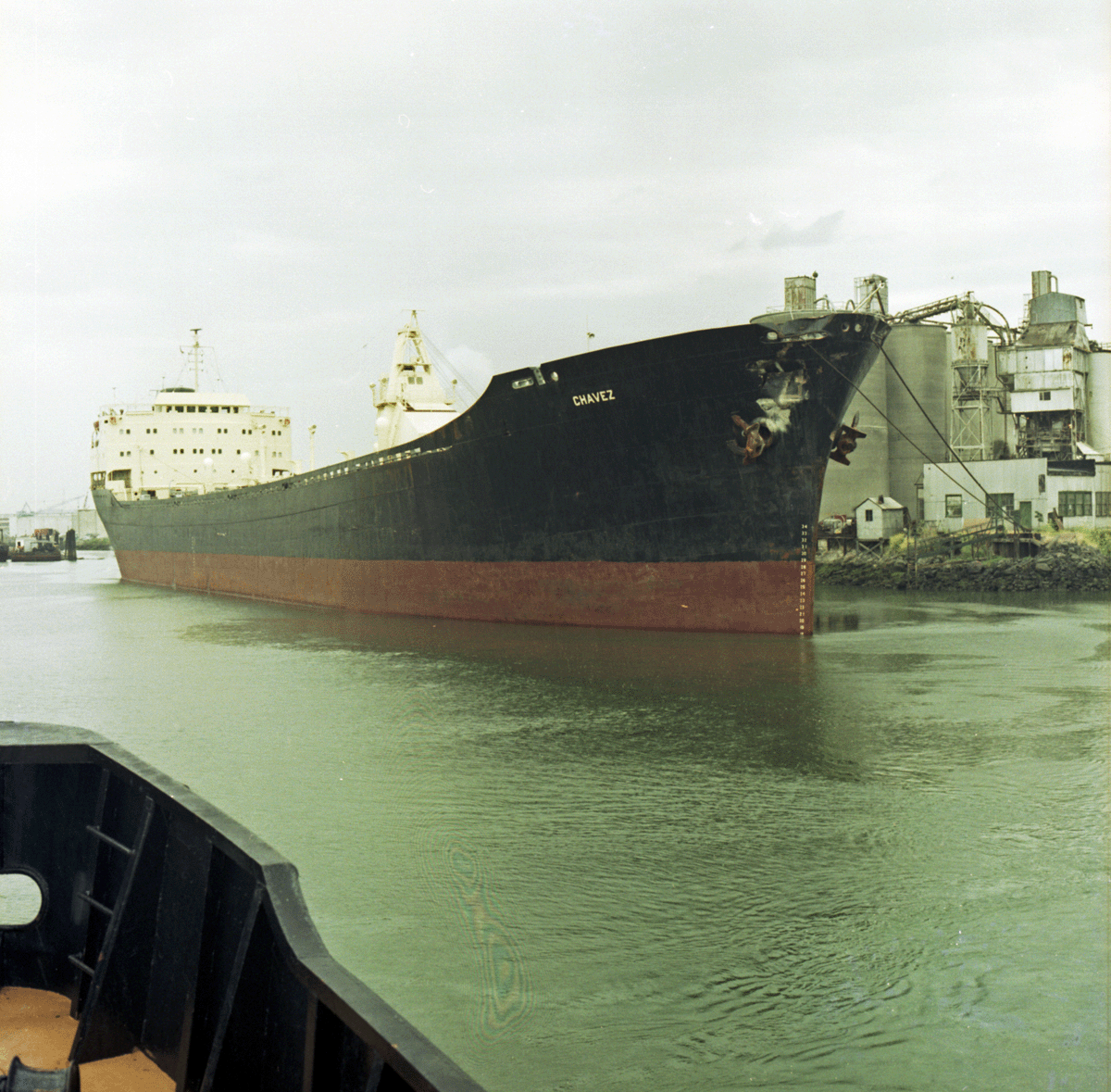
The Antonio Chavez, the ship that hit the old bridge.

On June 11, 1978, the Chavez struck the bridge. No one was hurt in the collision, but it resulted in the bridge being stuck open. The Chavez was 550 feet (170 m) long and was carrying 20,000 tons of gypsum under the command of 80-year-old Puget Sound Pilot Rolf Neslund (1897–1980) and its master, Gojko Gospodnetic, when, just before dawn, it struck the east end of the bridge. A Coast Guard board of inquiry found both officers negligent. Neslund retired two weeks after the accident. Gospodnetic, a Yugoslav national, was fired.

== Aftermath ==
=== Murder of Chavez pilot ===
The ship's pilot, Rolf Neslund, was forced into retirement because of the accident. He was likely too old to be piloting tugs, and also had a drinking problem. In 1980, after several years of a deteriorating domestic relationship characterized by alcoholism and violent conflict, Neslund disappeared. Police alleged that in an argument over pension money, Rolf's wife, Ruth Neslund, shot and killed her husband on August 8, 1980, burning his remains at their home on Lopez Island. The body was never found. However, with no sign of Rolf, Ruth was charged in 1983 for the murder and convicted after a trial in 1985. She died of natural causes at the Washington Corrections Center for Women in February 1993.

=== Funding for West Seattle Bridge ===
The accident had one positive result: It ended years of debate over a new West Seattle Bridge, particularly a high bridge to accommodate Port of Seattle plans for expanded use of the Duwamish Waterway. While the federal bridge replacement fund was not enough to fund the new bridge, Seattle politicians worked with Congress to get additional federal funding. After the accident, Mayor Charles Royer (1939-2024) and City Councilmember Jeanette Williams (1914–2008) enlisted the aid of U.S. Senator Warren G. Magnuson (1905–1989) to secure federal funds and the participation of the U.S. Army Corps of Engineers as project manager for the high-level bridge. The new span was dedicated on July 14, 1984, at a cost of $150 million including $60 million in federal money. The 1930 span was closed in 1989 (and subsequently demolished), and a new pivot-swing bridge later replaced the two bascule bridges in 1991.

== See also ==
- West Spokane Street Bridge, the 1924 low-span bridge that the Chavez smashed into (closed to traffic in 1978), and its 1930 low-span companion (closed to traffic in 1989)
- West Seattle Bridge, the high span that replaced the West Spokane Street Bridge for commuter purposes, opening in 1984
- Spokane Street Bridge, the low span that replaced the West Spokane Street Bridge for industrial purposes, opening in 1991
