= AWV =

AWV may refer to:

- Amalgamated Wireless Valve Co, part of AWA Technology Services
- Association of Writers of Vojvodina, a writing association in Vojvodina, Serbia
- Alain-Werke-Verzeichnis, a system for cataloging the works of Jehan Alain
- Alaskan Way Viaduct, an elevated road in Seattle, Washington, United States
