= West Spokane Street Bridge =

Former twin bascule bridges in Seattle, Washington, U.S. (1924–1989)

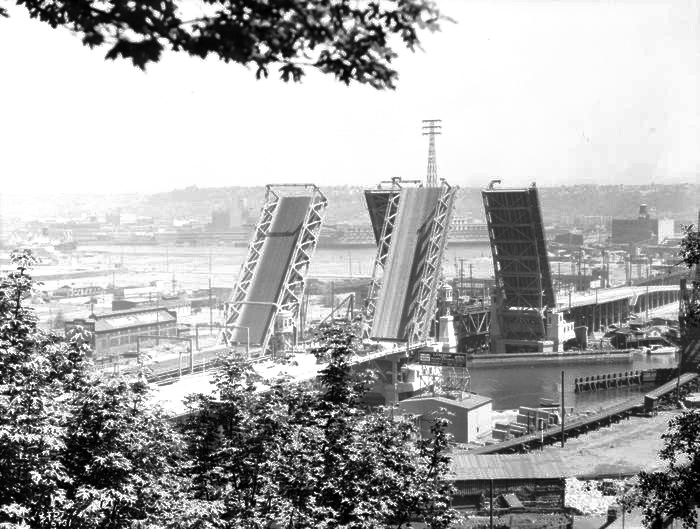
- The bridges in 1931, as seen from Pigeon Point in Delridge, West Seattle
- Coordinates: 47°34′17″N 122°21′12″W
- Carries: Spokane Street
- Crosses: Duwamish River
- Locale: Seattle, Washington, U.S.
- Other name(s): Spokane Street Bridge
- Maintained by: Seattle Engineering Department

Characteristics
- Design: Bascule bridge
- No. of spans: 2

History
- Opened: December 1924 (westbound); September 20, 1930 (eastbound)
- Closed: June 11, 1978 (westbound); May 23, 1989 (eastbound)

The West Spokane Street Bridge was a pair of bascule bridges that crossed the west fork of the Duwamish River in Seattle, Washington, United States. The bridges connected the SoDo and West Seattle neighborhoods over the river. The original bridge opened to traffic in 1924; a second bridge carrying eastbound traffic was opened in 1930, with the 1924 bridge reconfigured to carry westbound traffic.

Both bridges carried traffic until 1978, when a freighter rammed into the 1924 bridge; the 1930 bridge was subsequently reconfigured to handle two-way traffic as a result. The 1930 bridge was replaced in official capacity by the higher-level Jeanette Williams Memorial Bridge (a.k.a. the West Seattle Bridge) in 1984. The 1930 span of the bridge was closed in 1989 and subsequently demolished to make way for a lower swing bridge connecting West Seattle to Harbor Island (now known as the Spokane Street Bridge, which opened in 1991).

== Background and early years ==
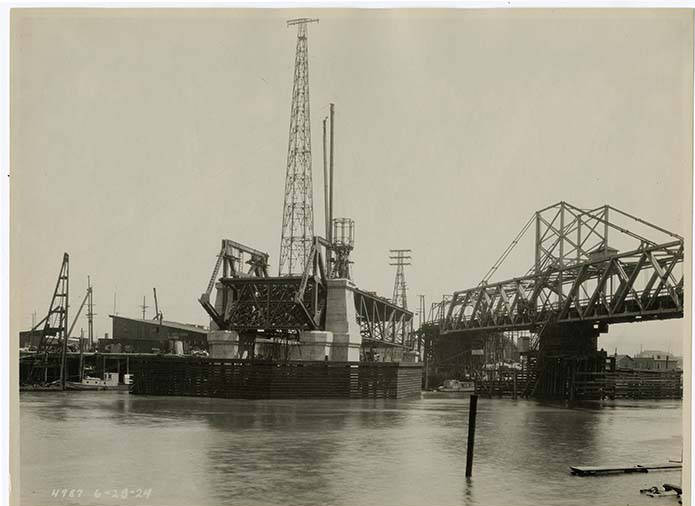
The first permanent bridge under construction in June 1924; the 1918 temporary bridge is on the right

The West Spokane Street Bridge crossed the Duwamish River from Harbor Island to West Seattle. "Spokane Street" has long been used as designation for the streets running along the latitude of the current West Seattle Bridge. Before any permanent bridge was built along the line of Spokane Street, there had been three temporary bridges, built c. 1900, c. 1910, and c. 1918. The first one was basically a swinging gate in what had been primarily built as a water main; the second was a swing bridge that also carried a water main, and the third was a swing bridge after the water main had been rerouted elsewhere.

A more permanent bascule bridge was constructed in 1924, which lasted for several decades; a second, parallel bridge was constructed south of the first in 1930. In 1945, one of Seattle's oldest freeways (the Spokane Street Viaduct) connected the bridge to Beacon Hill. Prior to the construction of Interstate 5, the viaduct was separated from the bridge by the main north-south corridor, U.S. Route 99.

== Replacement project ==
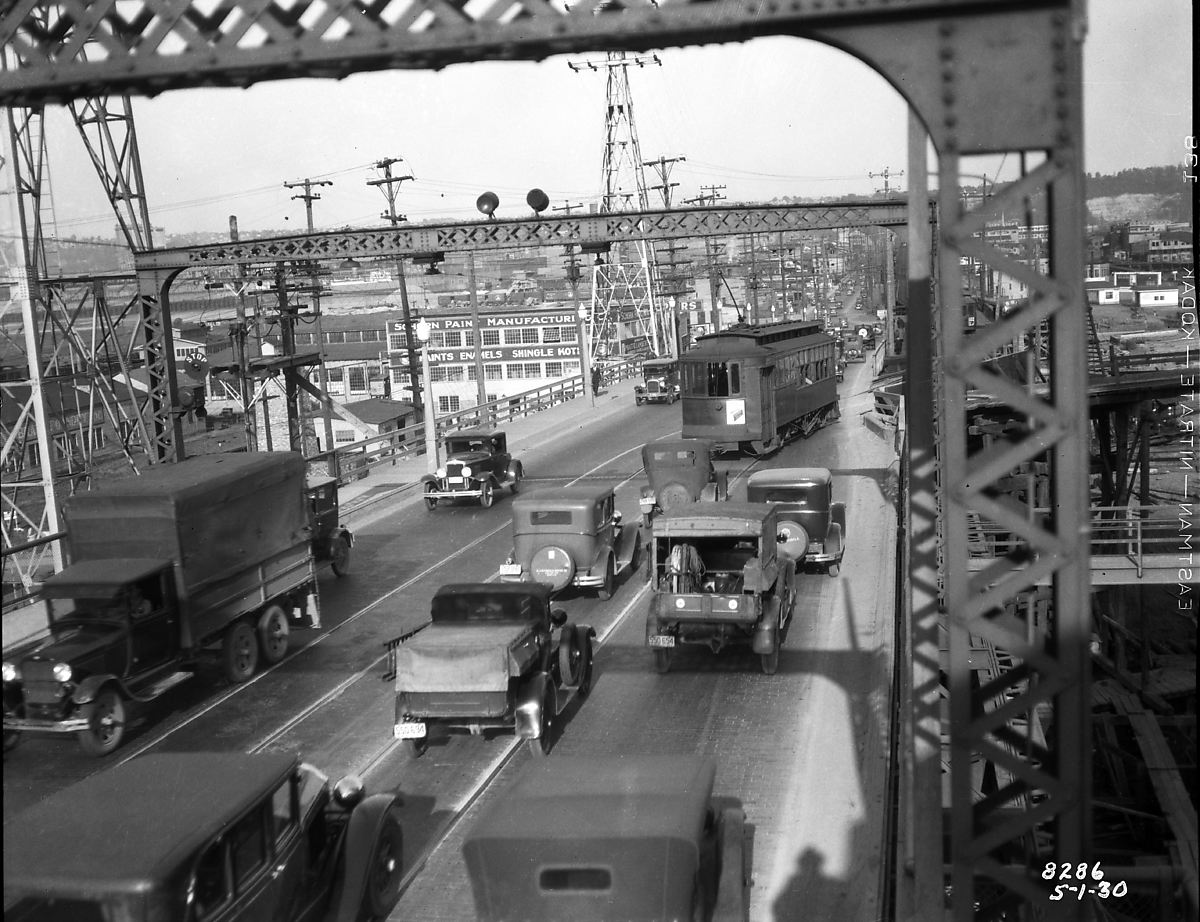
Traffic on the 1924 bridge in May 1930

By the 1970s, the West Spokane Street Bridge was one of Seattle's worst bottlenecks, due to the large number of ships in Duwamish Waterway and the frequent bridge openings. City leaders began planning a higher bridge, without a drawbridge, in the 1960s. Planning for the bridge was hampered by difficulties in receiving funding. In large part, this is because the bridge was not a designated highway. A 1968 Forward Thrust ballot measure included $16.7 million in funding for the bridge, largely to receive votes from West Seattle residents. Other funding sources included a state program for funding urban streets and money from a maintenance fund.

After a long drawn-out process, three companies eventually bid to design the bridge for $1.5 million. However, the city engineer chose a fourth company that was financially connected to the speaker of the state house. The price from this fourth company was triple the cost of the other three. This was a result of a series of bribes involving the head of the House Transportation Committee, the city engineer and others. Despite the 68 percent support in the 1968 ballot measure, the state withdrew its urban streets money due to the scandal. In 1976 and 1977, the conspirators were placed on trial and imprisoned.

After the scandal, the project was considered dead. Norbert Tiemann, a federal highway regulator, stated that there would essentially be no chance of the project receiving federal funds for completion. Tiemann also quipped, "Short of a tug knocking it down (which could trigger federal special bridge replacement funds), there is nothing else. And you certainly wouldn't want to go that route." In March 1978, several prominent West Seattle residents filed a petition to organize a secession referendum, with the hopes of finding state funding for a new bridge to serve their independent city. The secession campaign was required to gather 29,000 signatures for a ballot measure, but were unable to meet the threshold before the northern or westbound drawbridge was permanently closed and all east-west traffic was funneled over the southern span.

== 1978 collision ==
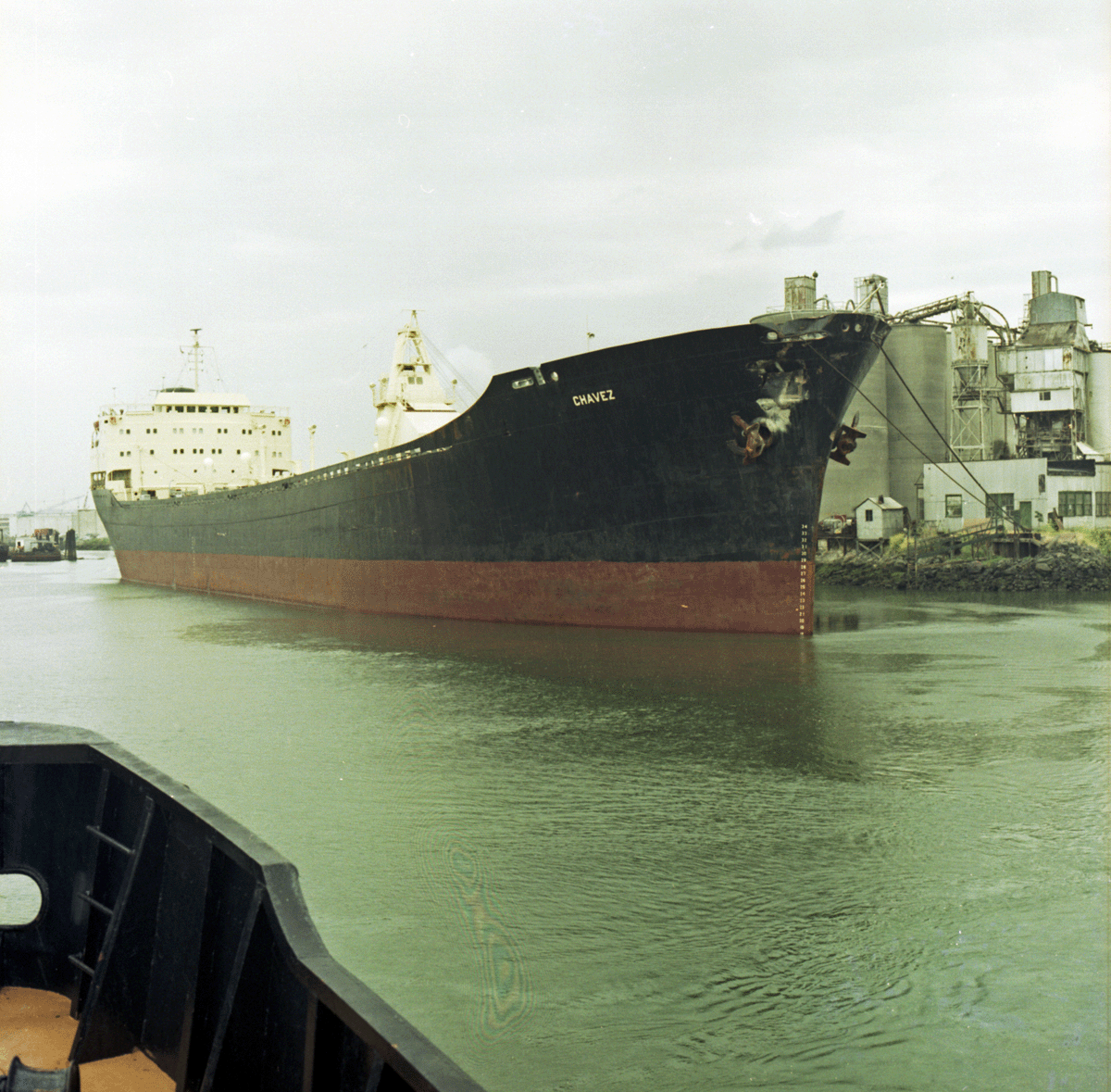
The Antonio Chavez, the ship that struck the 1924 bridge, as seen the day after the collision

At 2:38 a.m. on June 11, 1978, the freighter Chavez rammed the West Spokane Street Bridge over the Duwamish West Waterway. No one was hurt in the collision, but it resulted in irreparable damage with the bridge's spans stuck open; the bridge was permanently closed as a result. A US Coast Guard inquiry found the ship's pilot, Rolf Neslund, and master, Gojko Gospodnetic, were negligent; Gospodnetic was fired and Neslund forced into retirement. Neslund later disappeared in 1980. Although he was never found, his wife was convicted of his murder.

== Replacement bridges ==
The high span West Seattle Bridge project qualified for funds from the federal Office of Special Bridge Replacement as a result of the 1978 collision. However, with many other damaged bridges to replace, this program alone did not have sufficient funding. While federal lawmakers were opposed to appropriating funds to a high-level bridge, Seattle City Council member Jeanette Williams, who served on the council from 1970 to 1989, lobbied Congress for the bridge and successfully secured funds with help from Senator Warren Magnuson. The high span bridge was completed in 1984, though demolition of the 1924 bridge continued until January 1986. Meanwhile, the 1930 bridge continued to carry traffic (around 12,000 vehicles per day) until it was closed on May 23, 1989, and subsequently demolished to make way for construction of the similarly-named Spokane Street Bridge, a swing bridge that opened in 1991; Kiewit Corporation handled both projects. Before the West Seattle Bridge opened, many of the neighborhoods in West Seattle had low property values because of the difficulty in getting downtown.

The West Seattle Bridge was closed in March 2020 after cracks in the underside were found to be growing rapidly, necessitating a major repair amid the COVID-19 pandemic. The bridge reopened in September 2022.
