= Cheryl Chow =

American educator and politician

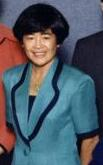
- Cheryl Chow, 1997

Member of the Seattle City Council from Position 8
- In office January 1, 1990 – January 1, 1998
- Preceded by: Jeanette Williams
- Succeeded by: Richard McIver

Personal details
- Born: Cheryl Mayre Chow; May 24, 1946 Seattle, Washington
- Died: March 29, 2013 (aged 66) Seattle, Washington
- Party: Democratic
- Spouse: Sarah Morningstar (m. March 16, 2013)
- Relations: Ruby Chow (Mother); Edward Shui "Ping" Chow (Father)
- Children: Liliana Morningstar-Chow
- Education: Western Washington University (BA)

Cheryl Chow (May 24, 1946 – March 29, 2013) was an American educator and politician. She was a Seattle City Council member from 1990 to 1997.

== Early life ==
Chow was born in Seattle, Washington, on May 24, 1946. Chow's father was Edward Shui "Ping" Chow, a Cantonese opera singer who received U.S. Citizenship after he was discharged from the United States Army, and her mother was Ruby Chow, who served as a King County Councilwoman, the first Asian American elected to that council. Her parents also owned Ruby Chow's restaurant, where Bruce Lee once worked. Chow's maternal grandparents were Chinese immigrants who had come to the United States to work on the railroad lines.

Chow graduated from Franklin High School and then attended Western Washington University.

== Career ==
After college, Chow worked as a physical education teacher at Hamilton International Middle School, a public school in the Seattle School District.

Chow also coached girls' basketball for the city parks and recreation department and became an instructor for the Seattle Chinese Community Girls Drill Team, which was started by her mother. Chow coached the drill team for almost 50 years. She coached basketball for the Seattle Chinese Athletic Association for around 30 years.

In 1975, Chow became Principal at Sharples Junior High School (now Aki Kurose Middle School Academy). Chow became assistant principal of Garfield High School in 1981, and in 1982 she served as principal of Madison Junior High.

In 1985, Chow ran for the King County Council for the seat her mother was retiring from, ultimately losing the election. Before running for Seattle City Council, she worked at the Office of the Superintendent of Public Instruction. Between 1983 and 1989 she served as the administrative supervisor for middle schools, Area Director, and Director II.

== Seattle City Council ==
In 1989, Chow ran for Seattle City Council against longtime incumbent Jeanette Williams. In the November general election Chow narrowly defeated Williams, 50% to 49%. She ran for reelection in 1993, winning in a landslide with 74% of the vote.

In her first term, Chow chaired the Parks and Public Grounds Committee, and in her second term, she chaired the Health, Housing, Human Services, Education and Libraries Committee. On the latter committee she helped create the Urban Rest Stop to provide services to unsheltered people in Downtown Seattle. During her time on council, she helped form the Families and Education Levy, which funded after school programs, and helped build five community centers in the city. Chow stated her greatest achievements was getting the late night recreation centers and pulling together Asian gang leaders. In 1996, Chow worked as interim principal at West Seattle’s Madison Middle School while on the council, which received some criticism from community members.

She decided not to run for reelection to her council seat in 1997 and instead ran for Seattle mayor. In the September primary election, Chow failed to advance past the primary.

In 1999, Chow ran for Seattle City Council in Position 1 after council member Sue Donaldson decided not to run for office. In the August primary, Chow came in second and advanced to the general election with political newcomer, Judy Nicastro coming in first. Chow outraised Nicastro by over $12,000 due to her support from landlords and business leaders. Chow and her supporters labeled Nicastro as a "radical leftist," and Nicastro and her supporters labeled Chow "mediocre."

Chow would narrowly lose the November General Election to Nicastro, 49.51% to 50.49%.

== Post-council ==
After leaving the city council, Chow became an interim Principal at her alma mater, Franklin High School, and then at Garfield High School. In 2005, Chow was elected to the Seattle School Board. Chow served on the School Board until 2009 and served as Board President during her tenure. She also worked for the Girl Scouts of Western Washington as their Director of Outreach.

== Honors ==
Chow was inducted into Franklin High School's hall of fame in 1992. She had graduated from the school and served there as principal. In 2012, the City of Seattle declared September 17 "Cheryl Chow Day", and in 2013, the Seattle Organization of Chinese Americans gave her the Golden Circle Award.

In 2015, the Low Income Housing Institute opened the Cheryl Chow Court Apartments in Ballard, offering 50 reduced-rent apartments to senior citizens, many of whom had previously been unsheltered.

In 2024, the Seattle City Council named Cheryl Chow Boulevard after Chow, placing a street sign next to Franklin High School, at South Mount Baker Boulevard and 31st Avenue South.

In 2025, the city opened Cheryl Chow Park at South Charlestown Street and 35th Avenue South in Rainier Valley.

== Personal life ==
Chow came out as a lesbian in August 2012. On March 16, 2013, less than two weeks before her death, Chow married her partner of ten years, Sarah Morningstar. Together, they have a daughter, Liliana Morningstar-Chow. Chow and Morningstar began running marathons as a hobby because the training allowed them to be together in public.

Cheryl Chow died on March 29, 2013 of central nervous system lymphoma at age 66, in Seattle.
