= Spokane Street Viaduct =

Highway connector in Seattle, US

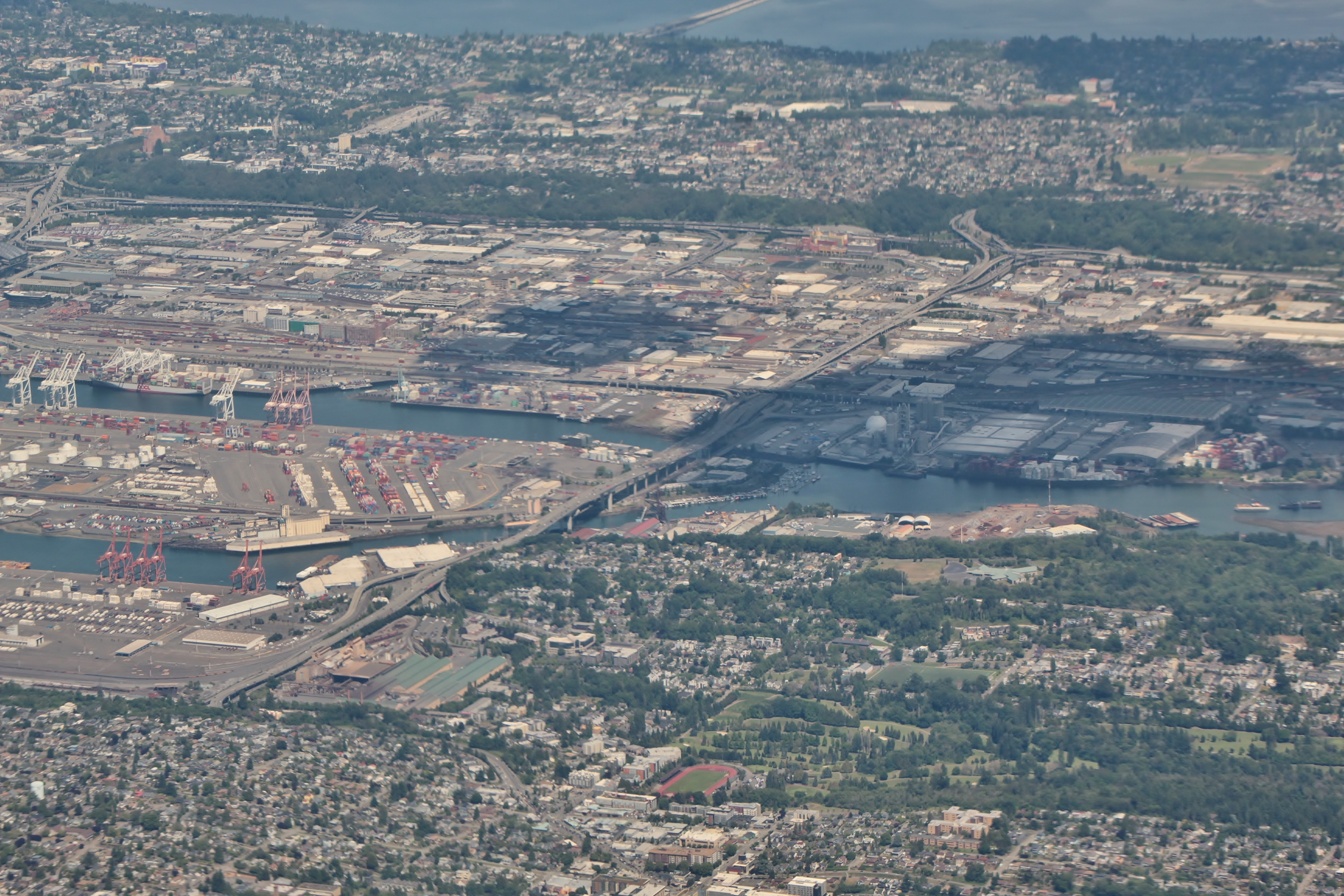
- Aerial view of the West Seattle Bridge and Spokane Street Viaduct

Route information
- Existed: 1945–present

Major junctions
- West end: Fauntleroy Way Southwest and 35th Avenue Southwest in Seattle
- SR 99 in Seattle; I-5 in Seattle
- East end: Columbian Way and 15th Avenue South in Seattle

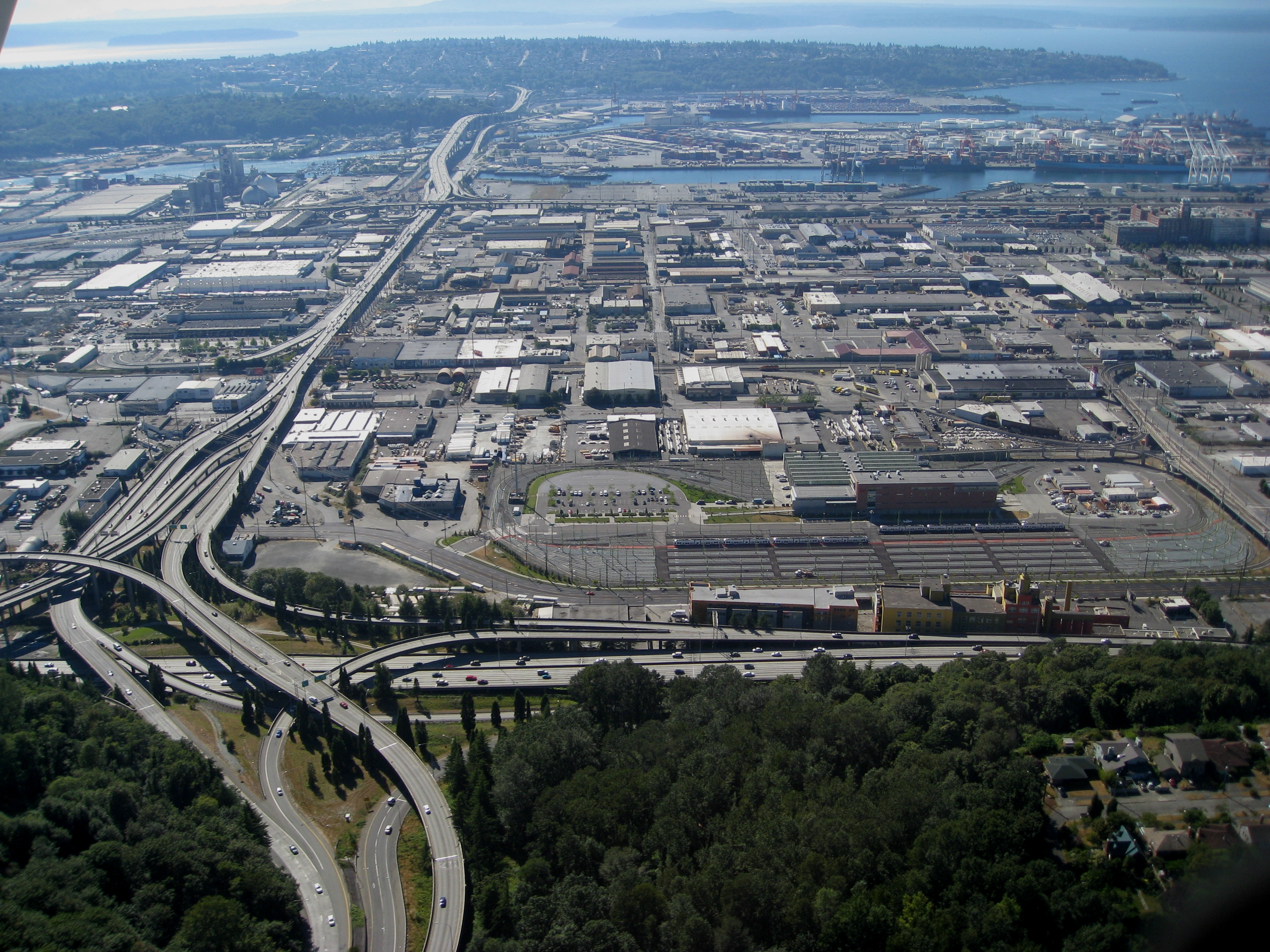
Aerial view of the Spokane Street Viaduct taken 2010 (before widening) facing west. The Interstate 5 interchange is in the foreground, and the West Seattle Bridge is in the background.

The Spokane Street Viaduct is a freeway connecting the West Seattle Bridge to Interstate 5. It runs above South Spokane Street in the SoDo neighborhood of Seattle and is generally four to six lanes wide.

The viaduct was one of Seattle's first freeways, opened in 1945. Over the course of the next few decades, other traffic-separated roadways were built to create a continuous roadway between West Seattle and Beacon Hill, such as the "Fauntleroy-Southwest Spokane Street Viaduct" (which opened in 1965). Upon completion of the high-rise West Seattle Bridge in 1984, the road comprising the Spokane Street Viaduct, the West Seattle Bridge and the Fauntleroy-Southwest Spokane Street Viaduct was referred to as the "West Seattle Freeway". However, a series of fatalities led to recognition that the aging Spokane Street Viaduct portion was unsafe to be used as a high-speed roadway. In 1997, the Seattle City Council unanimously adopted a resolution to lower the speed limit and to request that the WSDOT remove the word "Freeway" from signs marking the entrances to the Spokane Street Viaduct and the West Seattle Bridge.

From 2008 to 2013, the Spokane Street Viaduct section between Interstate 5 and State Route 99 was rebuilt and widened. The widened roadway has three lanes in each direction and shoulders. A new westbound on and off ramp was built at 1st Avenue South and replaced the dangerous 4th Avenue South off-ramp. A new eastbound off-ramp to 4th Avenue South opened August 16, 2010.

The loop ramp from the West Seattle Bridge to northbound State Route 99 was closed on May 2, 2023, due to the formation of a 5 by 4 feet (1.5 m × 1.2 m) hole that left steel rebar exposed. It reopened a week later after the damaged concrete was removed and replaced by WSDOT crews.

== Exit list ==
Destinations	Notes
Fauntleroy Way Southwest, 35th Avenue Southwest	Ends at an at-grade intersection
Admiral Way	Westbound exit and eastbound entrance
Harbor Avenue, Avalon Way	Westbound exit and eastbound entrance
Delridge Way Southwest, Southwest Spokane Street - South Seattle College	Westbound exit and eastbound entrance
11th Avenue Southwest - Harbor Island, Terminal 18	Westbound exit and eastbound entrance
SR 99 north	Eastbound exit and westbound entrance
1st Avenue South	Eastbound exit; westbound exit and entrance
4th Avenue South	Eastbound exit
Spokane Street, 6th Avenue South	Westbound exit and eastbound entrance
I-5 - Portland, Vancouver, BC	
Columbian Way, 15th Avenue South	Eastbound exit and westbound entrance

== See also ==
- West Spokane Street Bridge, a pair of bascule bridges built in the 1920s that were decommissioned by 1989.
- Spokane Street Bridge, a low bridge over the western fork of the Duwamish Waterway opened in 1991.
