= Federal-Aid Highway Act of 1944 =

Federal highway legislation

- Long title: An act to amend and supplement the Federal-Aid Road Act, approved July 11, 1916 as amended and supplemented, to authorize appropriations for the post-war construction of highways and bridges, to eliminate hazards at railroad-grade crossings, to provide for the immediate preparation of plans, and for other purposes
- Enacted by: the 78th United States Congress

Citations
- Public law: Pub. L. 78–521
- Statutes at Large: 58 Stat. 838

Legislative history
- Signed into law by President Franklin D. Roosevelt on December 20, 1944

The Federal-Aid Highway Act of 1944 (Pub. L. 78–521; 58 Stat. 838) is legislation enacted by the United States Congress and signed into law on December 20, 1944, which established a 50–50 formula for subsidizing the construction of national highways and secondary (or "feeder") roads. The legislation established a National System of Interstate Highways, and required the Public Roads Administration to establish construction and operational standards for the Interstate Highway System.

== Legislative history of the act ==
President Franklin D. Roosevelt saw highways as both essential to national defense and the economy, as well as a means of putting unemployed people to work. On April 14, 1941, Roosevelt appointed a National Interregional Highway Committee to study the need for a limited system of national inter-state highways. The committee's report, Interregional Highways, released on January 14, 1943, recommended constructing a 40,000 miles (64,000 km) interstate highway system.

Interregional Highways prompted Congress to act. Although the financial exigencies and materials shortages of World War II would not permit construction of an interstate highway system, post-war planning was at the top of the legislative agenda. The highway bill was among the first pieces of legislation Roosevelt submitted to Congress in January 1944. The Senate Committee on Roads amended the Roosevelt bill substantially. It reduced total federal funding for highways to $450 million a year from $650 million a year; required a 50 percent funding match from states, instead of the proposed 40 percent; and set funding for urban roads and secondary/feeder roads at $125 million a year each (leaving $200 million for the general federal aid program). The House of Representatives passed the legislation on November 29, 1944, after increasing funding for the general federal aid to $225 million a year and secondary/feeder roads to $150 million a year. (Another $173.25 million would be spent building roads in national parks, national forest, and on Native American reservations. This provision was non-controversial in both the Senate and House.) A House–Senate conference committee approved the House-passed version of the bill. On December 12, the House and Senate both passed the report of the conference committee, sending the legislation to President Roosevelt. Roosevelt signed the legislation into law on December 20, 1944.

== Provisions of the act ==
The Federal-Aid Highway Act of 1944 covered federal spending on highways "after the war", which (after World War II ended in August 1945) meant spending in fiscal 1946, 1947, and 1948. Among the act's provisions were:

- Creation of a 40,000-mile (64,000 km) National System of Interstate Highways to connect major cities and industrial areas.
- Creation of a system of secondary (or "collector" or "feeder") roads designed to bring traffic to the interstate highways. These roads, which could be built inside cities or in rural areas, were to serve key functions: Bringing food from local farms and ranches to market; improving rural delivery of mail; and expanding public school bus routes.
- Expenditure in each of the three fiscal years covered by the act of $225 million for general federal highway construction aid; $125 million for the construction of the interstate highway system; and $150 million for the construction of secondary/feeder roads. Funds for general federal highway construction could be used to build the interstate system or secondary/feeder roads, if states chose to use them in that fashion.
- Creation of a funding formula for general federal highway construction (the "federal-aid formula") which took into consideration three factors: One-third of all federal funding in the category was awarded based on the geographic size of the state; one third of federal funding was awarded on the basis of the state's population; and one-third of the funding was awarded based on the miles of rural mail delivery routes to be built. Urban areas were defined as places with more than 5,000 people. There was no guarantee of a minimum amount of funding to be received for urban projects.
- Creation of a funding formula for secondary/feeder roads which took into consideration the same three factors as did the federal-aid formula. However, it substituted rural population for total population, defining rural areas as those places with fewer than 2,500 people. Under the secondary/feeder road formula, each state was guaranteed to receive at least 0.5 percent of the total appropriation available.
- Limitation of the distribution of funds only to state highway departments. The federal government would not contract directly with construction companies.

== Future of the act ==
Although funds were authorized for the construction of interstate and secondary/feeder roads, appropriations (money actually put into accounts by the United States Treasury) for Interstate Highways were not made until passage of the Federal Aid Highway Act of 1956. Appropriations were made, however, for the federal-aid formula and for the secondary/feeder roads programs.

The secondary/feeder roads program was eliminated by the Federal-Aid Highway Act of 1973. The 1973 law created a Rural Secondary Program for rural roads, and an Urban Extensions Program for urban roads.
