= West Seattle Bridge =

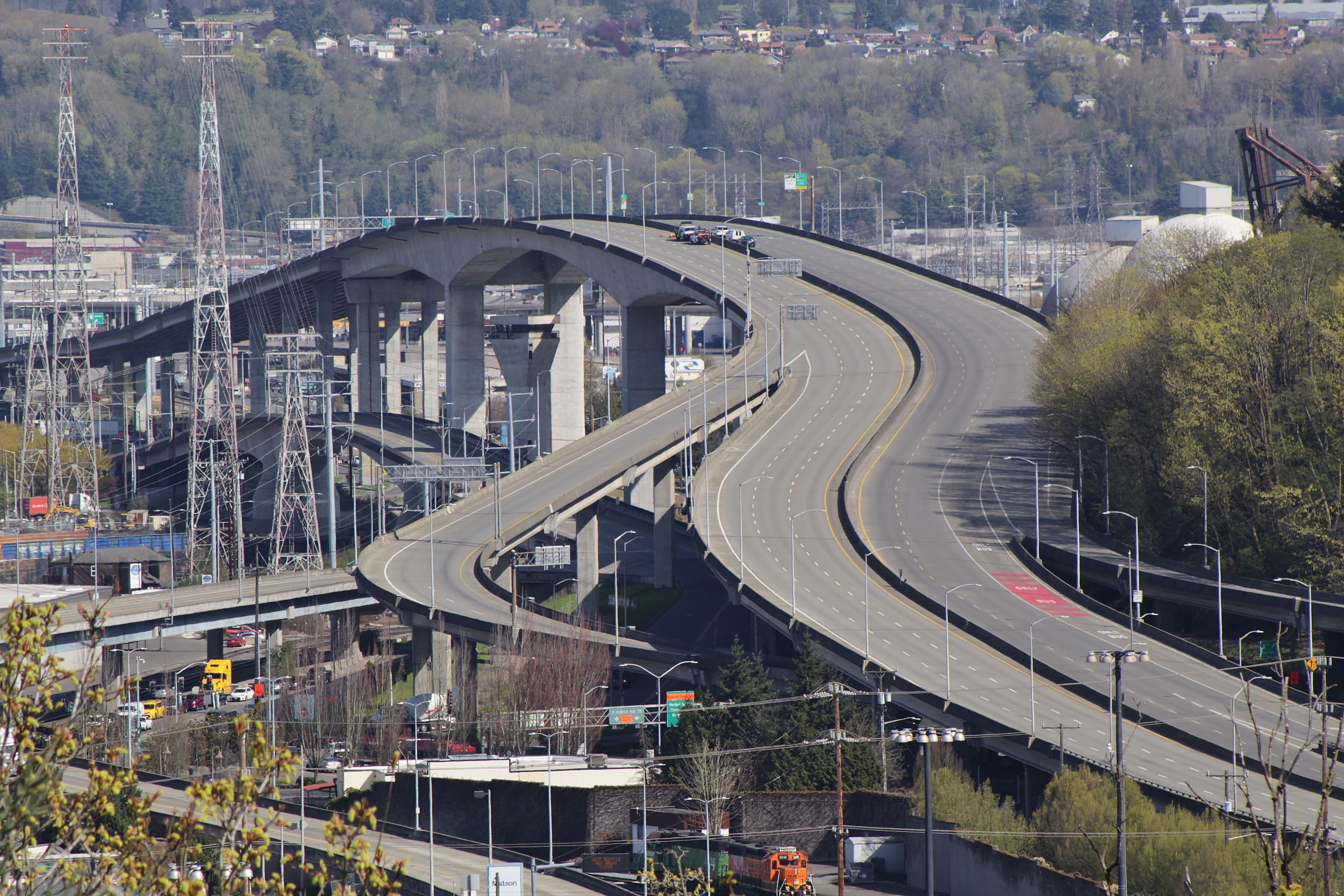
- The West Seattle Bridge from the west side, seen during its closure in 2020
- Coordinates: 47°34′16″N 122°21′00″W
- Carries: 7 lanes
- Crosses: Duwamish Waterway
- Locale: Seattle, Washington
- Other name: Jeanette Williams Memorial Bridge

Characteristics
- Design: segmental, cantilever
- Total length: 2,607 ft (795 m)
- Longest span: 590 ft (179.83 m)
- Clearance below: 140 ft (43 m)

History
- Designer: Andersen Bjornstad Kane Jacobs, Inc.
- Opened: July 14, 1984
- Rebuilt: 2020–2022

Location
- Interactive map of West Seattle Bridge

The West Seattle Bridge, officially the Jeanette Williams Memorial Bridge, is a cantilevered segmental bridge that serves as the primary connection between West Seattle and important highways such as State Route 99 (and the tunnel through downtown), the Spokane Street Viaduct, and Interstate 5. It was built between 1981 and 1984 after the previous bascule bridge was deemed inoperable as a result of being struck by the freighter Antonio Chavez in 1978.

The high-level bridge was closed in March 2020 after cracks in the underside were found to be growing rapidly, necessitating a major repair amid the COVID-19 pandemic. The Seattle Department of Transportation conducted repairs over a two-and-a-half-year period and reopened the bridge on September 17, 2022.

Bicycles are usually not allowed on the bridge.

== Construction ==
The bridge spans the east and west channels that form the mouth of the Duwamish River at Elliott Bay, crossing over Harbor Island. Its main approaches are Fauntleroy Way S.W. from the west and the Spokane Street Viaduct from the east. Drivers heading east over the West Seattle Bridge can continue (via the Spokane Street Viaduct) east to Interstate 5 at Columbian Way (exit 163), forming a three-mile (5 km) arterial between West Seattle and Interstate 5 (which comprises a road formerly known as the "West Seattle Freeway"). The navigational clearance height of the high-level West Seattle Bridge is 140 feet (43 meters).

The low-level Spokane Street Bridge of swing-span design spans the west channel of the Duwamish River immediately north of the high-level bridge. The low-level bridge carries the surface-level Spokane Street and has a navigational clearance of 45 feet (14 meters).

== History ==
Spokane Street has long been used as designation for the streets running along the latitude of the current West Seattle Bridge. Construction on the "West Spokane Street Bridge" (a bascule drawbridge) was completed in 1924, and the bridge lasted over fifty years. Then (in 1978) the portion of the bridge carrying the westbound lanes of the bridge was rammed by the Chavez. The bridge formerly carrying the eastbound lanes remained open until 1984, at which point the high-level bridge (the "West Seattle Bridge") was opened. The low-level bascule bridge remained open until 1991, when the "Spokane Street Bridge" (a swing bridge) was opened.

=== West Spokane Street Bridge (1924-1984) ===
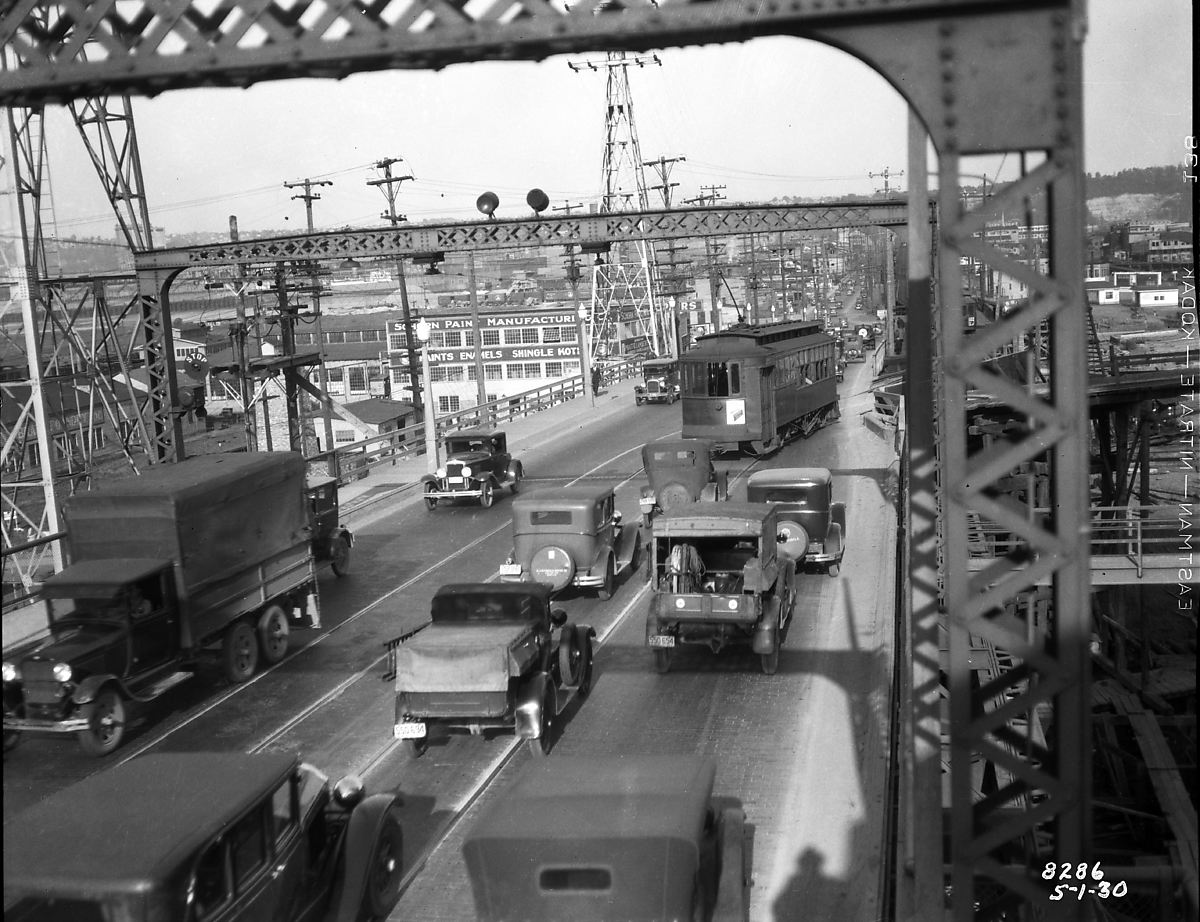
Traffic on the West Spokane Street Bridge in 1930

The bridge that preceded the "West Seattle Bridge" as we know it today was called the "West Spokane Street Bridge". Before any permanent bridge was built along the line of Spokane Street, there had been three temporary bridges, built c. 1900, c. 1910, and c. 1918. The first one was basically a swinging gate in what had been primarily built as a water main; the second was a swing bridge that also carried a water main, and the third was a swing bridge after the water main had been rerouted elsewhere.

A more permanent bascule bridge was constructed in 1924, which lasted for several decades. In 1945, one of Seattle's oldest freeways (the "Spokane Street Viaduct") connected the bridge to Beacon Hill. Prior to the construction of Interstate 5 in Washington, the viaduct was separated from the bridge by the main north–south corridor: U.S. Route 99 in Washington.

By the 1970s, the West Spokane Street Bridge was one of Seattle's worst bottlenecks, due to the large number of ships in Duwamish Waterway and the frequent bridge openings. City leaders began planning a higher bridge, without a drawbridge, in the 1960s.

=== Replacement bridge project ===
Planning for the bridge was hampered by difficulties in receiving funding. In large part, this is because the bridge was not a designated highway. A 1968 Forward Thrust ballot measure included $16.7 million in funding for the bridge, largely to receive votes from West Seattle residents. Other funding sources included a state program for funding urban streets and money from a maintenance fund.

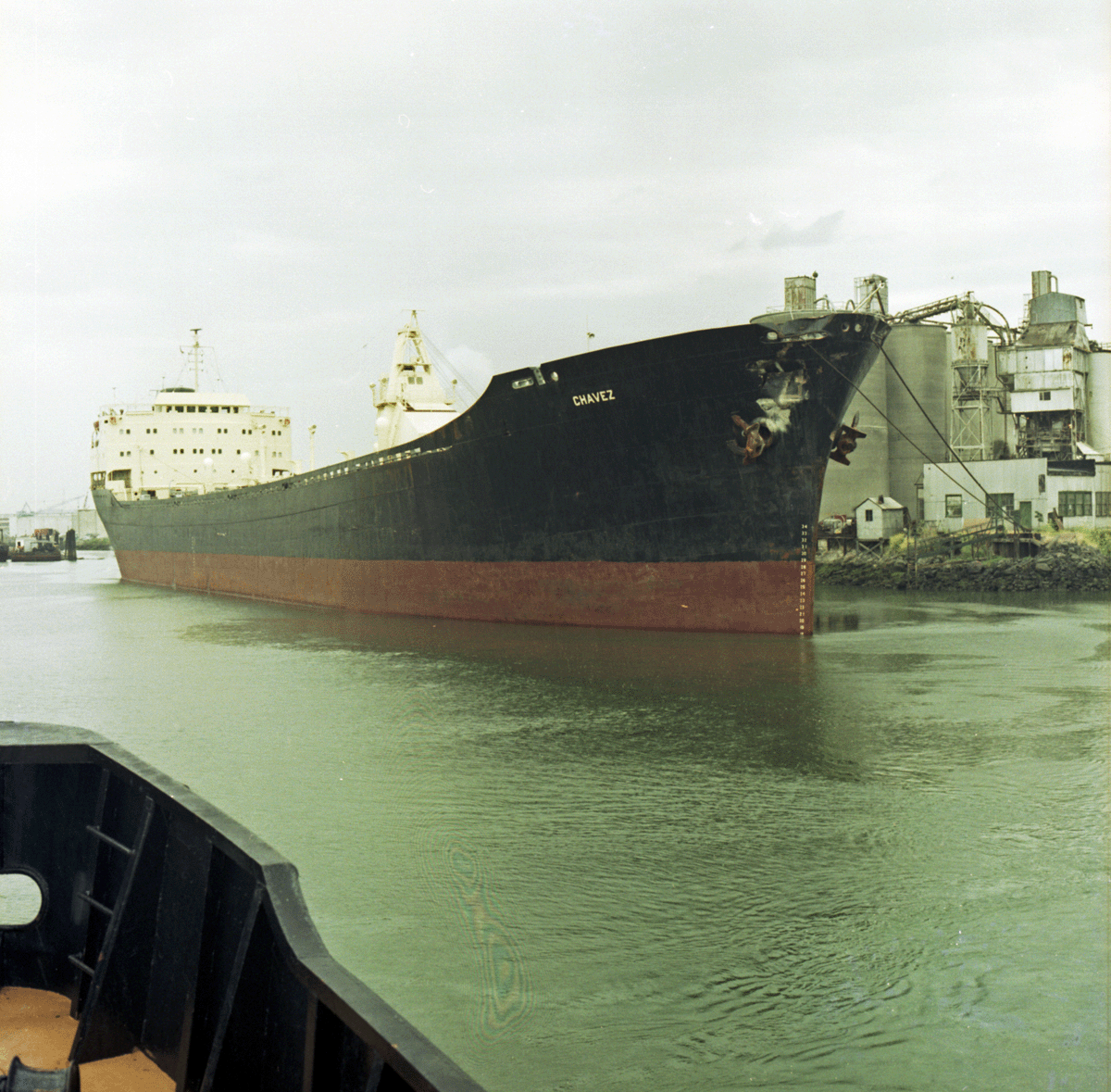
The Antonio Chavez, the ship that hit the West Spokane Street Bridge in 1978.

After a long drawn-out process, three companies eventually bid to design the bridge for $1.5 million. However, the city engineer chose a fourth company that was financially connected to the speaker of the state house. The price from this fourth company was triple the cost of the other three. This was a result of a series of bribes involving the head of the House Transportation Committee, the city engineer and others. Despite the 68 percent support in the 1968 ballot measure, the state withdrew its urban streets money due to the scandal. In 1976 and 1977, the conspirators were placed on trial and imprisoned.

After the scandal, the project was considered dead. Norbert Tiemann, a federal highway regulator, stated that there would essentially be no chance of the project receiving federal funds for completion. Tiemann also quipped, "Short of a tug knocking it down (which could trigger federal special bridge replacement funds), there is nothing else. And you certainly wouldn't want to go that route." In March 1978, several prominent West Seattle residents filed a petition to organize a secession referendum, with the hopes of finding state funding for a new bridge to serve their independent city. The secession campaign was required to gather 29,000 signatures for a ballot measure, but were unable to meet the threshold before the northern or westbound drawbridge was permanently closed and all east–west traffic was funneled over the southern span.

=== 1978 closure ===
On June 11, 1978, a ship struck the old bridge, which left it open and unrepairable. Because of this, the project qualified for funds from the federal Office of Special Bridge Replacement. However, with many other damaged bridges to replace, this program alone did not have sufficient funding. While federal lawmakers were opposed to appropriating funds to a high-level bridge, Seattle City Council member Jeanette Williams, who served on the council from 1970 to 1989, lobbied Congress for the bridge and successfully secured funds with help from Senator Warren Magnuson. The smaller Spokane Street Bridge which parallels it was built at the same time.

=== Jeanette Williams Memorial Bridge ===
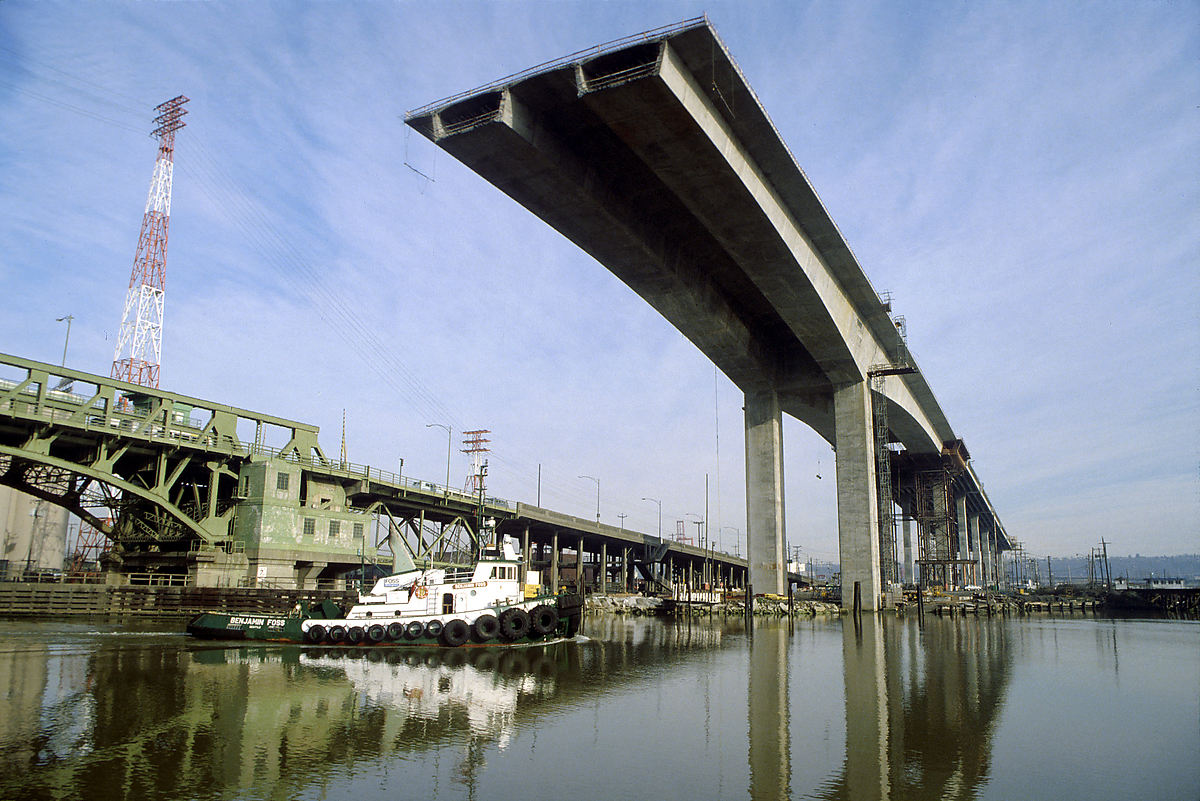
West Seattle Bridge under construction, c. 1983

The replacement bridge was opened in 1984. The West Seattle Bridge was renamed as the Jeanette Williams Memorial Bridge on July 6, 2009, in honor of councilmember Williams, who had been instrumental in securing political support for the construction of the bridge. All directional signs still carry the name "West Seattle Bridge", many of which had formerly borne the designation "West Seattle Freeway".

The bridge caused an increase in property values as well as a development boom, as developers constructed new multi-family housing. This new development also led to an increase in traffic volumes throughout the neighborhood.

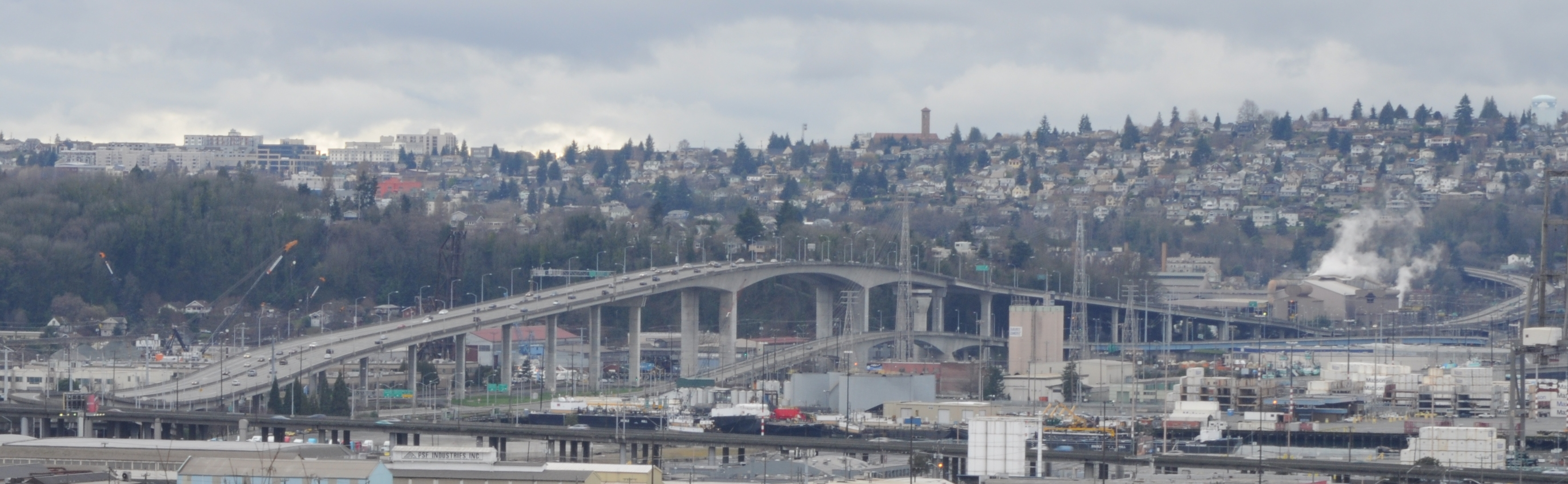
West Seattle Bridge seen from the 12th Avenue South viewpoint on Beacon Hill in 2010.

A monorail extension to West Seattle in the early 2000s was planned to use the West Seattle Bridge, with elevated columns over the center barrier. The plan was later scaled down to a single-track guideway over the bridge and abandoned entirely in 2005 over cost concerns.

=== Spokane Street Bridge ===
After completion of the high-level bridge, a lower bridge was needed to carry traffic between Harbor Island and West Seattle. The "Spokane Street Bridge" (or the "West Seattle Low-Level Bridge") is a concrete double-leaf swing bridge that was constructed for traffic formerly carried by the West Spokane Street Bridge. It carries Southwest Spokane Street over the Duwamish River, connecting Harbor Island to West Seattle. It has two separate end-to-end swing-span sections, each 480 feet (150 m) long. Its construction was finished in 1991, replacing an earlier bridge destroyed by a collision. It is named after Spokane Street, which itself is named after Spokane, Washington, which is named after the Spokane people.

Each 7,500-short-ton (6,800 t) leaf of the bridge floats on a 100-inch (2.5 m) steel barrel in hydraulic oil, situated in center piers at each side of the river. As the bridge intersects the river at an oblique angle, both leaves rotate only 45 degrees (one-eighth turn) to clear the shipping channel instead of the 90-degree turn of most swing spans. It is claimed to be the only bridge of its type in the world and it has received several awards for its innovation, including the Outstanding Engineering Achievement Award of the American Society of Civil Engineers in 1992.

=== 2020–22 repairs ===
On March 23, 2020, SDOT began a long-term closure of the bridge for emergency repairs after cracks in the deck were discovered during a routine inspection. The girder wall cracks had grown to 2 ft (0.61 m) within a month, while the hollow girder cracks had been noticed during inspections. An earlier report from 2014 speculated that earlier cracks had been caused by the 2001 Nisqually earthquake. On April 15, SDOT announced that the bridge will be closed until at least 2022 because of more extensive damage found and estimated time to complete bracing for the repair project.

In November 2020, mayor Jenny Durkan announced that the city would focus on repairing the bridge for $47 million with a projected opening of 2022. An option to replace the damaged section with a new steel span would have been completed in 2025 or 2026 and cost $390 million to $522 million. Kraemer North America was selected as the main contractor for the bridge repair project in May 2021. Delays on the "mid-2022" reopening were incurred by a multi-month concrete workers strike. The bridge reopened to traffic on September 17, 2022, two months later than originally expected. The repaired structure is expected to have a 95 percent chance of lasting until 2060; a future replacement was studied as part of the repair program along with an option to immediately replace the damaged bridge.

== Spokane Street Viaduct ==
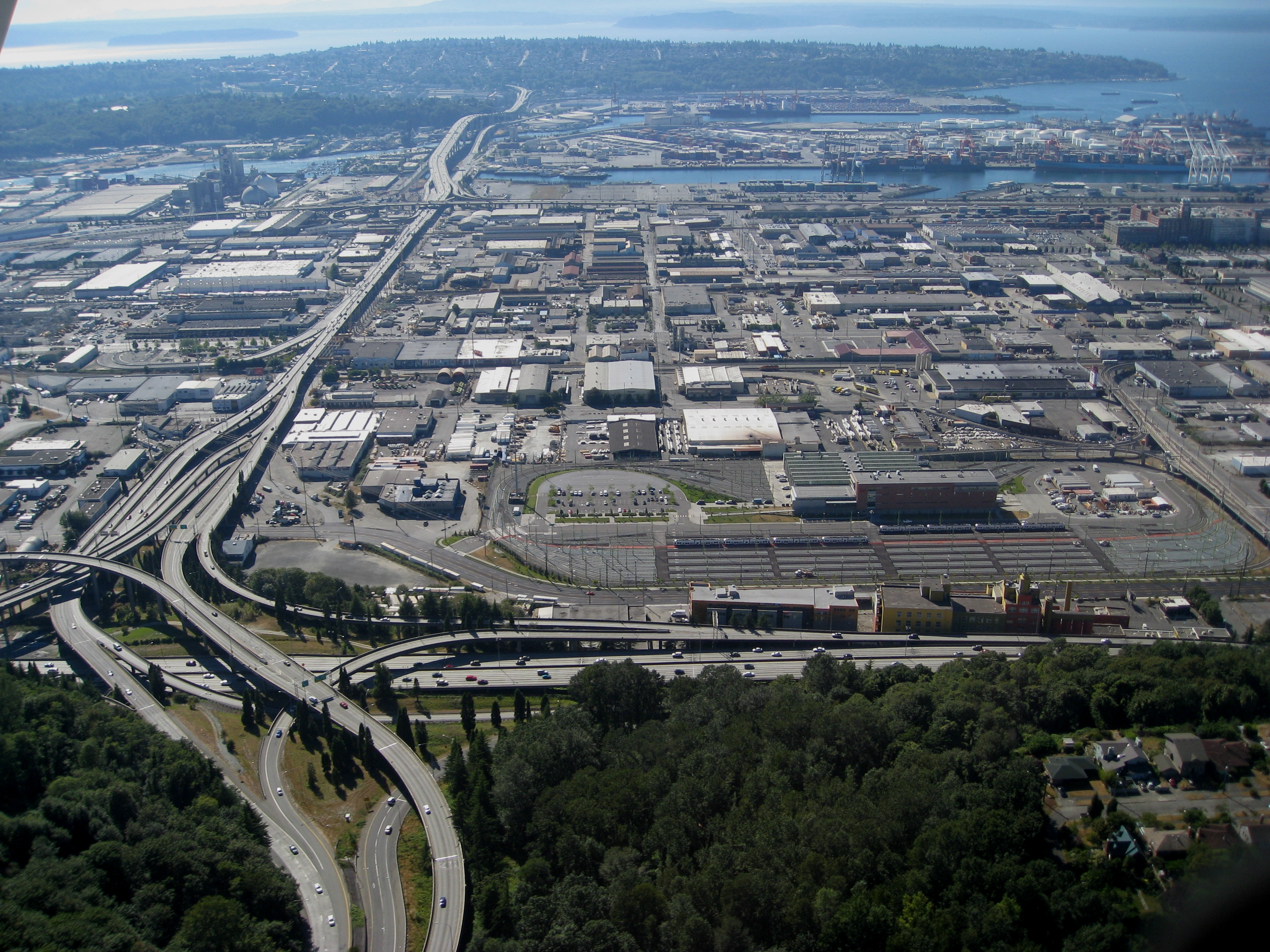
Aerial view of the Spokane Street Viaduct taken 2010 (before widening) facing west. The Interstate 5 interchange is in the foreground, and the West Seattle Bridge is in the background.

The Spokane Street Viaduct section was one of Seattle's first freeways, built in 1945. Upon completion of the West Seattle Bridge in 1984, the road comprising the Spokane Street Viaduct and the West Seattle Bridge was referred to as the "West Seattle Freeway". However, a series of fatalities led to recognition that the aging Spokane Street Viaduct portion was unsafe to be used as a high-speed roadway. In 1997, the Seattle City Council unanimously adopted a resolution to lower the speed limit and to request that the WSDOT remove the word "Freeway" from signs marking the entrances to the Spokane Street Viaduct and the West Seattle Bridge. The West Seattle Bridge was renamed as the Jeanette Williams Memorial Bridge on July 6, 2009, in honor of councilmember Williams, who had been instrumental in securing political support for the construction of the bridge. However, all directional signs continue to carry the name "West Seattle Bridge."

From 2008 to 2013, the Spokane Street Viaduct section between Interstate 5 and State Route 99 was rebuilt and widened. The widened roadway has three lanes in each direction and shoulders. A new westbound on and off ramp was built at 1st Avenue South and replaced the dangerous 4th Avenue South off-ramp. A new eastbound off-ramp to 4th Avenue South opened August 16, 2010.

== See also ==
- Spokane Street Bridge, the "low" bridge that makes the same crossing.
