= Jeanette Williams =

American politician and activist

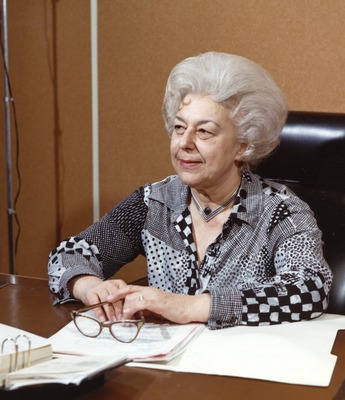
- Jeanette Williams, January 14, 1974

Seattle City Council Member
- In office 1969–1989
- Succeeded by: Cheryl Chow

President of the Seattle City Council
- In office January 3, 1982 – January 3, 1984
- Preceded by: Paul Kraabel
- Succeeded by: Norm Rice

Personal details
- Born: June 11, 1914 Seattle, Washington
- Died: October 24, 2008 (aged 94) Seattle, Washington
- Party: Democratic
- Spouse: David Williams
- Education: University of Washington, American Conservatory of Music
- Profession: Politician, Activist, Musician

Alice Jeanette Williams (June 11, 1914 – October 24, 2008), née Alice Jeanette Klemptner, was an American politician and human and women's rights activist from Seattle, Washington. She served on the Seattle City Council from 1969 to 1989.

== Early years ==
Born in Seattle, Washington to Russian immigrants, Dr. Louis and Olga Klemptner, she attended Mercer Grade School and Queen Anne High School. Originally named after woman suffragist Alice Paul, she went by her middle name Jeanette beginning in her youth. At the age of 16, she attended Cornish School where she studied the violin with Peter Meremblum. She later took private lessons from Mary Davenport Engberg concurrent with her studies at the University of Washington, where she did not major in violin or music, but instead received her undergraduate degree in Liberal Arts in 1935. She went on to obtain two master's degrees at the American Conservatory of Music in Violin and Composition. While in Chicago, she played with the Chicago Philharmonic Orchestra and formed a string quartet composed of women who toured the country playing jazz and blues music. She married David Williams of Anacortes whom she had met while travelling to Los Angeles with the group.

== Political career ==
Williams began her political career while serving as a precinct committee officer. In 1962, she became chairwoman of the King County Democrats, although she was not the first woman to be elected to this position.

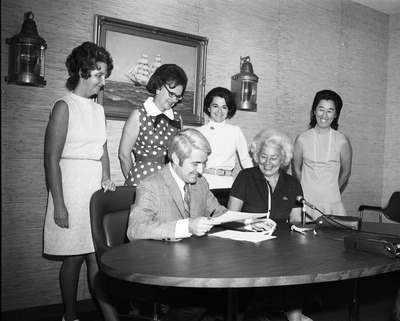
Williams with Mayor Uhlman signing proclamation for Seattle Women's Commission, August 23, 1972

In 1969, she won a seat on the Seattle City Council where she would serve for twenty years after five consecutive re-elections. Williams introduced some of the first legislation to prohibit employment and housing discrimination against gays and lesbians in the city. She pushed for additional laws giving the same protections to transgender people. Councilman Tom Rasmussen noted that Williams "fought for women's rights and the rights of gay and lesbian people long before it was acceptable, when it was a very courageous and risky thing to do."

In 1972, Williams formed the Seattle Women's Commission to advise the mayor, city council, and city departments on issues that impact women in Seattle. During her tenure, she lobbied the federal government for funding for the construction of the West Seattle Bridge and led and supported many efforts related to Seattle parks. She introduced legislation to convert Kubota Garden to a city park and promoted the preservation of the Sand Point Naval Air Station as Magnuson Park.

== Legacy ==
In 2009, the West Seattle Bridge was named in Williams' honor. In 2003, the Jeanette Williams Award was created as part of the 2003 Seattle Women’s Summit to recognize an individual who demonstrates significant leadership and service in advancing the cause of women in Seattle. The award is granted on an annual basis and as of 2014 has expanded to include awards for an individual, organization, and business.

Political offices
Preceded by	Seattle City Council Member; 1969–1989	Succeeded by Cheryl Chow
