= Spokane Street Bridge =

Swing bridge in Seattle, Washington, United States

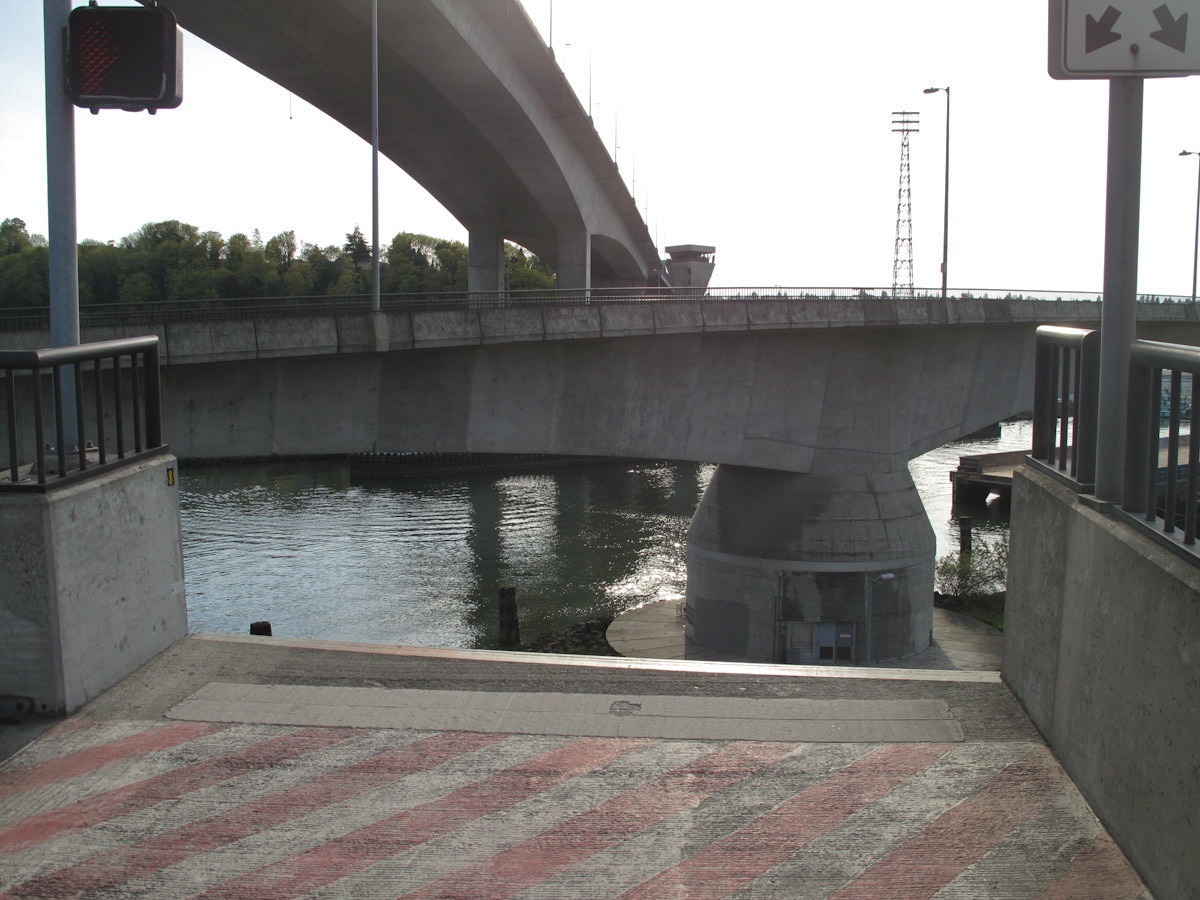
- One of the bridge's swing-span sections turned
- Coordinates: 47°34′17″N 122°21′12″W
- Carries: Spokane Street
- Crosses: Duwamish River
- Locale: Seattle, Washington, U.S.

Characteristics
- Design: Concrete swing bridge
- Longest span: 480 feet (150 m)

History
- Opened: 1991

The Spokane Street Bridge, also known as the West Seattle Low-Level Bridge, is a concrete double-leaf swing bridge in Seattle, Washington. It carries Southwest Spokane Street over the Duwamish River, connecting Harbor Island to West Seattle. It has two separate end-to-end swing-span sections, each 480 feet (150 m) long. Its construction was finished in 1991, replacing an earlier bridge destroyed by a collision. It is named after Spokane Street, which itself is named after Spokane, Washington, which is named after the Spokane people.

Each 7,500-short-ton (6,800 t) leaf of the bridge floats on a 100-inch (2.5 m) steel barrel in hydraulic oil, situated in center piers at each side of the river. As the bridge intersects the river at an oblique angle, both leaves rotate only 45 degrees (one-eighth turn) to clear the shipping channel instead of the 90-degree turn of most swing spans. It is claimed to be the only bridge of its type in the world and it has received several awards for its innovation, including the Outstanding Engineering Achievement Award of the American Society of Civil Engineers in 1992. In a typical year, it opens approximately 1,500 times for river traffic.

The bridge was featured in a 2007 episode of Really Big Things shown on the Discovery Channel.

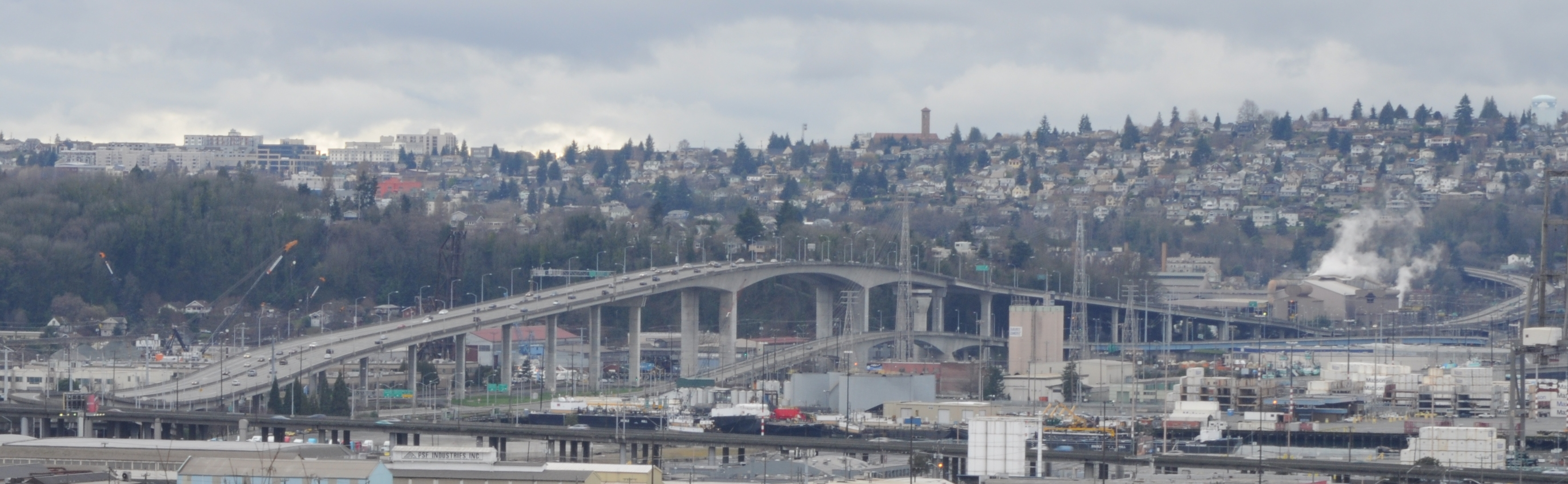
The Spokane Street Bridge is the lower of the two bridges visible in this picture. Behind it is the higher West Seattle Bridge.

== History ==
The prior bridge at this location was the West Spokane Street Bridge, which opened in 1924 (augmented by a second bridge in 1930). In 1968 and 1970, a series of bond propositions ("Forward Thrust") were offered to replace the prior bridges, but did not receive the required approval. A 1978 freighter collision with the 1924 bridge (and subsequent closure) exacerbated the need to replace the older bridges, and federal funding was secured. The West Seattle Bridge was opened in 1984 to carry most of the traffic previously handled by the old West Spokane Street Bridge, with the lower Spokane Street Bridge opening in 1991 to serve local traffic to Harbor Island.

The high-rise bridge was closed in March 2020 due to rapid growth of cracks on its underside, leaving the Spokane Street Bridge as the main route to West Seattle. The lower bridge was restricted to transit, freight, emergency vehicles, and longshore workers, with limited patrols by police. Beginning in late June, general traffic was allowed to use the Spokane Street Bridge from 9 p.m. to 5 a.m. Automatic ticketing cameras were installed in January 2021 and issued 5,300 tickets in the first weeks of February. The high-rise bridge was reopened to traffic on September 17, 2022, and restrictions on the Spokane Street Bridge ended at the same time.

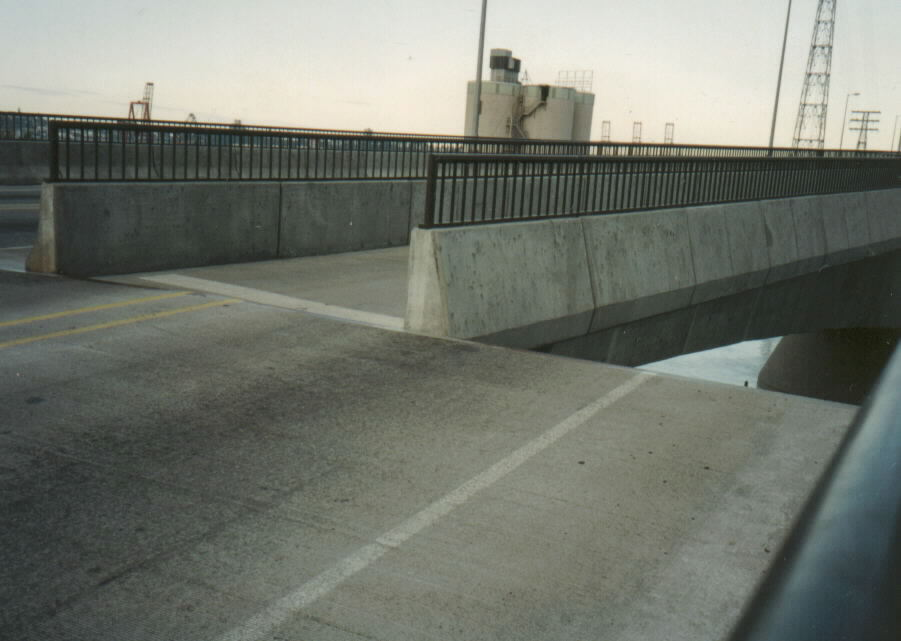
Bike lane on the bridge as the bridge starts rotating.

SDOT began repairs to the Spokane Street Bridge in mid-2022 to reinforce its swing span with epoxy and carbon fiber, similar to the work carried out on the high-rise bridge. Additional upgrades to the hydraulic systems, computers, and communications lines are planned to begin in 2023. The bridge was closed on December 23, 2022, after it failed to close properly during a major ice storm. Crews then discovered more severe damage to the position sensor and hydraulic seal that control the bridge's movement, prompting a longer closure. It reopened on January 13, 2023, following three weeks of repairs. A temporary bicycle lane was installed in SODO to mitigate the bridge's closure. The bridge was closed for four days in October 2023 to repair and reinstall the hydraulic cylinder in the eastern tower, which had been removed in January.
