= Harbor Island, Seattle =

Artificial island in Washington, US

Coordinates: 47°34′45″N 122°21′5″W

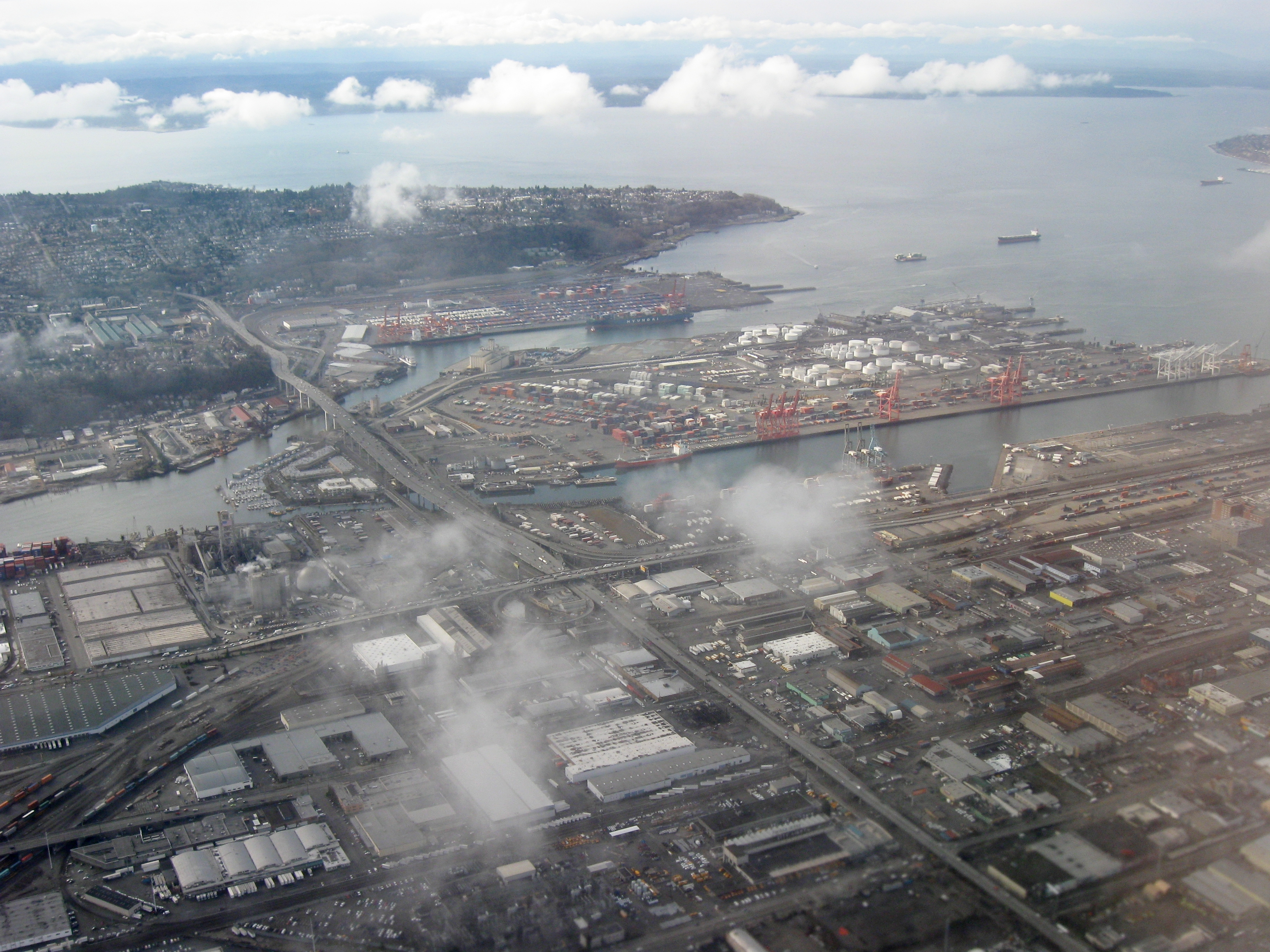
Aerial view of Harbor Island and the West Seattle Bridge/Spokane Street Viaduct from the southeast

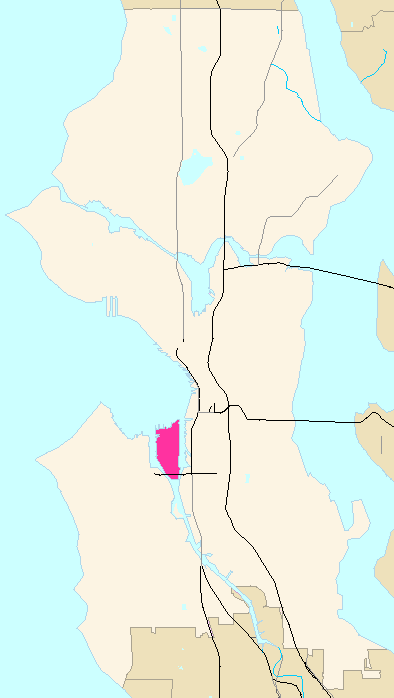
Harbor Island

Harbor Island is an artificial island in the mouth of the Duwamish River in Seattle, Washington, United States, where it empties into Elliott Bay. Built by the Puget Sound Bridge and Dredging Company, it was completed in 1909 and was then the largest artificial island in the world, at 350 acres (1.4 km^{2}). Since 1912, the island has been used for commercial and industrial activities including secondary lead smelting, shipbuilding and repair, bulk petroleum storage, metal fabrication and containerized cargo shipping. Warehouses, laboratories and other buildings are located on the island.

Harbor Island was made from 24 million yd^{3} (18 million m^{3}) of earth removed in the Jackson and Dearborn Street regrades and dredged from the bed of the Duwamish River.

Harbor Island lost its title as the world's largest artificial island in 1938 with the completion of Treasure Island in San Francisco Bay, at 395 acres (1.60 km^{2}). It regained the title in 1967, at which time its area had increased to nearly 397 acres (1.61 km^{2}), but has now been far surpassed in area; since 2004, Rokkō Island in Kobe harbor in Japan is over 3.5 times larger. The official land area, as reported by the United States Census Bureau, was 406.91 acres (164.67 ha), at the 2000 census. There was also a permanent population of three persons reported on the island at that time.

The West Seattle Bridge passes over the island, as does the newer Spokane Street Bridge, a swing bridge across the West Waterway. The East Waterway is crossed by a causeway supported a few feet above high tide by pilings.

Vigor Industrial operates a 27-acre (11 ha) shipyard on the island, which is also the site of some of the Port of Seattle's terminals and the publishing branch of The Mountaineers (Mountaineering: The Freedom of the Hills, among others).

The Seattle-Tacoma Shipbuilding Corporation built 45 destroyers for the United States Navy on the island from 1941 to 1946, in a yard now owned by Vigor.

== See also ==
- List of structures on Elliott Bay#Harbor Island
