= Washington State Route 520 =

Freeway in King County, Washington, US

State Route 520
- Map of Seattle and the Eastside, with SR 520 highlighted in red

Route information
- Auxiliary route of I-5
- Maintained by WSDOT
- Length: 12.82 mi (20.63 km)
- Existed: 1964–present

Major junctions
- West end: I-5 in Seattle
- I-405 in Bellevue
- East end: SR 202 in Redmond

Location
- Country: United States
- State: Washington
- County: King

Highway system
- State highways in Washington; Interstate; US; State; Scenic; Pre-1964; 1964 renumbering; Former
| ← SR 519 | → SR 522 |

State Route 520 (SR 520) is a state highway and freeway in the Seattle metropolitan area, part of the U.S. state of Washington. It runs 13 miles (21 km) from Seattle in the west to Redmond in the east. The freeway connects Seattle to the Eastside region of King County via the Evergreen Point Floating Bridge on Lake Washington. SR 520 intersects several state highways, including Interstate 5 (I-5) in Seattle, I-405 in Bellevue, and SR 202 in Redmond.

The original floating bridge was opened in 1963 as a replacement for the cross-lake ferry system that had operated since the late 19th century. In 1964, SR 520 was designated as a freeway connecting I-5 to I-405. An extension to Redmond was proposed later in the decade. In the 1970s and 1980s, sections of the freeway between Bellevue and Redmond were opened to traffic, replacing the temporary designation of SR 920.

Since the 1990s, SR 520 has been expanded with high-occupancy vehicle lanes (HOV lanes) and new interchanges to serve the Overlake area. In 2016, the original Evergreen Point Floating Bridge was replaced by a wider bridge, as part of a multibillion-dollar expansion program that is scheduled to be completed in the 2020s. The program also includes the construction of new bus infrastructure at Montlake and on the Eastside, as well as a bicycle and pedestrian path along most of the highway's length.

== Route description ==
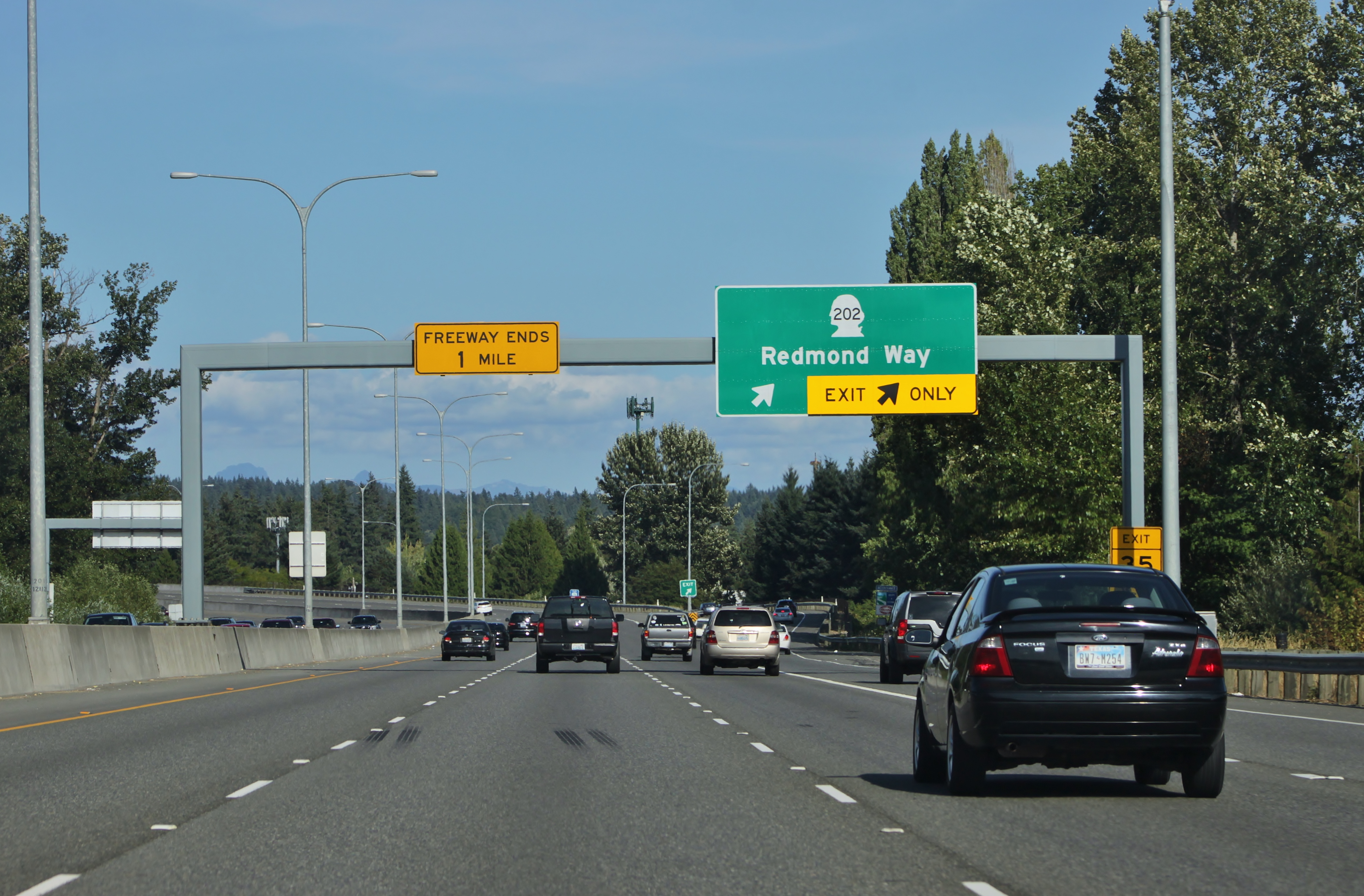
SR 520 eastbound approaching SR 202 in Downtown Redmond

SR 520 begins at an interchange with I-5 in northern Seattle near Roanoke Park. The interchange provides access to both directions of I-5 as well as a westbound off-ramp to Harvard Avenue and Roanoke Street. SR 520 travels east across the south end of Portage Bay and its wetlands on the Portage Bay Viaduct, entering the Montlake neighborhood. In Montlake, the highway intersects Montlake Boulevard (SR 513) and Lake Washington Boulevard just south of the University of Washington campus and Husky Stadium. The freeway gains a set of HOV lanes and continues east on a pair of causeways through the marshlands of Union Bay and Foster Island, at the north end of the Washington Park Arboretum.

From Seattle, SR 520 crosses Lake Washington on the six-lane Evergreen Point Floating Bridge; at 7,710 feet (2,350 m), it is the longest floating bridge in the world. Tolls are collected electronically using the state's Good to Go pass or by mail, and vary based on time of day and the vehicle's number of axles. As of 2024, tolls for Good to Go users range from a minimum of $1.35 between 11:00 p.m. and 5:00 a.m. and a maximum of $4.90 during the morning and evening peak periods; tolls paid by mail are charged an additional $2. The freeway reaches the eastern end of Lake Washington at Evergreen Point in northern Medina, where it travels under a landscaped park lid and next to a median-side bus station. After an interchange and lid at 84th Avenue Northeast in Hunts Point, SR 520 travels eastward around the northern edge of Clyde Hill in a north-facing arc, passing through the Yarrow Point lid and bus station. The freeway enters Bellevue, intersecting I-405 and crossing over the Eastside Rail Corridor. SR 520 continues along the north side of the Bel-Red industrial area and enters the Overlake area of Redmond.

Within Overlake, SR 520 turns north and passes under a pedestrian bridge connecting to Overlake Village station on the 2 Line, a light rail line that follows the highway. The freeway then passes several office parks, including the headquarters campus of Microsoft and the Nintendo of America branch office. To serve exits at Northeast 40th Street and Northeast 51st Street, SR 520 gains a set of collector–distributor lanes, separated from other lanes by a concrete barrier. The freeway crosses the Sammamish River and turns east, passing to the south of the Redmond Town Center mall and Bear Creek and to the north of Marymoor Park. East of downtown Redmond, SR 520 intersects SR 202 and terminates; the road continues north as Avondale Road towards Cottage Lake. Portions of the corridor from Montlake to Downtown Redmond are also paralleled by a shared-use trail for bicycles and pedestrians.

SR 520's entire route is designated as part of the National Highway System, classifying it as important to the national economy, defense, and mobility. The State of Washington also designates the SR 520 corridor as a Highway of Statewide Significance, a category of highways that connect major communities throughout the state. SR 520 is maintained by the Washington State Department of Transportation (WSDOT), which conducts an annual survey on the state's highways to measure traffic volume in terms of annual average daily traffic. In 2016, WSDOT calculated that 80,000 vehicles traveled on SR 520 near its interchange with SR 202 in Redmond and 47,000 vehicles used it at SR 513 in Seattle, the highest and lowest traffic counts along the highway, respectively. The highway is noted for its lack of a "reverse commute", with roughly equal amounts of traffic in both directions during peak periods.

== History ==
=== Ferries and proposed floating bridge ===
New towns along the eastern shore of Lake Washington were established in the late 19th century and initially served by steamship ferries, bringing passengers and goods to and from Seattle. By 1913, the steam ferry Leschi was transporting automobiles and pedestrians between Seattle and the docks in Bellevue, Kirkland, and Medina. In 1940, the Lake Washington Floating Bridge was opened between Seattle and Mercer Island, carrying the Sunset Highway (later I-90) from Seattle towards Bellevue and the Eastside. The new bridge allowed the Eastside to develop rapidly into bedroom communities in the 1940s and 1950s; the bridge also replaced the ferry system, which ceased operation in 1950, shortly after the removal of tolls on the bridge.

In the late 1940s, the state government conducted a feasibility study for a second floating bridge across Lake Washington, in response to increased traffic on the Mercer Island bridge. In 1953, the Washington State Legislature approved the construction of a second floating bridge, using past and future tolls to fund its construction. The west end of the floating bridge was to connect to the Everett–Seattle tollway (later I-5) at Roanoke Street, south of the planned Ship Canal Bridge, as well as the proposed Empire Way Expressway (later the R.H. Thompson Expressway) at Montlake. The east end was to connect to the planned north–south freeway bypass of the Seattle area (later I-405), with an optional connection to the Stevens Pass Highway. Two alignments for the floating bridge were considered in the late 1950s: a Sand Point–Kirkland, favored by the City of Seattle; and an Evergreen Point crossing, favored by the state government and the U.S. Navy, which operated Naval Air Station Sand Point. The state government initially chose the Montlake–Evergreen Point alignment in 1954, intending to begin construction in 1955, but the alignment dispute delayed a final decision until December 1956. Citizen groups from the Montlake area protested the decision, but were largely ignored by the project's citizen committee.

=== Opening of floating bridge and freeway ===
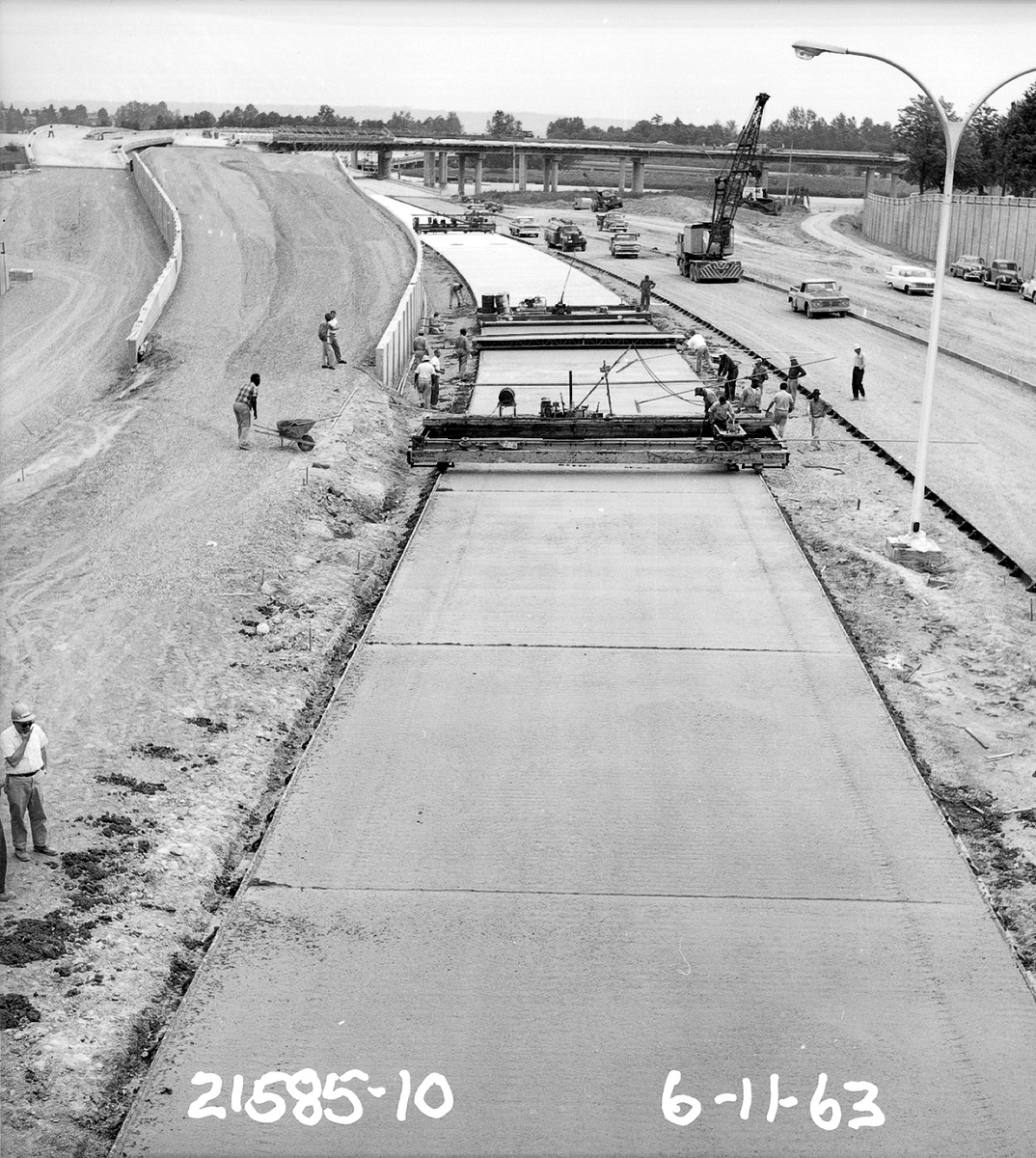
SR 520 under construction in 1963, pictured east of Montlake Boulevard

Construction of the Evergreen Point Floating Bridge began on August 29, 1960, and assembly of the bridge's pontoons began the following year. The bridge and its approach highways, connecting the main branch of Primary State Highway 1 in Seattle to its Eastside branch near Bellevue, were added to the state highway system in March 1961. Construction of the western approach, an expressway between the Roanoke Interchange, Portage Bay, Montlake, and the Washington Park Arboretum, began in early 1962. The eastern approach was constructed between 1962 and 1963, connecting the bridge to Medina, Secondary State Highway 2A in southern Houghton, and Northup Way—a local road that continued east towards Redmond.

The Evergreen Point Floating Bridge opened on August 28, 1963, along with the Roanoke Expressway, part of the Seattle Freeway, and the eastern approach to Houghton and Bellevue up to a temporary interchange with 104th Avenue Northeast. The bridge and its approaches, constituting a state highway, were re-designated as Sign Route 520 (later SR 520) under the new state highway numbering system adopted in 1964. SR 520 would use a temporary route on Northup Way (Northeast 20th Street) and Bel-Red Road between Bellevue and SR 202 in Redmond until the planned freeway was completed by the late 1970s. A section of SR 520 between the Evergreen Point Bridge toll plaza and 104th Avenue Northeast was expanded in 1973 to accommodate a bus-only lane at the request of Metro Transit, which had begun operating express buses over the bridge.

=== Extension to Redmond ===
The Northup Interchange, where SR 520 intersects I-405, was opened on November 22, 1966. The highway was also extended east from 104th Avenue Northeast to 124th Avenue Northeast, serving the Bel-Red industrial area. The state government announced plans in 1968 to begin construction on the remaining freeway to Redmond, via a northeastward course through the Overlake area and across Marymoor Park. Construction of a 1.3-mile-long (2.1 km) segment between 124th Avenue Northeast and 148th Avenue Northeast in Overlake began in February 1972 and was completed in December 1973.

The planned route of SR 520 along the north side of Marymoor Park in Redmond was given the temporary designation of SR 920 in 1975. The two-lane expressway, connecting West Lake Sammamish Parkway (SR 901) and SR 202, was opened in July 1977 after several months of construction. Completion of the last segment of SR 520, between 148th Avenue Northeast and SR 920, was given priority by Eastside cities and civic groups in the mid-1970s. However, the City of Bellevue asked that the state government build a reversible bus lane on the Evergreen Point Floating Bridge before completing the last segment, due to increased traffic on the bridge. The City of Redmond opposed the request, leading to a dispute between the two cities that was later resolved with a compromise to place completion of SR 520 ahead of the bus lane.

The state government approved funding for the Redmond project in 1977, extending SR 520 by 2.65 miles (4.26 km) at an estimated cost of $10 million (equivalent to $40 million in 2024 dollars), funded using part of a statewide gasoline tax increase of two cents per gallon. Contract bidding for the last segment was halted in 1978 by a lawsuit filed by a group of Eastside residents in opposition to the freeway, claiming that its environmental impact had been improperly assessed. U.S. District Judge Morell Edward Sharp ruled in favor of the state government in March 1979, allowing for the bid to be awarded to a contractor. The segment was opened to traffic on December 18, 1981. The SR 920 designation was removed from the state highway system in 1985, and the section was re-signed as part of SR 520. A traffic signal at the intersection of SR 520 and Northeast 51st Street remained in place until 1986, when it was replaced with an interchange.

=== Freeway widening and new interchanges ===
The completion of SR 520 spurred new development in Downtown Redmond and the Overlake area, contributing to major traffic congestion on the freeway. In 1994, the state government approved $81.1 million (equivalent to $155 million in 2024 dollars) in highway improvements for the SR 520 corridor, including lane expansions and the addition of HOV lanes. The segment from West Lake Sammamish Parkway to SR 202 was widened from two to four lanes in September 1995, and included the construction of a new bridge across the Sammamish River. In late 1996, the highway's terminus at SR 202 was converted from a signalized intersection to an interchange, including an overpass connecting to Avondale Road. SR 520's HOV lanes between I-405 and West Lake Sammamish Parkway were opened in 1999 after a $40 million (equivalent to $71 million in 2024 dollars) expansion project. The new lanes were restricted to two persons per vehicle, while the older HOV lanes between I-405 and the Evergreen Point Floating Bridge had a three-person requirement. A new interchange was built at Northeast 40th Street in 2000 to serve the Microsoft Redmond Campus and other nearby employers, along with a set of collector–distributor lanes through the area, and ramp meters to manage traffic flow. Between 1994 and 2002, portions of a multi-use pedestrian and bicycle path on the north side of the freeway were completed and opened, forming a 4.5-mile-long (7.2 km) trail from northern Bellevue to Marymoor Park in Redmond.

In the late 2000s, WSDOT completed several highway improvement projects on the segment of SR 520 between West Lake Sammamish Parkway and SR 202 in Downtown Redmond. In August 2008, a flyover ramp from westbound SR 202 to westbound SR 520 was opened to traffic, replacing a pair of onramp traffic signals. SR 520 was widened to four lanes in each direction in 2010, in a multi-phase project that added HOV and merge lanes, as well as reconstructed ramps at West Lake Sammamish Parkway. In addition to the Downtown Redmond projects, a new lid-like overpass at Northeast 36th Street in Overlake was opened in 2010 to improve traffic in the area. The overpass's $30 million cost (equivalent to $42 million in 2024 dollars) was funded mostly by Microsoft, along with contributions from the City of Redmond and federal stimulus funding.

Additional projects were funded by the Connecting Washington funding package, which was approved by the state legislature in 2015. An additional ramp is being added to the 148th Avenue Northeast interchange in Overlake, connecting eastbound traffic to the Overlake Village area via a set of new streets and an underpass. It began construction in 2021 and was opened in December 2023 at a cost of $68 million. The package also funded $40.9 million to engineer and acquire land for an expanded interchange at 124th Avenue Northeast in Bellevue to serve the Spring District.

=== Bridge replacement and corridor improvement program ===
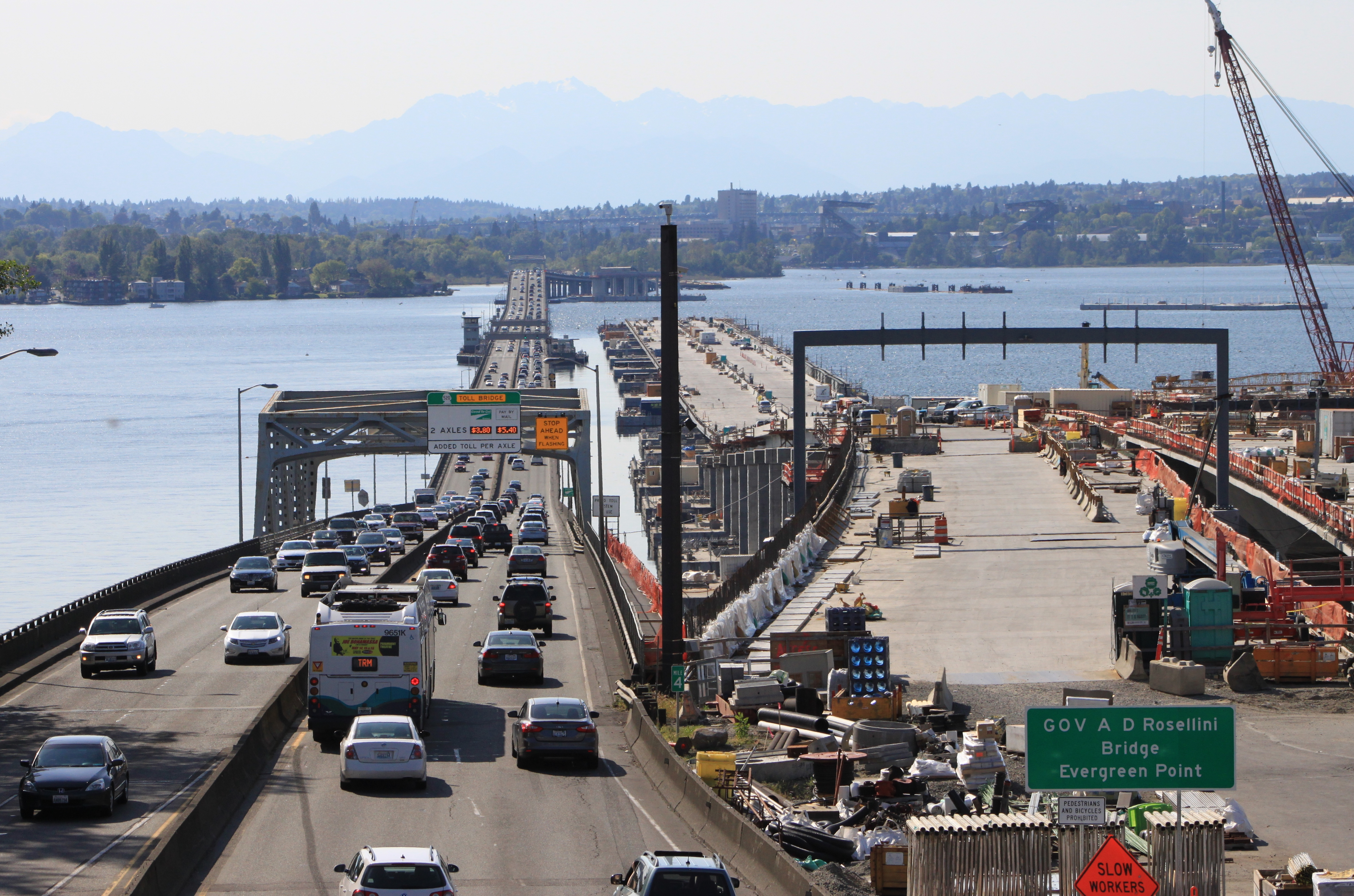
The original Evergreen Point Floating Bridge (left) and its under-construction replacement (right), seen in 2015 from the east approach

Since the opening of the Evergreen Point Floating Bridge in 1963, several proposals from local governments have requested the construction of a parallel span or additional pontoons to increase capacity and add infrastructure for rapid transit and bicyclists. Daily traffic crossing the bridge rose from 17,400 cars in 1964 to nearly 100,000 in 1987, making the bridge the worst traffic bottleneck in the state of Washington. By the late 1990s, the bridge was carrying twice as much traffic as it was designed to handle, and calls from Eastside cities and companies for a replacement bridge intensified. WSDOT engineers also determined that sections of the bridge would fail during a large earthquake or a major windstorm, and that the bridge was nearing the end of its life expectancy, necessitating a total replacement. The bridge underwent a major rehabilitation in 1999, including a seismic retrofit, and increased resistance to stronger sustained winds, to extend its life expectancy to 20 to 25 years.

The Washington State Transportation Commission began seeking alternatives for the bridge replacement project in 1997, including a Sand Point crossing and various designs for a parallel replacement span. The non-bridge elements of the project on the Eastside would be centered on lidding the freeway; a proposal to build a lid over the entire section between Lake Washington and I-405 was rejected due to its projected cost of $2 billion. In 2003, the alternatives were narrowed to a replacement span, with varying lane widths and configurations for interchanges in Seattle. WSDOT chose the project's preferred alternative, a replacement span with six lanes and a mixed-use trail, in 2011. The $5.69 billion megaproject, which encompasses the SR 520 corridor between I-5 and I-405, was funded using a state gas tax and electronic tolls on the floating bridge introduced on December 29, 2011, to repay construction bonds over a 40-year period.

Construction of the SR 520 corridor project began in April 2011 on the Eastside, where WSDOT expanded the freeway to six lanes and added HOV lanes. The project, completed in 2014, also included the construction of new bus stations and direct access ramps, new interchanges, park lids covering SR 520, and a multi-use trail. Construction of the new floating bridge began in 2012, and it was dedicated on April 2, 2016, as the longest floating bridge in the world. The westbound lanes opened on April 11 and the eastbound lanes were opened on April 25. The new, 116-foot-wide (35 m) bridge features four general purpose lanes and two HOV lanes, as well as a multi-use trail on its north side that opened on December 20, 2017. Demolition of the former bridge was completed in early 2017. The western approach was partially replaced with a new bridge for westbound traffic in August 2017, with the eastbound lanes temporarily remaining on the old approach bridge. As part of the project, several "ghost ramps" in the Washington Park Arboretum for the cancelled R.H. Thomson Expressway were demolished in 2017, despite calls to preserve them in memory of the protests that cancelled the projects in the 1960s. A park with one preserved set of columns is planned to be constructed in the 2030s, but remains unfunded by Seattle Parks and Recreation.

Improvements to the remaining segment of the SR 520 corridor, between I-5 and the floating bridge, were initially left unfunded, but underwent design and environmental review. In 2015, the state legislature approved $1.64 billion in funding for the "Rest of the West" program, which will be constructed between 2018 and 2029. The first phase of the program, planned to be completed by 2024, included construction of the eastbound lanes of the western approach bridge and a new Montlake Boulevard interchange with HOV lane ramps, a relocated bus station, and a park lid. The eastbound approach to the floating bridge was opened to limited traffic in July 2023 and expanded to carry three lanes in its permanent configuration the following month. The HOV access ramps to Montlake Boulevard were opened in September 2024.

The second phase, to be constructed between 2020 and 2031, will include a new bridge across Portage Bay, a park lid near Roanoke Park, and a new HOV lane ramp to the I-5 reversible express lanes. The express lane ramp, planned to cost $68 million, was expected to open in early 2024, but it was later delayed to 2030 due to the inability to increase transit service on the corridor. The Portage Bay bridge and Roanoke lid are expected to begin construction in late 2024 and be finished in 2031, in tandem with the express lane ramp, at a cost of up to $1.4 billion. The third phase is a planned second bascule bridge over the Montlake Cut that parallels the existing Montlake Bridge to increase vehicular capacity.

== Mass transit ==
The SR 520 corridor is served by Sound Transit Express Route 545, as well as other Sound Transit Express, King County Metro, and Community Transit bus routes. The corridor averaged about 24,500 weekday riders in 2016, using 700 bus trips on 18 routes. During peak periods, buses travel on SR 520 every one to four minutes between the Evergreen Point Floating Bridge and I-405.

Sound Transit began Link light rail service along the Redmond portion of the SR 520 corridor in April 2024, with the opening of the 2 Line to Redmond Technology station. Approved by voters in 2008, the line connects Redmond Technology station at Northeast 40th Street and Overlake Village station at 152nd Avenue Northeast to Seattle and Downtown Bellevue, crossing Lake Washington on the I-90 floating bridge. The line was extended along SR 520 to Downtown Redmond in 2025, using funding from the Sound Transit 3 program approved by voters in 2016. The rebuilt floating bridge was also designed to accommodate a future light rail extension, requiring supplemental pontoons and new approaches.

== Exit list ==
The entire highway is in King County. All exits are unnumbered.

| Location | mi | km | Destinations | Notes |
|---|---|---|---|---|
| Seattle | 0.00 | 0.00 | I-5 – Portland, Vancouver, BC | Western terminus |
| Seattle | 0.20 | 0.32 | Roanoke Street / Harvard Avenue | Westbound exit only |
| Seattle | 0.94 | 1.51 | Montlake Boulevard (SR 513) – University of Washington | Last eastbound exit before toll |
| Seattle | 1.63 | 2.62 | Lake Washington Boulevard | Eastbound entrance only |
| Lake Washington | 1.63– 3.98 | 2.62– 6.41 | Evergreen Point Floating Bridge | |
| Medina | 4.14 | 6.66 | Evergreen Point Freeway Station | Bus only |
| Hunts Point | 4.57 | 7.35 | 84th Avenue Northeast | Eastbound exit and westbound entrance |
| Clyde Hill | 5.39 | 8.67 | 92nd Avenue Northeast | Westbound exit and eastbound entrance; last westbound exit before toll |
| Clyde Hill | 5.15 | 8.29 | Yarrow Point Freeway Station | Bus only |
| Bellevue | 5.97 | 9.61 | Lake Washington Boulevard Northeast / Bellevue Way | Eastbound exit and westbound entrance; former SR 908 |
| Bellevue | 6.29 | 10.12 | 108th Avenue Northeast | No eastbound exit (except HOV) |
| Bellevue | 6.94 | 11.17 | I-405 – Renton, Everett | |
| Bellevue | 7.50 | 12.07 | 124th Avenue Northeast | Eastbound exit and westbound entrance |
| Bellevue | 9.17 | 14.76 | 148th Avenue Northeast / 152nd Avenue Northeast | Access to 152nd Avenue Northeast only through eastbound offramp |
| Redmond | 9.71– 11.21 | 15.63– 18.04 | Northeast 40th Street / Northeast 51st Street | |
| Redmond | 11.79 | 18.97 | West Lake Sammamish Parkway Northeast | Former SR 901 |
| Redmond | 12.82 | 20.63 | SR 202 (Redmond Way) | Westbound exit and eastbound entrance via Northeast 76th Street; continues as Avondale Road |
1.000 mi = 1.609 km; 1.000 km = 0.621 mi: Electronic toll collection; HOV only; Incomplete access
