= Windermere Cup =

Series of annual rowing races

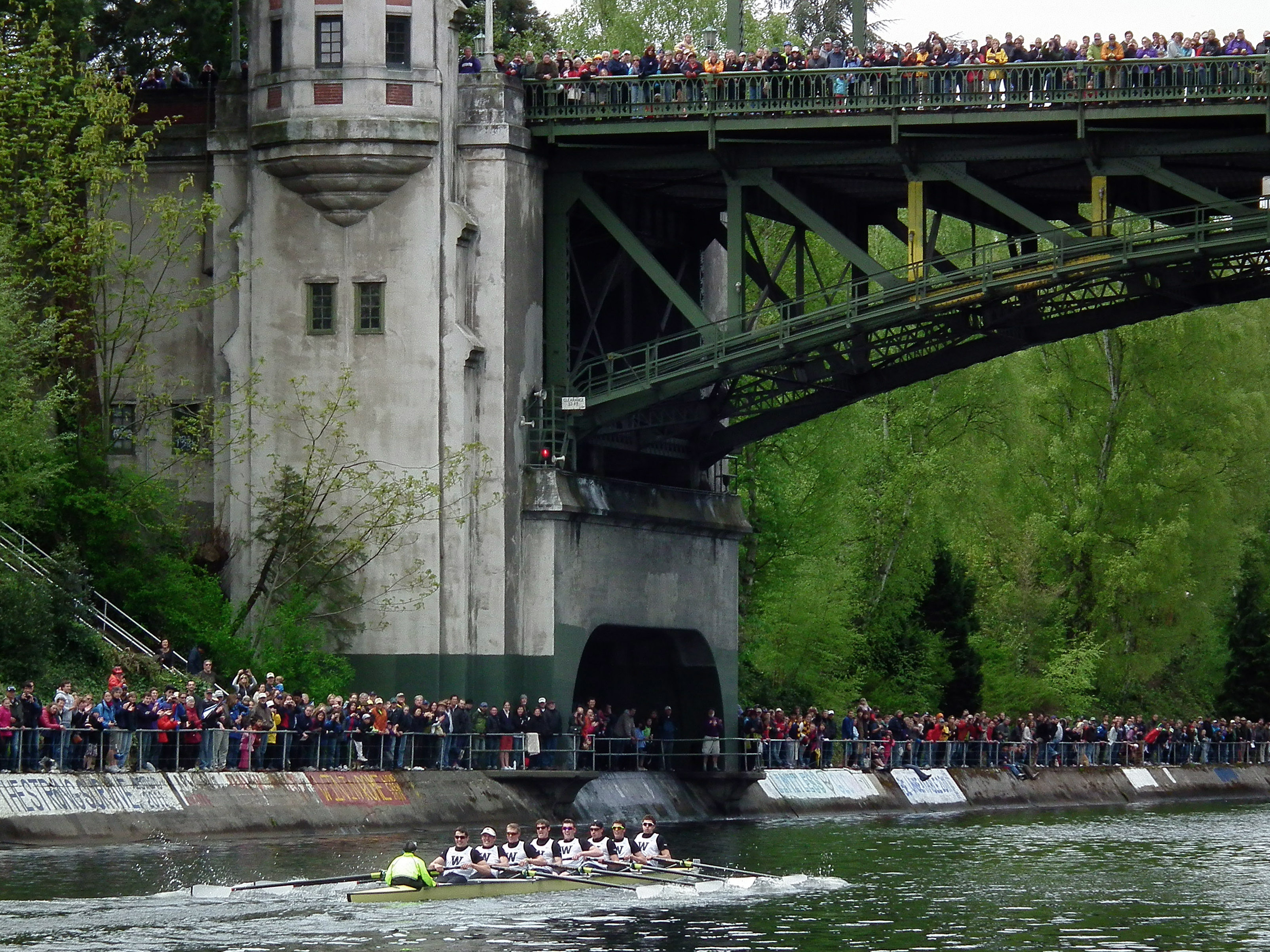
Montlake Bridge during the 2011 Windermere Cup Regatta

The Windermere Cup is a series of annual rowing races hosted by the University of Washington in Seattle, Washington, United States. The event is open to international teams and takes place on the first Saturday in May, in the Lake Washington Ship Canal around Portage Bay, the Montlake Cut, and Lake Washington. It is sponsored by Windermere Real Estate.

The regatta was sponsored by John Jacobi, former owner and CEO of Windermere Real Estate, to bring some of the top international crews to race crews from the University of Washington.

Begun in 1987 with the race won by the Soviet Union, the event draws major national and international crews each year to the Opening Day Regatta where among other preliminary events, the annual Seattle Yacht Club boat parade signals the beginning of boating season in the northwest. In 2018, some 18 races from Lake Washington through Montlake Cut to Portage Bay were held. Moorage for spectator boats is available on both sides of the course in Union Bay while thousands line both sides of Montlake Cut and stand on Montlake Bridge (closed to vehicular traffic the opening day of racing) to view both the regatta and the parade of yachts that follows. On the graphic below, the starting line is to the right in Union Bay (Lake Washington) and the 2,000 meter race is run right to left, finishing at Portage Bay (Lake Union) near West Montlake Park, adjacent to the Seattle Yacht Club's main station.

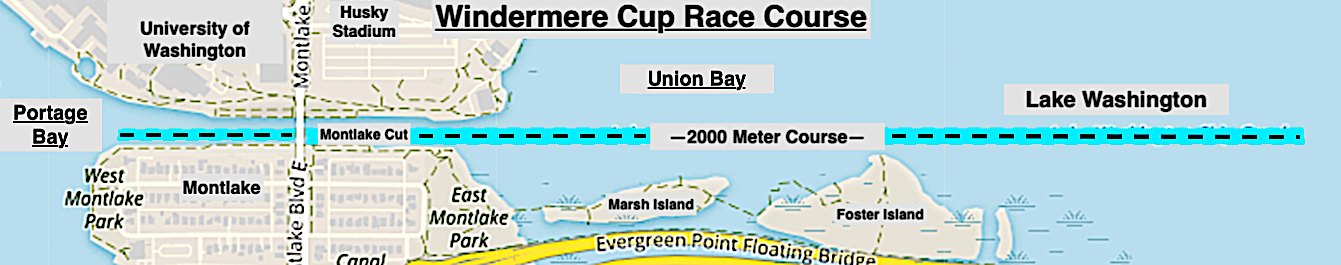
Map of the Windermere Cup Race Course

== History ==
Seattle's first Opening Day boat parade was in 1895 in Elliott Bay, and was relocated to its current location at the Montlake Cut in 1920 after the opening of Lake Washington Ship Canal and the Seattle Yacht Club's relocation to Portage Bay on Lake Union.

The Opening Day Regatta has been raced every year beginning in 1970 when the Seattle Yacht Club and the University of Washington's rowing coach Dick Erickson collaborated to add a collegiate rowing regatta to the Yacht Club's Opening Day celebration. Over the years the regatta has expanded to include junior and masters (post-college) rowers, as well as the First Responder's Cup, an annual grudge match between athletes from the Seattle Fire Department and the Seattle Police Department. Although many refer to the entire Opening Day Regatta as the Windermere Cup, the name applies only to the final two races featuring international crews.
