= Windermere Real Estate =

American real estate company

Windermere Real Estate Services
- Type: Privately held company
- Industry: Real Estate
- Founded: 1972
- Founder: John Jacobi
- Headquarters: Seattle
- Number of locations: 300
- Key people: Geoff Wood (Chief executive officer and Co-President); Jill Jacobi Wood(Co-president); OB Jacobi (Co-president); Brooks Burton (Chief Operating Officer)
- Services: Residential real estate services and investment]
- Number of employees: 7000
- Website: windermere.com

Windermere Real Estate is a real estate company founded in 1972 and based in Seattle, Washington. It is a privately held company and is the largest regional real estate company in the Western U.S., with over 300 offices and 6,500 agents.

== History ==
Windermere Real Estate was founded by John W. Jacobi in 1972, when he purchased an eight-agent office in Seattle, Washington. It grew outside Seattle in 1984 with an office on Bainbridge Island. As of 2019, Windermere had offices in Washington, Oregon, California, Idaho, Montana, Nevada, Arizona, Hawaii, Utah, Alaska, Mexico, and Colorado. All Windermere offices are locally owned and operated.

In 1989, the company created the Windermere Foundation to support low-income and homeless children and families throughout its footprint. A portion of every commission on a real estate transaction is donated directly to the Foundation in addition to other fundraisers held at office, regional, or company-wide events, including an annual Community Service Day.

In 2010, Windermere created Windermere Solutions, a web platform for agents. Windermere Solutions rebranded as MoxiWorks in 2014 and began operating independently of Windermere Real Estate. In 2015, Windermere partnered with Porch.com to integrate their data with MoxiWorks.

On March 12, 2013, Windermere announced that it would add drive times to and from work as an attribute of new home buying. According to INRIX, Windermere is the first real estate company to offer this feature. On August 9, 2013 Windermere added Search by Drive Time as a new home buyer feature to its website.

In 2016, Windermere Real Estate entered a three-year agreement to be the "Official Real Estate Company of the Seattle Seahawks". In November 2016, Windermere launched the "W" Collection, a luxury residential real estate brand for houses priced over $3 million. The "W" Collection was an extension of the company's Premier Properties program.

In 2006, D'Ambrosio & Associates Realtors joined Windermere as a subsidiary. In 2018, Windermere Real Estate acquired a 50 percent stake in West Coast Commercial Realty, a Seattle-based commercial real estate firm.

Geoff P. Wood, the son-in-law of founder John Jacobi, became president of the Windermere Real Estate Company in 1999. He was promoted to CEO in 2003 and became co-president in 2007. Jill Jacobi Wood, daughter of John Jacobi, was appointed President of Windermere Real Estate Company in 2003. In 2009, OB Jacobi, John Jacobi's son, was appointed co-president. As of 2007, John Jacobi served as chairman of the board for Windermere Real Estate Company after ceasing participation in day-to-day operations.

In 2017, Windermere appointed its first COO, Brooks Burton.

== Philanthropy and awards ==
In 1987, Windermere Real Estate sponsored the first Windermere Cup, a crew race in the Montlake Cut of the Lake Washington Ship Canal, which became an annual event. In 2002 the company began sponsoring the Cascade Cup.

In 1989, the company established The Windermere Foundation to support low-income and homeless families. The foundation won the Corporate Philanthropy Award in 2018 from the Portland Business Journal.

In 2003, Windermere launched a program called Home For The Holidays, which pays one year's rent for seven families in the Puget Sound Region.

In 1999, Windermere Real Estate received the Washington Family Business of the Year Award (Large Business) from the Pacific Lutheran University Family Enterprise Institute.

In 2008, Windermere Real Estate was named the "Top Private Company" by Washington CEO magazine. In 2013, Windermere was awarded the Succession Award from Seattle Business Magazine. In 2015, Inman nominated Windermere for their Most Innovative Real Estate Company award.
