= Roanoke Park (Seattle) =

- Roanoke Park Historic District
- U.S. National Register of Historic Places
- U.S. Historic district

- Location within Washington (state)
- Location: Bounded by Shelby St. on the N., Roanoke St. on the S., Harvard Ave on the W., 10th Ave. on the E., Seattle, Washington
- Coordinates: 47°38′35.9″N 122°19′12.7″W
- Area: 18.3 acres (7.4 ha)
- Built: 1899
- Architect: Green, Elmer E.; et al.
- Architectural style: Late 19th And 20th Century Revivals, Bungalow/craftsman
- NRHP reference No.: 09000578
- Added to NRHP: July 30, 2009

Roanoke Park is a 2.2-acre (0.89 ha) park between the north Capitol Hill and Portage Bay neighborhoods in Seattle, Washington. It occupies the block bounded by E. Edgar and Roanoke Streets on the north and south and 10th Avenue E. and Broadway E. on the east and west, just northeast of the junction of State Route 520 and Interstate 5.

The park was named by David T. Denny and Henry Fuhrman after Roanoke, Virginia. It was bought by the city of Seattle in 1908.
