= Montlake, Seattle =

- Seattle Neighborhood
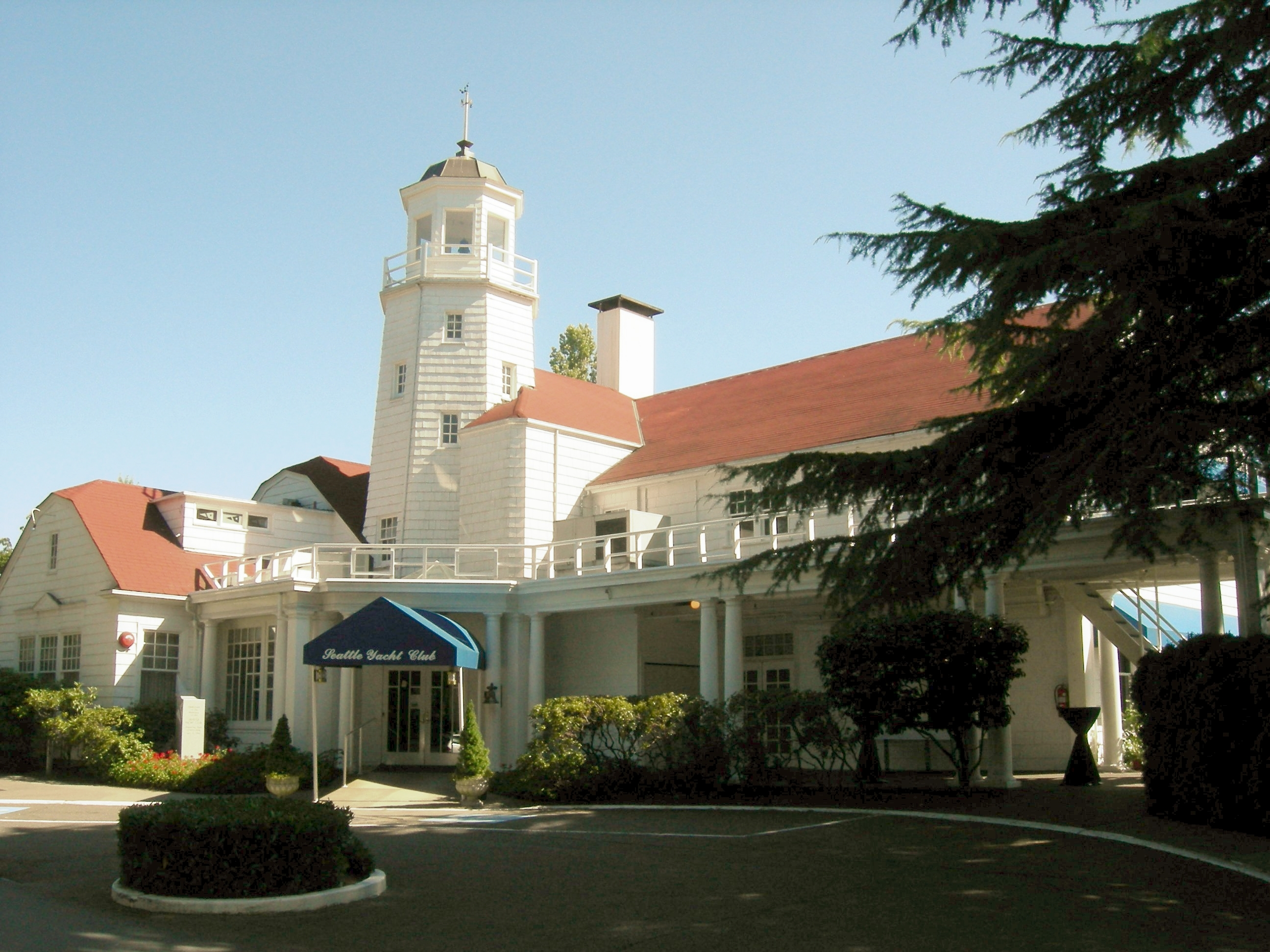
- The Seattle Yacht Club in the Montlake neighborhood is on the National Register of Historic Places.

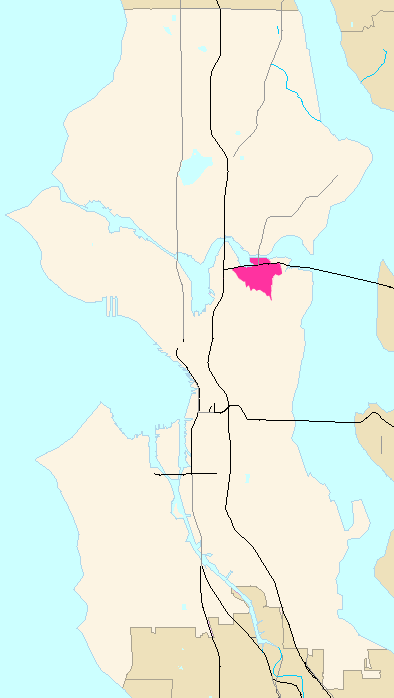
- Montlake Highlighted in Pink
- Coordinates: 47°38′33″N 122°18′19″W
- Country: United States
- State: Washington
- County: King
- City: Seattle
- Time zone: UTC−8 (PST)
  - Summer (DST): UTC−7 (PDT)
- ZIP Code: 98112
- Area Code: 206, 564

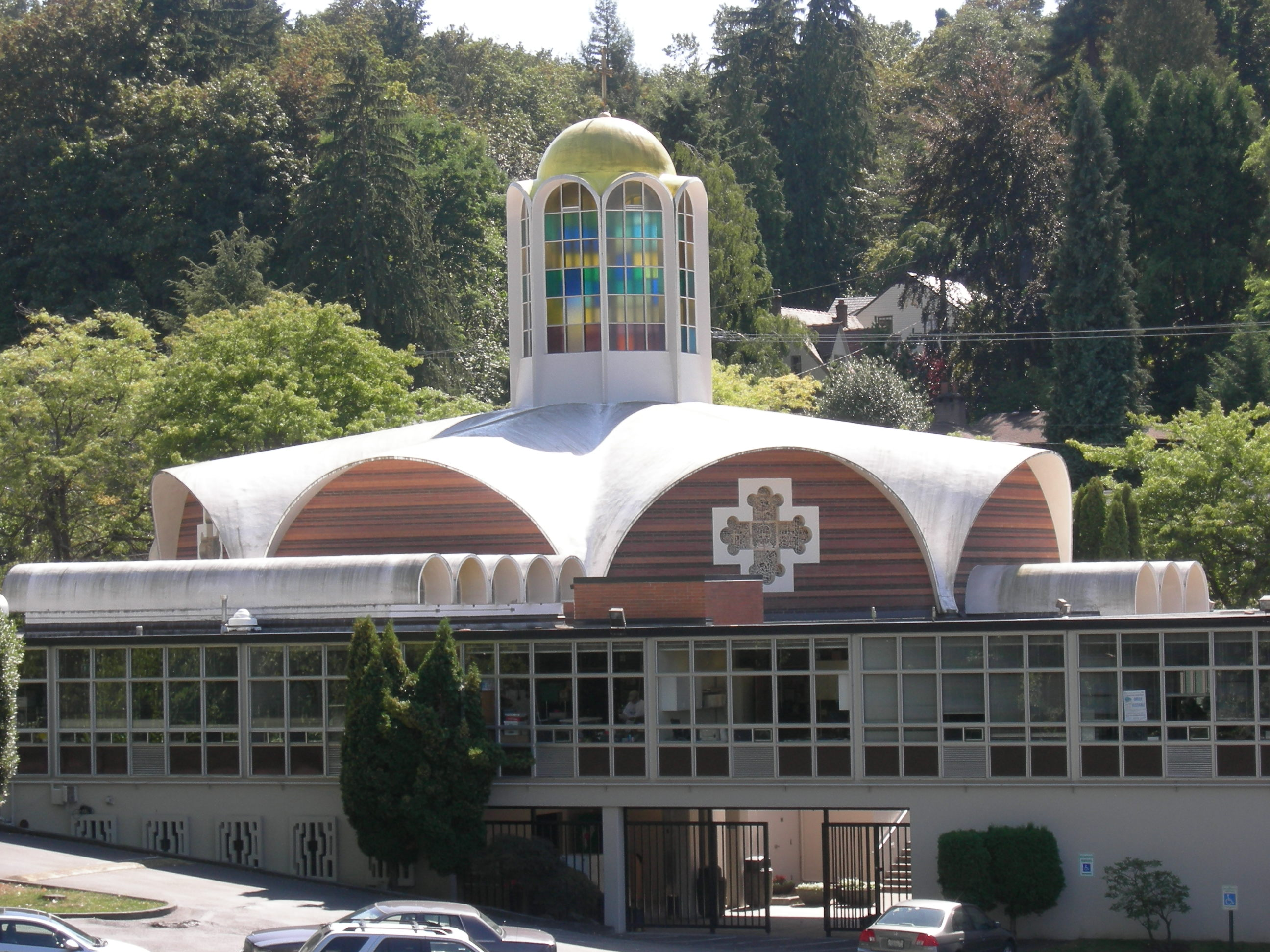
St. Demetrios Greek Orthodox Church

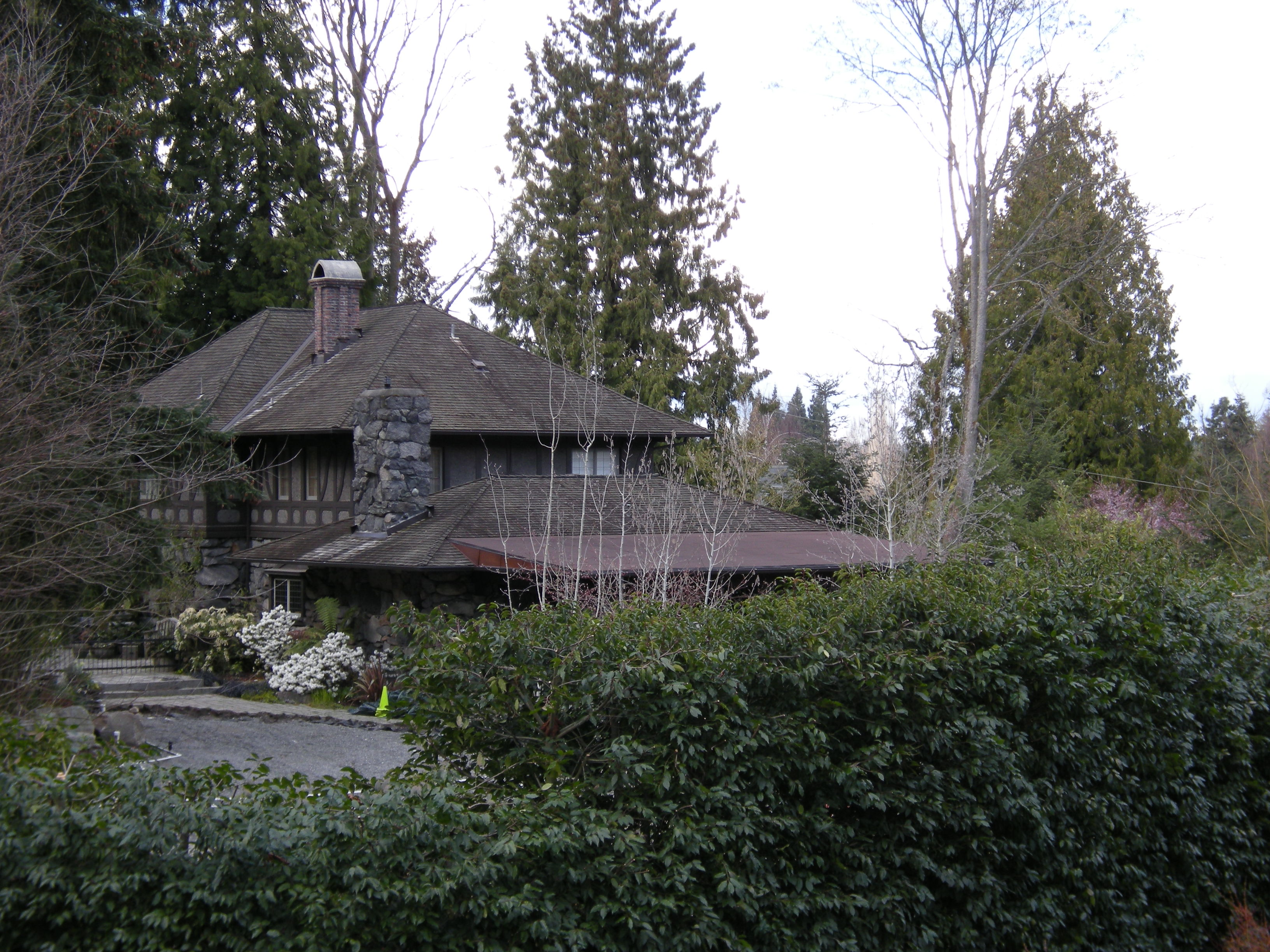
Home on Boyer Avenue

Montlake is a wealthy residential neighborhood in central Seattle, Washington. It is located along the Montlake Cut of the Lake Washington Ship Canal, bounded to the north by Portage Bay, to the east by the Washington Park Arboretum, and to the south and west by Interlaken Park. Capitol Hill is on its south and west sides, and the University of Washington campus lies across the Montlake Cut to the north. State Route 520 runs through the northern tip of Montlake, isolating four blocks from the rest of the neighborhood. The (unofficial) City Clerk's map of Montlake considers it to extend further west, past Interlaken Park, extending to Broadway Avenue E. and, between Lynn Street and State Route 520, all the way to Interstate 5.

Though sports at the University of Washington are referred to metonymically as "Montlake," UW sports facilities are not located within the traditional bounds of the neighborhood; instead, they are located on Montlake Boulevard, across the Montlake Cut from the neighborhood.

== History ==
Montlake was primarily developed by John E. Boyer and Herbert Turner (also known as H.S. Turner) from 1903 through the early 1930s. In 1916, the northern boundary of Montlake was fixed by the opening of the New Portage Canal, later known as the Montlake Cut, between Lake Washington and Lake Union. The Montlake Bridge, a distinctive bascule bridge crossing the Montlake Cut, opened in 1925.

In 1925, a Montlake neighbor made a low offer for a tiny slice of adjoining land. Out of spite for the low offer, the builder built an 860-square-foot (80 m^{2}) house at 2022 24th Avenue E. that blocked the neighbors' open space. The house is 55 inches (1.4 m) wide at the south end and 15 feet (4.6 m) wide at the north end. The Montlake Spite House still is standing and occupied.

The Montlake Community Club, an organization of neighborhood residents, has a distinguished history of grassroots activism. (Critics have called it NIMBY-ism.) Montlake first became politically active in a failed battle to move or avoid building State Route 520 through the northern section of the neighborhood and the arboretum. The neighborhood's efforts were unsuccessful and SR 520 was opened in 1963.

The Montlake Community Club lobbied to halt planning of the R.H. Thomson Expressway project of the 1960s. The expressway was to be a second north–south freeway through the city, parallel to Interstate 5 but cutting through Ravenna, Montlake, Madison Valley, and the Central District, taking out the western section of the Arboretum in the process. It was designed as a bypass around Downtown for through traffic. Interchanges with State Route 520 and I-90 were planned, the former being partially built, but the project was halted before construction went further. Never-used on- and off-ramps stood at the north end of the Arboretum until the SR 520 bridge expansion of the 2010s.

Members of the Montlake community continue to negotiate with state and local officials over planned improvements to SR 520 and other local roads. Recently, a neighborhood group called Better Bridge endorsed a proposal to expand SR 520 to six lanes, move it north, and build a lid over the existing 520 freeway to reconnect the Shelby and Hamlin blocks to the rest of the neighborhood. The proposal has been endorsed by some members of Seattle City Council but has not yet been formally approved.

Montlake saw a spike in housing prices and the demolition or renovation of several smaller homes starting in the late 1980s, as new residents bought up properties in the neighborhood because of its charm, good schools, and central location.

== Characteristics ==
The neighborhood's main thoroughfares are Boyer Avenue E. (northwest- and southeast-bound), 24th Avenue E. and Lake Washington and Montlake Boulevards E. (north- and southbound), and E. Lake Washington Boulevard (east- and westbound).

Montlake has a very small commercial corridor along 24th Avenue East. It includes the Italian restaurant Cafe Lago, Mr. Johnson's Antiques, a branch of Seattle Public Library, a small market, and dry cleaner.

The houses in Montlake are primarily single-family homes, mainly early 20th century American Craftsman bungalow and Tudor style. Also distinctive are the Old Seattle-style brick and wood frame homes of the early 20th century, particularly those bordering the Montlake Community Center.

Montlake has one church, the Greek Orthodox St. Demetrios, built in 1963 on the grounds of a former garden business called Dahlialand.

Montlake was the home of the Museum of History & Industry from 1952 to 2012 and is currently the home of the Seattle Yacht Club (1920) and the Northwest Fisheries Science Center (1931), part of the National Marine Fisheries Service.

Montlake's median household income is $208,636 according to the 2019 U.S. Census 5-Year estimate, compared to $92,263 citywide.
