= Reginald H. Thomson =

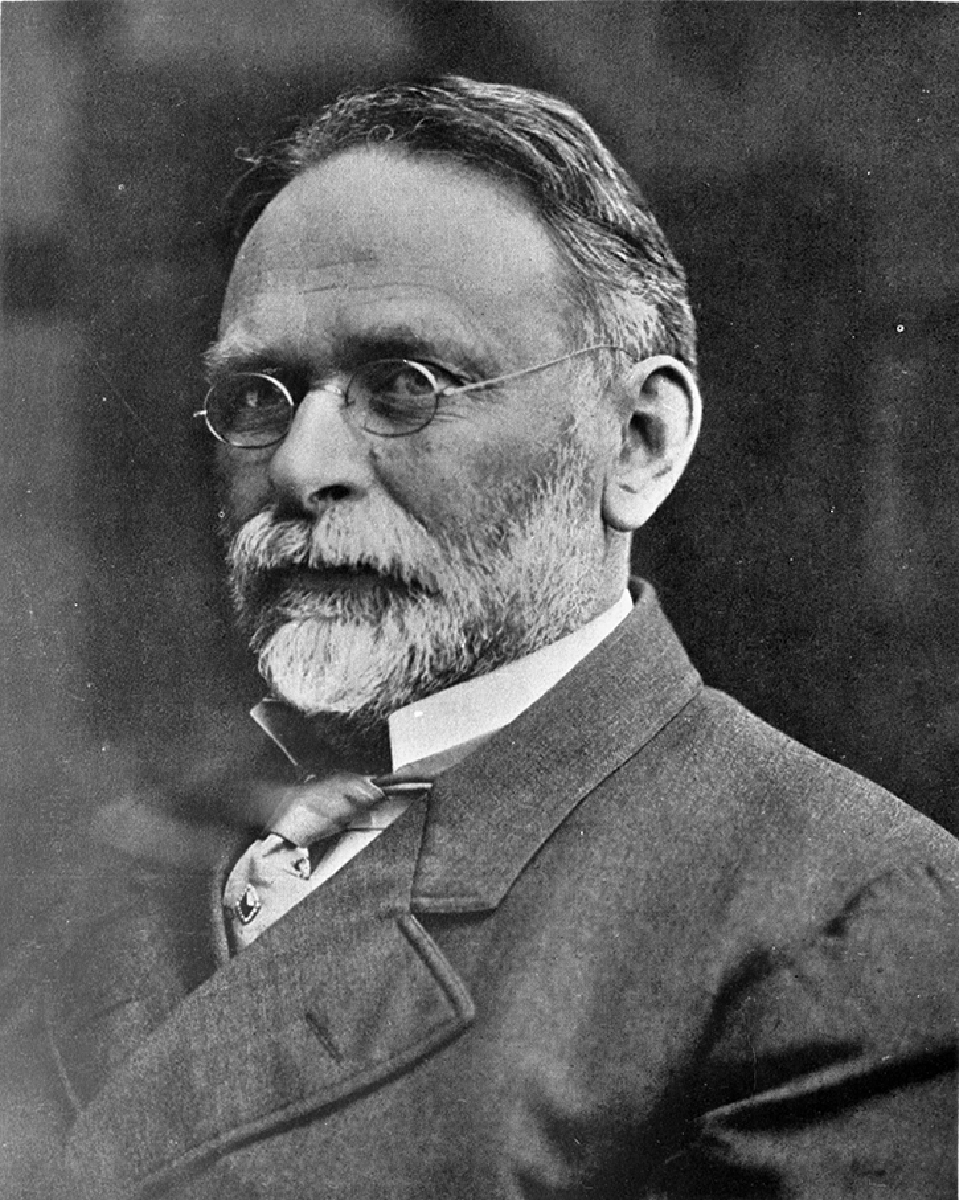
R.H. Thomson, 1905

Reginald Heber Thomson (usually R.H. Thomson; 1856 – January 7, 1949) was a self-taught American civil engineer. He worked in Washington state, mainly in Seattle, where he became city engineer in 1892 and held the position for two decades. Alan J. Stein wrote that Thomson "probably did more than any other individual to change the face of Seattle" and was responsible for "virtually all of Seattle's infrastructure".

Despite the scope of his work, no major portion of Seattle's infrastructure has ever carried Thomson's name. He was supposed to have been memorialized by the R.H. Thomson Expressway, proposed in 1960 but never built.

Among his achievements were the railway route through Snoqualmie Pass, the Lake Washington Ship Canal, much of the paving of Seattle's roads and sidewalks, numerous bridges over rivers and valleys, and major improvements to Seattle's sewer system, as well as straightening and deepening the Duwamish River and developing the Cedar River watershed, now one of Seattle's major sources of drinking water. He was also responsible for much of the regrading of Seattle, taking down hills and filling in the mudflats, and played a major role in the creation of Seattle City Light (the public electric utility), the Port of Seattle, and the Hiram M. Chittenden Locks. Elsewhere, he consulted on projects such as the Rogue River Valley Irrigation Canal, water development for Bellingham, Washington, and power plants in Southeastern Alaska.

== Early life ==
Born and raised in a "Scottish colony" in Hanover, Indiana, Thomson received three degrees from Hanover College: a Bachelors in 1877, a Master of Arts in 1901 and an honorary Ph.D., also in 1901. After his baccalaureate, he worked as a surveyor, then followed his father to Healdsburg Institute in Healdsburg, California, where his father served as principal and Thomson as a mathematics teacher.

Thomson accompanied T.B. Morris to what was then the Washington Territory, now Washington State, where Morris planned to start a coal mine. He arrived September 25, 1881, 30 years to the day after the Denny Party, usually considered the city's founders. The day of his arrival, he met pioneer David Denny at a memorial service for the recently assassinated U.S. president, James Garfield.

As an assistant to city and county surveyor F.H. Whitworth, Thomson was involved in the initial surveying and dredging of what would, years later, become the Montlake Cut of the Lake Washington Ship Canal. In 1884 he became the city surveyor, in which capacity he oversaw the building of Seattle's first sewers and the Grant Street bridge across the Duwamish River tideflats. During the period when Thomson was city surveyor, he and Whitworth also offered their services in the private sector, maintaining an office on Main Street in what is now the Pioneer Square district.

In 1886, he resigned to work for the Seattle, Lake Shore & Eastern railroad, for whom he plotted the route from the northern end of Lake Washington (now Kenmore) east through Snoqualmie Pass to Lake Keechelus. Before returning to become a consulting engineer in Seattle, he spent some time in Spokane, near the state's eastern border, where he was responsible for several railway terminals and two bridges.

In at least 1890 and 1891, he worked for the then-separate city of Ballard (now part of Seattle), planning street improvements. As during his earlier work for Seattle, he continued at this time to work in the private sector, along with George F. Cotterill, who would soon work with Thomson for the city of Seattle and later go on to be Seattle's mayor.

He applied in January 1891 for the job of King County surveyor. He was appointed in the position in May. However, after Edwin Hall Warner declined an appointment in May 1892 as Seattle city engineer, Thomson was again appointed to the city engineer position and resigned from his county position in July 1892.

== Seattle city engineer ==
=== The regrades ===
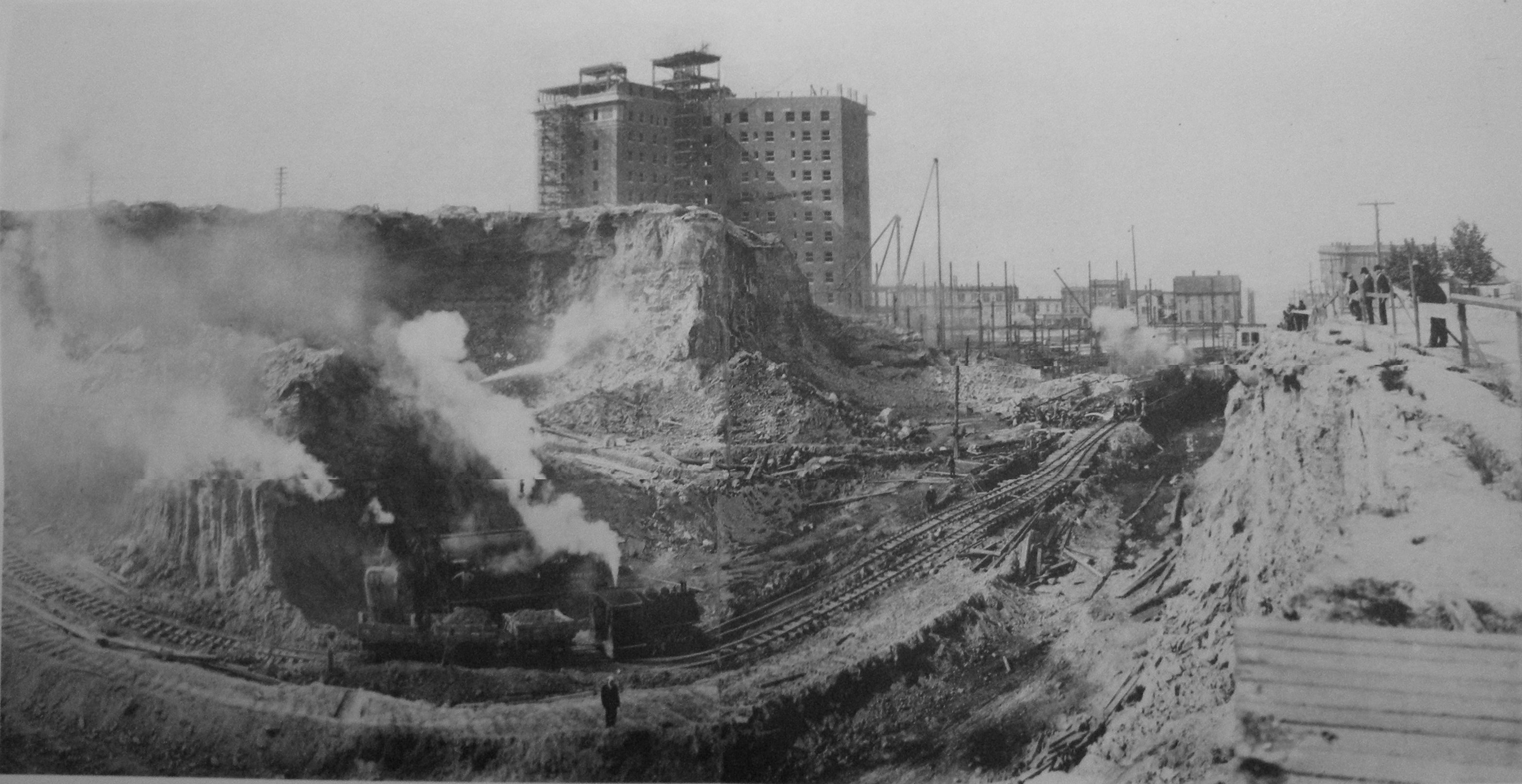
The Denny Regrade under way in 1907

Thomson became Seattle city engineer in 1892, three years after the Great Seattle Fire had destroyed more than half of the city's downtown, followed immediately by an unprecedented construction boom. He began the process of paving roads, building sidewalks, and adding sewer lines (often through areas that earlier engineers could not work out how to plumb). With his assistant Cotterill, he laid out Lake Washington Boulevard, initially conceived as a path for bicycles.

From the time of his arrival in Seattle, Thomson had considered the hilly landscape and the extensive mudflats as obstacles to the city's growth. He launched several regrading projects, most notably the extensive Denny Regrade, but also the Jackson regrade (between Main and Judkins Streets and 4th and 12th Avenues) and the regrading of Dearborn Street, with the 12th Avenue Bridge (now Jose P. Rizal Bridge) spanning Dearborn and connecting First Hill to Beacon Hill. He also drove Westlake Avenue through from Downtown to Lake Union, the first flat route connecting the two. He also worked with railroad magnate James J. Hill to get the Great Northern Railway to bypass the already crowded waterfront with a 1906 railway tunnel under Downtown.

Regrading 25 miles (40 km) of streets displaced 16 million cubic yards (12 million cubic metres) of earth, which provided fill for the Duwamish River tide-flats. The latter became Seattle's industrial zone.

=== Utilities ===
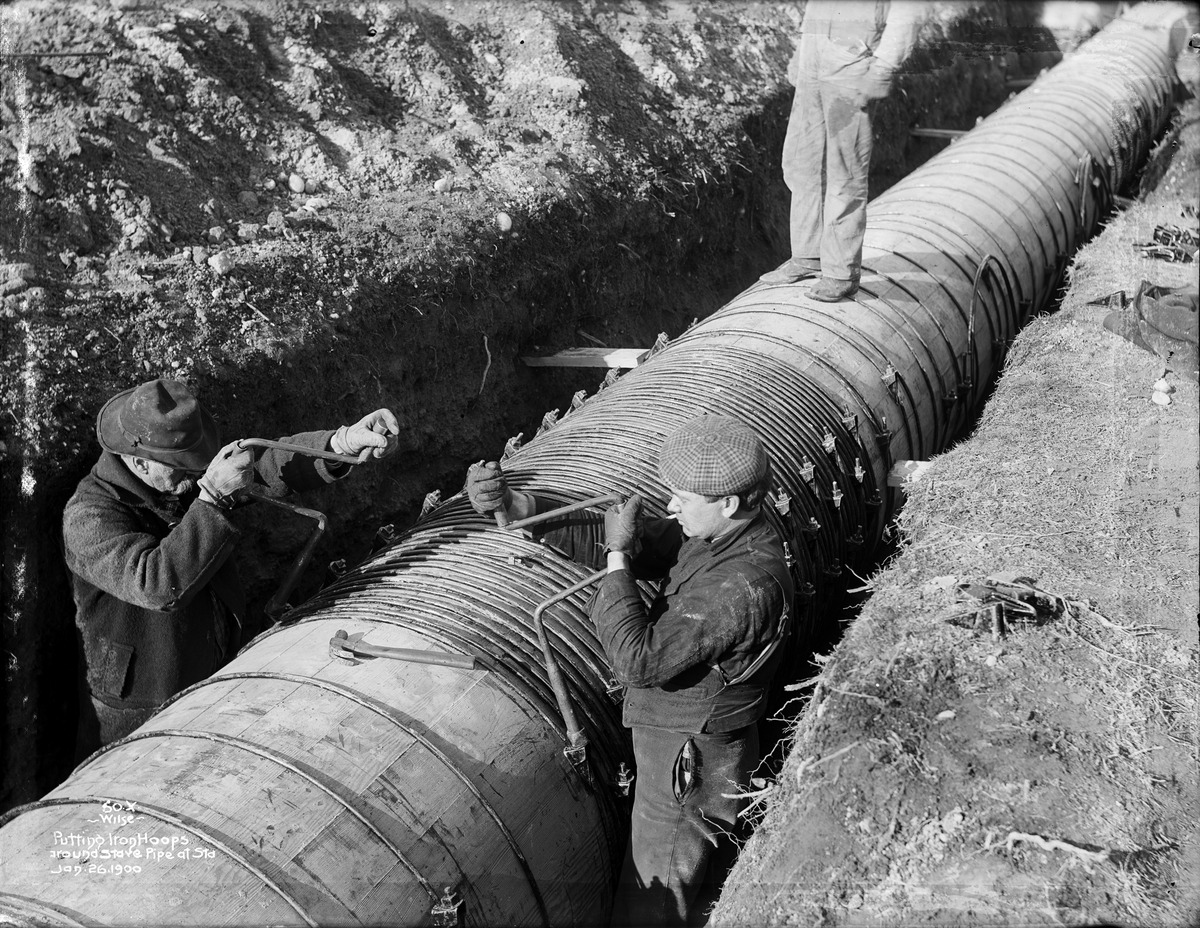
Laying the Cedar River pipeline

When Thomson became city engineer, Seattle was still pumping its water supply from Lake Washington to a reservoir on Beacon Hill. Water supply was beginning to limit the city's growth; with great difficulty, Thomson convinced the city to pipe in water from the Cedar River Watershed, 30 miles (48 km) to the southeast of Seattle in the Cascade foothills. A December 24, 1900 test of the system went so well that it went into routine use 18 days later, filling the reservoir in City Park, renamed that same year as Volunteer Park.

The Cedar River did not supply Seattle only with water: the City Light Cedar Falls hydroelectric plant began operation October 4, 1904; from January 10, 1905, Seattle had electric streetlights, and from September 9 of the same year, the city-owned utility was selling electricity to private customers.

=== Further activities ===
With the city council's encouragement, Thomson took a half-year vacation and traveled Europe. It turned out to be a working trip: he studied the infrastructures of the great European cities, and came back with further visions for the future of Seattle. Among the resulting projects were the re-routing of Seattle's sewage outlet to West Point in Magnolia, then part of Fort Lawton, now part of Discovery Park; to this day, the site contains a major sewage treatment plant.

== Later life ==
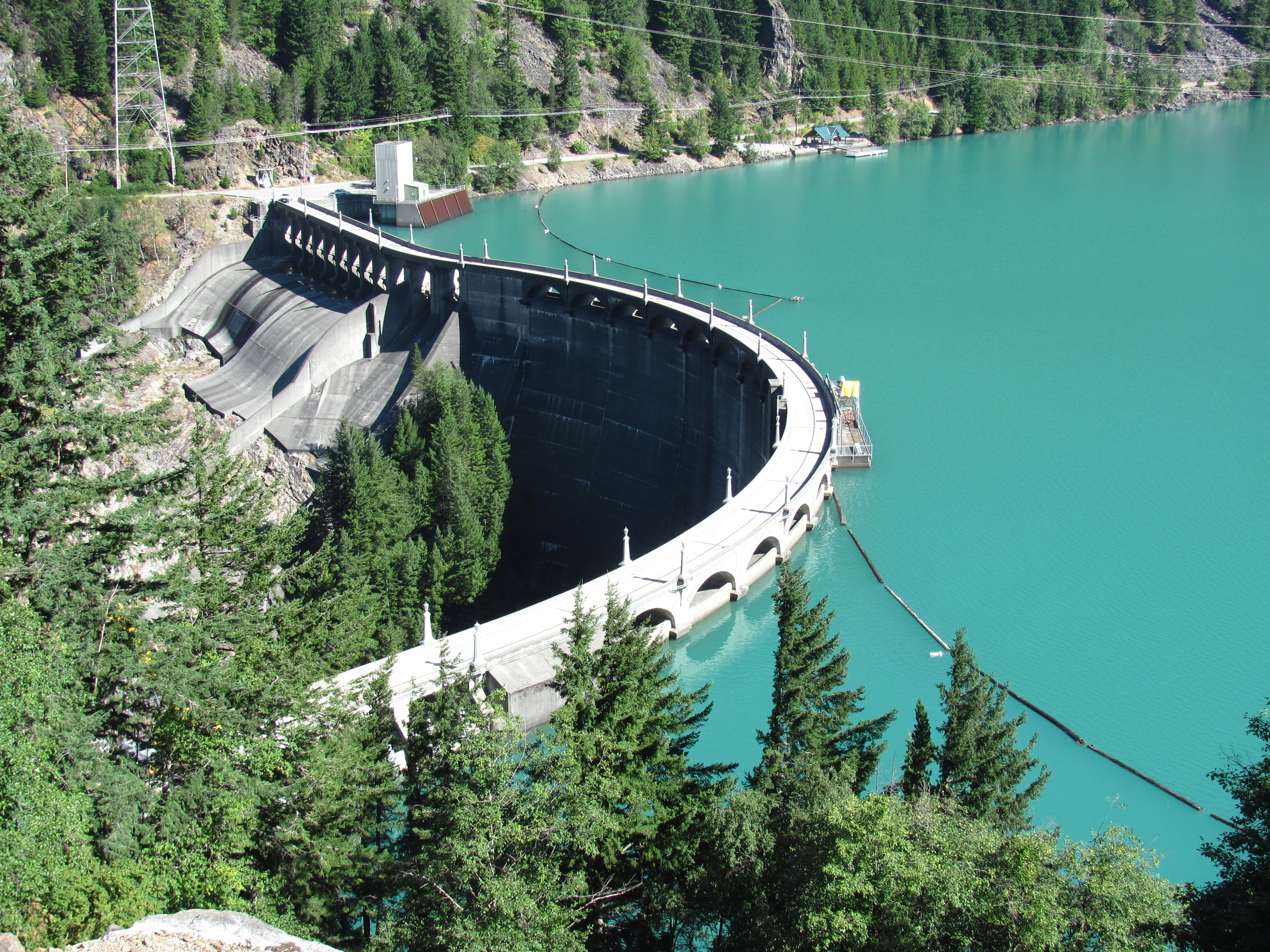
Diablo Dam, pictured here in 2010.

Overlapping his tenure as city engineer, Thomson was president of the University of Washington board of managers (1905–1915). He also became increasingly interested in Seattle's waterways, which led him to resign as city engineer in 1911 to lobby the state legislature and otherwise help organize the Port of Seattle, for which he became chief engineer. Among his achievements for the port were the acquisition of Smith Cove and the land at the foot of Bell Street which is now home to the Port's headquarters. He was also largely responsible for dredging and straightening the Duwamish River delta, and for obtaining federal money for the Ballard Locks, now the Hiram M. Chittenden Locks.

From 1916 to 1922, Thomson served on the Seattle city council, while continuing to work as a civil engineer. After leaving the council, he continued working various places in the Pacific Northwest and Alaska. He consulted on Oregon's Rogue River Valley Irrigation Canal; built hydroelectric plants in Eugene, Oregon and surveyed plant sites in Southeastern Alaska; planned the water supply of Bellingham, Washington and consulted on the system for Wenatchee; briefly, in his seventies, he returned, temporarily, as Seattle city engineer in 1930 to finish the Diablo Dam on the Skagit River after the death of city engineer William D. Barkhuff; consulted to the Inter-County River Improvement Commission for King and Pierce Counties (the counties containing Seattle and Tacoma, respectively), and consulted on the construction of the Lake Washington Floating Bridge (now Lacey V. Murrow Memorial Bridge, carrying Interstate 90 across Lake Washington) and for the foundations of the Tacoma Narrows Bridge.

At the end of his life, Thomson wrote an autobiography, That Man Thomson, which was published posthumously.

== Legacy ==
In a sense, Thomson's chief legacy is the physical contours of the city of Seattle as it exists today, including the lay of the land, the transportation system, and the municipal utilities.

Thomson was, without a doubt, Seattle's most important city engineer; in 1911 he had served in the office 19 of the 37 years it had existed. He was also often one of the most controversial: in February 1894, less than two years into his second period in the office, the Board of Public Works removed him from office; mayor James T. Ronald removed two members of the Board and reinstated Thomson. "A technical man with a streak of imagination... his disdain for those who did not share his vision also made him many enemies."

Some of Thomson's projects remain controversial to this day. The Denny Regrade, his largest regrading project, sluiced away 6 million cu yd (4.6 million m^{3}) of earth and numerous buildings, including the landmark Washington Hotel. Owners who didn't willingly sell were left with their buildings standing uselessly on pinnacles, the remaining land removed around them. The project was supposed to make way for a northward growth of downtown, but voters rejected Virgil Bogue's plan to rebuild the area in Beaux-Arts style in 1912, leaving the area to develop piecemeal. As late as the 1970s, the neighborhood was merely "serviceable but seedy", then increasingly a center of Seattle's bohemian life, while also seeing a growth in condominium and office development.

== Memorials ==
=== R.H. Thomson Expressway ===
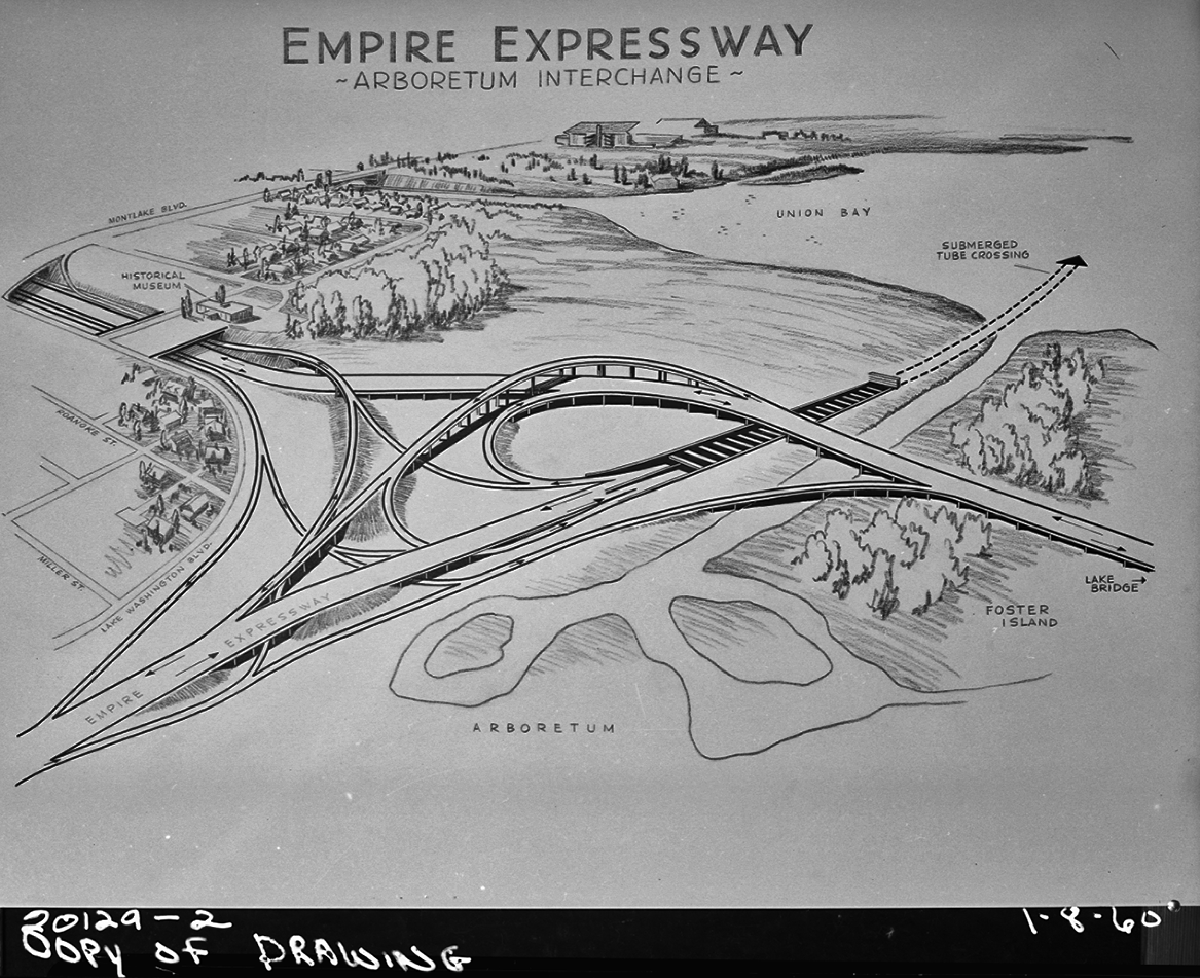
An early map of the proposed R.H. Thomson Expressway, here "Empire Expressway"

Thomson was supposed to have been memorialized by the R.H. Thomson Expressway, which was scheduled to have run north from Interstate 90, through the Central District, Montlake and the Washington Park Arboretum, under Union Bay, and through Ravenna to an interchange with a proposed Bothell Freeway. In 1972, voters rejected the project, which the City Council had definitively abandoned in 1970.

=== Broadview-Thomson Elementary School ===
Thomson is memorialized by a school: the Broadview-Thomson Elementary School (originally a junior high school) in Seattle's Broadview / Bitter Lake neighborhood.

=== Mount Thomson ===
Mount Thomson was named for him. The prominent peak is located approximately 40 miles east of Seattle in eastern King County.
