= Washington State Route 513 =

State highway in King County, Washington, US

State Route 513

- SR 513 highlighted in red

Route information
- Auxiliary route of I-5
- Maintained by WSDOT
- Length: 3.35 mi (5.39 km)
- Existed: 1964–present

Major junctions
- South end: SR 520 in Seattle
- North end: Magnuson Park in Seattle

Location
- Country: United States
- State: Washington
- County: King

Highway system
- State highways in Washington; Interstate; US; State; Scenic; Pre-1964; 1964 renumbering; Former
← SR 512	→ SR 515

State Route 513 (SR 513) is a 3.35-mile-long (5.39 km) state highway in the U.S. state of Washington, located entirely within the city of Seattle in King County. The highway travels north as Montlake Boulevard from an interchange with SR 520 and over the Montlake Bridge to the University of Washington campus in the University District. SR 513 continues past University Village before it turns northeast onto Sand Point Way and ends at the entrance to Magnuson Park in the Sand Point neighborhood.

SR 513 was created during the 1964 state highway renumbering as the successor to Secondary State Highway 1J (SSH 1J), itself created in 1937 and traveling from Downtown Seattle to Lake City. Sections of SSH 1J, including Madison Street from Downtown to Capitol Hill, date as far back as 1854. Most sections of the highway were built in the 1890s and 1900s in preparation for the Alaska–Yukon–Pacific Exposition, which took place on the University of Washington campus in 1909. SR 513 was shortened in 1971 to its present southern terminus, the interchange with SR 520 in Montlake, and to an interchange with Interstate 5 (I-5) on the Seattle–Shoreline city border. In 1991, the highway was truncated to its current northern terminus at Magnuson Park, eliminating its route through Lake City and much of North Seattle.

== Route description ==
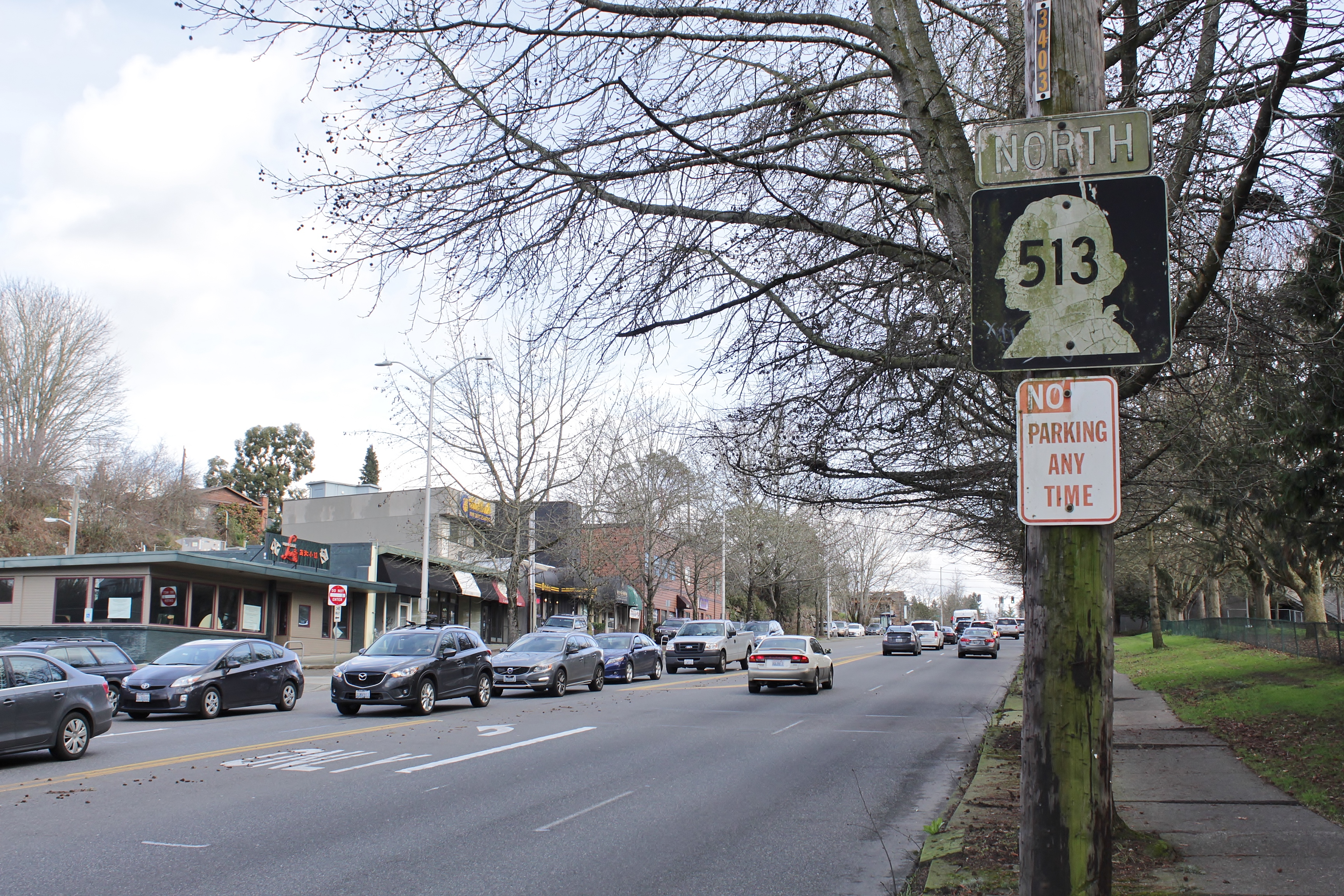
SR 513 northbound near University Village

SR 513 begins at the intersection of Montlake Boulevard and Lake Washington Boulevard in the Montlake neighborhood of Seattle, part of a partial cloverleaf interchange with SR 520. The highway travels north on Montlake Boulevard and crosses the Montlake Cut section of the Lake Washington Ship Canal on the 320-foot-long (98 m) Montlake Bridge. The bascule drawbridge is designated as a city landmark and has been listed on the National Register of Historic Places since 1982. SR 513 continues north through the University of Washington campus within the University District and passes Husky Stadium and the campus light rail station before being joined by the Burke-Gilman Trail near the Hec Edmundson Pavilion. The highway turns east onto 45th Street and Sand Point Way at the University Village shopping mall and enters the Sand Point neighborhood near Seattle Children's Hospital. SR 513 continues northeast along the Burke-Gilman Trail past the Seattle branch of the National Archives before the highway ends at an intersection with 65th Street west of Magnuson Park.

Every year, the Washington State Department of Transportation (WSDOT) conducts a series of surveys on its highways in the state to measure traffic volume. This is expressed in terms of annual average daily traffic (AADT), which is a measure of traffic volume for any average day of the year. In 2011, WSDOT calculated that the busiest section of SR 513 was within the University of Washington campus, serving 41,000 vehicles, while the least busiest section was its northern terminus at Magnuson Park, serving 14,000 vehicles. The entire route of SR 513 is part of the National Highway System, identifying it as important to the national economy, defense, and mobility.

== History ==
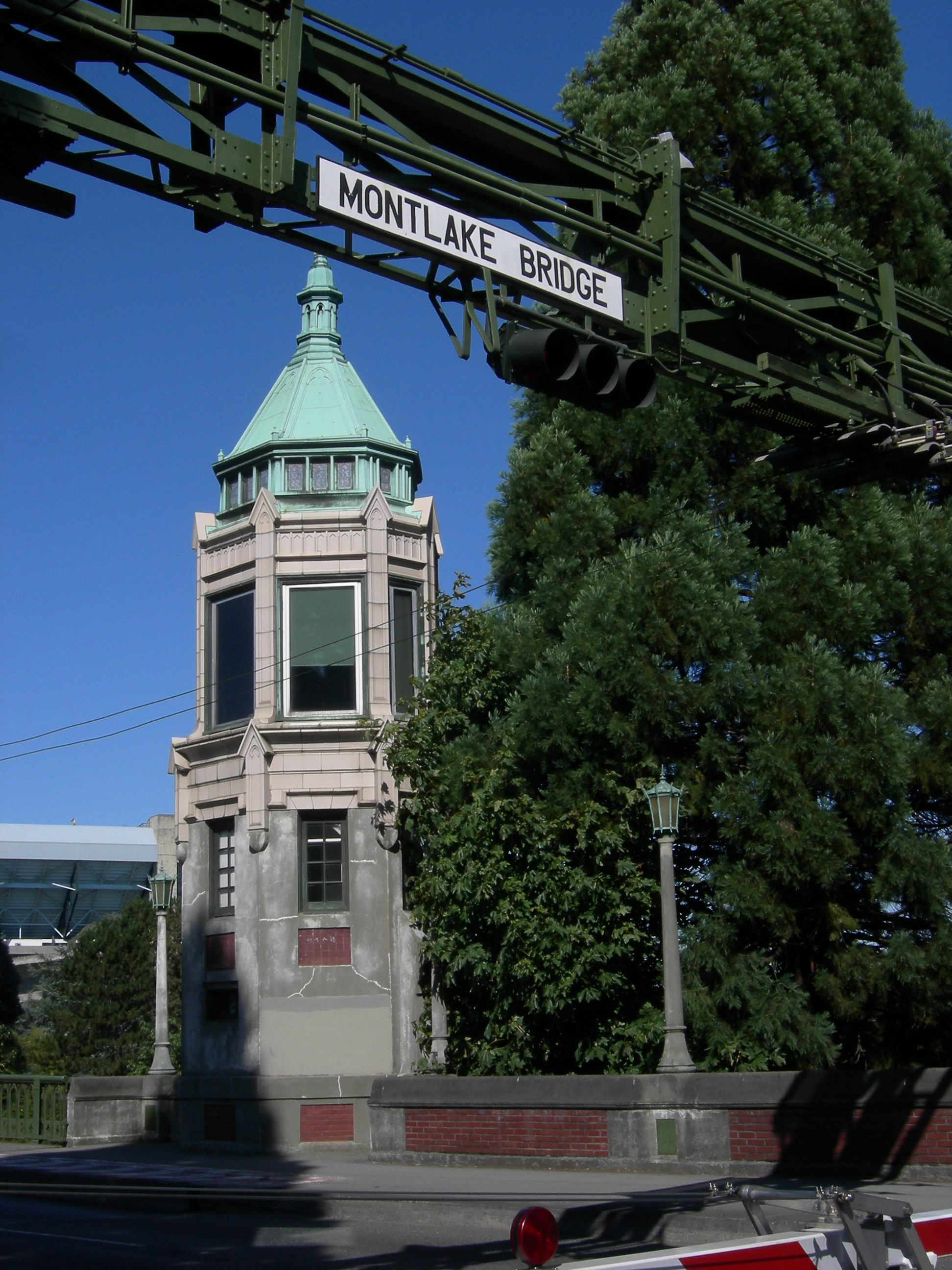
The south tower of the Montlake Bridge, carrying SR 513 and its predecessors over the Lake Washington Ship Canal.

SSH 1J, the predecessor to SR 513, was added to the state highway system in 1937 and traveled 13.40 miles (21.57 km) within the city of Seattle on streets that have existed since the 19th century. Madison Street, which carried SSH 1J from its southern terminus at U.S. Route 99 in Downtown to Capitol Hill was built in 1864 by local judge John J. McGilvra to connect his homestead at Madison Park to downtown. Other streets carrying SSH 1J, including 23rd and 24th Avenues towards Montlake, Montlake Boulevard through the University District, and Sand Point Way towards Sand Point were built during the early 1890s as the city of Seattle expanded. The rest of SSH 1J, traveling northwest from Naval Station Puget Sound at Sand Point through Lake City to US 99 on the border between Seattle and Shoreline via Roosevelt Way and 145th Street was constructed by the late 1800s to serve the University of Washington campus, site of the Alaska–Yukon–Pacific Exposition in 1909.

SSH 1J was replaced by SR 513 during the 1964 state highway renumbering and codified in 1970 on its original route, connecting Downtown Seattle to Montlake and Lake City. In 1971, SR 513 was shortened to 9.22 miles (14.84 km) by moving its southern terminus to an interchange with SR 520 in Montlake and its northern terminus to an interchange with I-5 at 145th Street. The highway was further shortened, to its present length of 3.35 miles (5.39 km), in 1991 by moving its northern terminus from I-5 to Magnuson Park at the site of the former Naval Station Puget Sound.

A project to rebuild the Montlake interchange with SR 520 began in 2019 as part of the Evergreen Point Floating Bridge megaproject, which had begun earlier in the decade. The east side of the interchange was covered by a highway lid and lanes of Montlake Boulevard were shifted over to it while the original overpass was demolished. The new overpass opened in July 2023; additional ramps to SR 520 for high-occupancy vehicles from the interchange are planned to open in 2024.

== Major intersections ==
The entire highway is in Seattle, King County.

mi	km	Destinations	Notes
0.00	0.00	SR 520 to I-5 – Bellevue, Kirkland, Portland, Vancouver B.C.	Southern terminus, interchange
0.19– 0.26	0.31– 0.42	Montlake Bridge	
3.35	5.39	NE 65th Street – Magnuson Park	Northern terminus, continues as Sand Point Way
1.000 mi = 1.609 km; 1.000 km = 0.621 mi
