= Montlake Branch Library =

Seattle Public Library branch in the U.S. state of Washington

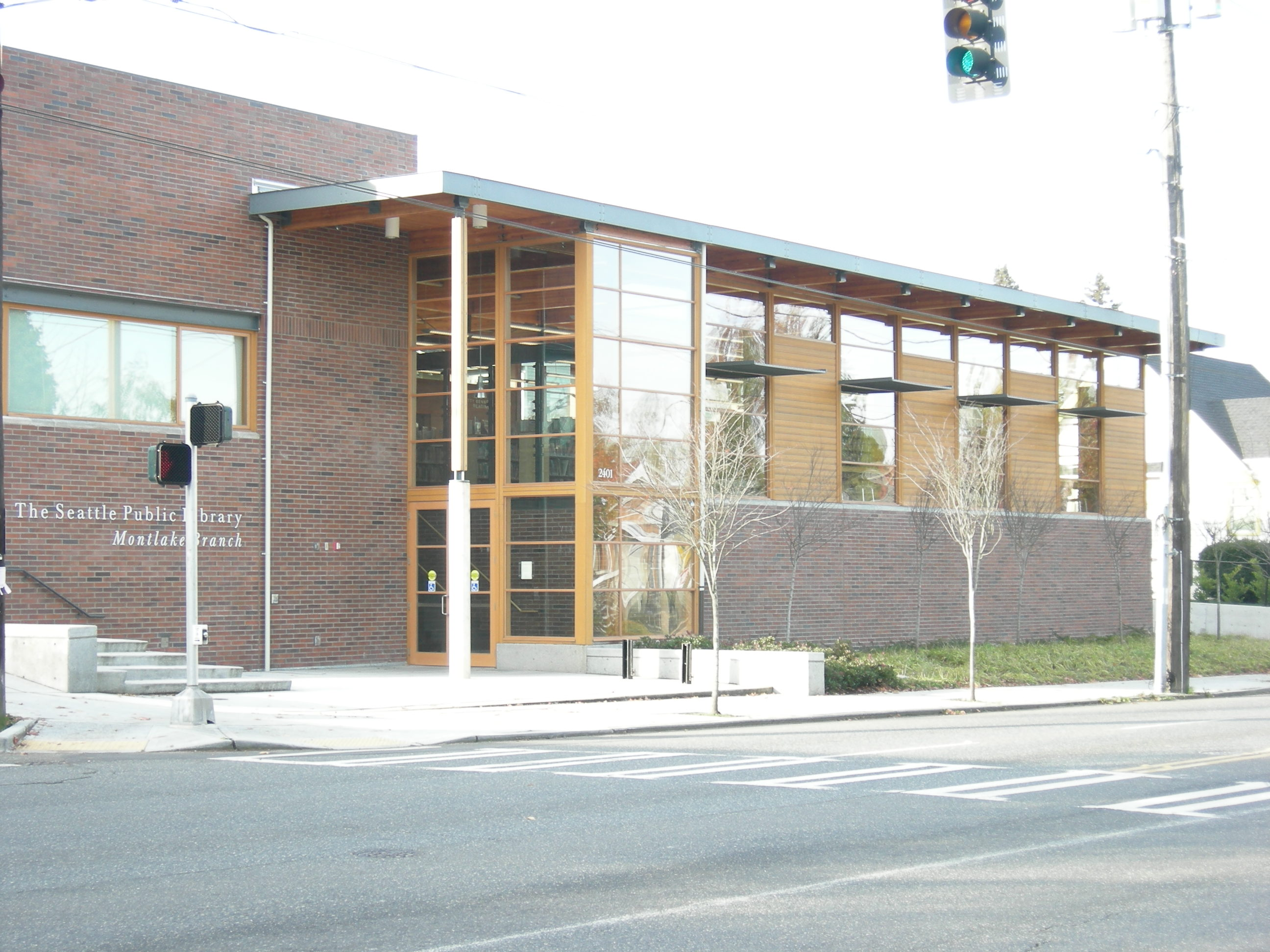
- The library's exterior in 2007
- Interactive map of the Montlake Branch Library area

General information
- Location: 2401 24th Ave E, Seattle, Washington, United States
- Coordinates: 47.6404°N 122.3025°W

Website
- www.spl.org/hours-and-locations/montlake-branch

The Montlake Branch Library is a branch of Seattle Public Library in Montlake, Seattle, in the U.S. state of Washington. The 5,650-square-foot building opened in 2006.

== Description and features ==
The interior features a "skylight aperture sundial". The sundial was developed by library staff with University of Washington astronomer Woody Sullivan.

== History ==
Construction on the current building began in August 2005.

== Awards ==
The building won two awards: American Institute of Architects (AIA) Seattle Honor Awards for Washington Architecture, Honor Award, 2008; and AIA Washington Civic Design Awards, Merit Award, 2008.
