= Montlake Bridge =

Drawbridge in Seattle, Washington, United States

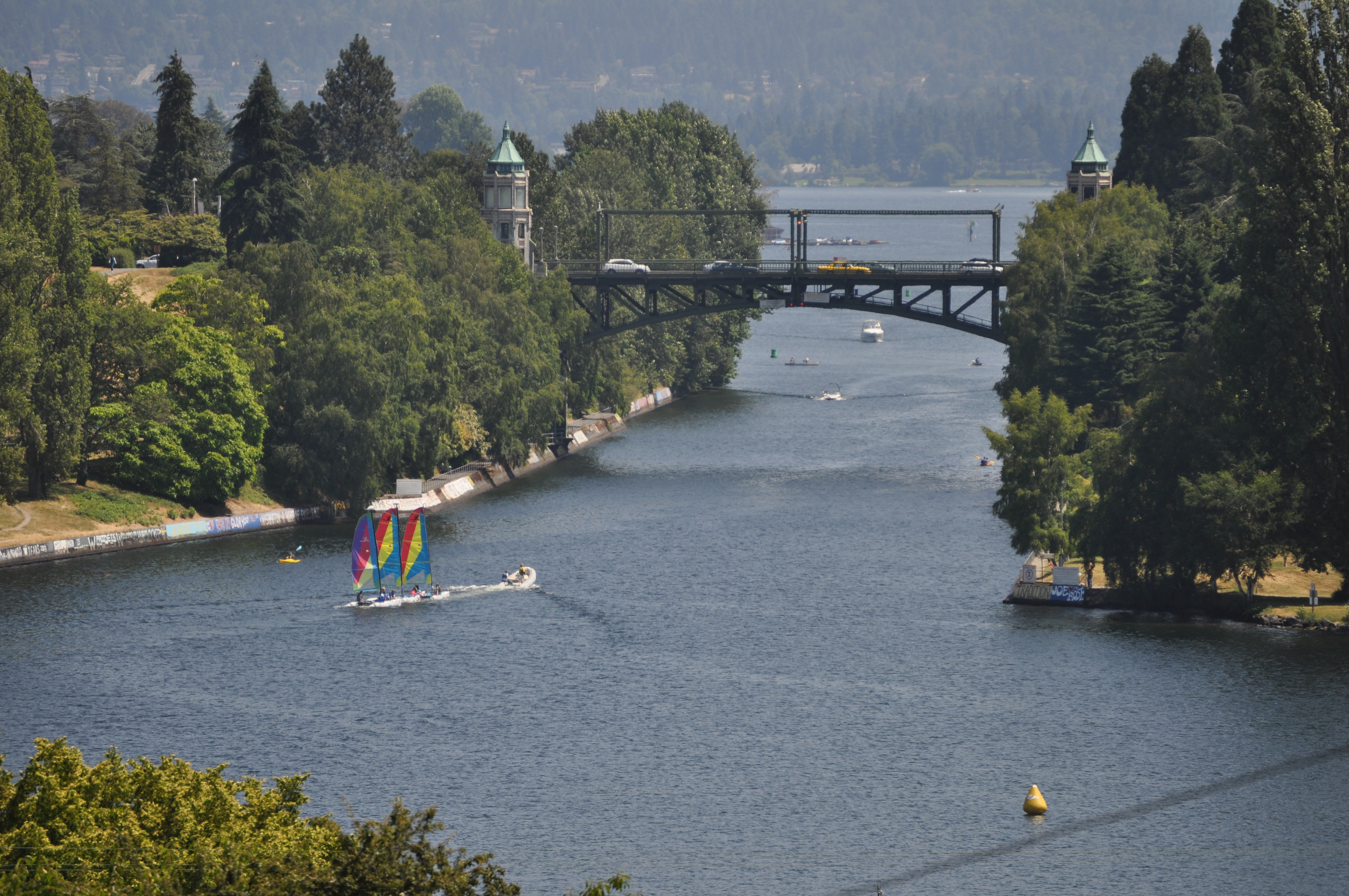
- Montlake Bridge from the west
- Coordinates: 47°38′51″N 122°18′14″W
- Carries: SR 513 (Montlake Boulevard)
- Crosses: Montlake Cut
- Locale: Seattle, Washington
- Owner: WSDOT

Characteristics
- Design: Bascule bridge
- Total length: 344 ft (105 m)
- Clearance below: 46 ft (14 m)

History
- Designer: Seattle Department of Engineering, Edgar Blair, Harlan Thomas, A. H. Albertson
- Opened: June 27, 1925

Statistics
- Toll: Free
- Montlake Bridge
- U.S. National Register of Historic Places
- Seattle Landmark
- Location: Spans Lake Union Ship Canal, Seattle, Washington
- Coordinates: 47°38′50″N 122°18′17″W
- Area: less than one acre
- Built: 1913
- Built by: Wallace Equipment Company (steel fabrication and erection)
- Engineer: J. D. Blackwell, A. Munster, D. W. McMorris
- MPS: Historic Bridges/Tunnels in Washington State TR
- NRHP reference No.: 82004242

Significant dates
- Added to NRHP: July 16, 1982
- Designated SEATL: December 13, 1979

Location
- Interactive map of Montlake Bridge

The Montlake Bridge is a double-leaf bascule bridge that carries State Route 513 (Montlake Boulevard) over Seattle's Montlake Cut—part of the Lake Washington Ship Canal—connecting Montlake and the University District.

It is the easternmost bridge spanning the canal. The bridge is 344 feet (105 m) long, and was designed by the Seattle Department of Engineering with advisory architects Edgar Blair, Harlan Thomas, and A. H. Albertson. The bridge and its control towers were purposefully designed in the Collegiate Gothic style used by architect Carl F. Gould for many buildings on the University of Washington campus. It provides a clearance of 46 feet (14 m) and is reported as providing 48 feet (15 m) of vertical clearance above the mean regulated level of Lake Washington for the central 100 feet (30 m) of the bascule span. It is one of four original bascule-type drawbridges over the Ship Canal, the others being the Ballard, Fremont, and University bridges. It was the last one to be completed, has the highest clearance of the four, and is the only one that is part of the state highway system. It is also one of six bascule bridges based on a design derived from the Chicago bascule bridge, but is unique because of its trunnion supports, employed to avoid a patent infringement lawsuit by the Strauss Bascule Bridge Company.

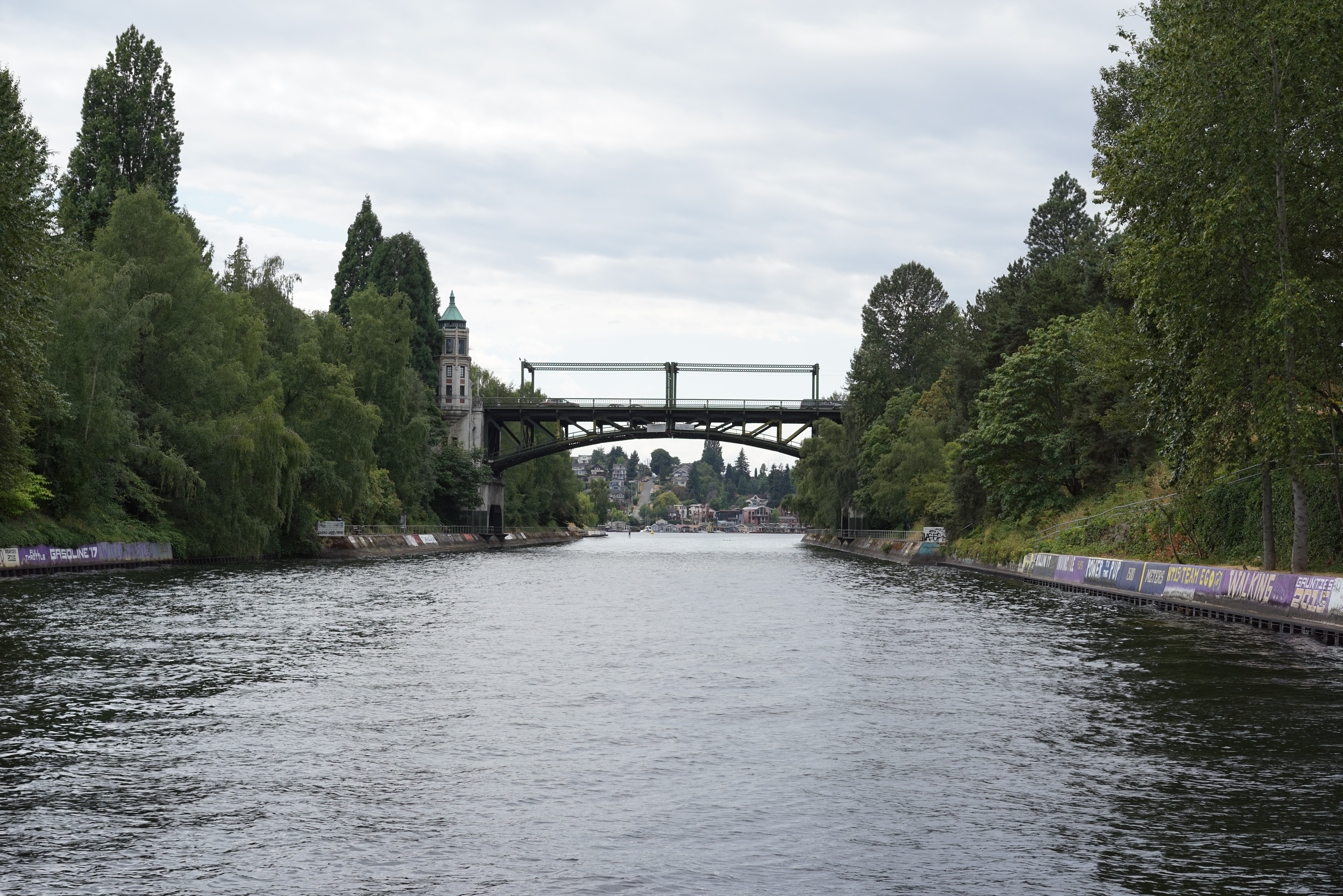
East side of the bridge as seen from Lake Washington.

== History ==
The Montlake Cut was constructed at a narrow isthmus that had been used as an east–west portage by indigenous Coast Salish people; its name in Lushootseed is stəx̌ʷugʷił ("carry a canoe"). Plans for a canal to connect Lake Union and Lake Washington emerged as early as the 1860s with the isthmus chosen as the most practical site. A north–south road across the portage was constructed in 1879, while a narrow canal was excavated perpendicular to it. A bridge was constructed over the canal and its set of locks; a larger replacement was later proposed to carry streetcars to the University of Washington campus on the north side in time for the Alaska–Yukon–Pacific Exposition in 1909. A temporary structure was built for the exposition and replaced with a suspension bridge for foot traffic in 1910 as construction on the wider and deeper Montlake Cut began.

Piers and abutments for a permanent bridge were built in 1914 as part of construction for the Ship Canal, but a serious proposal for a bridge at Montlake didn't come until 1916. The first bridge in its place was a makeshift walkway made from a series of barges, set up by graduate manager Dar Meisnest to allow football fans to cross for the Washington/Dartmouth game in 1920. The temporary bridge was so heavily traveled, it demonstrated the need for a permanent structure, which was finished in June 1925. The permanent bridge was opened on June 27, 1925, a month ahead of schedule and as the centerpiece for a local parade that drew thousands of residents. The bridge was constructed by the city of Seattle at a cost of $670,000. The steel was fabricated and erected by the Wallace Equipment Company. A. Munster, acting bridge engineer of the City of Seattle supervised the construction, J. D. Blackwell was city engineer and D. W. McMorris was assistant engineer.

From its opening in 1925 until 1940, public transit across the bridge was provided by streetcars of the Seattle Municipal Street Railway. From 1940 to 1970 and again since 1981, trolleybuses of the Seattle trolleybus system have used the bridge. Since 1984 (with the closure of the 1911 Cambie Street Bridge in Vancouver, Canada), the Montlake Bridge and the nearby University Bridge have been the only movable bridges in the Western Hemisphere still crossed by trolleybuses.

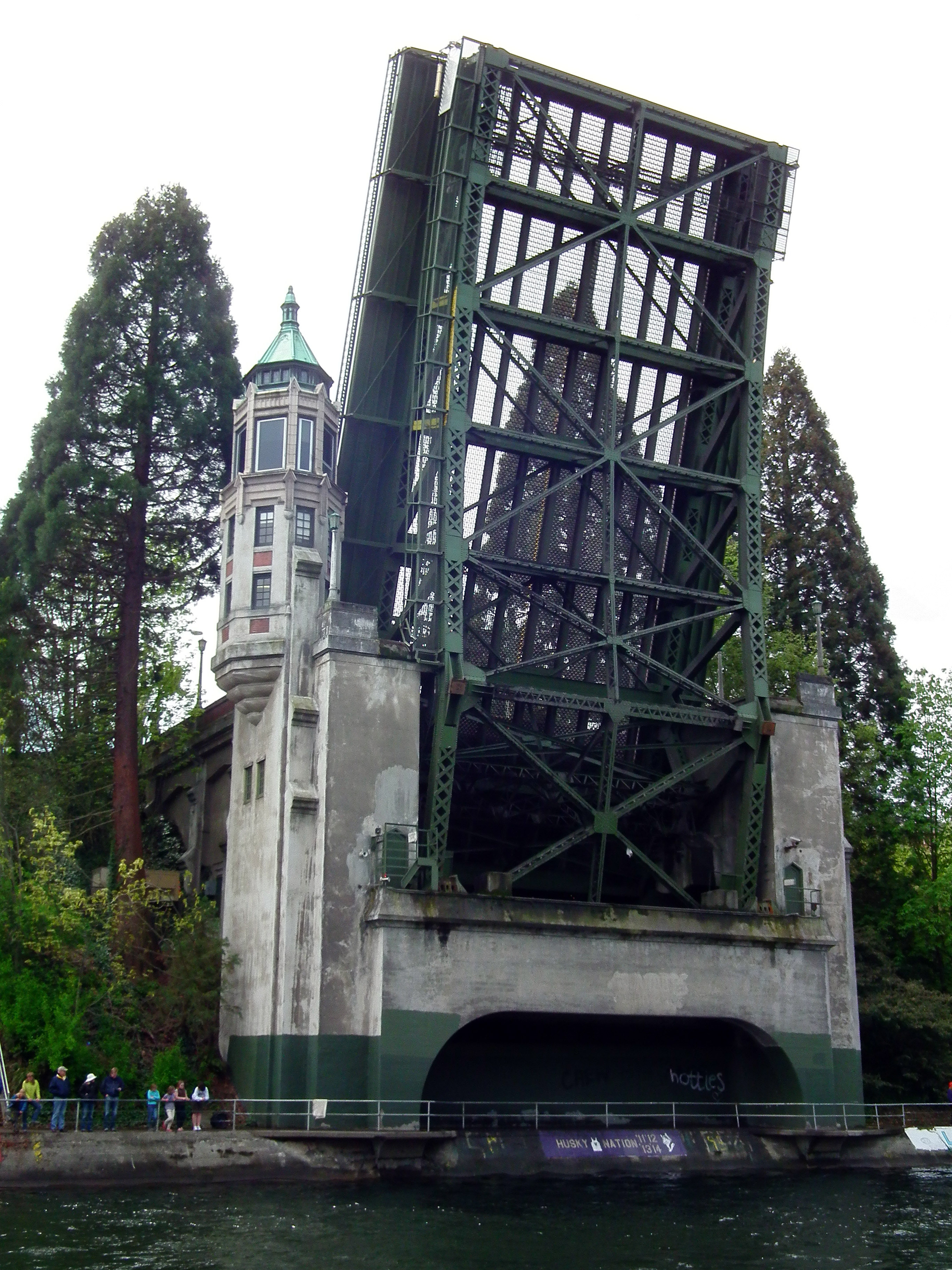
The south side of the Montlake Bridge fully open

A report from 1993 states that the Montlake Bridge averaged a volume of 60,900 vehicles each weekday, while another report from 2001 puts normal weekend traffic across the bridge at about 40,000 vehicles each day. In addition to the vehicular traffic, the bridge conveys pedestrians and bicyclists across the canal by way of sidewalks on each side of the roadway. The bridge does not open during morning and evening rush hours. It opens at designated times (usually on the hour and half-hour) during the hours just prior to and after rush periods, and on demand at other times. The bridge openings last for an average of four minutes from when traffic stops to when it resumes again. Most of the openings are for sailboats, as most of the tugs that operate this far east are able to pass under the bridge in its closed position. The bridge creates a bottleneck for traffic heading to and from State Route 520 (SR-520), and the creation of alternate routes has been proposed multiple times over the years. Traffic can become backed up for more than a mile when the bridge is open, as can be seen in aerial photographs. Plans to replace SR-520 include adding a second bascule bridge across the Montlake Cut next to the current Montlake Bridge.

=== Landmark designations ===
The Montlake Bridge is celebrated as the site of boating season's "opening day" festivities the first Saturday in May.

The bridge and the Montlake Cut together are a City of Seattle Designated Landmark (ID 107995), and the bridge was added to the National Register of Historic Places in 1982, as well as the Washington Heritage Register. It is owned and operated by the Washington State Department of Transportation.

== Navigation ==
Montlake Bridge has two traffic lights one on either side of the Montlake Cut. These traffic lights are lit for large commercial traffic and if seen red small vessels need to proceed with caution of oncoming large commercial vessel. Height restriction are listed at 48 feet (15 m) at center and 32 feet (9.8 m) all together, with a clearance width of 146 feet (45 m) and 129 feet (39 m) in the open position. This bridge can be hailed on channel 13 or using appropriate horn request, of one long and one short, for an opening. Normal bridge opening restrictions Monday through Friday except federal holidays differs here than all the rest of the drawbridges on the Lake Washington Ship Canal.

Restrictions are from 7 a.m. to 9 a.m. and from 3:30 p.m. to 6:30 p.m. from April 30 to September 1 and from 7 a.m. to 10 a.m. and from 3:30 p.m. to 7:00 p.m. from September 1 to April 30. Additionally, the draw may only open on the top and bottom of the hour from 12:30 p.m. to 3:30 p.m. and from 6:00 p.m. to 6:30 p.m. Further navigation restriction can be found within the Code Federal Regulations and the Notice to Mariners.

== Gallery ==
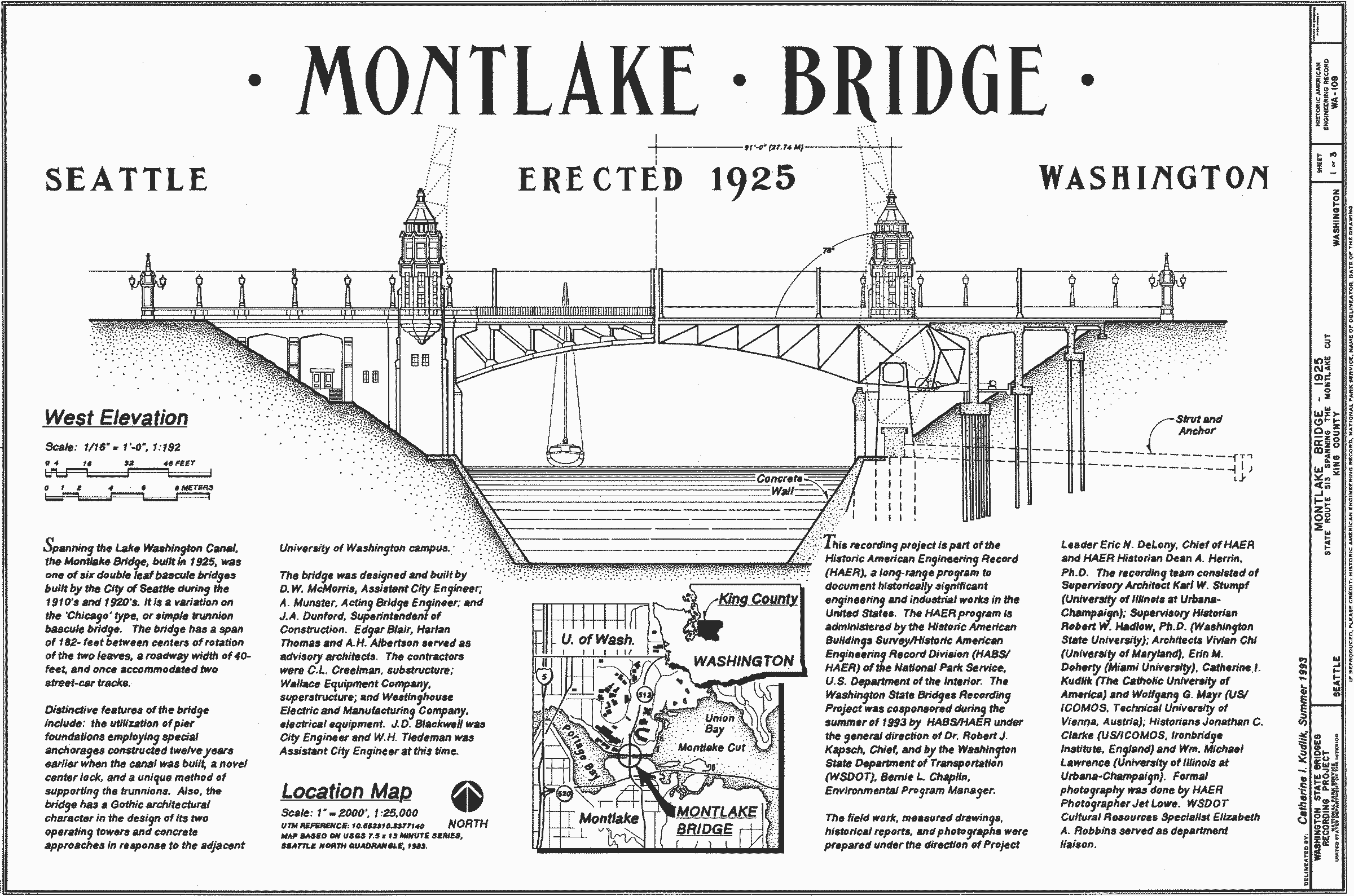
HAER description

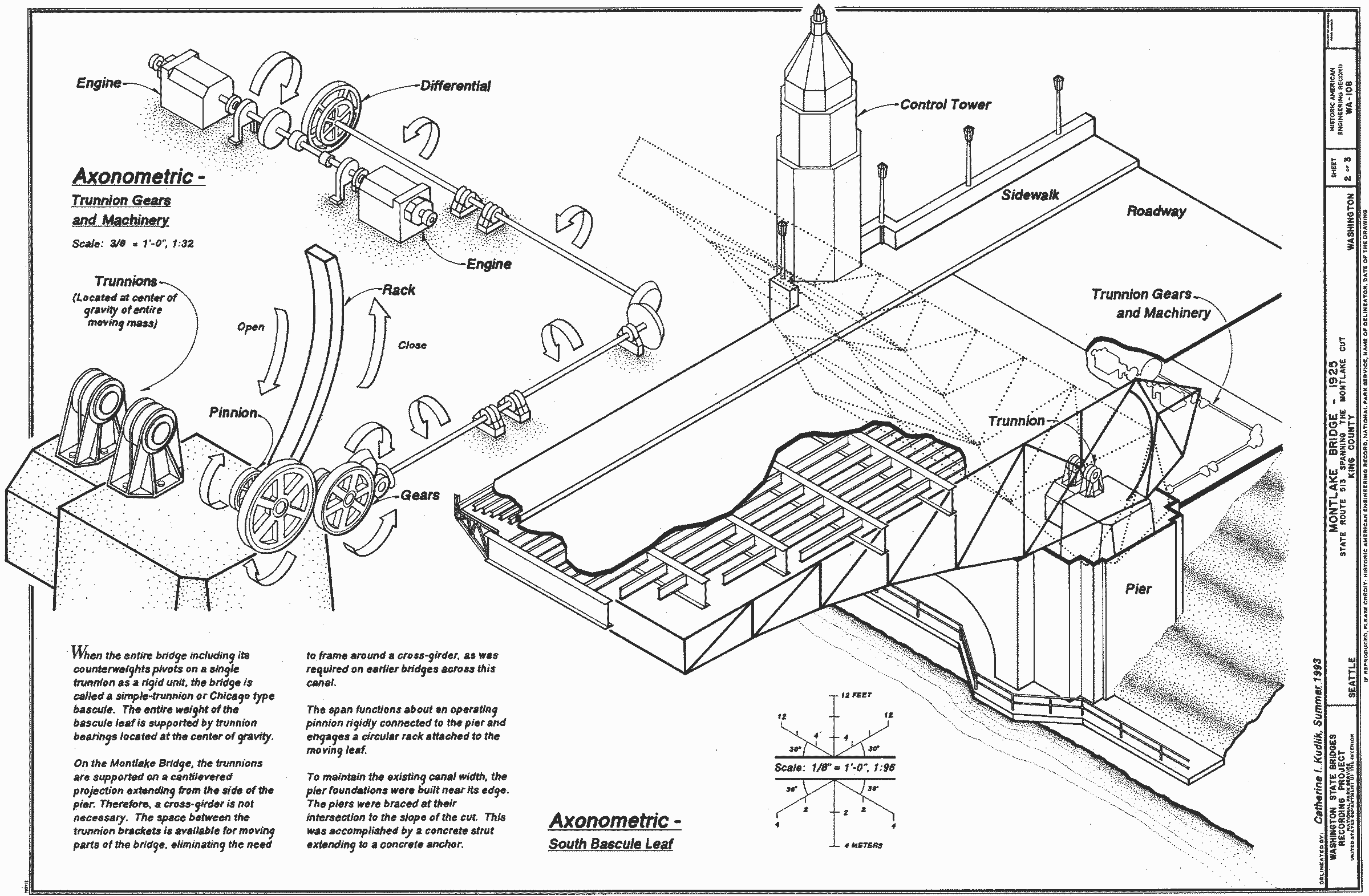
Gears and Machinery

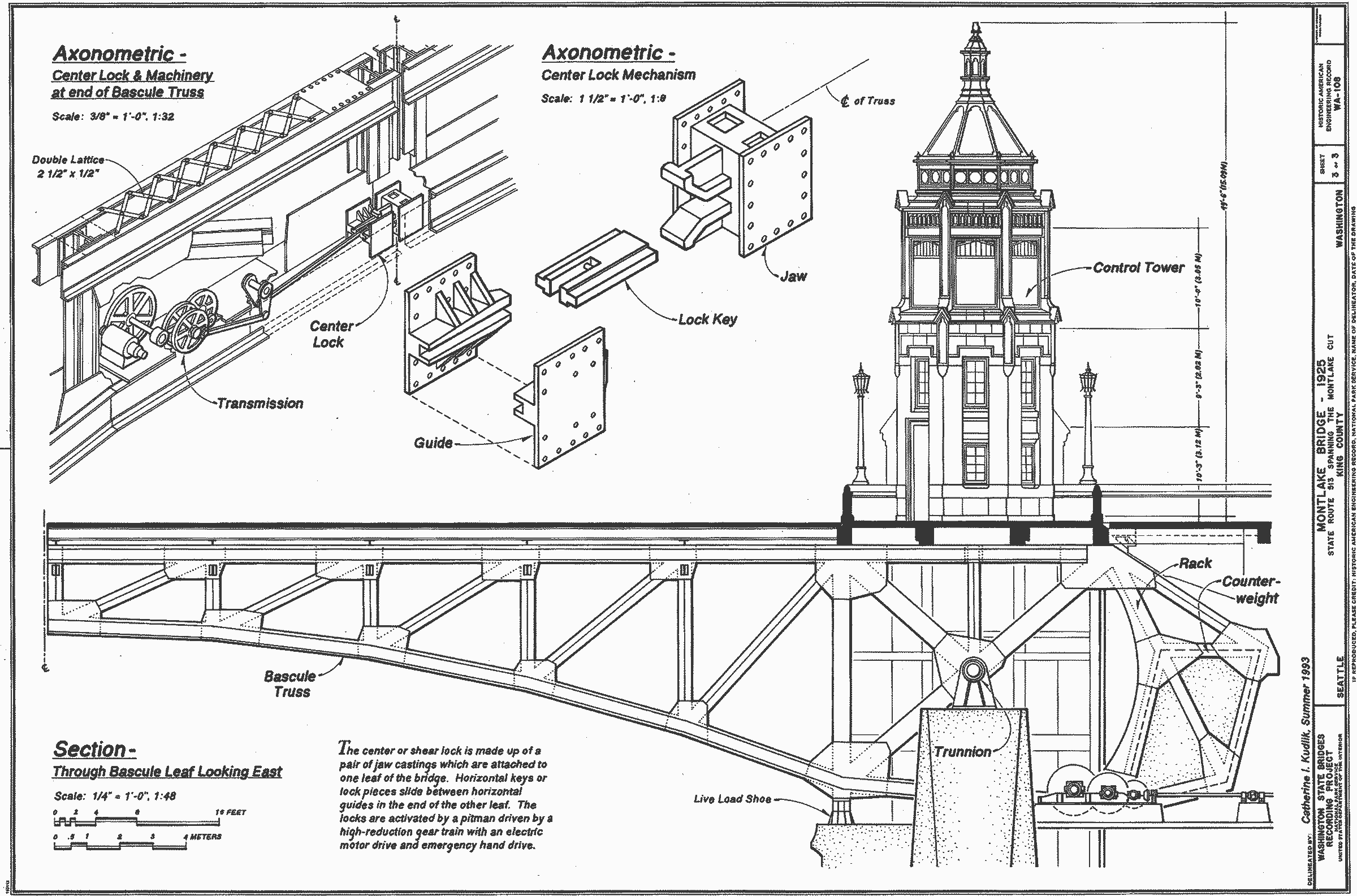
Center lock mechanism

== See also ==
- List of bridges documented by the Historic American Engineering Record in Washington (state)
- List of bridges on the National Register of Historic Places in Washington (state)
