= Montlake Cut =

Canal segment in King County, Washington, U.S.

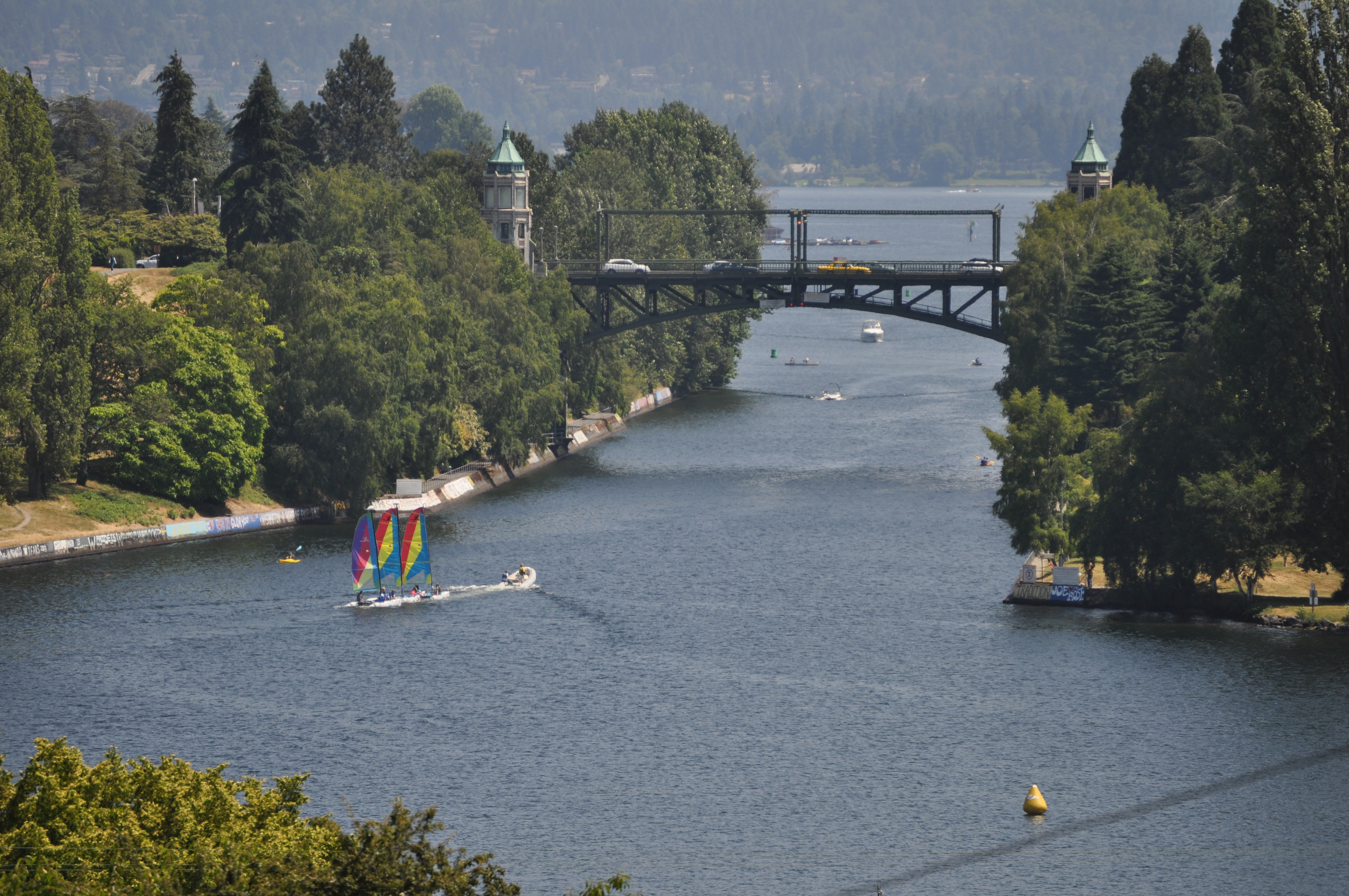
- View from west, at corner of E. Shelby St. and 10th Ave E.

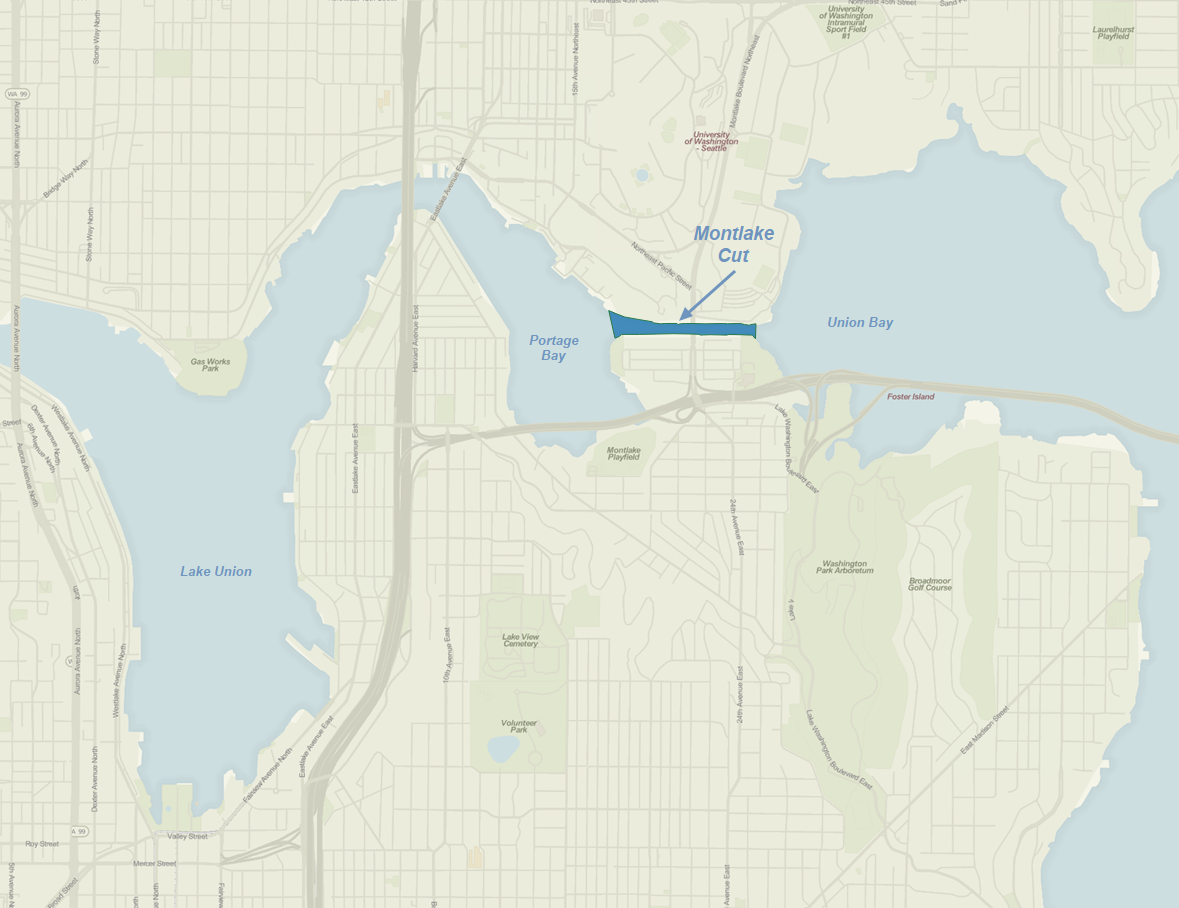
- Montlake Cut shaded in blue
- Location: Seattle, Washington
- Country: United States
- Coordinates: 47°38′50″N 122°18′15″W

Specifications
- Length: 0.47 miles (0.76 km)

History
- Current owner: City of Seattle
- Original owner: Duwamish Tribe
- Construction began: 1860
- Date completed: 1916; 110 years ago

Geography
- Start point: Portage Bay, Lake Union
- End point: Union Bay, Lake Washington

The Montlake Cut is the easternmost section of the Lake Washington Ship Canal, which passes through the city of Seattle, linking Lake Washington to Puget Sound. It opened in 1916 after 56 years of conversation and construction to create the manmade canal.

The path along the cut was designated a National Recreation Trail as Montlake Cut National Waterside in 1971.

The cut provides a connection between Union Bay, part of Lake Washington, to the east and Portage Bay, an arm of Lake Union, to the west. It is spanned by the Montlake Bridge, a bascule drawbridge carrying Montlake Boulevard (State Route 513). Most of the land on the north shore of the cut is occupied by the University of Washington, its medical school to the west and its stadium parking lot to the east; residences and a recreational trail occupy the south bank, which is part of the Montlake neighborhood.

Before the creation of the Montlake Cut, the land was regularly used by the Duwamish tribe and holds important history within the tribe that is commonly overlooked.

== History ==
Before the construction of the Montlake Cut, it was known by the Duwamish as "Carry a Canoe" (Lushootseed: sxWátSadweehL). Indigenous people had been portaging between the lakes for centuries, either carrying canoes or shoving them along an intermittent creek that appeared when Lake Washington overflowed. This creek was known as the black river and was a large source of food and transportation for the Duwamish tribe. The black river often flooded and destroyed the crops nearby; however, it was clear that its use for transportation was very advantageous. This utility sparked inspiration to create a larger-scale version of the black river that would link Lake Washington and Lake Union with Puget Sound, an idea that would benefit King County economically, allowing it to become a large shipping harbor.

Local landowners began digging a canal on their land, following the trail that the Duwamish tribe had created between the two lakes. However in 1903, after 30 years of discussion, it was decided by the Army Corps of Engineers that this plan would not be feasible because there would be a need for two locks to maintain the height of Lake Washington and Lake Union.

Ten years later, Major C. W. Kutz of the Army Corps of Engineers wished to move forward with the plan but with only one lock in Ballard. This resulted in great upset and lawsuits over the lowering of Lake Washington that would result from the excavation of the cut. On October 26, 1910, Kutz sent his assistant to set off dynamite at the head of the cut, forcing Lake Washington to be lowered.

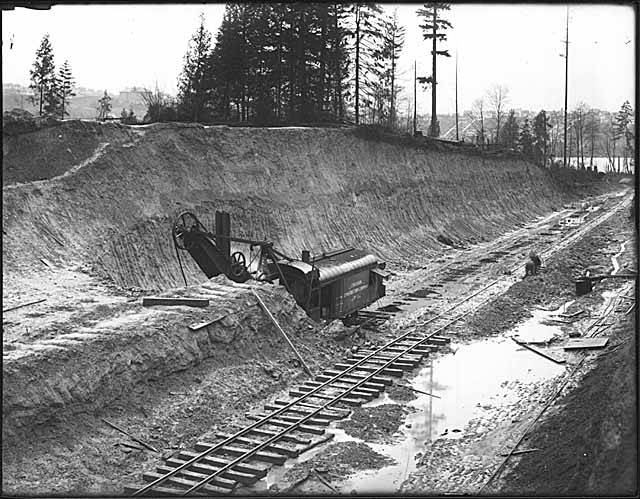
Montlake Cut under construction in 1914

The Montlake Cut's original name was Erickson Cut. Contractor C. J. Erickson commenced the big project in turning on his big steam shovel in celebration of the October 27, 1909, post A-Y-P Exposition era, in the final push to complete the Lake Washington Canal project. At the ceremony were Judge Roger S. Greene, Judge Thomas Burke, J. S. Brace and John H. McGraw, who turned the first shovel of dirt that day.

== Environmental impact ==
The creation of the cut lowered the water level of Lake Washington by 8.8 feet (2.7 m), drained the wetlands around the lake, and lowered the lake below the outflow at the Black River, leaving the Black River dry.

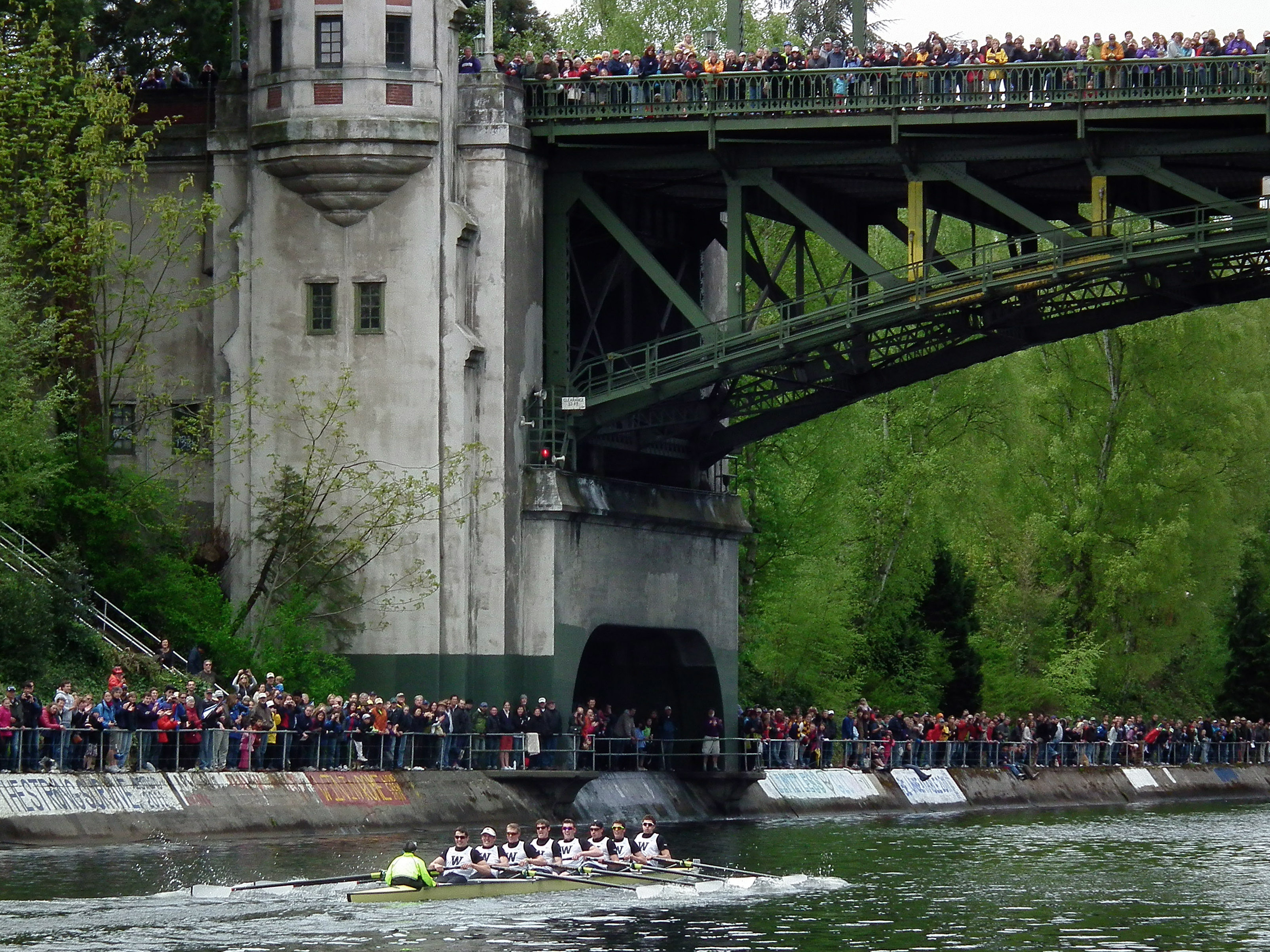
University of Washington men's crew competes in the 2011 Windermere Cup during opening day of boating season; Montlake Bridge is in the background.

The effects on the water level of Lake Washington also resulted in a great reduction of the salmon population in the lake. The Black River gave the Duwamish people salmon, which was an important part of their diet and a major part of their spirituality.

Although the ecosystem of the Montlake Cut has since recovered, the damages were major at the time.

== Present day ==
The industrial uses of the Montlake Cut have since decreased, and it is now primarily used for leisure boating and recreational uses. The cut is a popular location of recreational swimming and sunbathing for University of Washington students during the spring and summer.

The cut is home to the University of Washington rowing team, serving as the final 500 meters of the 2,000-meter racecourse.

It is the site of the annual Windermere Cup crew regatta and the Seattle Yacht Club's Opening Day Boat Parade, both of which take place on the first Saturday in May.
