= South Passage Point Park =

Park in Seattle, Washington, U.S.

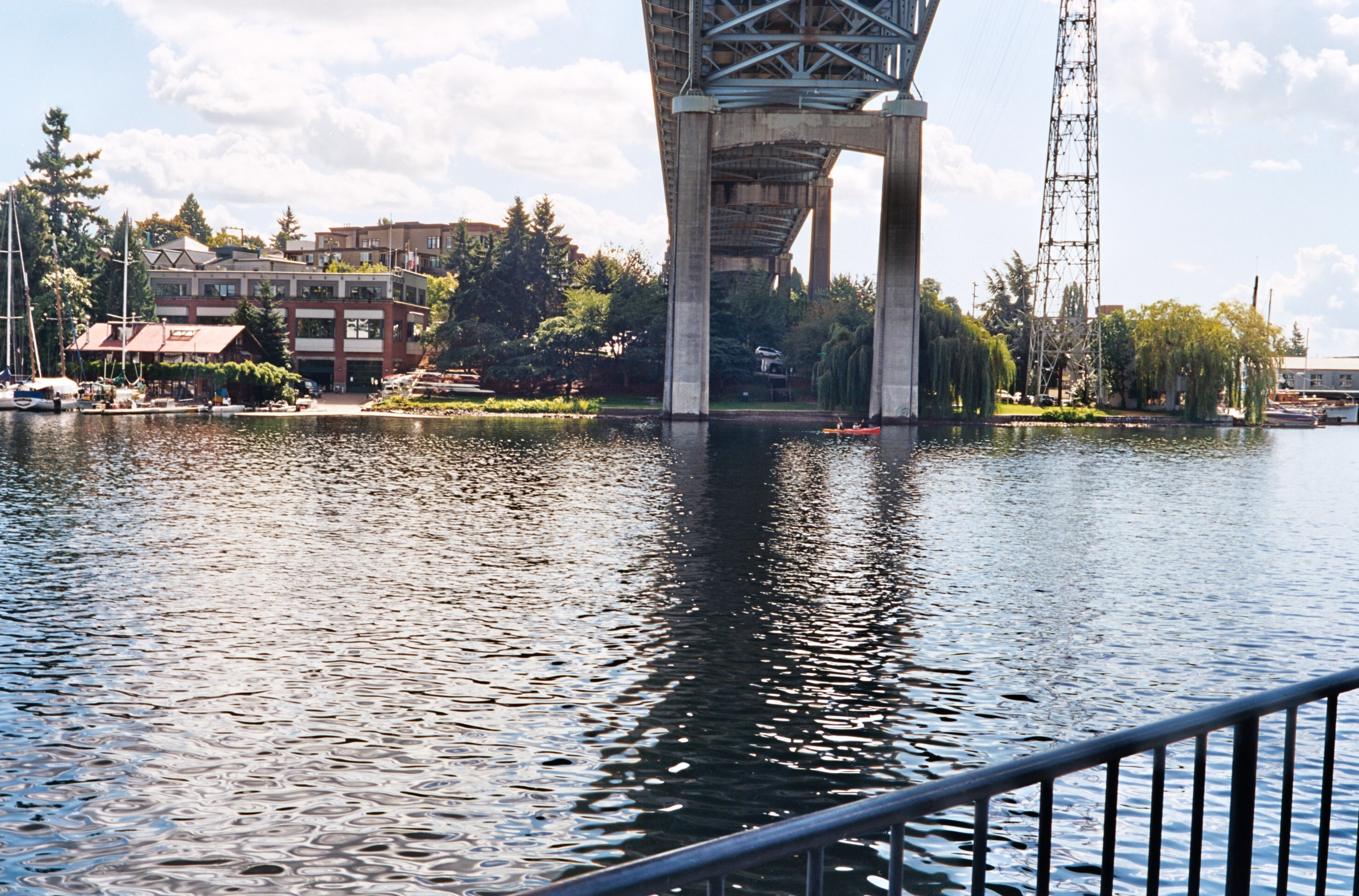
- South Passage Point Park seen from North Passage Point Park across Portage Bay.
- Location: Seattle, Washington
- Coordinates: 47.652141°N 122.322705°W
- Area: 0.9 acres (0.36 ha)
- Established: 1977; 48 years ago
- Operated by: Seattle Parks and Recreation

South Passage Point Park is a 0.9-acre (0.36 ha) park located in the Eastlake neighborhood of Seattle, Washington, United States. It is directly underneath the Ship Canal Bridge on the south side of the Lake Union/Portage Bay shoreline; North Passage Point Park is directly across the water on the north shore. The park was dedicated in 1977.
