= Seattle Marathon =

Annual race in the United States held since 1970

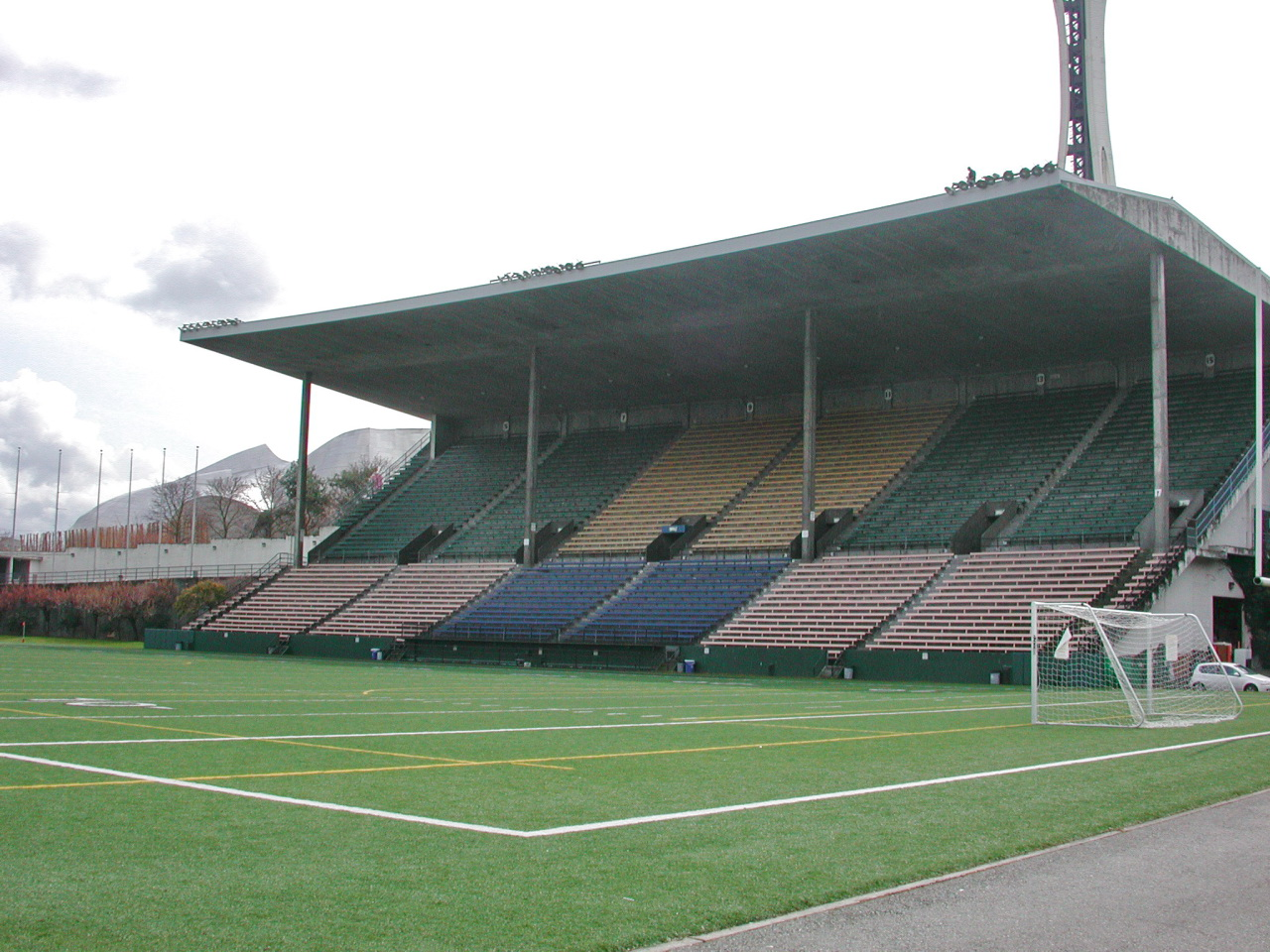
- Memorial Stadium, location of the finish
- Date: Usually November
- Location: Seattle, Washington, U.S.
- Event type: Road
- Distance: Marathon
- Established: 1970 (56 years ago)
- Website: Official website
- Participants: 8,642 finishers (marathon) (2025)

The Seattle Marathon is an annual marathon in Seattle, Washington, U.S. It was first held in 1970 and typically takes place the weekend following Thanksgiving.

== History ==
The inaugural race took place on November 15, 1970. It was organized by a group of friends from the University of Washington. A total of 38 runners participated, with 31 running the full distance. (Note: The Association of Road Racing Statisticians (ARRS) records that only 21 runners finished.)

The 2020 in-person edition of the race was cancelled due to the coronavirus pandemic. Entrants were given the option to defer their entry to 2021 or get refunded.

== Course ==
External images
- Course map of full marathon in 2007
- Course map of full marathon in 2018

=== Former course ===
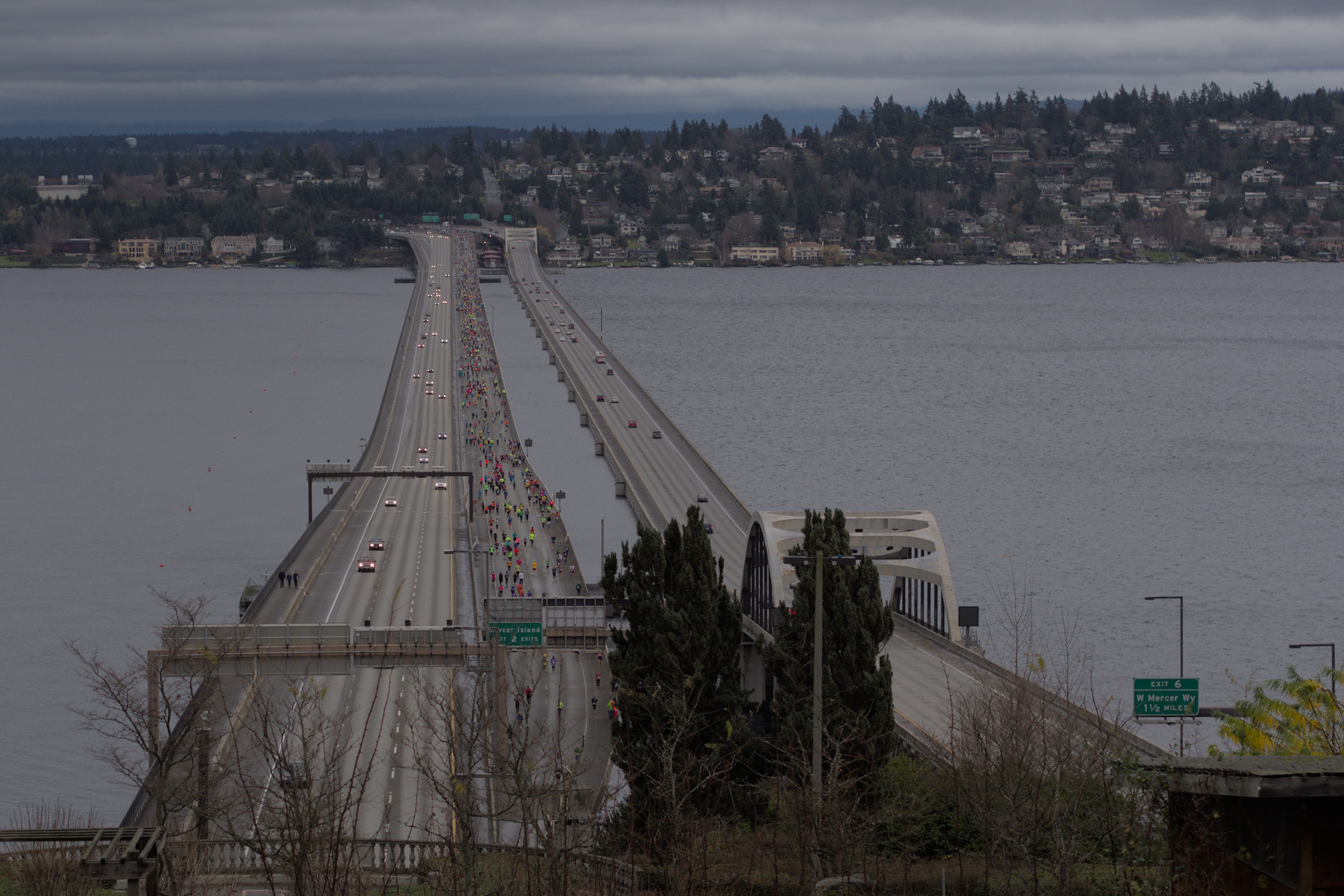
Course on the Homer M. Hadley Memorial Bridge in 2013

A former course began on 5th Avenue N. between Harrison and Mercer Streets in front of the Museum of Pop Culture on the eastern edge of the Seattle Center campus, followed 5th Avenue through Downtown and the International District to Interstate 90, followed I-90 across Lake Washington to Mercer Island, turned around and headed back across the Homer M. Hadley Memorial Bridge to the shoreline, followed Lake Washington Boulevard S. to Seward Park, looped Bailey Peninsula, and followed Lake Washington Boulevard S. back up the shoreline to McGilvra Boulevard E. in Madison Park. From there, the course followed E. Madison Street southwest to the southern entrance of the Washington Park Arboretum, turning north on Lake Washington Boulevard E. to E. Interlaken Boulevard. The course followed Interlaken northwest out of the Arboretum and through Interlaken Park, then west across Interstate 5 to Boylston Avenue E. Heading south, it followed Boylston back under the freeway, where it becomes Lakeview Boulevard E., then followed Lakeview south, once again over the interstate, to Eastlake Avenue E. The course turned west on Republican Street through Cascade to Dexter Avenue N., where it jogged north one block to Mercer Street, then turned south on 4th Avenue N. and finished within Memorial Stadium in Seattle Center.

=== Later course ===
The 2018 marathon course began on 5th Avenue N and Harrison Street near the Space Needle, and ended in the nearby Memorial Stadium. The course first headed southwest into Downtown Seattle before heading north via Interstate 5 and crossing the Lake Washington Ship Canal via Ship Canal Bridge. Runners then went up to NE 103rd Street (just past Matthews Beach Park) and back via the Burke-Gilman Trail. The marathon continued west largely on the trail until hitting a turnaround point near 8th Avenue NW, and then headed back south across Lake Union via the Aurora Bridge to finish in Memorial Stadium.

=== Current course ===
As of 2024, the marathon course begins adjacent to the Space Needle on the Seattle Center campus and travels south on 5th Avenue through Downtown Seattle. It then turns north onto the Interstate 5 express lanes and crosses the Ship Canal Bridge over the Lake Washington Ship Canal to an exit in the University District. The course travels east and south across the University of Washington campus via Stevens Way and Rainier Vista to cross the Montlake Bridge. It continues through the Washington Park Arboretum and turned west onto Interlaken Boulevard to cross the University Bridge and turn west onto Northlake Way towards Gas Works Park. The course then turned north onto State Route 99 through Woodland Park and circled Green Lake before returning to the highway. It then continued across the Aurora Bridge and ended at Memorial Stadium.

== Sponsorship ==
The marathon was previously sponsored by Amica Insurance.

The current title as sponsor as of 2023 is UW Medicine.

== Seattle Quadzilla ==
The Seattle Marathon used to be the last of a series of four marathons in four days referred to as the Seattle Quadzilla. The race series also included the Wattle Waddle Marathon on Thursday, the Wishbone Run on Friday, and the Ghost of Seattle Marathon on Saturday.

There were 24 finishers in 2010, the first year the series was held.

In recent years, there have been changes to these races and, as a result, the Seattle Quadzilla series. The Wattle Waddle continues to be held on Thanksgiving, but it is under new management. The Wishbone Run no longer takes place, and it has been replaced by the Grateful Runners Turkey Revenge. The Ghost of Seattle Marathon is also under new ownership as of 2024, and it is now known as the Seattle Ghost Marathon. Finally, the Seattle Marathon is no longer considered an official part of the Seattle Quadzilla. To earn the Quadzilla medal, a runner must instead complete the It's Beginning to Look a Lot Like Christmas pop-up race.

== Winners ==
Date	Male winner	Time	Female winner	Time	Rf.
November 15, 1970	Evan Shull (USA)	2:38:41	none (Note: ARRS notes that no females finished, but it is unclear if any females started, or if only males were permitted to run.)		
November 21, 1971	Sean O'Riordan (IRL)	2:31:09.8	Suzanne Taylor (CAN)	4:16:34	
November 19, 1972	Wolf Schamberger (CAN)	2:35:45	none		
December 1, 2019	Cesar Mireles (USA)	2:33:16	Kristina Randrup (USA)	3:03:59	
2020	cancelled due to coronavirus pandemic				
December 15, 2021	Alex Forte (USA)	2:29:32	Jordan Oakes (USA)	2:56:45	
November 26, 2022	James Wenzel (USA)	2:32:32	Fawn Whiting (CAN)	3:00:19	
November 26, 2023	Max Randal (USA)	2:27:03	Callahan McKenzie (USA)	2:47:54	
December 1, 2024	Max Randal (USA)	2:30:29	Devin McMahon (USA)	2:59:30	
November 30, 2025	Luke Calubayan (USA)	2:17:09	Ellie Baxter (USA)	2:49:20	
