= North Passage Point Park =

Park in Washington, United States of America

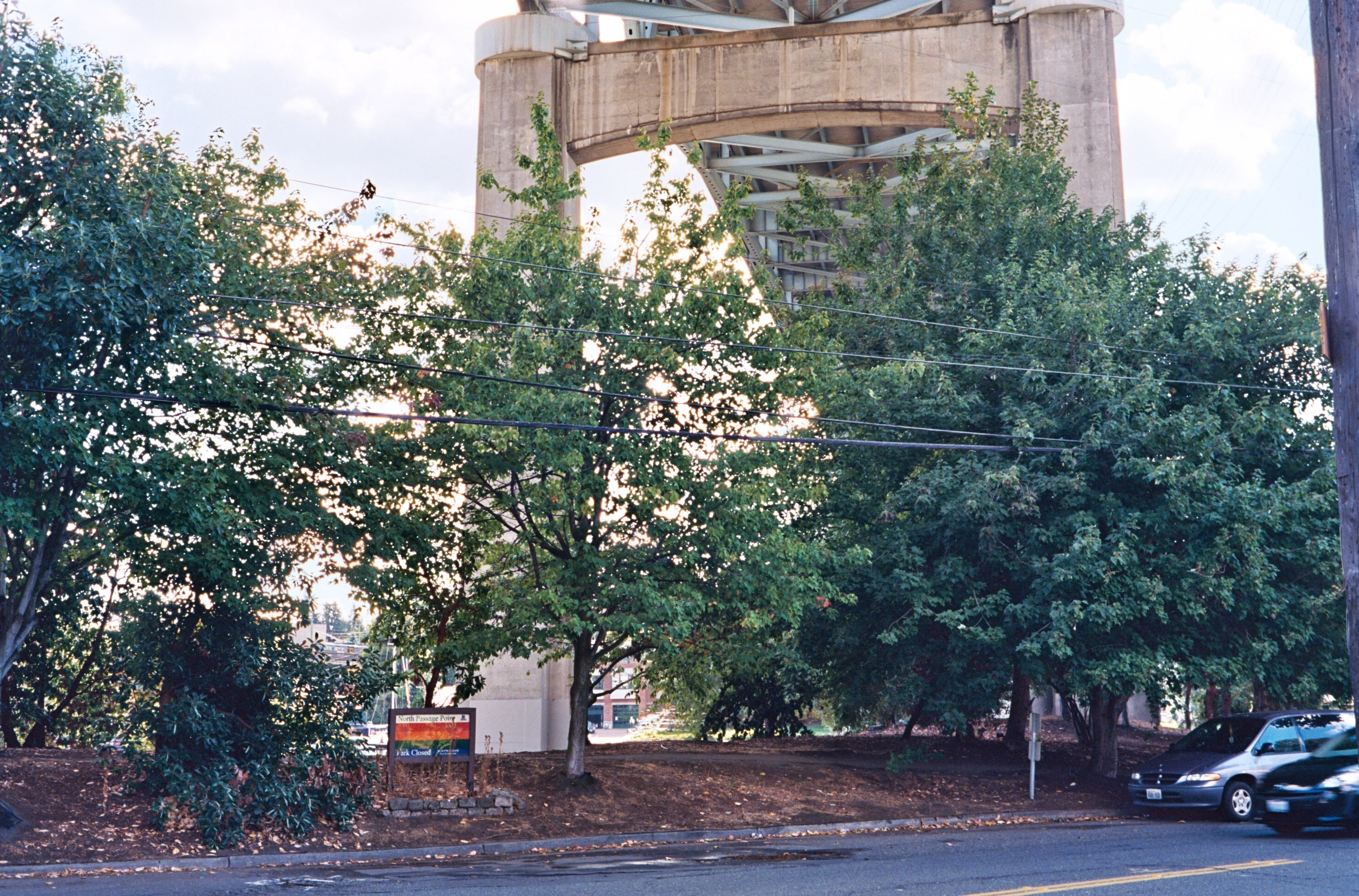
- Entrance to the park. The Ship Canal Bridge is above.
- Location: Seattle, Washington
- Coordinates: 47.653902°N 122.322299°W
- Area: 0.8 acres (3,200 m^{2})
- Established: 1977; 48 years ago
- Operated by: Seattle Parks and Recreation

North Passage Point Park is a 0.8-acre (3,200 m^{2}) park located in the Northlake neighborhood of Seattle, Washington, directly underneath the Ship Canal Bridge on the north side of the Lake Union/Portage Bay shoreline. It was dedicated in 1977. South Passage Point Park is directly across the water on the south shore.

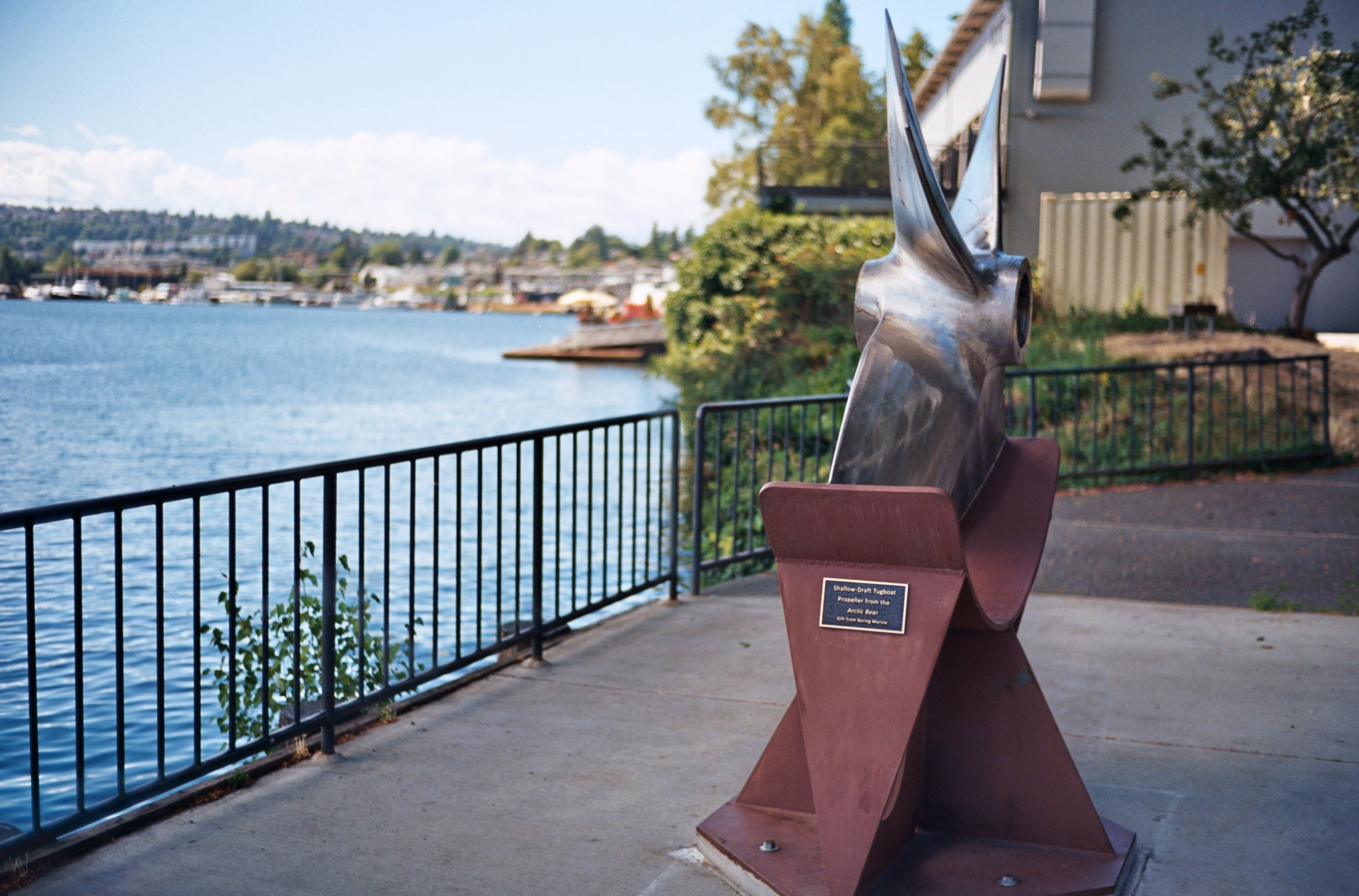
Shallow-draft tugboat propeller from the Arctic Bear.

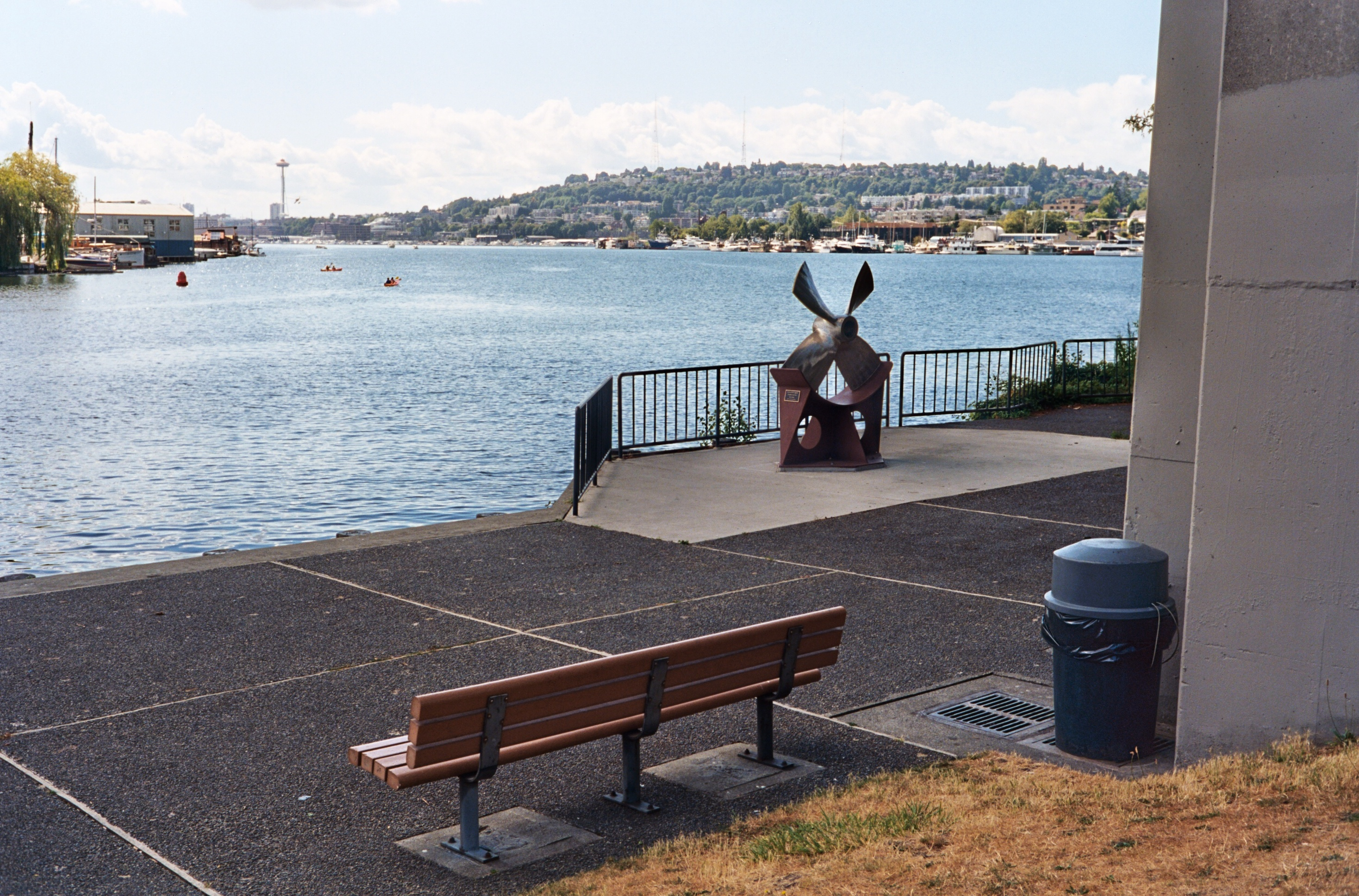
View of Lake Union and the Space Needle from the park.

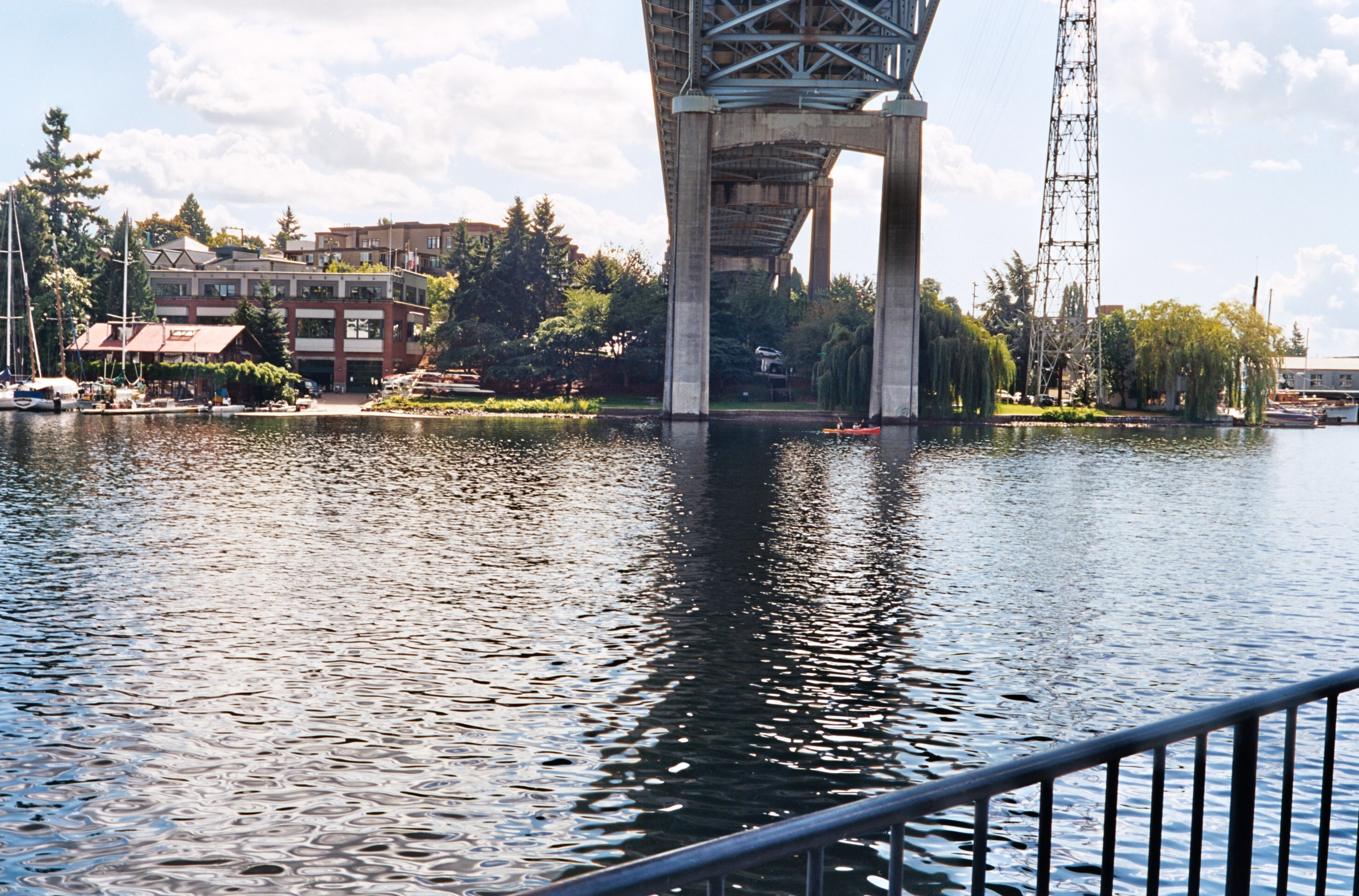
View across Lake Union to South Passage Point Park, also directly under the Ship Canal Bridge
