= Fairview Avenue North Bridge =

Bridge undergoing reconstruction in Seattle, Washington

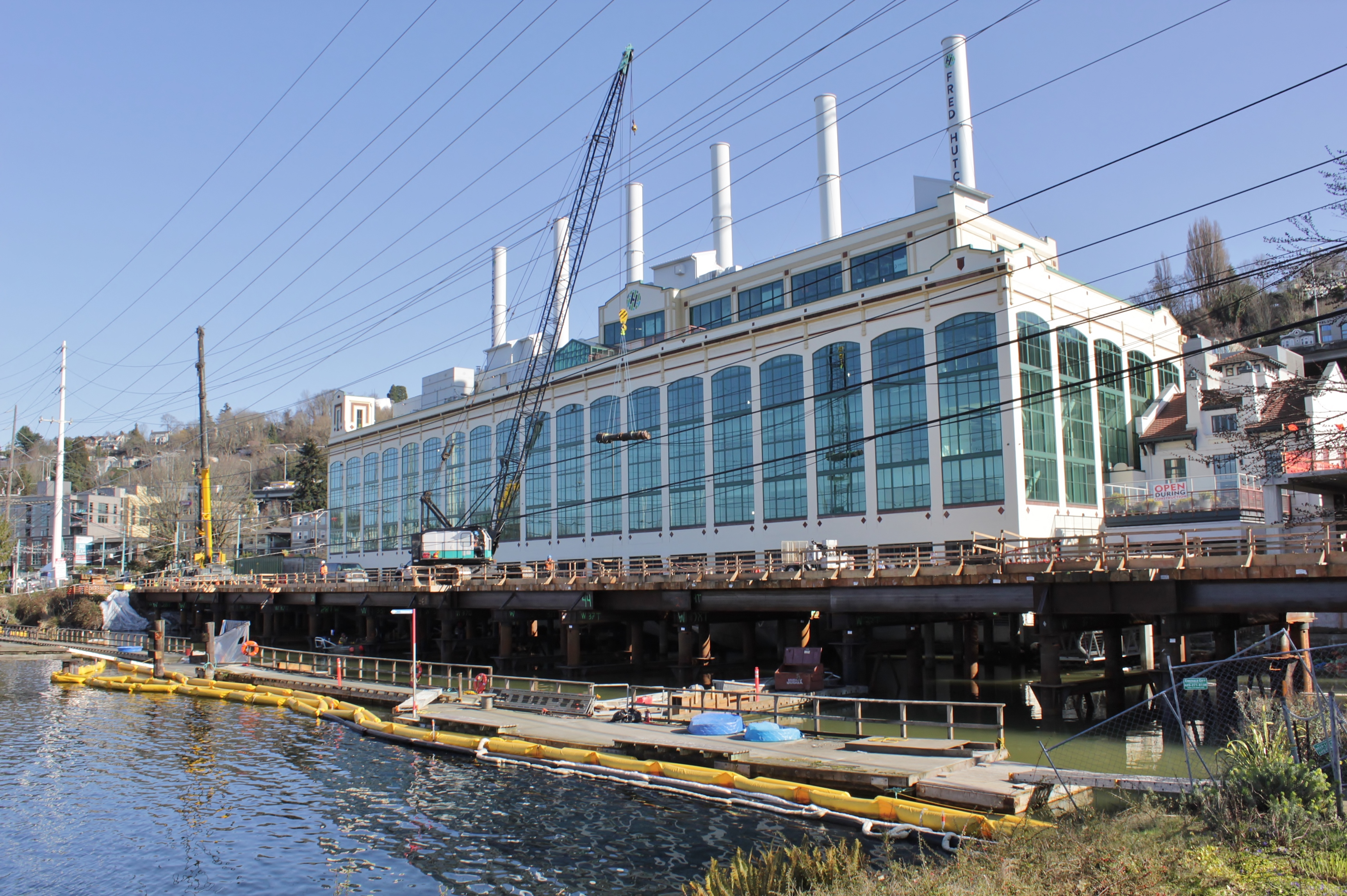
- Bridge replacement seen in February 2020
- Coordinates: 47°37′52″N 122°19′40″W
- Carries: Fairview Avenue North
- Crosses: Mudflats in eastern Lake Union
- Locale: Seattle, Washington, U.S.
- Maintained by: Seattle Department of Transportation

Characteristics
- Design: Timber-pile bridge (original)

History
- Opened: 1948 (original span); 1963 (parallel span); 2021 (new span)

The Fairview Avenue North Bridge is a road bridge in the Eastlake neighborhood of Seattle, Washington, United States, crossing a shallow arm of Lake Union. The original timber-pile bridge was built in 1948 and expanded with a concrete span in 1963. Both bridges were replaced by a new span that opened in 2021.

== History ==
The roadway relied on a once often used, but now outdated, construction atop a timber pier. The original span was built in 1948, with a parallel crossing completed in 1963. The crossing was closed in 2019 with a plan to reconstruct the road in 2020. The new bridge opened in July 2021.
