= Pocock Rowing Center =

American rowing club in Seattle, Washington

Coordinates: 47°39′08″N 122°19′19″W

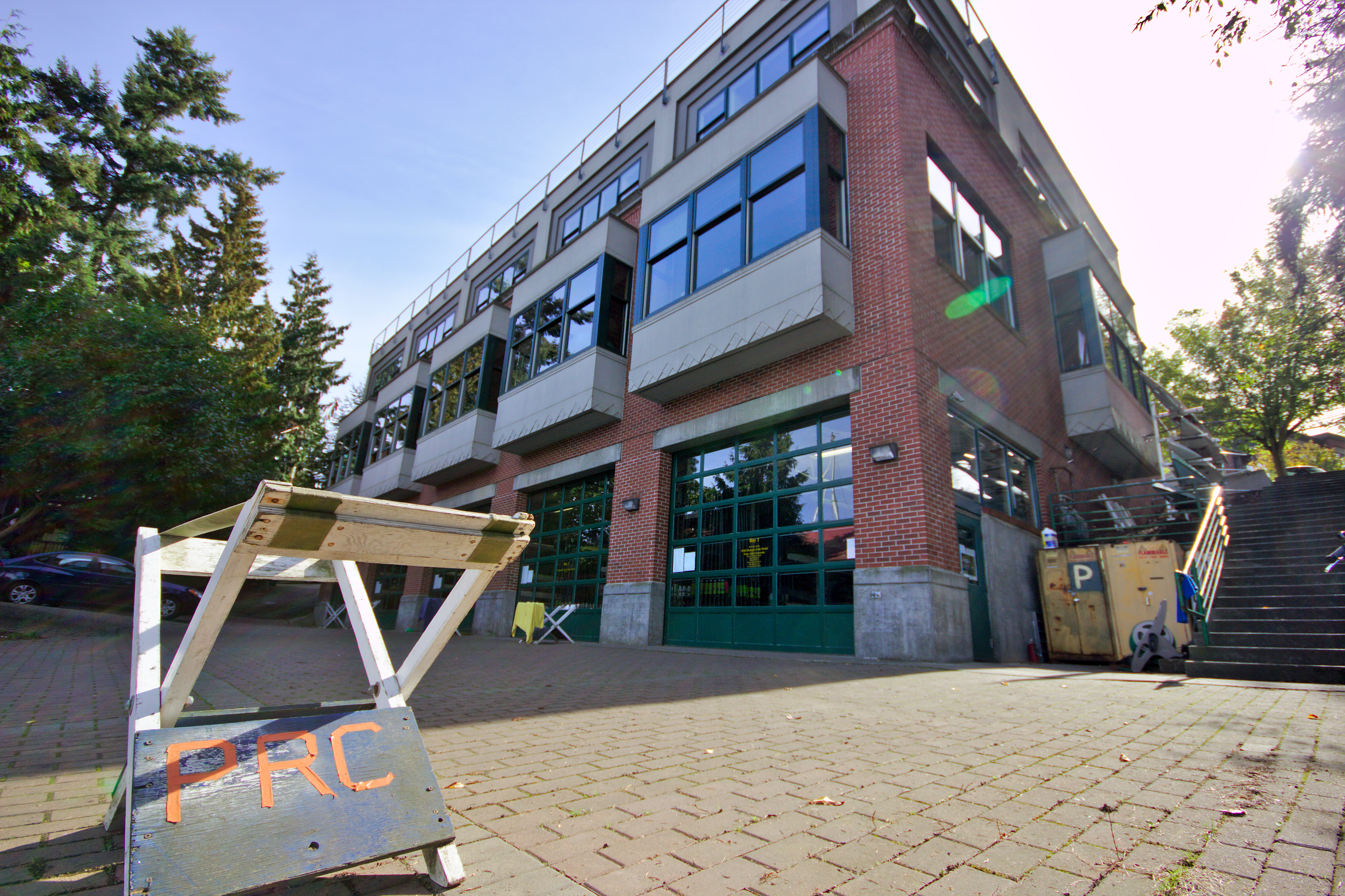
- Motto: Harmony, Balance, and Rhythm. There you have it. That is what life is all about.
- Location: Seattle, Washington
- Home water: Portage Bay; Lake Union
- Founded: 1994
- Membership: 400
- Website: www.pocockrowingcenter.org

Notable members
- Anna Cummins; Bryan Volpenhein

The George Pocock Memorial Rowing Center (Pocock Rowing Center) is an amateur rowing club famous for its namesake and its ability to produce world-class rowers.

== Prominent members ==
=== Members on the 2009 US National Team ===
- Steve Dani, Coaching Staff
- Bryan Volpenhein, Coaching Staff
- Lindsey Hochman, Lightweight Women's Quadruple Sculls (LW4x)
- Abby Broughton, Lightweight Women's Quadruple Sculls (LW4x)

=== Members on the 2008 US Olympic Team ===
- Anna Cummins (5 seat) Women's Eight (W8+)
- Lia Pernell (bow) Women's Quadruple Sculls (W4x)
- Anna Cummins (stroke) Women's Pair (W2-)

=== Members on the 2007 US National Team ===
- Lindsay Meyer, Spares
- Anna Mickelson, Women's Eight (W8+)
- Anna Mickelson, Women's Pair (W2-)
- Lia Pernell, Women's Quadruple Sculls (W4x)
