= Fairview Park (Seattle) =

Park in Seattle, Washington, U.S.

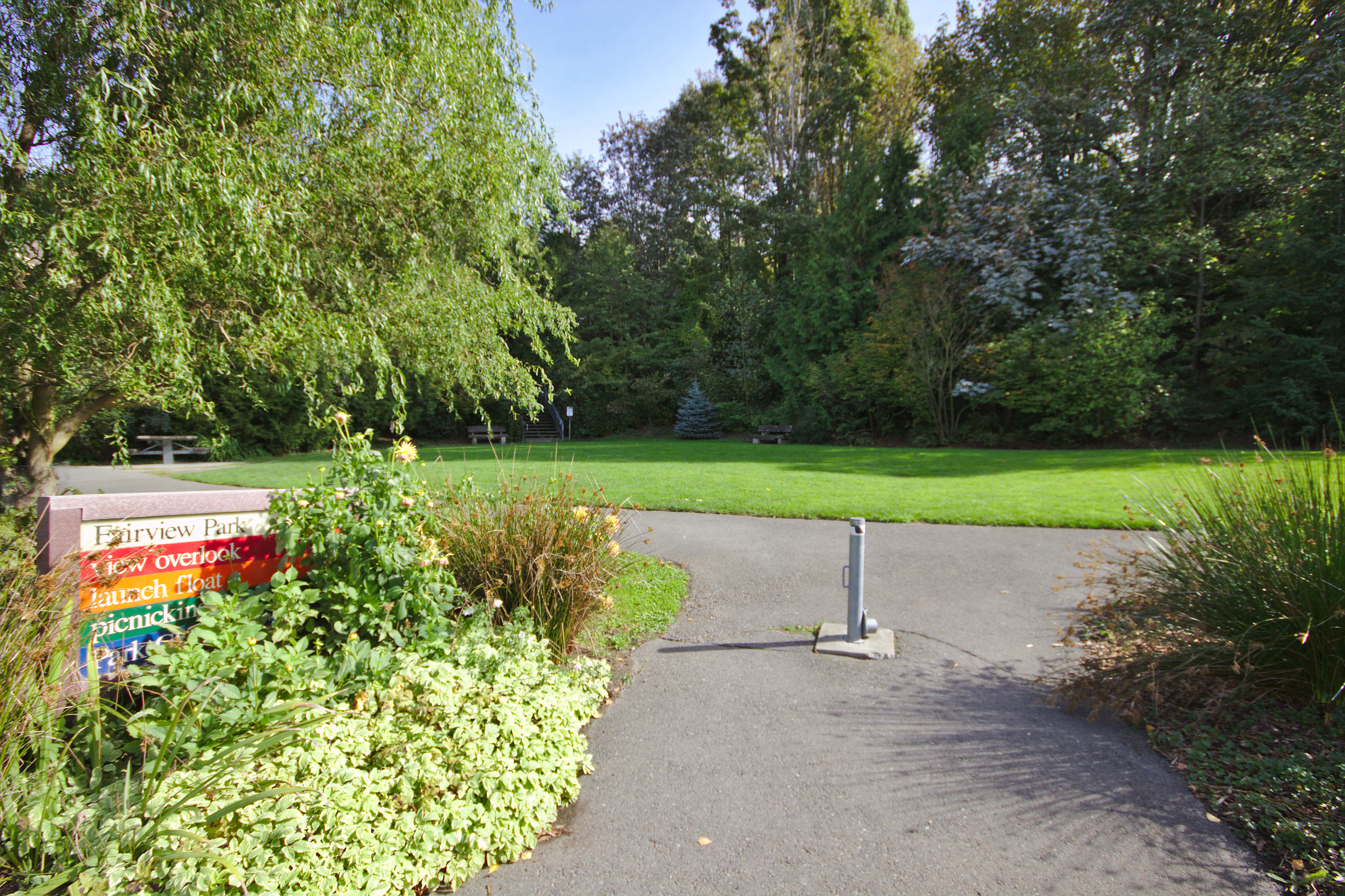
- Park entrance
- Interactive map of Fairview Park
- Location: Seattle, Washington
- Coordinates: 47°38′52″N 122°19′30″W
- Area: 0.8 acres (0.32 ha)
- Operator: Seattle Parks and Recreation
- Website: http://www.seattle.gov/parks/parkspaces/fairviewpark.htm

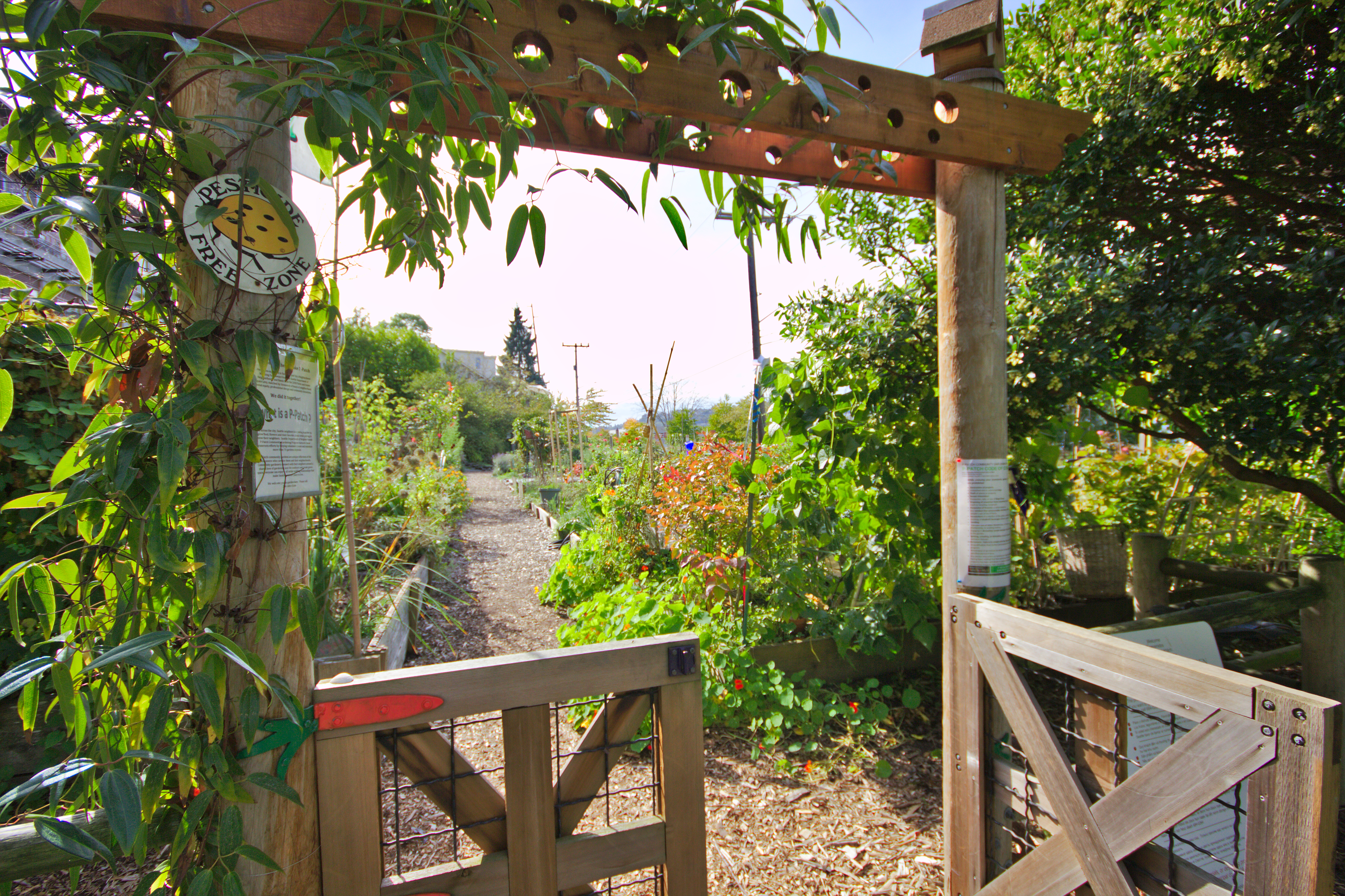
The P-Patch adjacent to the park

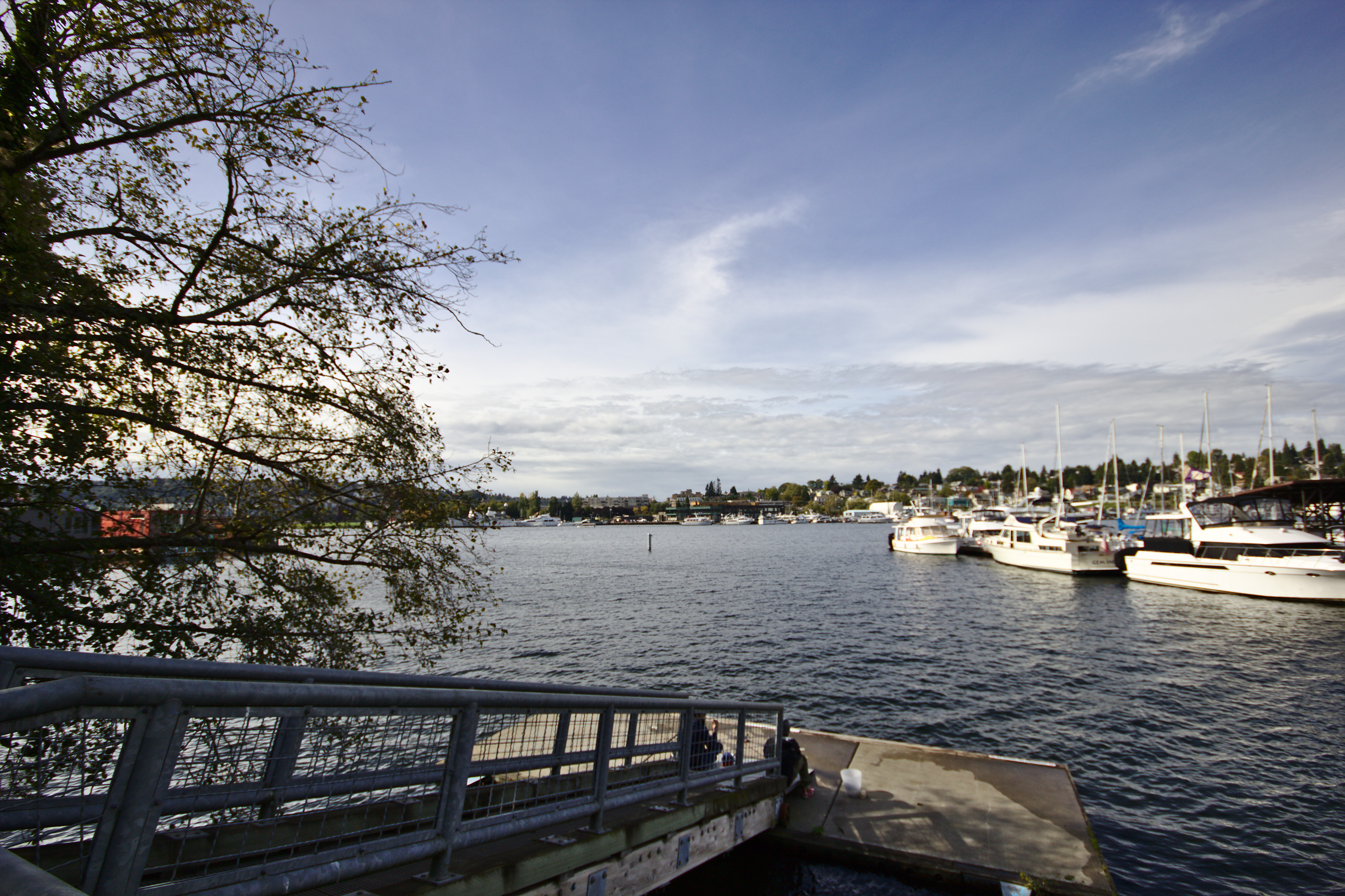
Platform onto Lake Union

Fairview Park is a 0.8-acre (3,200 m^{2}) park located in Seattle, Washington, on the eastern shoreline of Lake Union along Fairview Avenue E. between E. Hamlin and Allison Streets. It includes a P-Patch and a boat launch.
