= Fritz Hedges Waterway Park =

Park on the shore of Portage Bay in Seattle, Washington

- Portage Bay Park
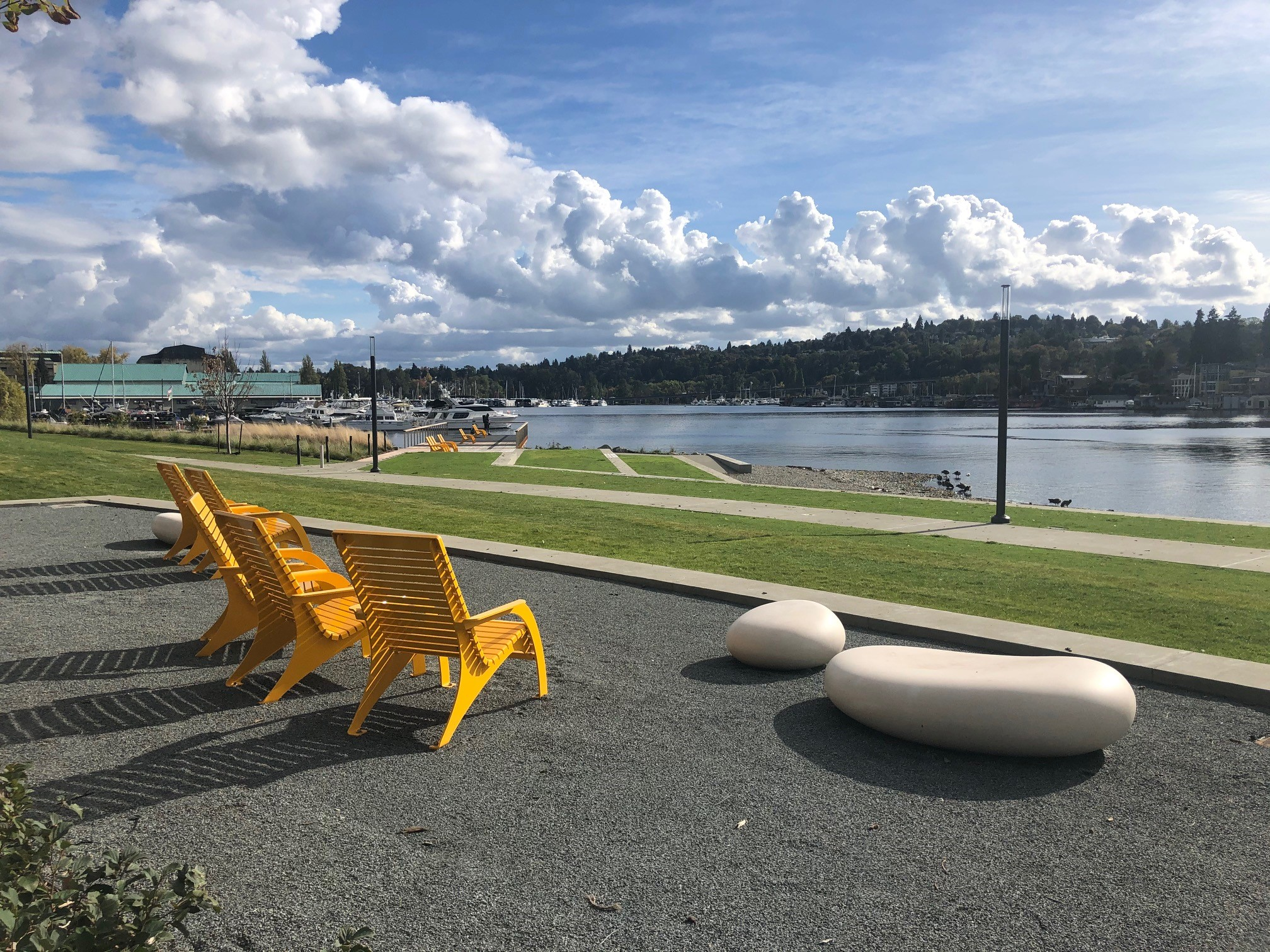
- Fritz Hedges Waterway Park looking over Portage Bay
- Interactive map of Fritz Hedges Waterway Park
- Location: Seattle, Washington
- Coordinates: 47°39′07″N 122°18′56″W
- Area: 3.5-acre (0.014 km^{2})
- Created: October 14, 2020
- Operator: Seattle Parks and Recreation
- Website: www.seattle.gov/parks

Fritz Hedges Waterway Park, also known as Portage Bay Park, is a 3.5-acre (0.014 km^{2}) park on the north shore of Portage Bay in the neighborhood of University District of Seattle, Washington.

The park includes a beach, pier, and a canoe and kayak launch. The park is Seattle's newest park, having been opened on October 14, 2020. Construction of the park took two years and included improvements to the habitat for salmon at the shoreline. The University of Washington owned the site since the 1970s and transferred ownership to the City of Seattle in 2013. The Washington State Department of Transportation provided $14 million to the city to purchase the site as compensation for the loss of public waterfront property due to the widening of State Route 520. The city provided $9 million to develop the park and the university paid $2.4 million for environmental remediation. The University Police station and the site of the UW surplus store were demolished to allow public access to the waterfront. The park was named after a Frederick 'Fritz' Hedges, a Seattle Parks and Recreation employee who died in 2004. The parks department said that Hedges "dedicated his life to the idea that parks and recreation are vital".
