= University Bridge (Seattle) =

Drawbridge in Seattle, Washington, United States

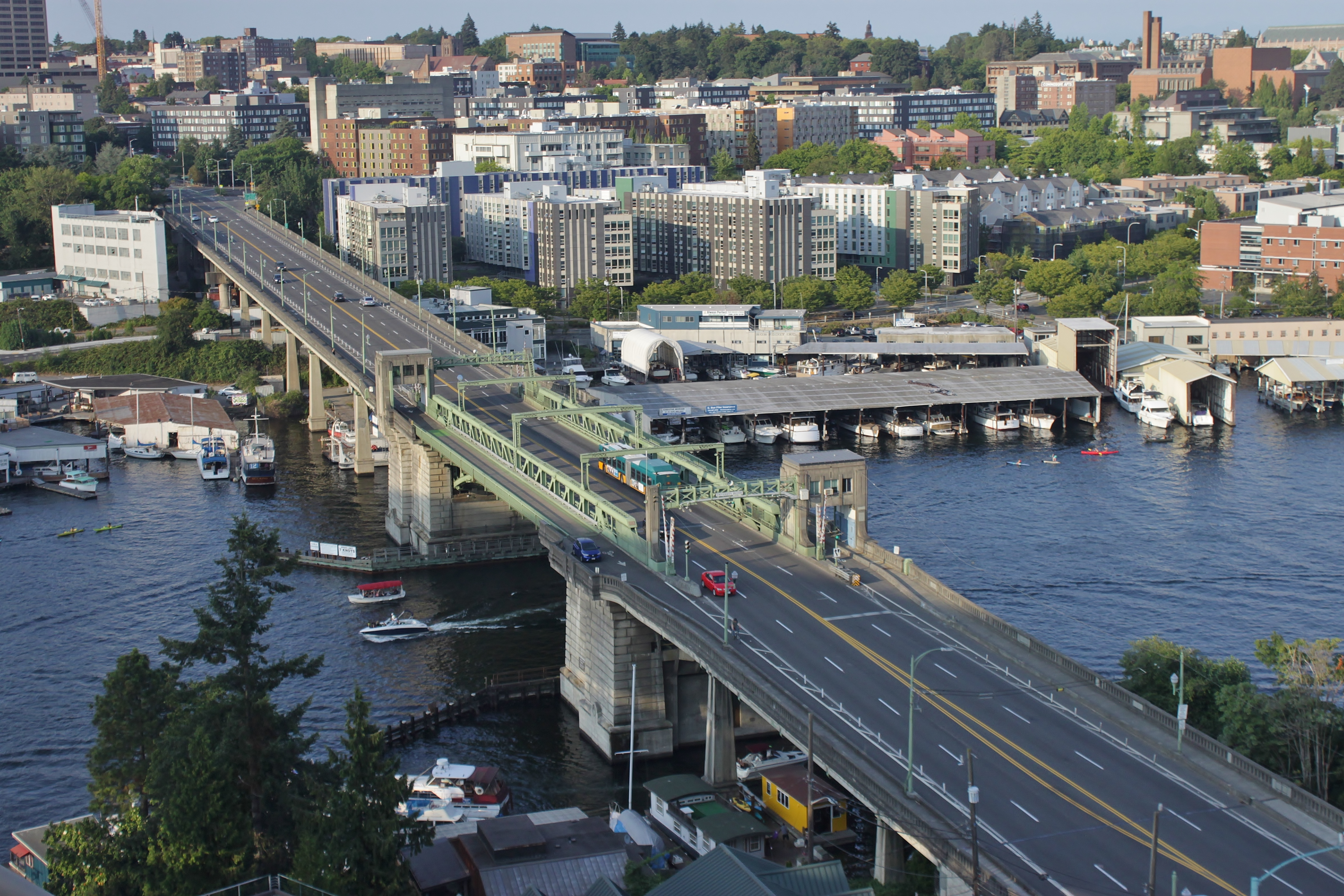
- University Bridge in July 2018 as seen from the taller Ship Canal Bridge
- Coordinates: 47°39′11.1″N 122°19′12.4″W
- Carries: Eastlake Avenue
- Crosses: Portage Bay
- Locale: Seattle, Washington

Characteristics
- Design: Bascule bridge
- Longest span: 218 ft (66 m)

History
- Opened: July 1, 1919
- University Bridge
- U.S. National Register of Historic Places
- Location: Spans Lake Washington Ship Canal, Seattle, Washington
- Built: 1915–1919
- MPS: Historic Bridges/Tunnels in Washington State TR
- NRHP reference No.: 82004254
- Added to NRHP: July 16, 1982

Location
- Interactive map of University Bridge

The University Bridge is a double-leaf bascule bridge in Seattle, Washington that carries Eastlake Avenue traffic over Portage Bay between Eastlake to the south and the University District to the north. It opened on July 1, 1919, and was extensively rebuilt from 1932 to 1933. It is included in the National Register of Historic Places.

== History ==
The bridge opened in 1919 under the name of Eastlake Avenue Bridge (also then known as the Tenth Avenue Northeast Bridge). It got its current and proper name on June 30, 1919.

By 1930, the bridge had begun to deteriorate enough for an extensive refit to be ordered: the timber trestle approaches were replaced with ones made out of concrete and steel, the control towers were rebuilt, and the wooden paving was replaced by the first application of open steel-mesh grating in the United States. Wooden paving had to be replaced every ten years or so; the steel-mesh grating has been replaced once, in 1990. The reconstructed bridge was opened April 7, 1933.

Originally, and until 1940, the bridge was crossed by streetcars of the Seattle Municipal Street Railway. From 1940 to 1963 and again since 1981, trolleybuses of the Seattle trolleybus system have used the bridge. Since 1984 (with the closure of the 1911 Cambie Street Bridge in Vancouver, Canada), the University Bridge and Seattle's Montlake Bridge have been the only movable bridges in the Western Hemisphere still crossed by trolleybuses. (The two trolleybus routes currently using the University Bridge are King County Metro routes 49 and 70.)

The University Bridge is one of four double-leaf bascule bridges spanning the Lake Washington Ship Canal that were collectively added to the National Register of Historic Places in 1982, the others being the Ballard Bridge, the Fremont Bridge, and the Montlake Bridge.

In 2014, its electronic controls were replaced after several components had worn out and caused multi-hour delays to lift and lower the bridge. During especially hot summer days, the University Bridge needs daily dousings with cool water to avoid expanding so much that they bind.

On September 17, 2025, while the drawbridge was partially raised, the driver of a stolen Audi Q5 crashed through the gate and jumped the gap in the bridge, evading police. The car was later found abandoned, with damage to its undercarriage. The driver has not been found or identified. The incident was one of only a few times in history when a car successfully jumped an open drawbridge.

== Sinkhole ==
On May 2, 2007, a 24-inch (61 cm) water main broke near the south end of the University Bridge, creating a 10-foot-deep (3.0 m) sinkhole forcing the closure of the bridge. The sinkhole also swallowed two unoccupied parked cars. The water main break compromised water quality and pressure in a large part of the Eastlake neighborhood, making tap water brown and unpotable. Many restaurants and other businesses were forced to close. There was concern for the integrity of a 40-inch main adjacent to the smaller one that broke. With the bridge closed, surface traffic between Seattle's University District and Downtown areas was heavily impacted. It was reopened on May 3, 2007, after city workers poured about 40 cubic yards of stabilizing concrete-sand slurry around the southern base of the bridge.

== Occupy Seattle ==
On November 17, 2011, the University Bridge was shut down by demonstrators for about an hour and a half during the evening rush hour, snarling traffic around the University District. The demonstrators included Occupy Seattle protesters, students, union workers, and church leaders. The protests were part of a national Day of Action against cuts to infrastructure, health care, and education spending.

== Pictures ==
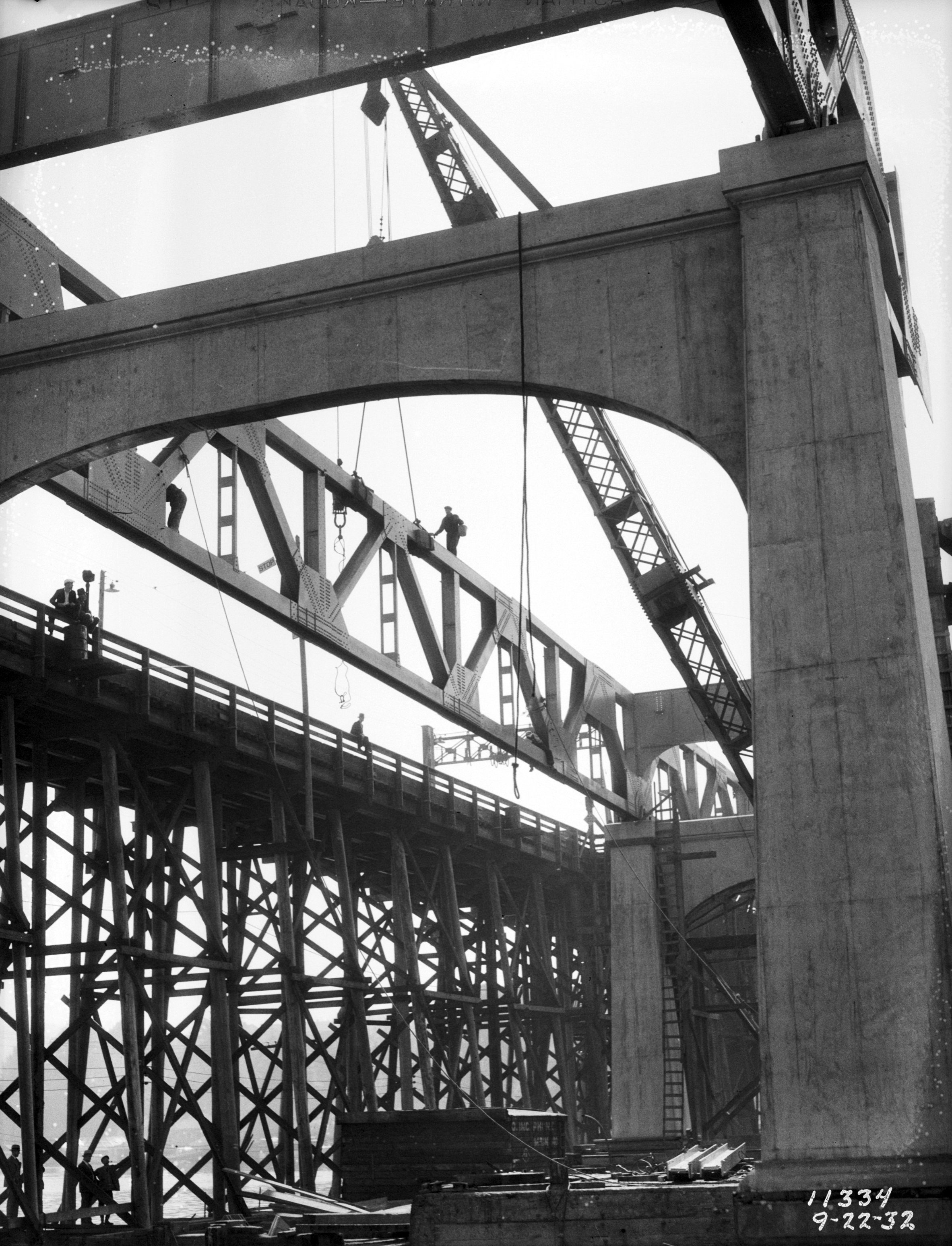
Undergoing major reconstruction in 1932.

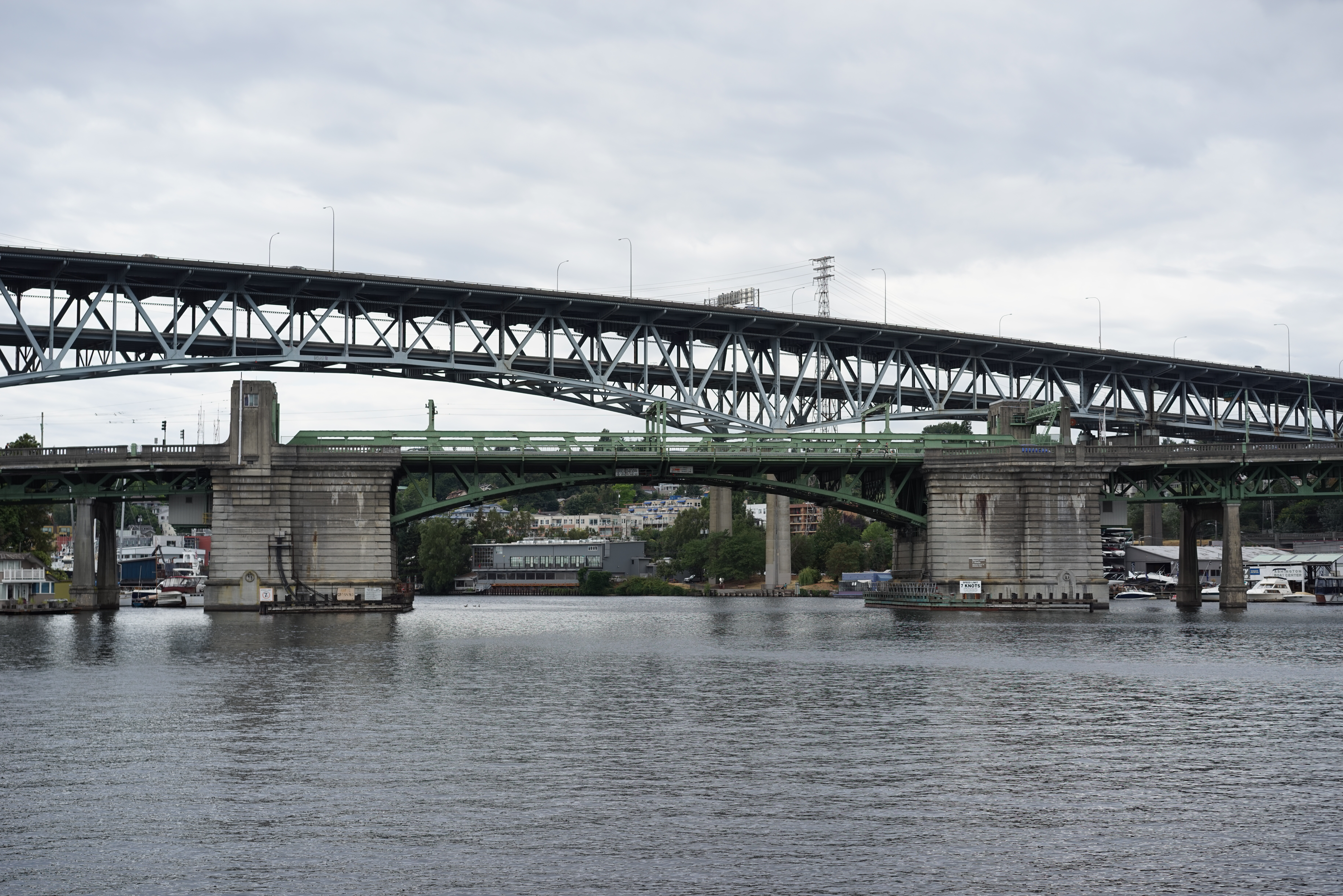
The bridge viewed from the east, with Ship Canal Bridge in the background.

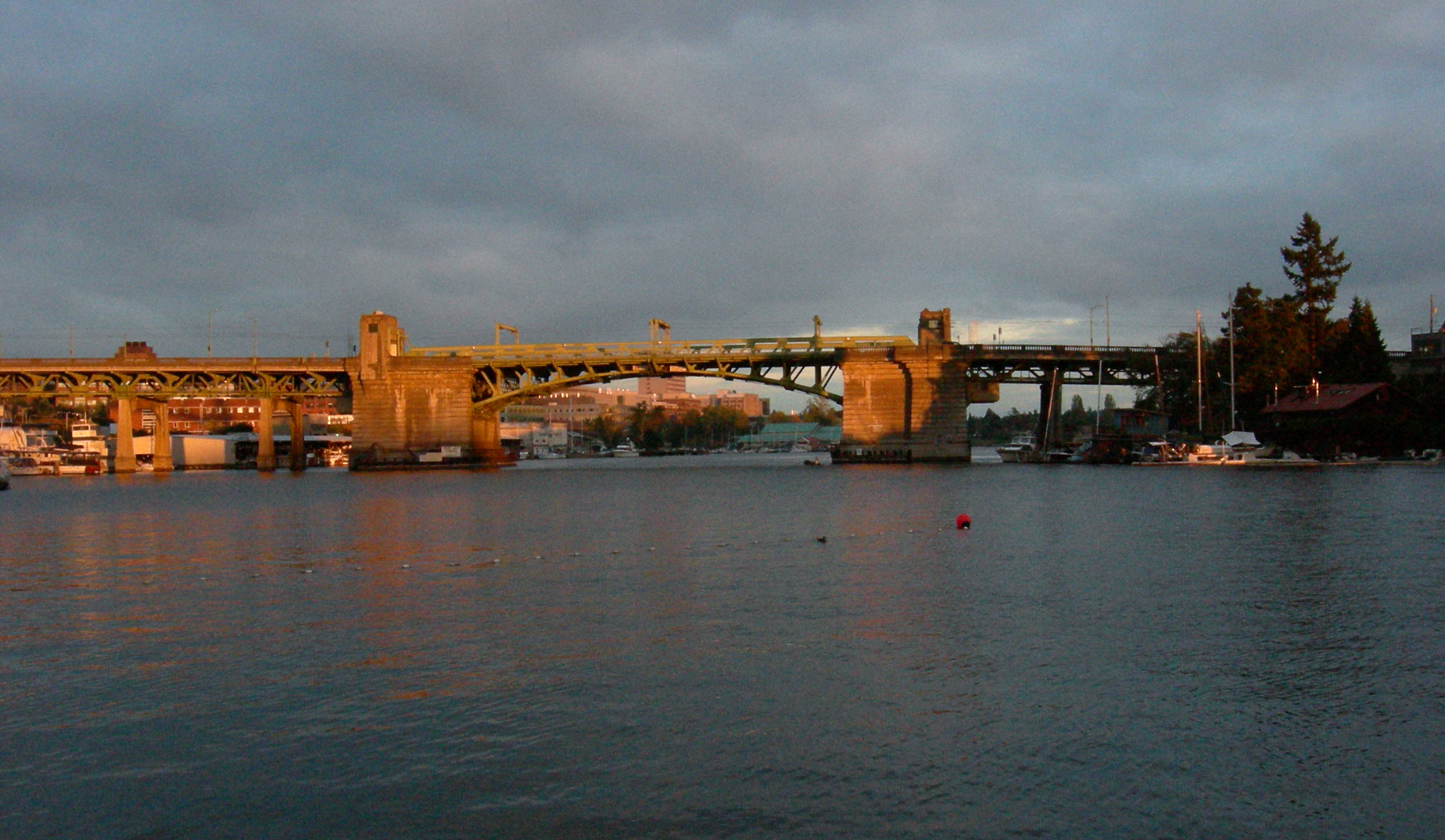
The bridge at sunset, viewed from the west

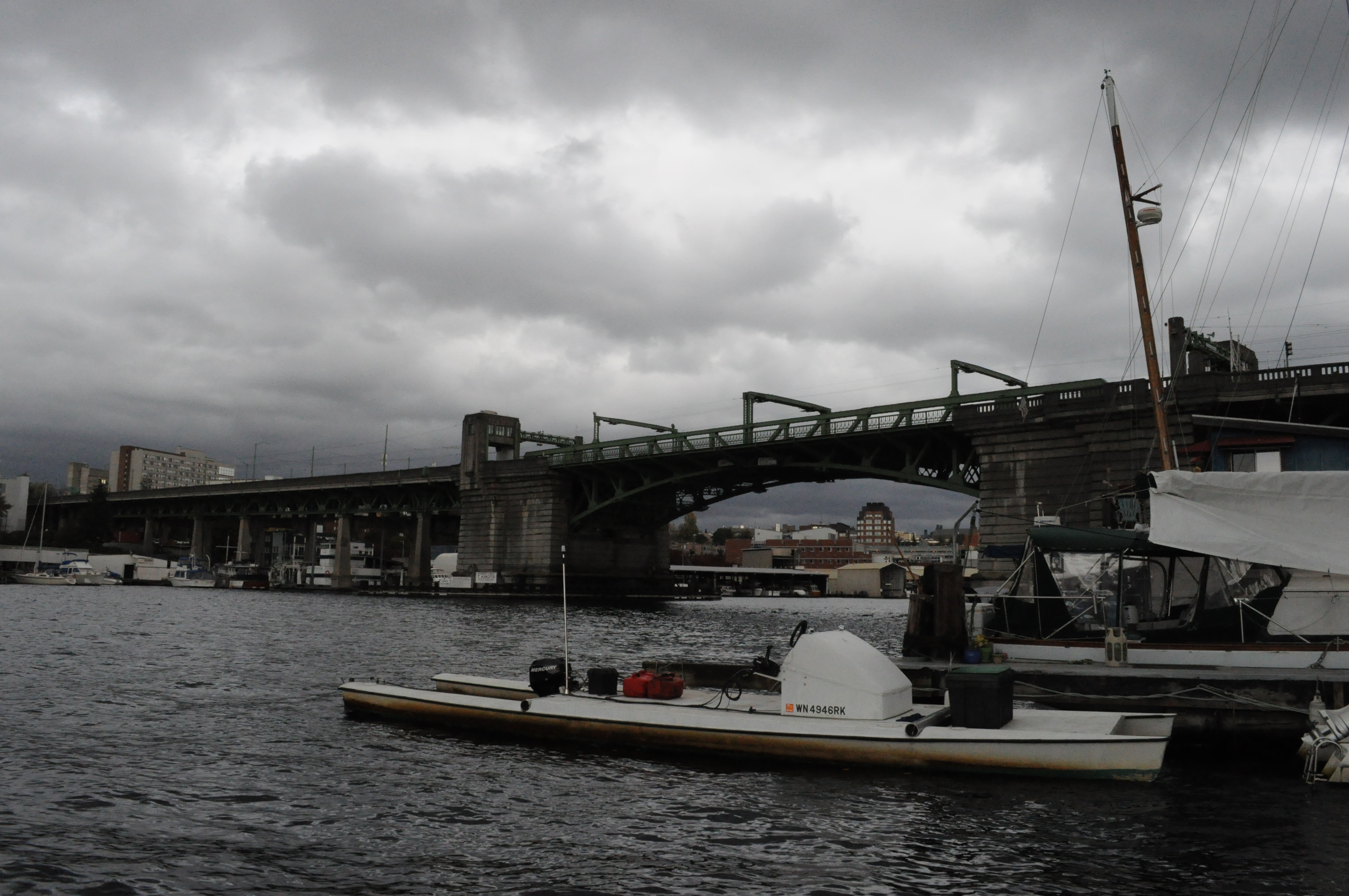
View from the south end

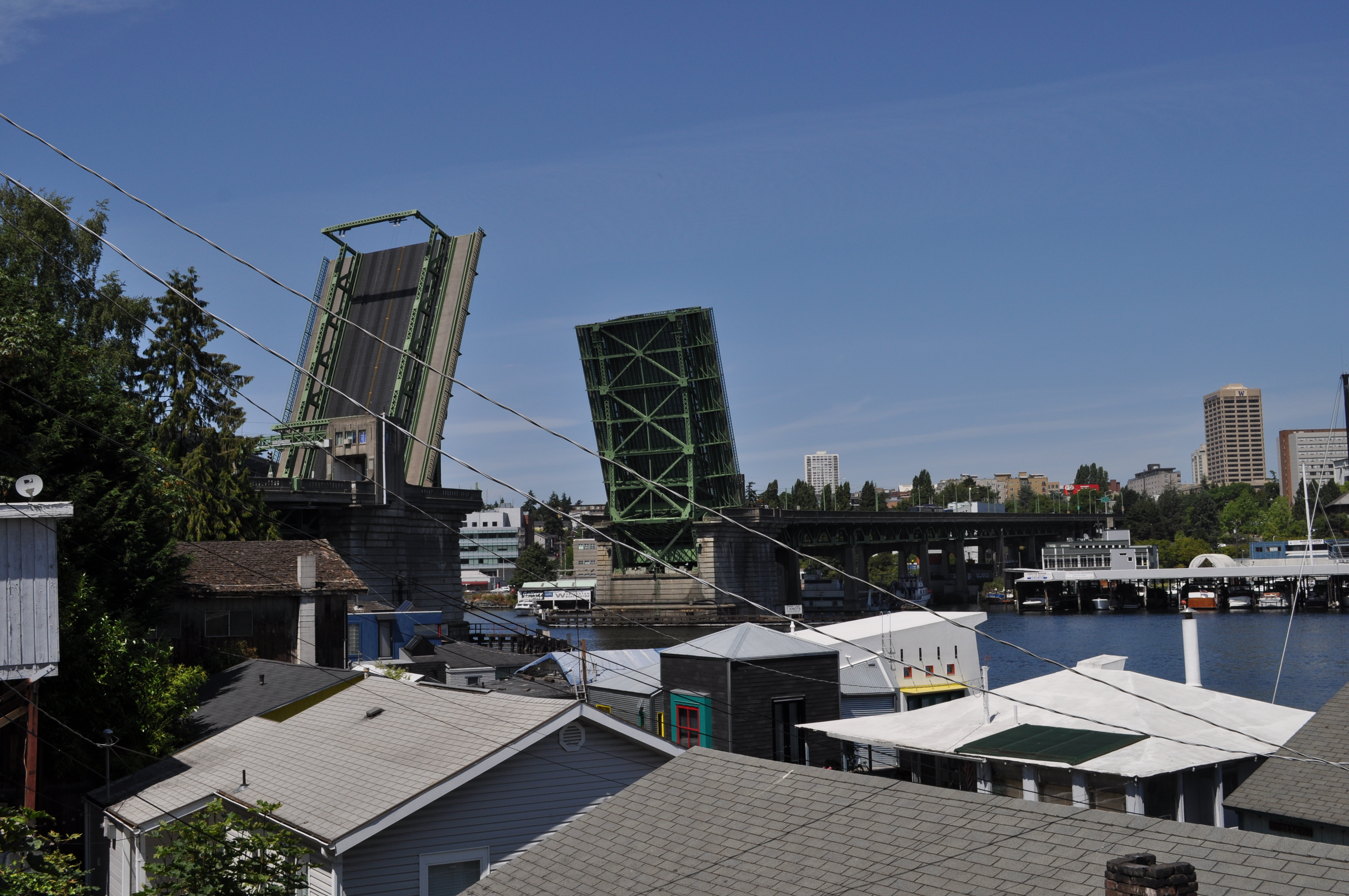
Bridge while open
