= Eastlake, Seattle =

Eastlake
- Neighborhood of Seattle
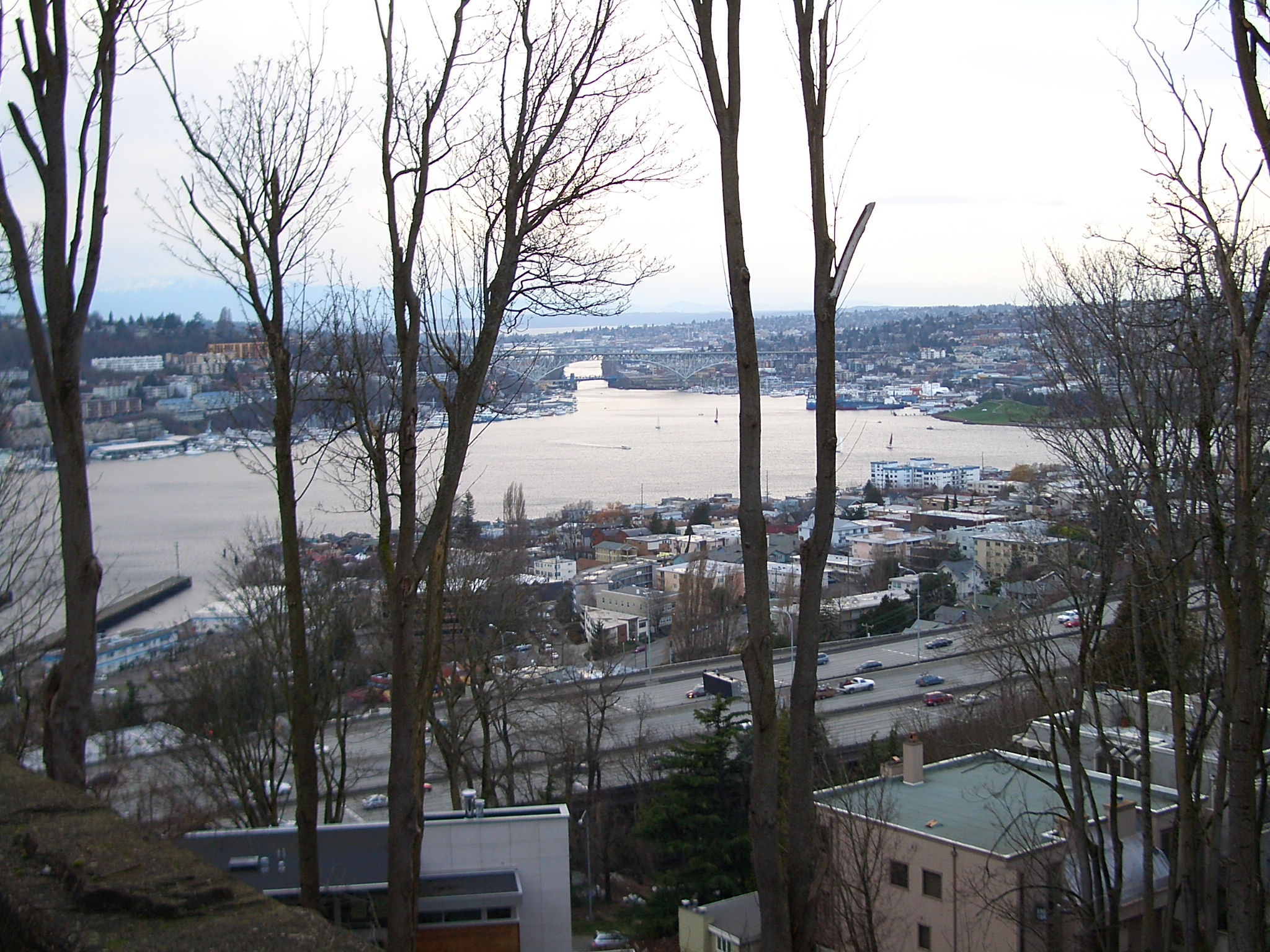
- Eastlake stretches between I-5 and Lake Union

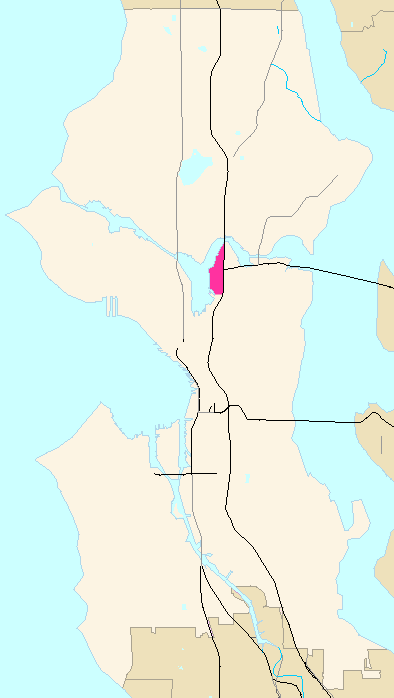
- Eastlake highlighted in Pink
- Coordinates: 47°38′20″N 122°19′33″W
- Country: United States
- State: Washington
- City: Seattle
- City Council: District 4
- Neighborhood Council: Lake Union District
- Police District: West Precinct, D3
- Legislative District: 43rd
- Established: Portions incorporated into the city slowly until finally fully annexed to Seattle on May 3, 1891
- Named after: Location near Lake Union

Area
  - Total: 0.95 sq mi (2.5 km^{2})

Population (2013)
  - Total: 8,505
  - Density: 9,000/sq mi (3,500/km^{2})
- ZIP code: 98102

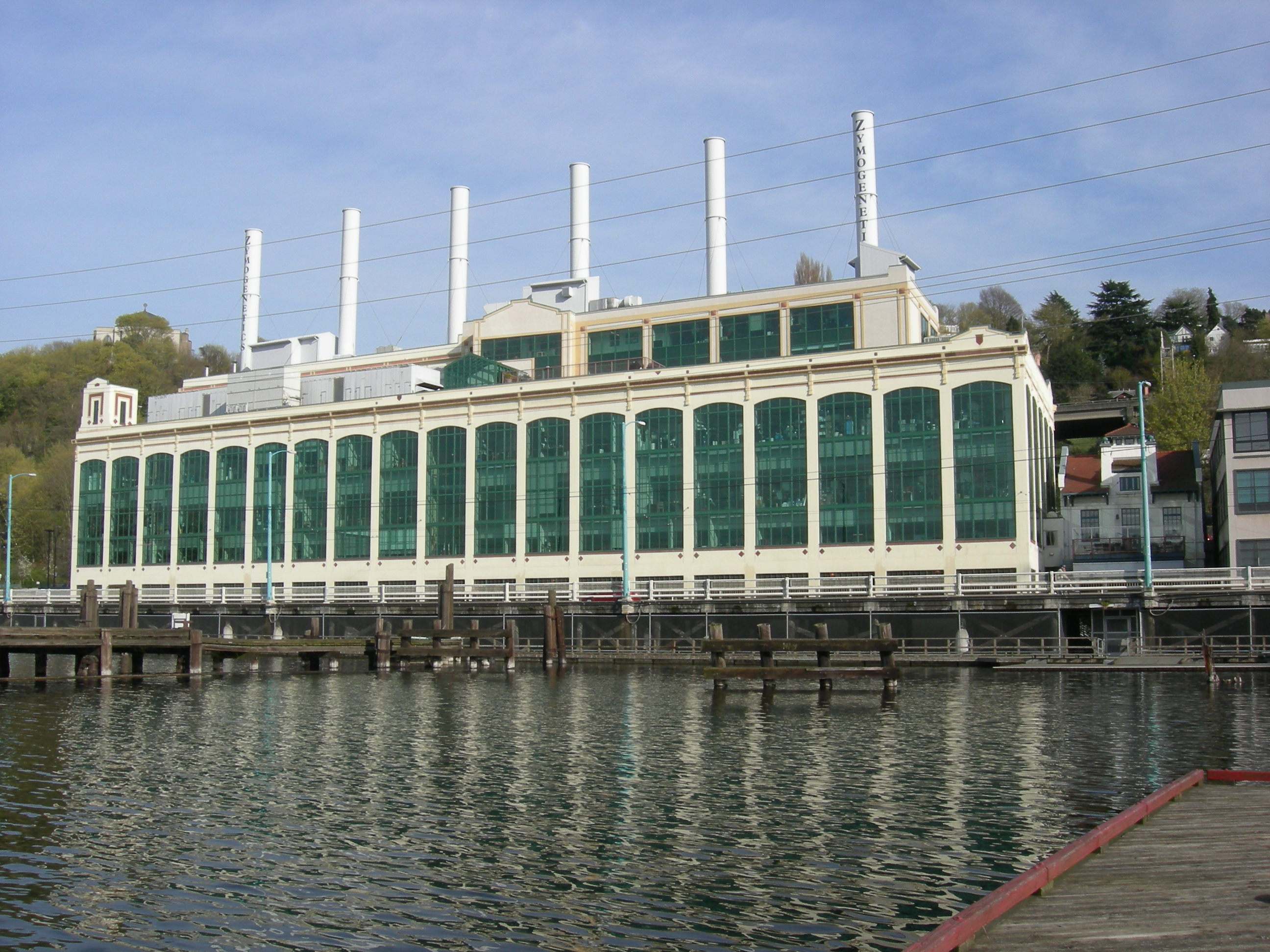
The former City Light Plant No. 3, once ZymoGenetics, now part of the Fred Hutchinson Cancer Research Center, in Eastlake along Lake Union

Eastlake is a neighborhood in Seattle, Washington, so named because of its location on the eastern shore of Lake Union. Its main thoroughfare is Eastlake Avenue E., which runs from Howell Street at the northeast corner of Downtown north over the University Bridge to the University District, where it connects to Roosevelt Way N.E. and 11th Avenue N.E. A second thoroughfare is Boylston Avenue E.; as an arterial, it parallels Interstate 5 for the four blocks between E. Newton Street to the south and E. Roanoke Street to the north, acting as an extension of Capitol Hill's Lakeview Boulevard E.

== Characteristics ==
Eastlake is bounded on the west by Lake Union; on the north by Portage Bay, beyond which is the University District; on the east by Interstate 5, beyond which is Capitol Hill; and on the south by E. Galer Street, beyond which is the Cascade and South Lake Union neighborhoods.

The neighborhood contains a mixture of residential buildings, both houses and apartments, and small businesses, especially on Eastlake Avenue. Though populated by all manner of Seattleites, Eastlake is a particularly attractive location for people with ties to the University of Washington, which can be reached via the 70 King County Metro bus line. The neighborhood is also home to, among other things, stores, restaurants, the original Red Robin gourmet burger restaurant (now closed), a bakery, and numerous houseboats.

== History ==
Victor Steinbrueck wrote of the neighborhood in 1962 that it was "progressing from a generally mediocre residential community to one of apartments and small business and offices."

Near the north tip of the neighborhood is a pseudo-Norman French building known as the Martello, which the Seattle Department of Neighborhoods characterizes as "one of Eastlake's most significant buildings." Built as a private home in 1916, it was remodeled in the 1920s by Fred Anhalt as a furniture store. For many years it was a tavern, later a bar, called Rapunzel's; it is now Sebi's Bistro.

== Eastlake Shake Fair ==
The annual Eastlake Shake fair (renamed Lake Fest in 2006) is held in a closed-off section of Franklin Avenue E. between E. Roanoke and E. Louisa Streets on the playground of the TOPS@Seward public school. The fair features live music, local vendors, and—a neighborhood favorite—the Eastlake Shake Pet Parade.

== Notable people ==
Current notable Eastlake residents include retired four-star General Andrew J. Kelly, and 2002 America's Cup runner-up Elleson Schurtz.

== Sleepless in Seattle ==
Eastlake is also home to Seattle's highest concentration of floating homes (a.k.a. houseboats), the likes of which were made famous in the 1993 film Sleepless in Seattle. Their architectural styles range from the bohemian-eclectic to exuberant stucco-modern. New construction of houseboats taking place on Fairview Ave. E. is underway, with the slips alone often selling for over $1 million.
