= Lake Union =

Lake in Seattle, Washington, U.S.

- x̌ax̌čuʔ (Lushootseed)
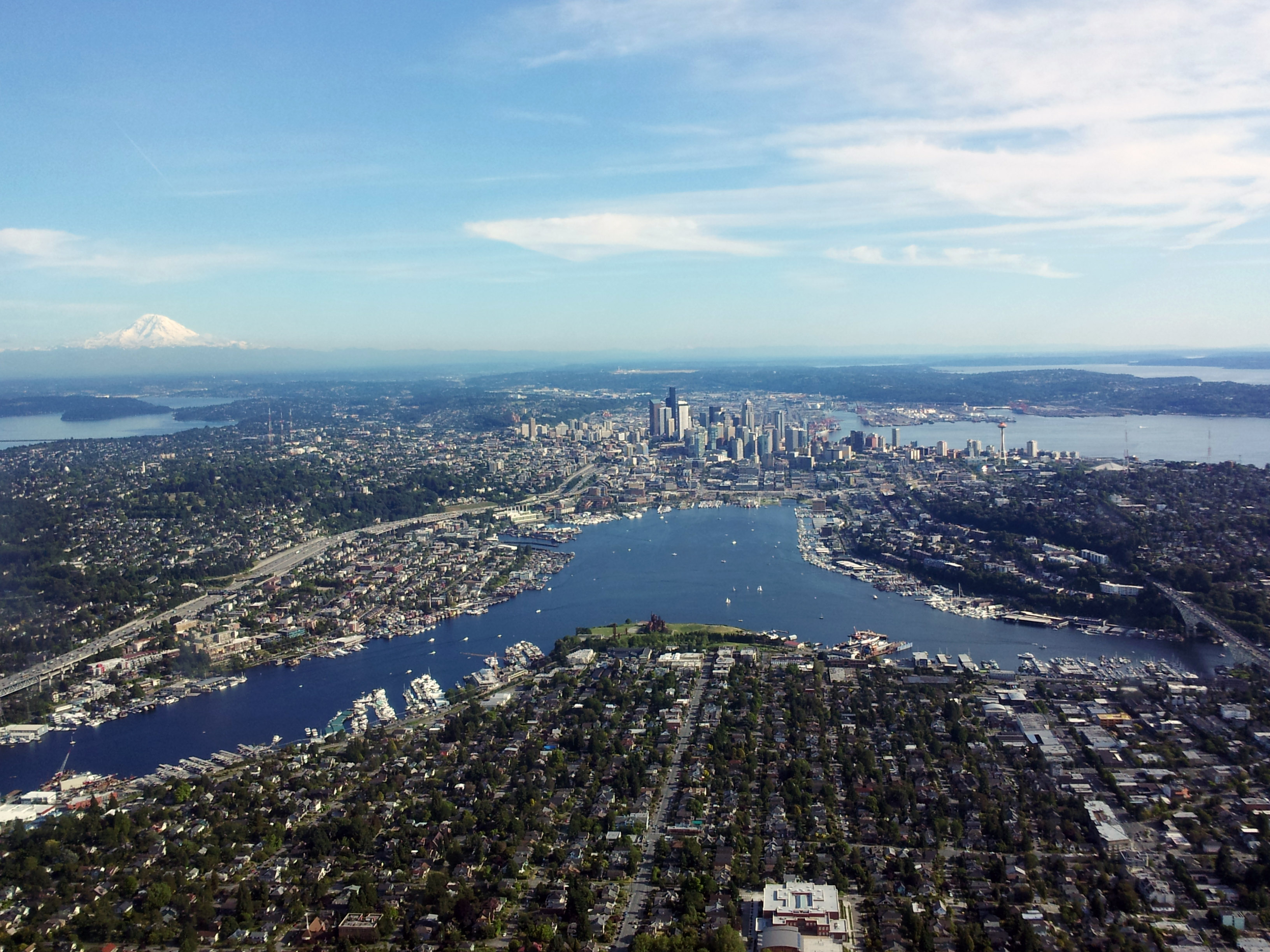
- Lake Union viewed from the north in 2012

- Location within Washington (state) Location within the United States
- Location: Seattle, Washington, U.S.
- Coordinates: 47.6392°N 122.3337°W
- Primary inflows: Lake Washington Ship Canal (Portage Bay from Montlake Cut)
- Primary outflows: Lake Washington Ship Canal (Fremont Cut to Salmon Bay)
- Catchment area: 571 square miles (1,480 km^{2})
- Basin countries: United States
- Surface area: 580 acres (2.3 km^{2})
- Average depth: 34 feet (10 m)
- Max. depth: 50 feet (15 m)
- Water volume: 20,000 acre-feet (25,000,000 m^{3})

Lake Union (Lushootseed: x̌ax̌čuʔ) (Note: Pronounced HAH-choh; lit. "small lake") is a freshwater lake located entirely within the city limits of Seattle, Washington, United States. It is a major part of the Lake Washington Ship Canal, which carries fresh water from the much larger Lake Washington on the east to Puget Sound on the west. The easternmost point of the lake is the Ship Canal Bridge, which carries Interstate 5 over the eastern arm of the lake and separates Lake Union from Portage Bay. Lake Union is the namesake of the neighborhoods located on three of its shores: Eastlake, Westlake and South Lake Union. Notable destinations on the lake include Lake Union Park, the Museum of History & Industry (MOHAI), and the Center for Wooden Boats on the southern shore and Gas Works Park on the northern shore.

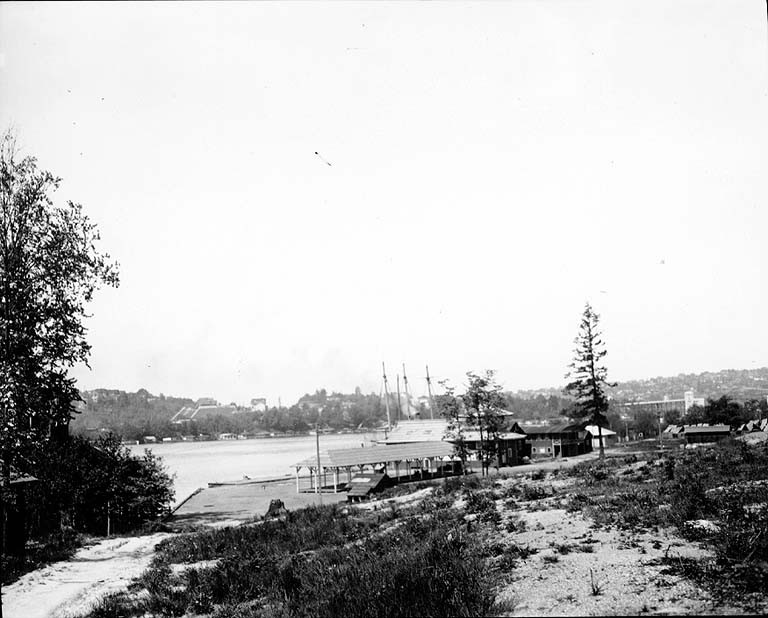
University of Washington campus frontage on Lake Union, 1919

The Aurora Bridge (officially the George Washington Memorial Bridge) carries State Route 99 over the western arm of Lake Union. The Aurora Bridge is so named because it carries Aurora Ave N down the western side of the lake. Lake Union's westernmost point can be considered the Fremont Cut, which is located just west of the Aurora Bridge and is spanned by the Fremont Bridge. The Fremont Bridge carries Fremont Ave N between the neighborhoods of Fremont and Queen Anne and separates Lake Union from the rest of the Lake Washington Ship Canal to the west.

== Description ==
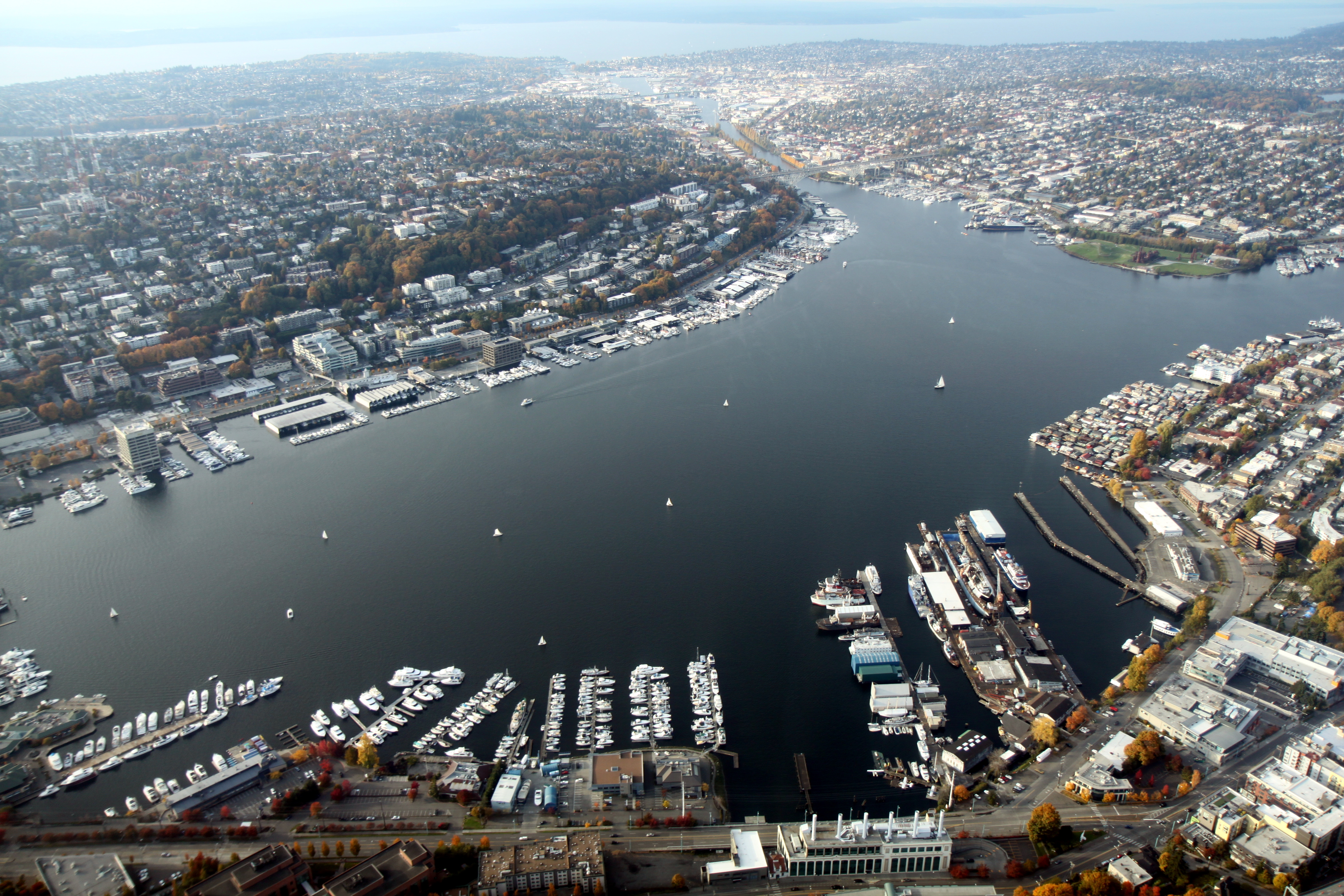
Lake Union flows into the Fremont Cut towards Puget Sound.

Lake Union is a natural lake in Seattle that lies north of the city's central business district. It is fully surrounded by urban neighborhoods and highways. Lake Union is the smaller of the two major lakes in Seattle, the other being Lake Washington.

Part of the Lake Washington Ship Canal system, water flows into the lake from Lake Washington through the Montlake Cut, and out via the Fremont Cut on its way to Puget Sound. Before the construction of the canal, Lake Union emptied into Salmon Bay via a creek which followed roughly the same course as the Fremont Cut does today.

Because of the connection via the Hiram M. Chittenden Locks to the salt water of Puget Sound, the water is brackish to a certain extent, which increases in the summer as the inflow rate from Lake Washington decreases and the locks open more frequently for pleasure craft.

== History ==
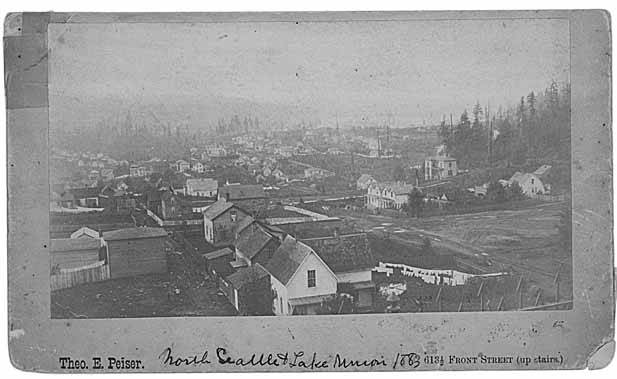
Residential area near by Lake Union in 1883

A glacial lake, its basin was dug 12,000 years ago by the Vashon glacier, which also created Lake Washington and Seattle's Green, Bitter, and Haller Lakes.

=== Name ===
In Lushootseed, the lake is known as x̌ax̌čuʔ, meaning "small lake." It is the diminutive form of the name of Lake Washington, x̌ačuʔ.

In Chinook Jargon, the trade language primarily used in the 19th century, it is called Tenas Chuck ("small water").

Lake Union received its present name from Thomas Mercer, who in 1854 correctly predicted that canals would someday join Lake Washington to Puget Sound in a "union of waters."

=== Pre-development ===
Lake Union was formed by the recession of the Vashon Glacier approximately 14,000 years before present.

== Geography ==
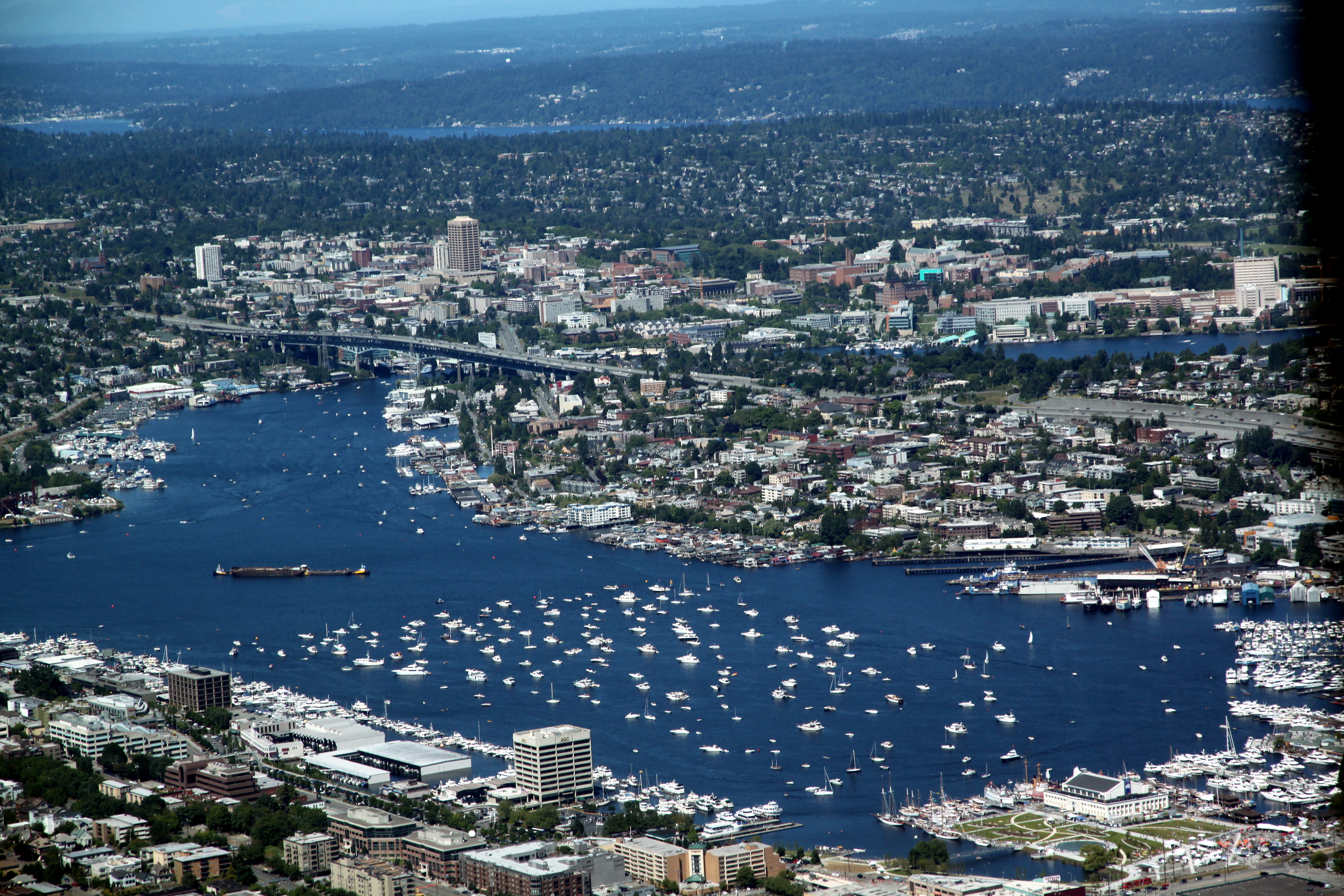
Aerial view of Lake Union, July 2011

Several Seattle neighborhoods take their name from the lake: Eastlake, Westlake, Northlake, and South Lake Union; and three major streets are named in relation to it: Westlake Avenue, which runs along its western shore from Downtown to the Fremont Bridge; Eastlake Avenue, which runs along its eastern shore from Cascade to the University District, and Northlake Way, which runs along its northern shore from the University District past Gas Works Park to the edge of Fremont.

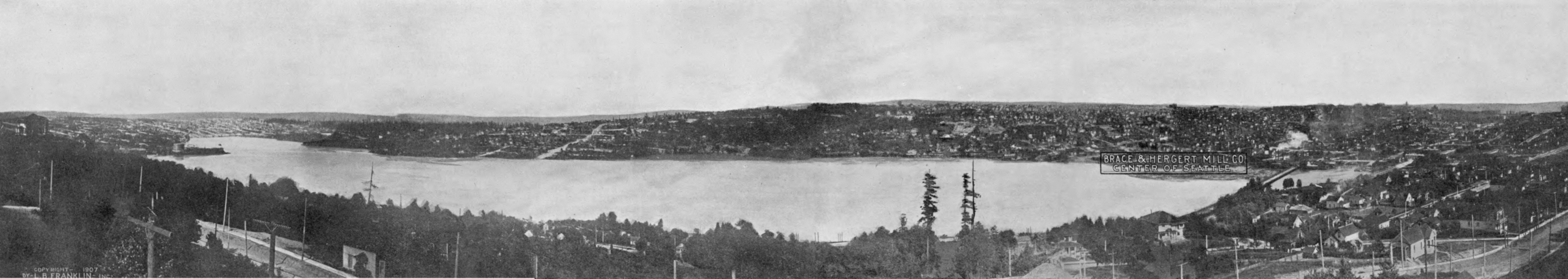
Lake Union, 1907, from Queen Anne Hill. Capitol Hill is straight ahead; the gas works (now Gas Works Park) can be seen at left, jutting into the lake.
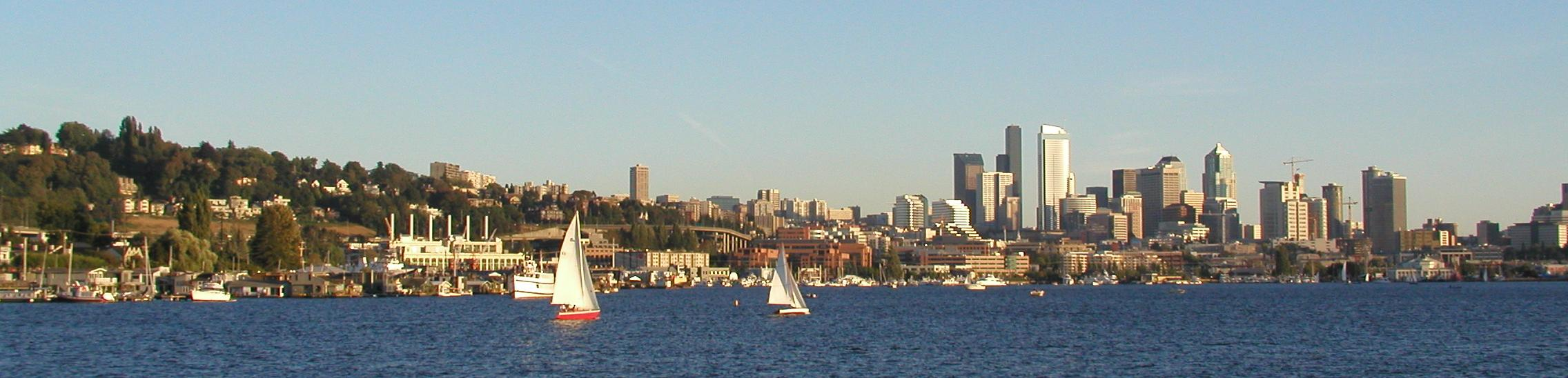
The view of Capitol Hill and Downtown Seattle from Lake Union

== Uses ==
Boeing began production on Lake Union in 1916, there had a hangar assembled the company's first product B & W Seaplane. Shipyards, wharves, and sawmills have also dotted the shore.

=== Floating homes ===
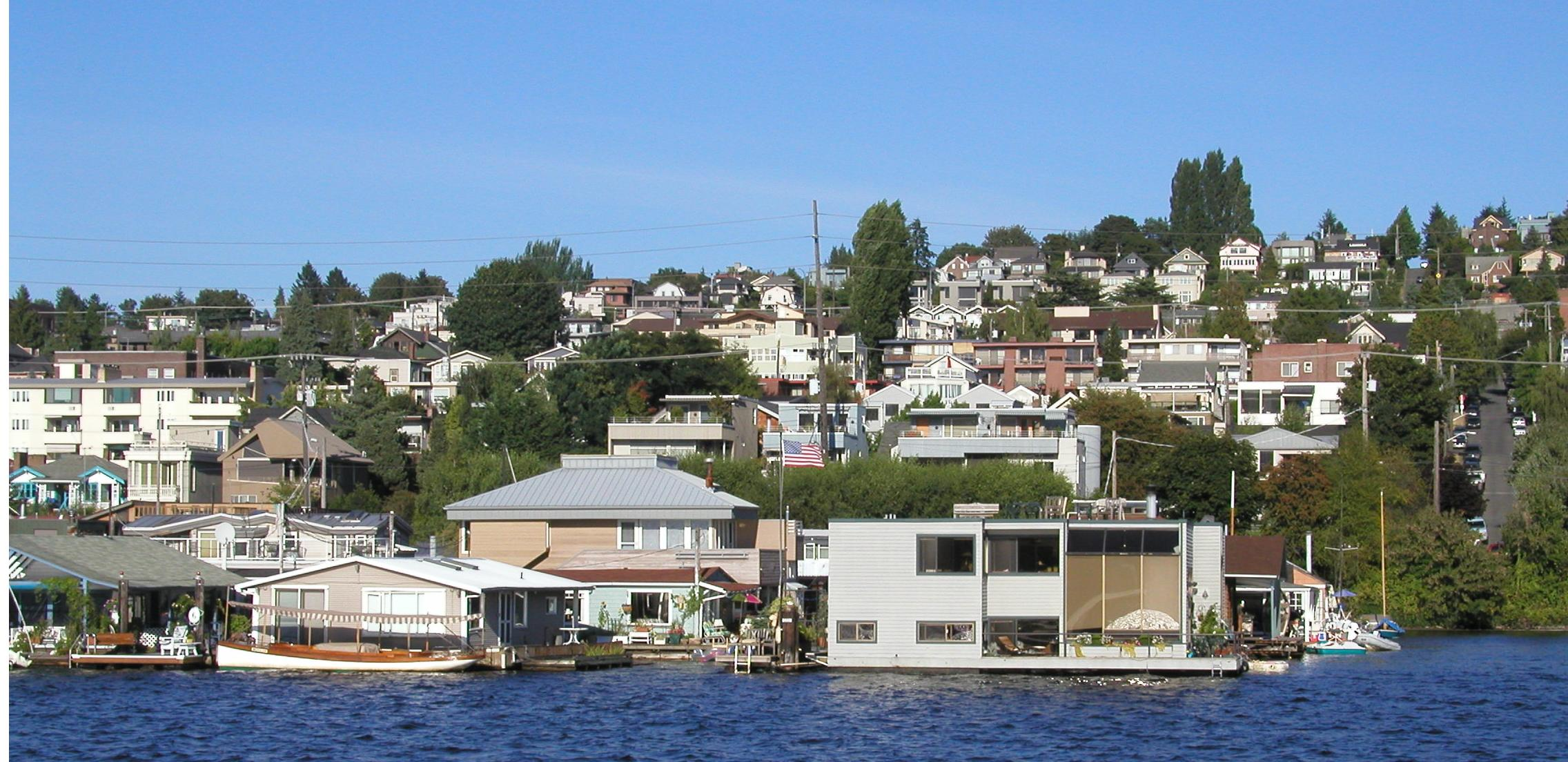
Floating homes on Lake Union's eastern shore

Floating homes line the east and west sides of Lake Union. In Sleepless in Seattle, the character played by Tom Hanks lived on one of these homes.

== Recreation ==
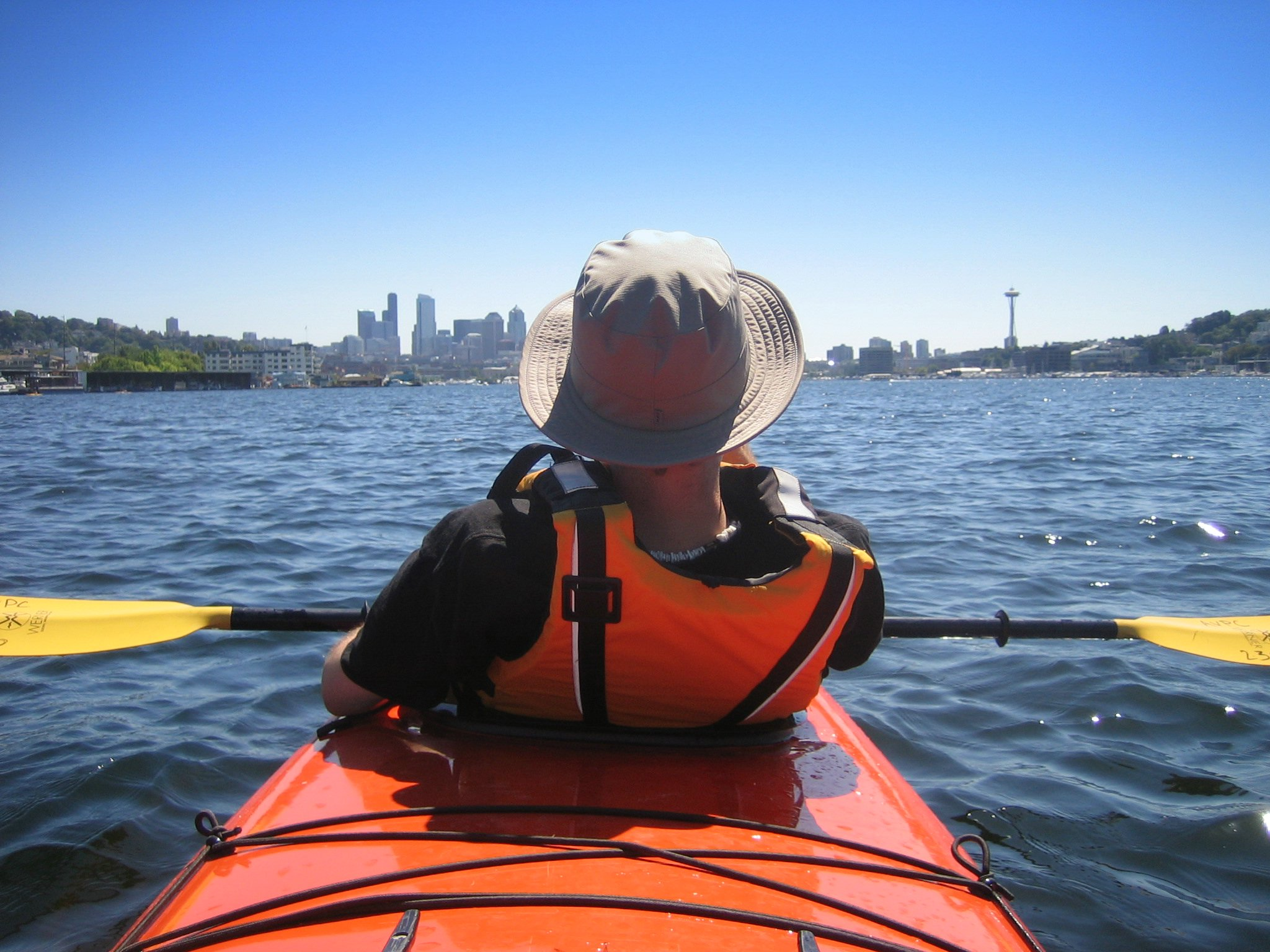
Kayaking on Lake Union with the Space Needle visible in the distance

Lake Union's proximity to and scenic views of the central Seattle and University District skylines make it a popular recreational spot. Seaplane operated by Kenmore Air and Seattle Seaplanes land and take off from the lake throughout the day. Pleasure boats from Lake Washington pass through on their way to Puget Sound. The Center for Wooden Boats holds a yearly wooden boat festival, while the annual Seattle Boat Show at the end of January demonstrates seacraft for sale on actual waters, in addition to its displays in the concourse of Lumen Field. The world-famous Duck Dodge sailboat races are run on Lake Union each Tuesday during the summer. Rowers in sweep and sculling boats use the lake year-round. Paddleboarding and kayaking are also popular on this lake.

=== Parks ===
Gas Works Park is the largest park on Lake Union and the most popular for Seattleites and visitors. It is the venue for summer concerts and Seattle's major Fourth of July fireworks show. Other parks ring the lake, clockwise around the compass from Gas Works which is nearly due north: North Passage Point Park, South Passage Point Park, Fairview Park, Terry Pettus Park, and South Lake Union Park.

=== Competitive rowing ===
Lake Union is home to several rowing centers and teams, including Holy Names Academy Crew, Lake Union Crew, Lake Washington Rowing Club and Pocock Rowing Center, all members of USRowing. Also rowing out of bodies of water attached to Lake Union are the Seattle Rowing Center and the Conibear Shellhouse, serving the Washington Huskies.

== Transportation ==
=== Seaplane base ===
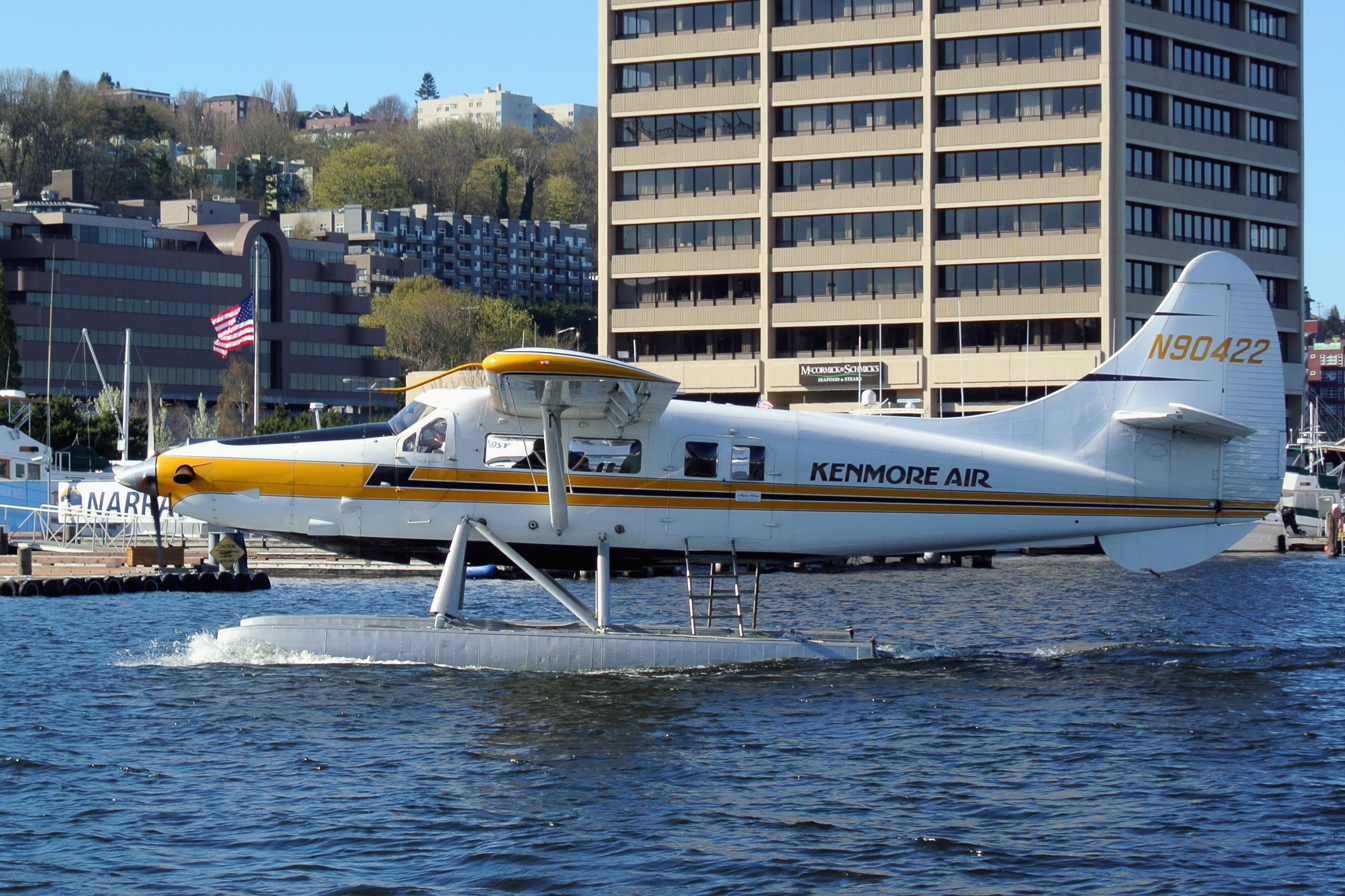
DHC-3 Otter floatplane of Kenmore Air on Lake Union

Lake Union is home to two seaplane bases: Kenmore Air Harbor Seaplane Base (IATA: LKE, FAA LID: W55), and Seattle Seaplanes (FAA LID: 0W0), located one nautical mile (1.85 km) north of the central business district of Seattle.
