= Portage Bay =

Bay in Seattle, Washington, US

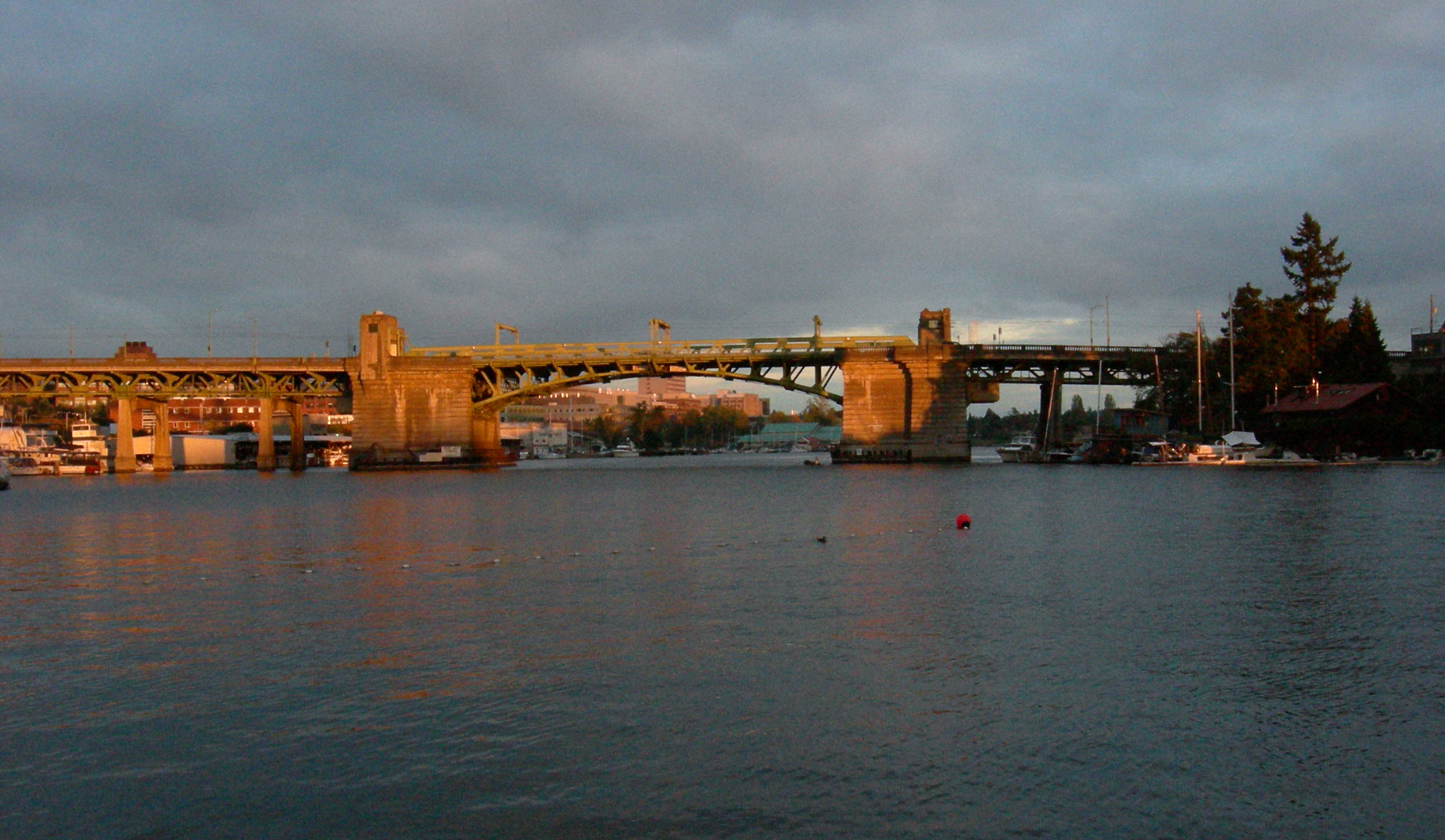
- Looking east across Portage Bay to University Bridge and beyond; the University of Washington's south campus can be seen under the bridge.

- Location of Portage Bay within the state of Washington
- Location: Seattle, Washington
- Coordinates: 47°38′50″N 122°18′49″W

Portage Bay is a body of water, often thought of as the eastern arm of Lake Union, that forms a part of the Lake Washington Ship Canal in Seattle, Washington.

To the east, Portage Bay is connected with Union Bay—a part of Lake Washington—by the Montlake Cut, over which spans the Montlake Bridge carrying State Route 513. To the north is the campus of the University of Washington. To the west, Portage Bay is spanned by the University Bridge, which carries Eastlake Avenue between Eastlake and the University District. Its westernmost limit can be said to be the Ship Canal Bridge, which carries Interstate 5 over the water; past this bridge, the body of water is deemed to be Lake Union. In the southern portion, Portage Bay is spanned by the Portage Bay Viaduct, which carries State Route 520 from the Eastlake/Capitol Hill district to Montlake.

Portage Bay was named in 1913 because of the portage across the Montlake Isthmus that used to be necessary to move logs from Union Bay to Lake Union before the construction of the Ship Canal. The bay is home to two yacht clubs, the Seattle and the Queen City, and many houseboats, as well as the Northwest Fisheries Science Center of the National Marine Fisheries Service and the University of Washington's College of Ocean and Fishery Science.

== History ==
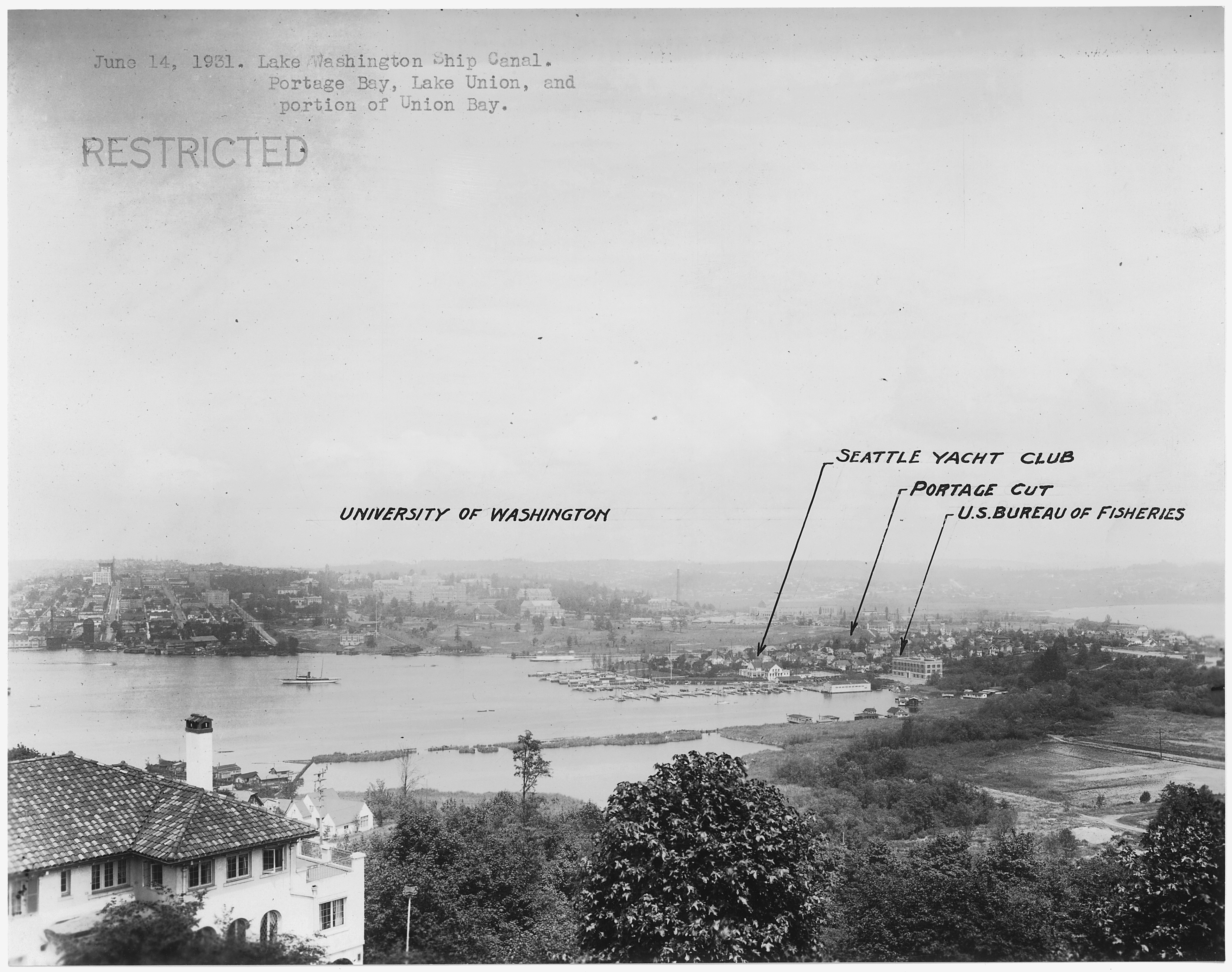
Portage Bay, July 1931

In 1860 (or, more likely, some time slightly later), landowner Harvey Pike tried to cut the first ditch connecting Lake Washington's Union Bay and Lake Union's Portage Bay, but gave up and deeded his land to the Lake Washington Ship Canal Company, which built a transiting rail line for portaging goods between the lakes. This rail line continued use until 1878. In 1883, David Denny and Thomas Burke had a canal built for floating logs.

Cheshiahud lived and carved canoes on the shores of Portage Bay for many years from 1885. In 1909, the Pay Streak, a vaudeville and sideshows section of the Alaska–Yukon–Pacific Exposition, ended in a gondola ramp and esplanade on the north shores of Portage Bay.

For 14 years following World War II, the Fantome was stranded in Portage Bay pending payment to King County of back taxes.

A university police station was located on the north shore of Portage Bay until the 2010s, when it was demolished to make way for a public park. Fritz Hedges Waterway Park opened in October 2020, using funding from the Washington State Department of Transportation as part of remediation for the State Route 520 expansion program.

== Neighborhood ==
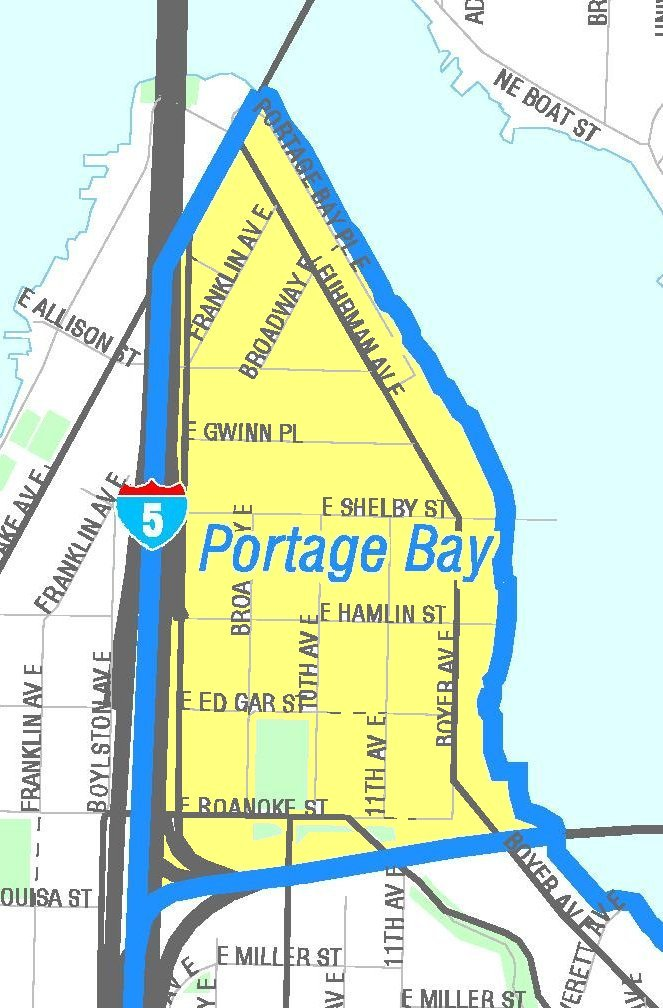
Map of the neighborhood named for the bay

The small residential neighborhood of Portage Bay is located on the southwestern shore of the bay. It is bounded on the south by State Route 520 and on the west by Interstate 5, and features one of the larger remaining enclaves of Houseboats in Seattle.

== See also ==
- Fritz Hedges Waterway Park, also known as Portage Bay Park
