= Ship Canal Bridge =

Highway bridge carrying Interstate 5 in Seattle, Washington

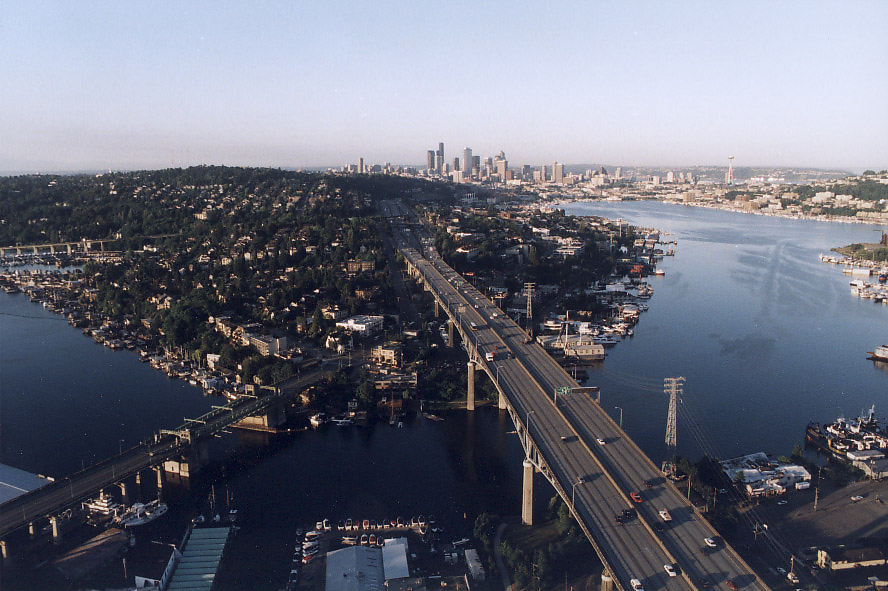
- The Ship Canal Bridge looking south towards downtown. To the left is the University Bridge.
- Coordinates: 47.65309°N 122.32252°W
- Carries: I-5 (8 lanes, 4 reversible express lanes)
- Crosses: Portage Bay
- Locale: Seattle, Washington

Characteristics
- Design: Double-deck truss
- Total length: 4,429 ft (1,350 m)
- Width: 119 ft (36 m) (top deck)
- Clearance below: 182 ft (55 m)

History
- Opened: December 18, 1962

Location
- Interactive map of Ship Canal Bridge

The Ship Canal Bridge is a double-deck steel truss bridge that carries Interstate 5 (I-5) over Seattle's Portage Bay (part of the Lake Washington Ship Canal, after which it is named) between Capitol Hill and the University District. The canal below connects Lake Union with Lake Washington. Construction was completed in 1961 and the bridge opened to traffic on December 18, 1962. It is 4,429 ft (1,350 meters) long, stands 182 feet above the canal and is 119 feet wide at the upper deck. It was the largest bridge of its kind in the Northwest when it first opened. The bridge is double-decked, with the upper deck carrying traffic in both directions and the lower deck (the express lanes) carrying traffic southbound in the morning and northbound in the afternoon.

Other nearby bridges include University Bridge, Montlake Bridge, and George Washington Memorial Bridge (the Aurora Ave. bridge).
