= Shoreline street ends in Seattle =

Small public beaches at the end of every street

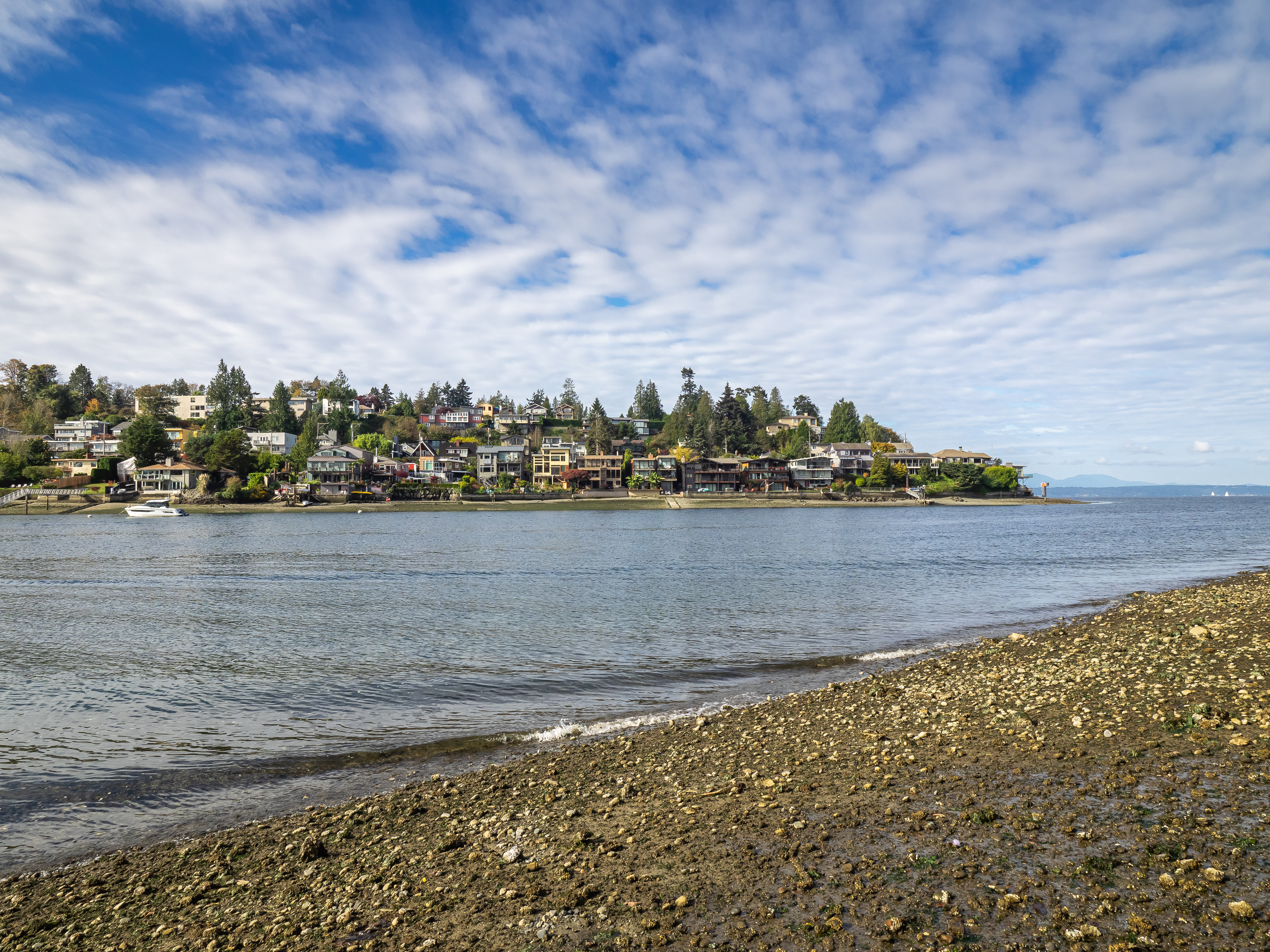
One of the few publicly accessible beaches in Ballard on Salmon Bay can be reached from the NW 57th St Shoreline street end. Looking toward Magnolia on the opposite shore.

In 1996, the city of Seattle, Washington adopted a resolution to preserve shoreline street ends (sometimes referred to as SSEs) throughout the city as public rights-of-way, to allow improvements for public uses and access. This resolution gave a broad outline of considerations that would apply to public access improvements to shoreline street ends and to removing private encroachments and severely limiting future permits for private uses of street ends. Three years later, this was enhanced with a statement, "Fees for use of shoreline street ends may take into consideration City policy of discouraging encroachments inconsistent with the public right of access to shorelines and may be included in the schedule of fees for use of public places under the jurisdiction of Seattle Transportation."

Seattle borders Puget Sound (most notably Elliott Bay, the city's main port) and Lake Washington; the lower Duwamish River and its industrialized estuary known as the Duwamish Waterway flow through the city to Elliott Bay; the Lake Washington Ship Canal bisects the city and includes Lake Union (580 acres (2.3 km^{2}) in its own right); and there are numerous smaller lakes in the city, so many streets end in water. Since the adoption of this resolution, it has been city policy to preserve these numerous street ends for public access. Over the decades since, this has resulted not only in preserved public rights of way, but also in numerous new public parks.

As of 2016, seven of the 149 recognized sites (nine of them along the Duwamish Waterway) still lacked public access. 88 were designated in the city's fact sheet as "worth a visit," and 54 as "not yet ready for visitors." Nine sites, overlapping the last two categories, were in the design and development stage. "[N]early two-thirds" were described as being "in need of improvement, overgrown, or hav[ing] private encroachments."

== History ==
Upon becoming a state in 1889, Washington raised money by selling public tidelands. By the time the state decided in 1971 to suspend further such sales, only about 40% of tidelands remained under public ownership. In 1987, the state passed a law limiting vacations of streets abutting bodies of water. This law favors "Port, beach or water access, boat moorage, launching sites, park, public view, recreation, or education" as getting automatic precedence over other uses.

While by then Seattle had several parks adjacent to the water (e.g., Alki Beach Park, Golden Gardens Park, Seward Park), there were (and are) significant gaps. Community groups pushed to increase public shoreline access by improving street ends where public rights of way are platted into the water. As the Seattle Post-Intelligencer put it in 2007, "city maps showed roads drawn right into Lake Washington, Lake Union, Puget Sound, Shilshole Bay, Portage Bay, Elliott Bay and other Seattle waterways." In 1996, the city identified 149 such shoreline street ends and designated them for "public uses and enjoyment." A later ordinance established permit fees to discourage private uses of these lands, and directed the revenue from these fees toward the maintenance and improvement of shoreline street ends. The result has been the creation and maintenance of a wide variety of public spaces: beaches, docks in industrial areas, expansions of existing parks, some providing habitat for native species, others simply providing water views.

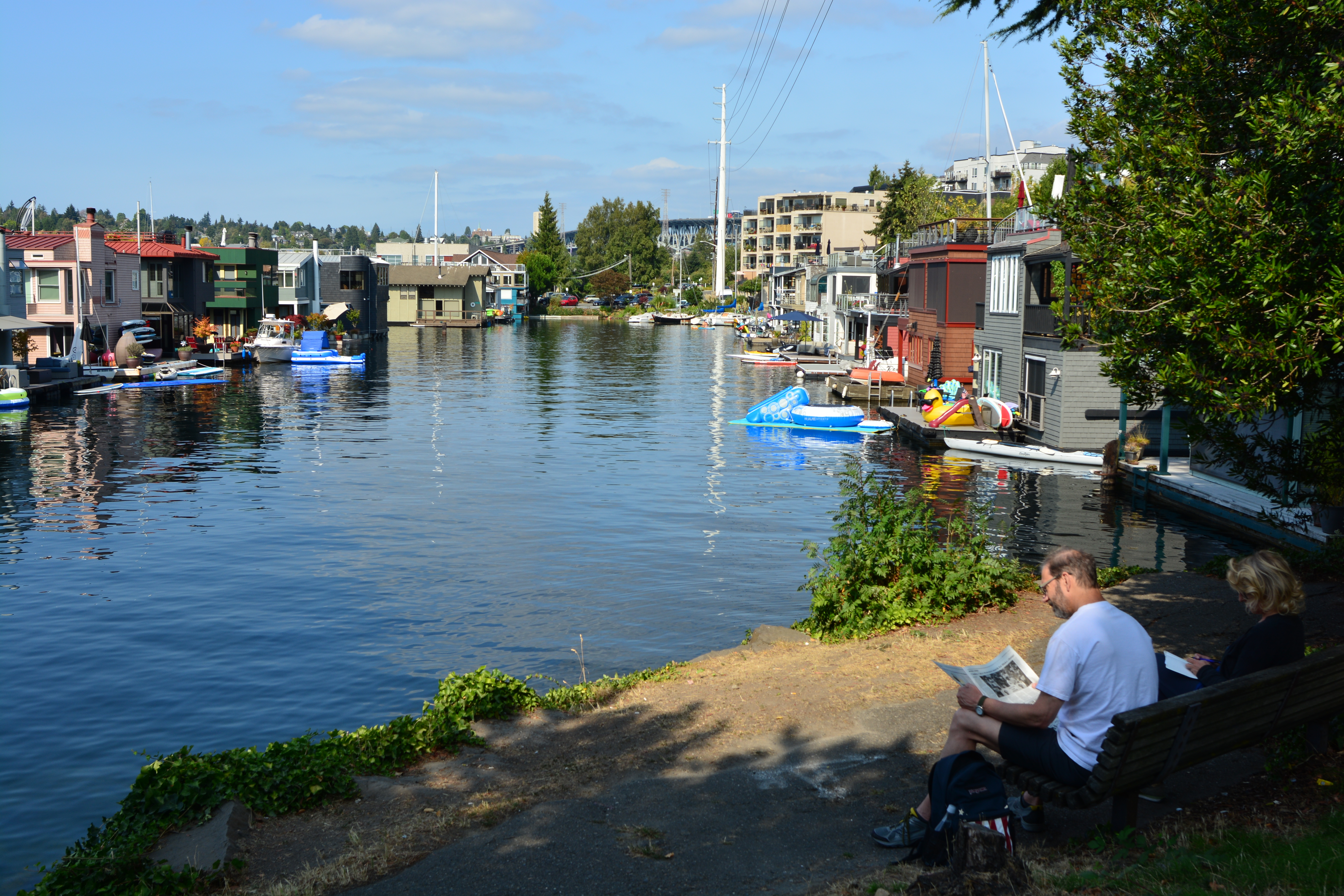
Looking north from E. Roanoke Mini Park toward E. Hamlin Street. E. Edgar Street is about halfway between; there is an easy land route from E. Edgar Street to E. Roanoke Street.

Public access to Seattle's waterfronts had not always been such a priority. One example can be found in the Eastlake neighborhood, where a longstanding foot and bicycle route along the east side of Lake Union was disrupted by a series of permits issued between 1957 and 1992, which allowed buildings and a marina to build into the historic right of way, to the point of completely preempting public passage along the shore from E. Edgar Street to E. Hamlin Street.

Not all of these transitions have been easy. When the program began, many of these street ends had been de facto integrated into neighbors' yards and business areas, with access limited by fences and hedges, and with people having placed gardens, children's swing sets, and even hot tubs; some business had annexed them for equipment storage. In the late 1990s, as Seattle was establishing regulations for shoreline street ends, the citywide group Friends of Street Ends formed to support the transition of these back to public use. Meanwhile, many people living near the designated SSEs objected to "noise, traffic and people wandering into their yards."

For example, in 2013, the owners of the two properties adjoining Northeast 130th Street Beach, now known as Lake City Beach Park, discovered that 82 years earlier the title to the land had not properly been conveyed to the City, and they proceeded to fence it off as part of their respective properties. Using the threat of eminent domain, the City reached a settlement with the owners and—after nearly seven years—regained control of the land.

== List of official shoreline street ends ==
The following list uses the official numbering used by the City of Seattle. The list of 149 official SSEs remains unchanged since their original designation in 1996. Note that street names are not necessarily unique: many Seattle streets hit bodies of water more than once.

Number	Name	Image	Status	Location	Notes
1	98th St SW		"Worth a visit"	West Seattle on Puget Sound	
2	SW Brace Point Dr		"Worth a visit"	West Seattle, on Puget Sound	
3	SW Barton St		"Worth a visit"	West Seattle, on Puget Sound	Immediately north of the Fauntleroy Ferry Terminal. Officially part of the parks system, as Cove Park.
4	SW Alaska St		"Worth a visit"	West Seattle, on Puget Sound	
5	SW Carroll St		"Worth a visit"	West Seattle, on Puget Sound	
6	SW Andover St		"Worth a visit"	West Seattle, on Puget Sound	
7	SW Spokane St		"Worth a visit"	West Seattle, on Puget Sound	
8	SW Atlantic Pl	[more images]	"Not yet ready"	West Seattle, on Elliott Bay	
9	Fairmount Ave SW	[more images]	"Not yet ready"	West Seattle, on Elliott Bay	
10	SW Bronson Way		"Worth a visit"	West Seattle, on Elliott Bay	
11	SW Hinds St		"Not yet ready"	West Seattle, West Duwamish Waterway	
12	Chelan Ave SW		"Not yet ready"	West Seattle, West Duwamish Waterway	
13	SW Spokane St		"Not yet ready"	West Seattle, West Duwamish Waterway	
14	SW Dakota St		No public access	West Seattle, Duwamish Waterway	
15	SW Lander St		"Not yet ready"	Harbor Island West Duwamish Waterway	
16	SW Spokane St		"Not yet ready"	Harbor Island, West Duwamish Waterway	
17	Chelan Ave SW		No public access	Harbor Island, West Duwamish Waterway	
18	SW Spokane St		"Worth a visit"	Harbor Island, East Duwamish Waterway	
19	SW Spokane St		"Worth a visit"	Industrial District, East Duwamish Waterway	
20	S Forest St		No public access	Industrial District, East Duwamish Waterway	
21	SW Idaho St		No public access	West Seattle, Duwamish Waterway	
22	SW Alaska St		"Worth a visit"	West Seattle, Duwamish Waterway	
23	SW Edmunds St		"Worth a visit"	West Seattle, Duwamish Waterway	
24	S Oregon St	[more images]	"Worth a visit"	Industrial District, Duwamish Waterway	
25	Diagonal Ave S	[more images]	"Worth a visit"	Industrial District, Duwamish Waterway	
26	S Fidalgo St		"Worth a visit"	Georgetown, Duwamish Waterway	
27	S Front St		"Not yet ready"	Georgetown, Duwamish Waterway	
28	S River St	[more images]	"Worth a visit"	Georgetown, Duwamish Waterway	
29	SW Michigan St		"Not yet ready"	West Seattle, Duwamish Waterway	
30	2nd Ave S		"Not yet ready"	West Seattle, Duwamish Waterway	
31	5th Ave S		"Not yet ready"	South Park Duwamish Waterway	
32	S Riverside Dr		"Not yet ready"	South Park, Duwamish Waterway	
33	7th Ave S	[more images]	(opened 2023)	South Park, Duwamish Waterway	
34	S Riverside Dr		"Worth a visit"	South Park, Duwamish Waterway	
35	8th Ave S	[more images]	"Worth a visit"	South Park, Duwamish Waterway	t̓ałt̓ałucid Park and Shoreline Habitat
36	S Chicago St		No public access	South Park, Duwamish Waterway	
37	10th Ave S		"Worth a visit"	South Park, Duwamish Waterway	
38	S Monroe St	[more images]	(within a park)	South Park, Duwamish Waterway	Now part of Duwamish Waterway Park
39	75th Ave S		"Worth a visit"	South Rainier, Lake Washington	
40	72nd Ave S		"Worth a visit"	South Rainier, Lake Washington	
41	S Cooper St		"Not yet ready"	South Rainier, Lake Washington	
42	S Norfolk St		"Not yet ready"	South Rainier, Lake Washington	
43	S Perry St		"Not yet ready"	South Rainier, Lake Washington	
44	S Carver St		"Not yet ready"	South Rainier, Lake Washington	
45	S Willow St	[more images]	"Worth a visit"	Seward Park, Lake Washington	
46	S Brighton St	[more images]	"Worth a visit"	Seward Park, Lake Washington	
47	S Warsaw St	[more images]	"Worth a visit"	Seward Park, Lake Washington	
48	S Eddy St		"Worth a visit"	Seward Park, Lake Washington	
49	S Holgate St		"Not yet ready"	Mt. Baker/Leschi Lake Washington	
50	S Massachusetts St		"Not yet ready"	Mt. Baker/Leschi, Lake Washington	
51	S Atlantic St		"Not yet ready"	Mt. Baker/Leschi, Lake Washington	
52	S Irving St		"Worth a visit"	Mt. Baker/Leschi, Lake Washington	
53	S Judkins St		"Worth a visit"	Mt. Baker/Leschi, Lake Washington	
54	S Norman St	[more images]	"Worth a visit"	Mt. Baker/Leschi, Lake Washington	
55	S Charles St	[more images]	"Worth a visit"	Mt. Baker/Leschi, Lake Washington	
56	S Dearborn St	[more images]	"Worth a visit"	Mt. Baker/Leschi, Lake Washington	
57	S King St	[more images]	"Worth a visit"	Mt. Baker/Leschi, Lake Washington	
58	S Jackson St	[more images]	"Worth a visit"	Mt. Baker/Leschi, Lake Washington	Public access to a parking lot as a viewpoint
59	S Main St	[more images]	"Worth a visit"	Mt. Baker/Leschi, Lake Washington	
60	E Pine St		"Worth a visit"	Denny-Blaine, Lake Washington	
61	E Olive Ln		"Worth a visit"	Denny-Blaine, Lake Washington	
62	E Howell St		"Worth a visit"	Denny-Blaine, Lake Washington	
63	E Harrison St		"Worth a visit"	Denny-Blaine, Lake Washington	
64	E Mercer St		"Not yet ready"	Denny-Blaine/Madison Park, Lake Washington	
65	E Prospect St	[more images]	"Worth a visit"	Denny-Blaine/Madison Park, Lake Washington	Also known as Prospect Nature Preserve.
66	E Highland Dr	[more images]	"Worth a visit"	Denny-Blaine/Madison Park, Lake Washington	
67	E Lee St	[more images]	"Worth a visit"	Denny-Blaine/Madison Park, Lake Washington	
68	37th Ave E	[more images]	"Worth a visit"	Madison Park on Union Bay	a.k.a. Beaver Lodge Sanctuary
69	E Roanoke St		"Not yet ready"	West side of Portage Bay	
70	E Edgar St	[more images]	"Worth a visit"	West side of Portage Bay	a.k.a. Astrid's Park, though it does not have official status as a city park.
71	E Hamlin St	[more images]	"Worth a visit"	West side of Portage Bay	
72	E Shelby St	[more images]	"Worth a visit"	West side of Portage Bay	
73	E Allison St		"Not yet ready"	West side of Portage Bay	
74	E Martin St		"Not yet ready"	West side of Portage Bay	
75	University Bridge		"Not yet ready"	Portage Bay/Lake Union	
76	Fuhrman Ave E	[more images]	"Worth a visit"	Lake Union/Portage Bay	Combined with South Passage Point Park (under Interstate 5 Ship Canal Bridge)
77	E Martin St		"Worth a visit"	Lake Union/Portage Bay	Good Turn Park
78	E Allison St	[more images]	"Worth a visit"	Lake Union/Portage Bay	
79	E Hamlin St	[more images]	"Worth a visit"	Lake Union/Portage Bay	
80	E Edgar St		"Not yet ready"	Eastlake, Lake Union	
81	E Roanoke St	[more images]	"Worth a visit"	Eastlake, Lake Union	Roanoke Street Mini-Park
82	E Louisa St	[more images]	"Worth a visit"	Eastlake, Lake Union	
83	E Boston St		"Worth a visit"	Eastlake, Lake Union	
84	E Newton St	[more images]	"Worth a visit"	Eastlake, Lake Union	Terry Pettus Park
85	Yale Ave N		"Worth a visit"	Eastlake, Lake Union	
86	Terry Ave N	[more images]	N/A/	South Lake Union	Incorporated into Lake Union Park
87	Galer St		"Worth a visit"	Westlake, Lake Union	
88	Blaine St		"Worth a visit"	Westlake, Lake Union	
89	Crockett St	[more images]	"Worth a visit"	Westlake, Lake Union	
90	McGraw St	[more images]	"Worth a visit"	Westlake, Lake Union	
91	5th Avenue N		"Not yet ready"	Near south foot of Aurora Bridge on Lake Union	
92	Fremont Bridge		"Worth a visit"	South side of Fremont Cut	along South Ship Canal Trail
93	3rd Ave N/Etruria St		"Worth a visit"	South side of Fremont Cut	along South Ship Canal Trail
94	Cremona St		"Worth a visit"	South side of Fremont Cut	along South Ship Canal Trail
95	Bertona St		"Worth a visit"	South side of Fremont Cut	along South Ship Canal Trail
96	Queen Anne Ave N		"Worth a visit"	South side of Fremont Cut	along South Ship Canal Trail
97	3rd Ave W		"Worth a visit"	South side of Fremont Cut	a.k.a. West Ewing Mini Park, along South Ship Canal Trail
98	6th Ave W		"Not yet ready"	South side of Fremont Cut	
99	Gilman Ave W		"Worth a visit"	Magnolia on Salmon Bay	Immediately west of Commodore Park, effectively part of the park.
100	W Cramer St		"Worth a visit"	Magnolia on Salmon Bay	
101	W Sheridan St		"Worth a visit"	Magnolia on Salmon Bay	
102	47th Ave W		"Not yet ready"	Magnolia on Shilshole Bay	
103	48th Ave W		"Not yet ready"	Magnolia on Elliott Bay	
104	W Bertona St		"Not yet ready"	Magnolia on Elliott Bay	
105	W Dravus St		"Not yet ready"	Magnolia on Elliott Bay	
106	W Barrett St		"Not yet ready"	Magnolia on Elliott Bay	
107	W Armour St		"Not yet ready"	Magnolia on Elliott Bay	
108	W Raye St		?	Magnolia on Elliott Bay	
109	W McGraw St		"Worth a visit"	Magnolia on Elliott Bay	accessible from Perkins Lane. At low tide you can access Fourmile Rock, depicted here.
110	32nd Ave W	[more images]	"Worth a visit"	Magnolia on Elliott Bay	a.k.a. 32nd Avenue West Park, 32nd Avenue West Beach Access
111	30th Ave W	[more images]	"Worth a visit"	Magnolia on Elliott Bay	A.k.a. Magnolia Tidelands Park, reachable from the Elliott Bay Marina
112	W Thomas St		"Worth a visit"	border between Myrtle Edwards Park and Centennial Park on Elliott Bay	
113	Bay St		"Worth a visit"	border between Olympic Sculpture Park and Myrtle Edwards Park on Elliott Bay	"pocket beach"
114	Broad St		"Worth a visit"	south tip of Olympic Sculpture Park on Elliott Bay	"pocket beach"
115	Vine St		"Worth a visit"	north side of The Edgewater hotel on Elliott Bay	
116	Battery St		"Worth a visit"	between Pier 66 and the Edgewater on Elliott Bay	just a stretch of sidewalk atop the Alaskan Way seawall
117	Virginia St		"Not yet ready"	immediately north of Pier 63 on Elliott Bay	
118	University St		"Worth a visit"	south side of Pier 57 on Elliott Bay	
119	Madison St		"Worth a visit"	adjacent to Fire Station No. 5 on Elliott Bay	
120	S Washington St	[more images]	As of December 2022: closed since 2014	former Washington Street Public Boat Landing Facility on Elliott Bay	
121	S Holgate St		no public access	part of Terminal 30, a bit south of Jack Perry Memorial Park	
122	NE 135th St		no public access	Lake City on Lake Washington	
123	NE 130th St		"Worth a visit"	Lake City on Lake Washington	Lake City Beach Park
124	NE 90th Pl		"Not yet ready"	just south of Matthews Beach Park on Lake Washington	
125	NE 85th St		"Not yet ready"	Sand Point on Lake Washington	
126	NE 43rd St	[more images]	"Worth a visit"	Laurelhurst on Lake Washington	
127	51st Ave NE		"Worth a visit"	Laurelhurst on Lake Washington	
128	NE 33rd St		"Not yet ready"	Laurelhurst on Lake Washington	
129	NE 31st St	[more images]	"Worth a visit"	Laurelhurst on Lake Washington	
130	NE 31st St	[more images]	"Worth a visit"	Laurelhurst on Union Bay	
131	NE 32nd St		"Not yet ready"	Laurelhurst on Lake Washington on Union Bay	
132	Brooklyn Ave NE	[more images]	"Worth a visit"	University District on Portage Bay	Adjacent to (and effectively part of) Sakuma Viewpoint, next to Fritz Hedges Park (formerly Portage Bay Park)
133	Eastlake Pl NE		"Not yet ready"	University District on Lake Union	under University Bridge
134	Latona Ave NE		"Worth a visit"	Northlake, Lake Union	
135	Sunnyside Ave N		"Worth a visit"	Northlake, Lake Union	
136	Fremont Bridge		"Worth a visit"	under the Fremont Bridge on the north side	
137	NW 39th St		"Not yet ready"	Fremont/Ballard ("Frelard") on the Fremont Cut	
138	6th Ave NW		"Not yet ready"	"Frelard", on the Fremont Cut	limited public access
139	NW 40th St		"Not yet ready"	"Frelard", on the Fremont Cut	
140	11th Ave NW		"Worth a visit"	Ballard on Salmon Bay	
141	14th Ave NW		"Worth a visit"	Ballard on Salmon Bay	a.k.a. 14th Avenue NW Boat Ramp
142	15th Ave NW		"Not yet ready"	Ballard on Salmon Bay	under the Ballard Bridge
143	20th Ave NW		"Worth a visit"	Ballard on Salmon Bay	
144	24th Ave NW		"Worth a visit"	Ballard on Salmon Bay	
145	28th Ave NW		"Worth a visit"	Ballard on Salmon Bay	
146	34th Ave NW		"Worth a visit"	Ballard on Salmon Bay	
147	36th Ave NW	[more images]	"Worth a visit"	Ballard on Salmon Bay	
148	NW 57th St	[more images]	"Worth a visit"	Ballard on Salmon Bay	beach access
149	NW 60th St		"Worth a visit"	Ballard on Shilshole Bay	NW 60th Street Viewpoint

== Other shoreline street ends ==
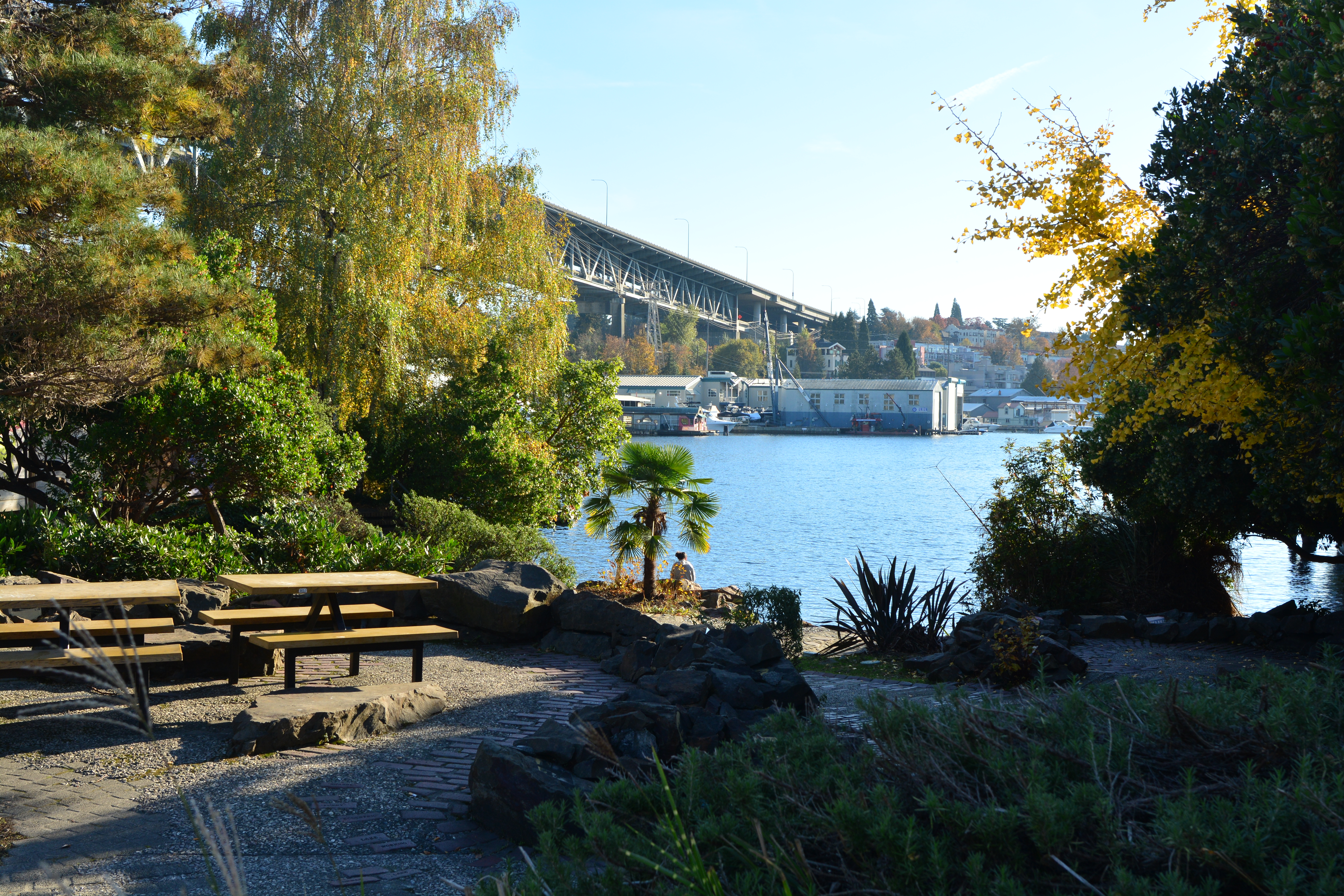
Waterway 15 on North Lake Union, 2022

Besides the 149 officially recognized shoreline street ends, there are numerous other places where waterfront public access is available at the end of a street in Seattle. Some of these, such as Lynn Street Mini Park in Eastlake on Lake Union, predate the ordinance. Others are designated as "waterways", open to the public based on longstanding boat access rights of way. Examples of this are Waterway No. 1, a former ferry landing at the foot of NE 35th Street in Laurelhurst on Union Bay and the elaborately landscaped Waterway 15 immediately west of Ivar's Salmon House at the foot of 4th Ave NE on the north shore of Lake Union/Portage Bay. Others remain in a bit of a limbo, such as Gateway Park North, the street end of 8th Avenue South in Georgetown on the northeast side of the Duwamish Waterway, open to the public but undeveloped, with jurisdictional issues still being sorted out.
