= Stone Avenue Bridge =

Former bridge in Seattle

Coordinates: 47°38′45″N 122°20′35″W

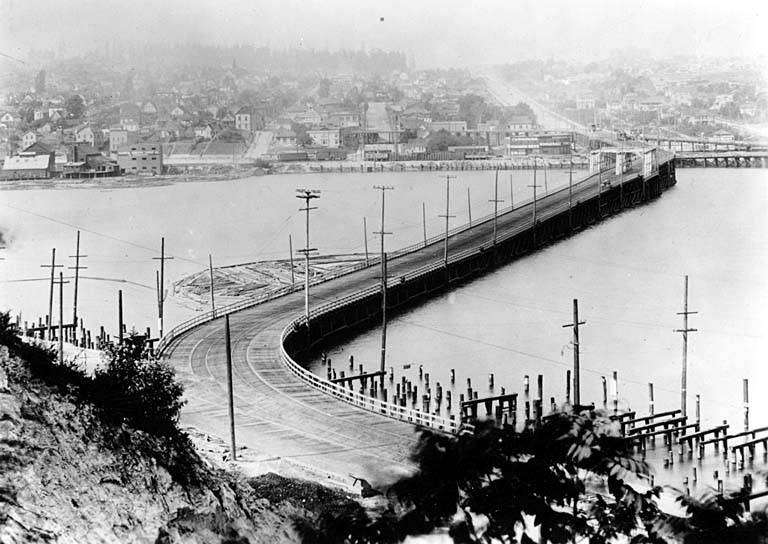
The Stone Avenue Bridge, as seen from Queen Anne, circa 1915

The Stone Avenue Bridge was a bridge in Seattle that connected Stone Avenue (now Stone Way North) in Wallingford with Westlake Avenue just north of Halladay Street. Its northern terminus was in the area of what today is North 34th Street and North 35th Street. It was a temporary replacement for the Fremont Bridge during the construction of the Lake Washington Ship Canal and was a fixed bridge; during its operation no ships with tall masts could enter or exit Lake Union.

The Stone Avenue Bridge was 2,700 feet (820 m) long and included two lanes for cars and wagons, two streetcar tracks, and two sidewalks. An 80-foot (24 m) span at the north end allowed vessels up to 25 feet (7.6 m) tall to pass underneath. Its streetcar tracks were used for routes that normally traversed the previous Fremont Bridge when that bridge collapsed in 1914.

The bridge opened on May 31, 1911, and was demolished in June 1917 after the new Fremont Bridge opened. No visible evidence of the bridge remains.
