= 130th Street =

130th Street may refer to:

- 130th Street (Manhattan), a street in the Harlem neighborhood of Manhattan, New York, and home to Astor Row
- 130th Street (IRT Ninth Avenue Line), a defunct station of the New York City Subway system

== See also ==
- NE 130th Street station, a proposed station on Sound Transit's Lynnwood Link Extension in Seattle
- Northeast 130th Street Beach, formally known as Lake City Beach Park, a public beach in Seattle
