= Thomas Mercer =

American pioneer, 19th century Seattle historical figure

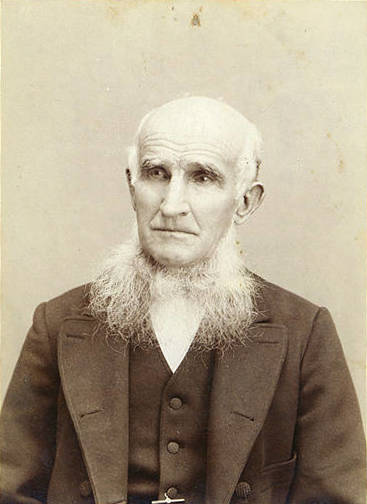
- Thomas Mercer c. 1890

King County Commissioner
- In office January 1, 1854 – July 1, 1858
- Preceded by: Arthur A. Denny
- Succeeded by: John H. Nagle

Personal details
- Born: March 11, 1813 Harrison County, Ohio, U.S.
- Died: May 25, 1898 (aged 85) Seattle, Washington, U.S.

Judge Thomas Mercer (March 11, 1813 – May 25, 1898) was a pioneer associated with the early history of Seattle. Seattle's Mercer Street and Mercer Island in Lake Washington bear his name.

== Biography ==
=== Early life ===
Mercer was born in Harrison County, Ohio on March 11, 1813, and was the eldest son of Aaron and Jane (Dickerson) Mercer, themselves born in Virginia and Pennsylvania, respectively. Aaron Mercer moved to Ohio in boyhood, being among the pioneers of that country. He learned the process of manufacturing woolen cloths and blankets and then operated his own factory very successfully for a number of years.

=== Illinois ===
In 1834 he was among the pioneer settlers at Princeton, Bureau County, Illinois. The eldest of fourteen, Thomas's education was chiefly in the school of necessity. As labor was the chief occupation of the pioneer, and in the noble army of workers Judge Mercer has been arrayed throughout his life, he was a bright, active boy, quick in mathematics and mechanical work.

His boyhood was passed in the factory of his father, and with his systematic methods and recognized ability he became foreman at the age of fourteen and operated the factory up to 1834, when the family removed to Illinois and engaged in farming. In 1830 young Mercer started a store in a little, old log cabin in Princeton, pursuing this enterprise for a year, before abandoning it because of the close confinement it entailed.

He then returned to farming. In 1837 he took part in the division of Putnam County and the organization of Bureau County. Elected clerk of the new county, he soon relinquished the job, which paid only 25 cents a day, to someone else.

=== Marriage ===
Mercer was married in Princeton in 1838 to Nancy Brigham, who was from New Hampshire. He then continued farming up to 1851, when he sold out, settled up his affairs, and in April 1852, with his wife and four children, left his Illinois home, and with horse teams crossed the plains to Oregon. In the same train were Dexter Horton and William H. Shoudy, both of Seattle. On this trip, Mrs. Mercer fell ill in The Dalles and died in the Cascade Range, leaving a bereaved husband and four small children, the eldest being not quite 14.

=== Further pioneer work ===
The following winter was passed in Salem, where Mercer purchased one-half interest in a blacksmith shop and worked from 6 a.m. to 11 p.m. Flour was $40 per barrel and all other provisions in proportion. In the summer of 1853 he removed his little ones to Puget Sound, traveling by boat to the Cowlitz River and then driving to Olympia, the trail being almost impassable. From Olympia he drove to Steilacoom, and there by boat to Seattle, arriving here August 25, 1853. He took up a claim of 160 acres (0.65 km^{2}), adjoining that of D.T. Denny, all of which is now within the city limits.

He brought to the primitive town the same team of horses which had transported him safely across the plains, and his was the first wagon brought to the town. His claim being situated back from the water, the young men turned out and assisted in cutting a trail wide enough for his wagon to pass through to his ranch, and for a number of years he did the teaming for the town. In 1854 he built a box house, securing lumber from Yesler's mill. This house was somewhat open to the light of day, but it afforded protection and was soon improved.

Part of his claim, being bottom land, was soon cleared, and the second year he raised in hay, oats and vegetables, sufficient to provide for his family and stock. Mercer was a hard worker and was progressive in his ideas, and soon became the leading farmer of the community. For seven years he was mother, father and protector to his family of little ones, all of whom grew to maturity.

In 1859, Mercer was married, in Salem, Oregon, to Loretta H. Ward, of Kentucky, daughter of Jesse Ward, a pioneer of 1853; and returning to Seattle he continued his agricultural life. With the organization of King County in 1854, Mercer was appointed one of the first commissioners, and in 1858 he was elected probate judge and held the position for ten consecutive years. With the increased settlement of the town and demand for residence property, Mercer platted the town of Eden and later that of West Seattle, from the sales of which he has realized a considerable fortune. In 1994 what was left of Thomas's estate was spread among his descendants.

=== Naming the lakes ===
In an address delivered at Seattle's first Fourth of July picnic in 1854, Mercer suggested that the largest of the Seattle lakes be called Lake Washington after George Washington in recognition of the occasion. The lake next to it would be named Lake Union. This was the first vague proposal for the union of Lake Washington with Puget Sound via ship canals, eventually realized decades later in the form of the Lake Washington Ship Canal. In 1883, he built a large Seattle house overlooking a smaller cottage built in 1854.

=== Death ===
Mercer died May 25, 1898. He had four daughters.

== Archives ==
- Thomas Mercer papers. 1862-1887. 26 items. At the University of Washington Libraries Special Collections.
- Bagley, Jenner, and Mercer families papers. 1821-2005. .58 cubic feet (1 box). At the University of Washington Libraries Special Collections.
- Clarence Bagley papers. 1864-1931. approximately 10.33 cubic feet. At the University of Washington Libraries Special Collections.
