= Ballard Bridge =

Drawbridge in Seattle, Washington, United States

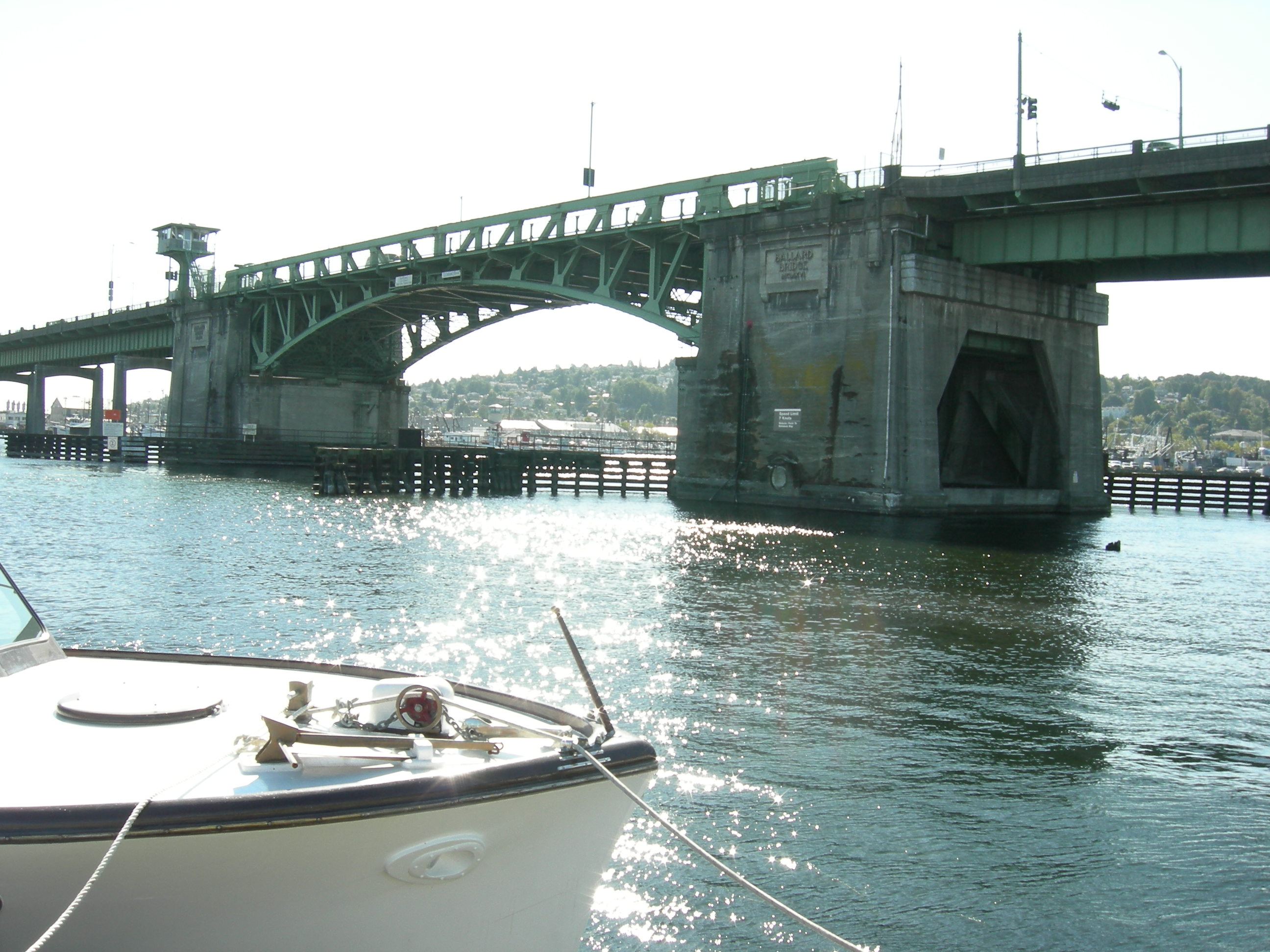
- The Ballard Bridge seen from the Seattle Maritime Academy
- Coordinates: 47°39′34″N 122°22′34″W
- Carries: 15th Avenue NW
- Crosses: Salmon Bay
- Locale: Seattle
- Other name: 15th Avenue Bridge
- Maintained by: Seattle Department of Transportation
- Heritage status: NRHP

Characteristics
- Total length: 2,854 ft (870 m)
- Longest span: 218 ft (66 m)

History
- Architect: A.H. Dimock
- Construction end: 1917
- Rebuilt: 1939
- Ballard Bridge
- U.S. National Register of Historic Places
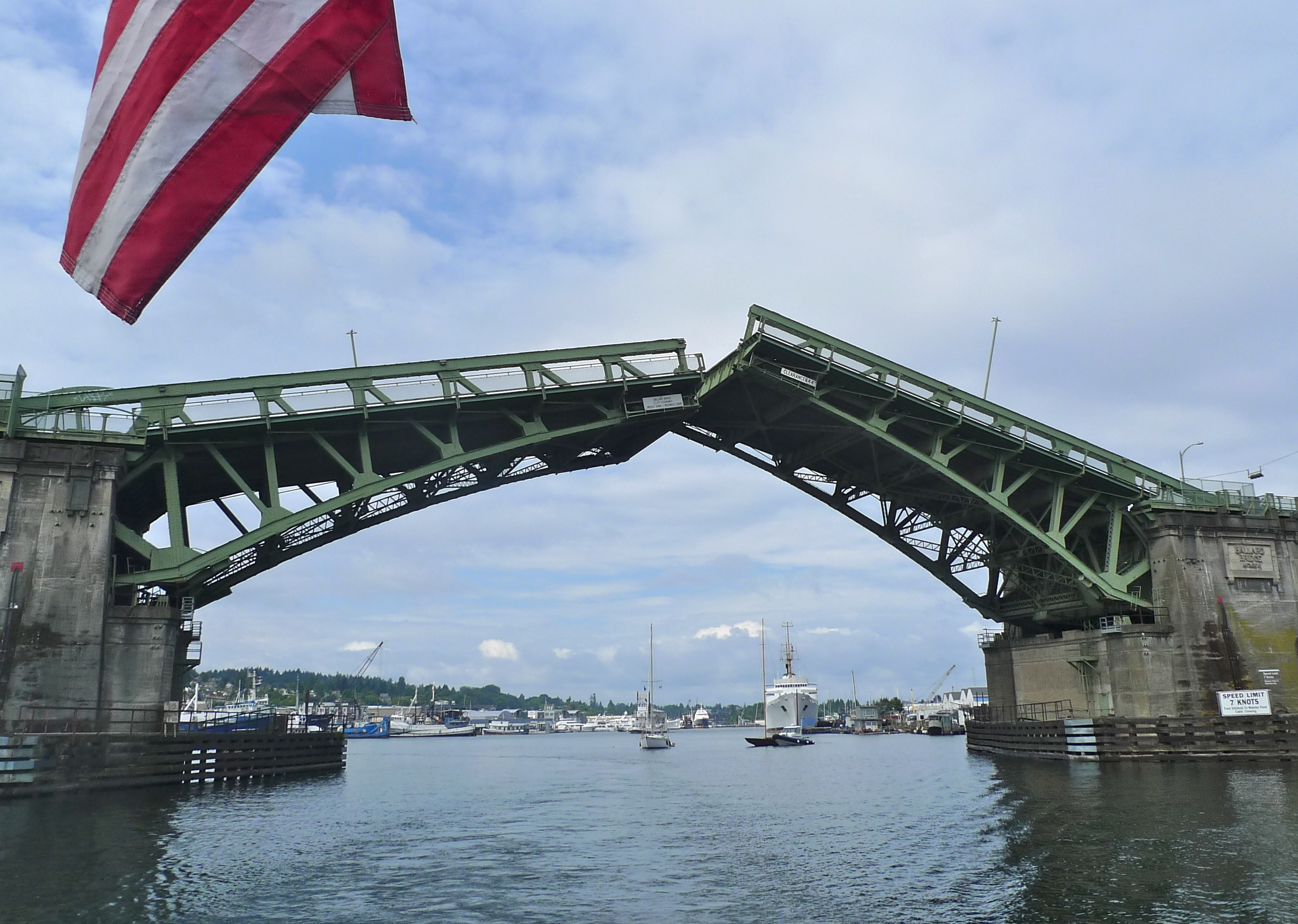
- Ballard Bridge in the process of opening (or closing)
- Location: Seattle, Washington
- Coordinates: 47°39′34″N 122°22′34″W
- Built: 1917
- MPS: Historic Bridges/Tunnels in Washington State TR
- NRHP reference No.: 82004231
- Added to NRHP: July 16, 1982

Location
- Interactive map of Ballard Bridge

The Ballard Bridge, also known as the 15th Avenue Bridge, is a double-leaf bascule bridge in Seattle, Washington. It carries 15th Avenue NW over Seattle's Salmon Bay between Ballard to the north and Interbay to the south. The Ballard Bridge follows the Fremont Bridge in the east in the succession of bridges spanning the Lake Washington Ship Canal, which connects Lake Washington in the east to Puget Sound in the west.

Built in 1917, it has an opening span of 218 ft (66 m) and a total length of 2,854 ft (870 m). The approaches of the bridge were originally timber trestles. It also carried a streetcar. In 1939, the timber approach spans of the Ballard Bridge were replaced as a Public Works Administration project. The deck was surfaced with concrete and the rails for the streetcar were removed. In 1982, it was added to the National Register of Historic Places.

In recent years bicyclists have complained that improvements are needed to address safety concerns.

In 2024, work began on seismic improvements to the bridge structure, including installing ground anchors and other safety features. The project shut down the bridge to vehicular traffic over several weekends in September and October.

== Cultural Impact ==
The Ballard Bridge is featured on the crest of Ballard FC, a semi-professional soccer team competing in USL League Two. Their largest supporters' group is called the Bridge Keepers, also in reference to the Ballard Bridge.

== Gallery ==
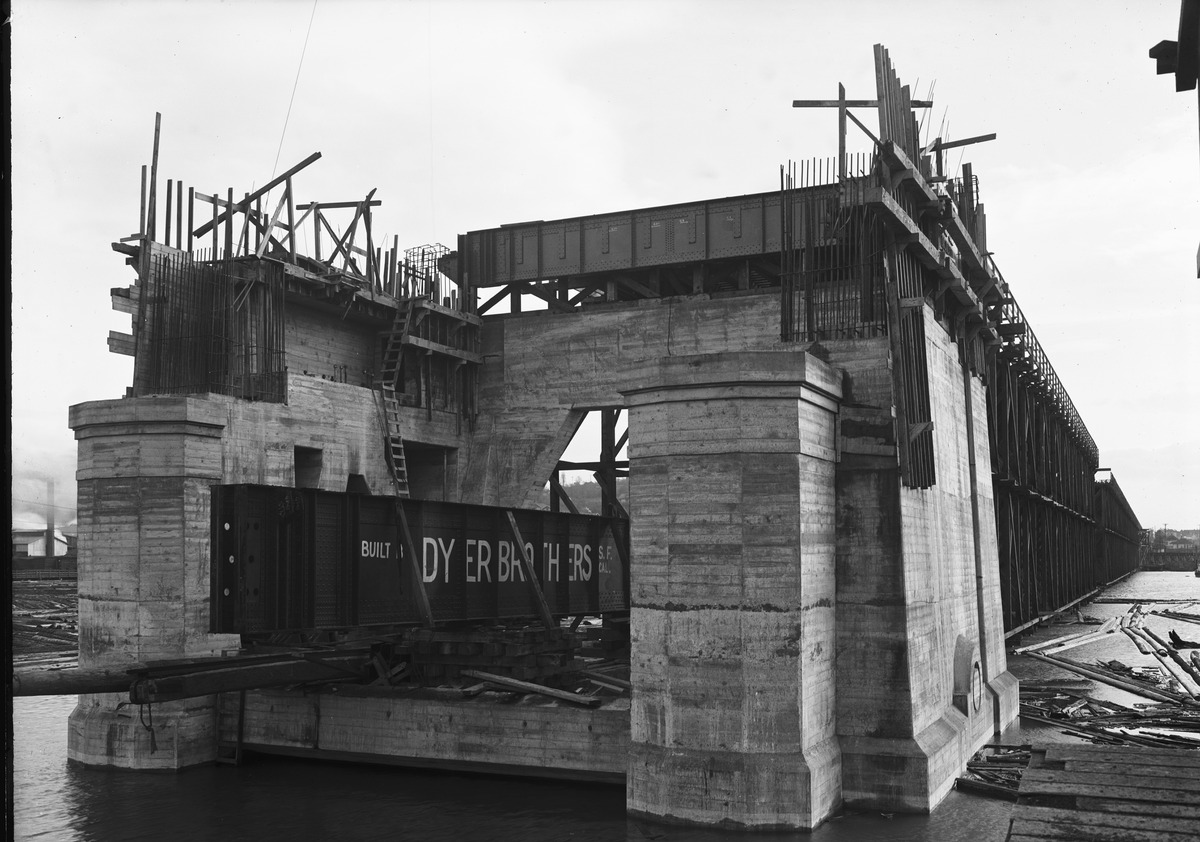
Ballard Bridge under construction, 1916

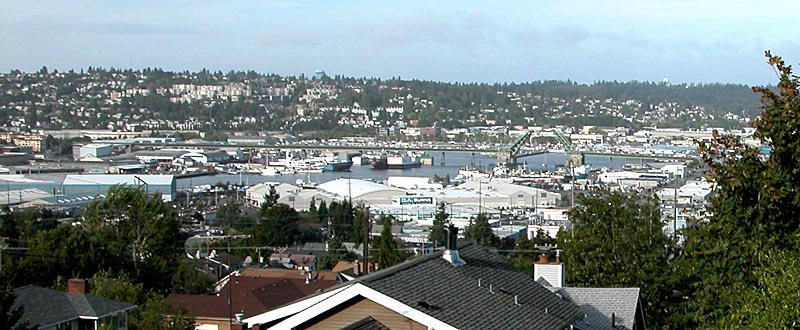
The bridge, up

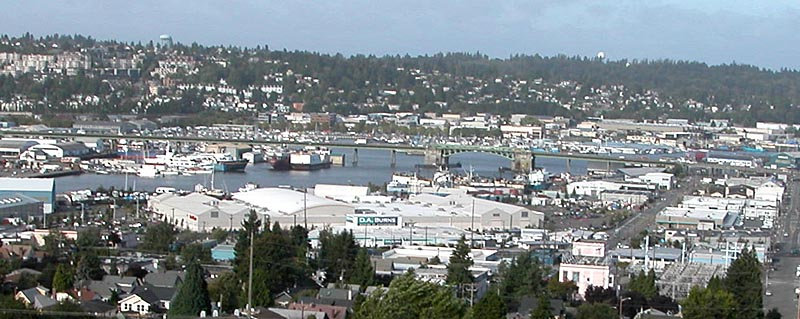
The bridge, down
