= Fremont Cut =

Canal in Seattle, Washington

Coordinates: 47°39′03″N 122°21′25″W

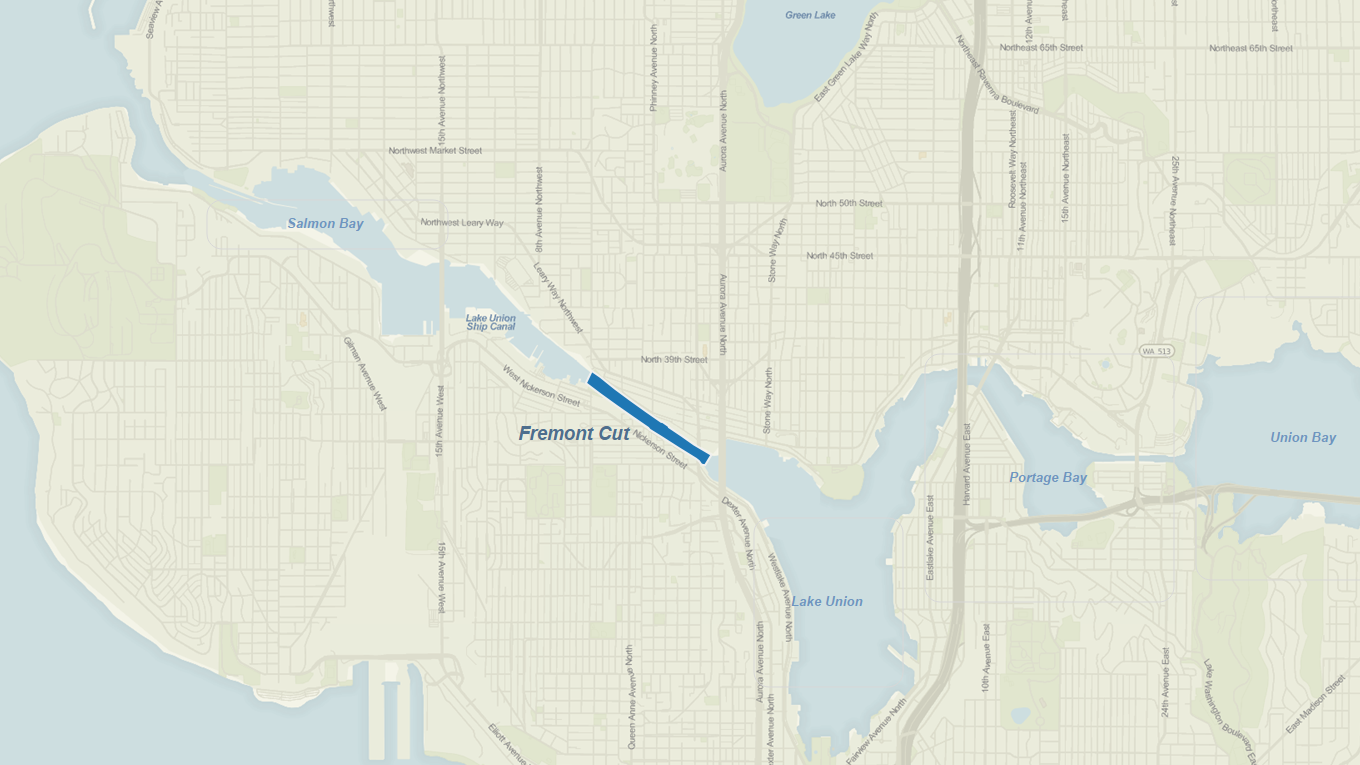
The Ship Canal with Fremont Cut shaded in dark blue

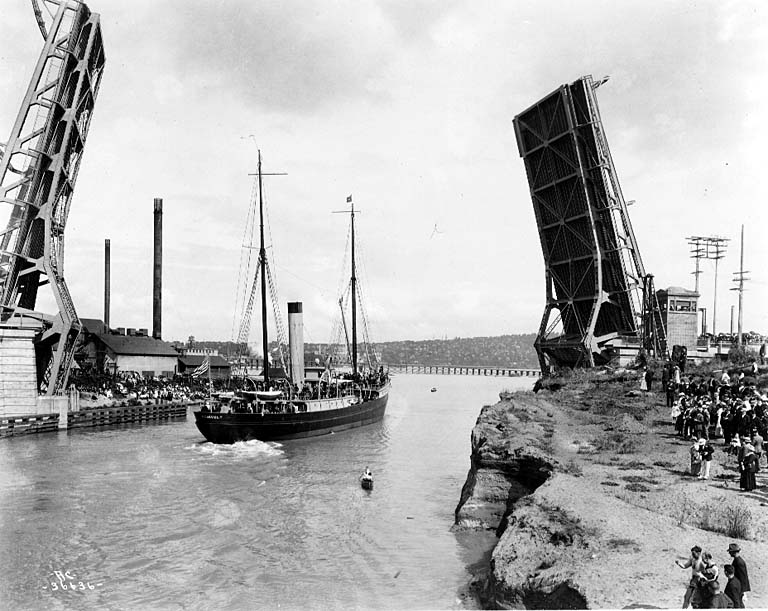
The Fremont Bridge at the 1917 opening of the Ship Canal

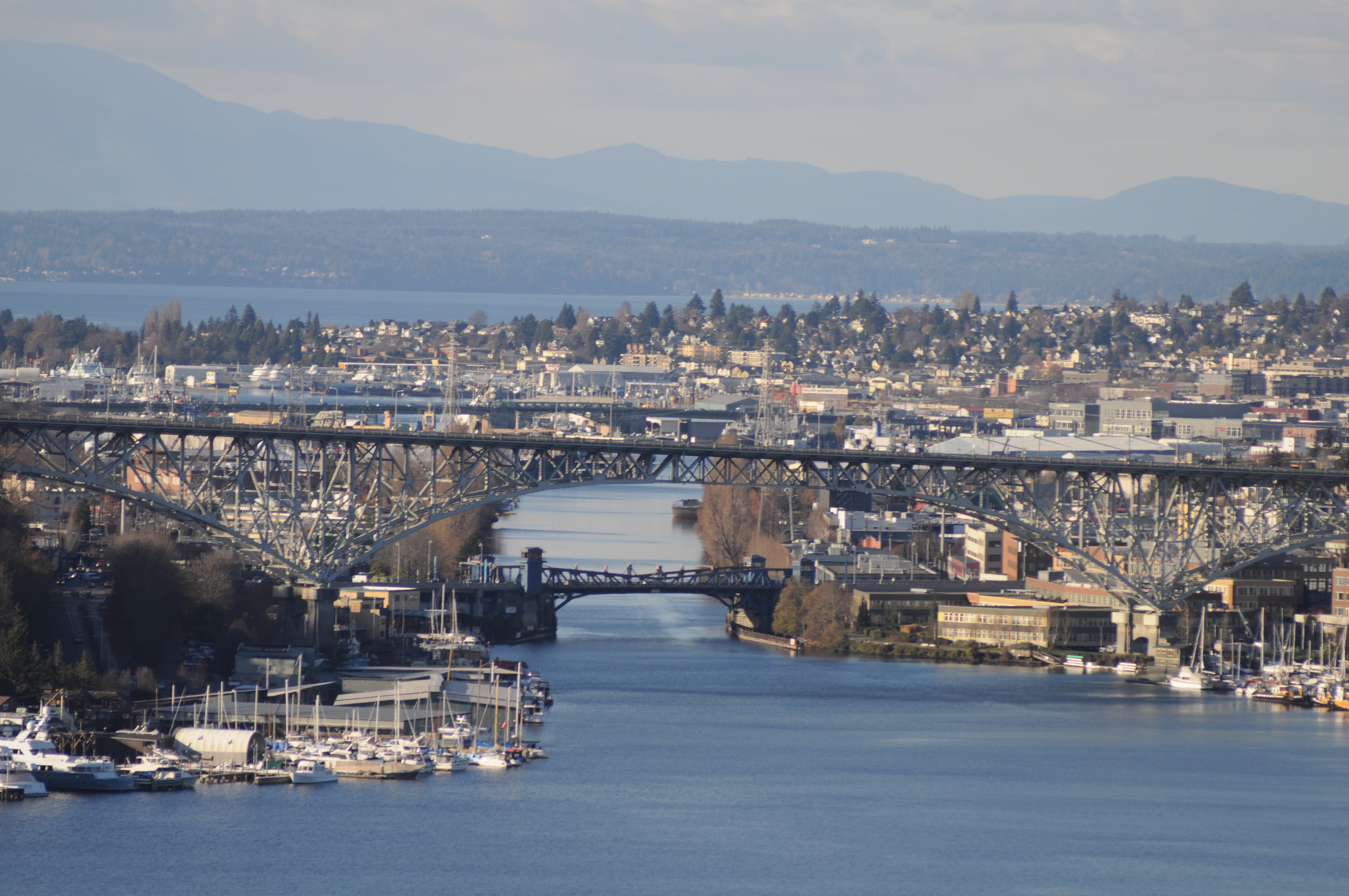
Fremont Cut looking west-northwest towards the Olympic Peninsula

The Fremont Cut is a canal in Seattle, Washington, United States, that connects Lake Union to the east with Salmon Bay to the west. It is part of the Lake Washington Ship Canal linking Lake Washington to Puget Sound, and is 5,800 feet (1,800 m) long and 270 feet (82 m) wide. The center channel is 100 feet (30 m) wide and 30 feet (9.1 m) deep.

== History ==
Work first began on the cut when the Lake Washington Improvement Company contracted in 1883 to dig out Ross Creek which at that time was Lake Union’s fresh water outlet to Salmon Bay. The total amount of material excavated was about 2 million cubic yards. Up until the Chittenden Locks were completed in 1917, the Fremont Cut’s eastern end near the Fremont Bridge was separated from Lake Union by a low wooden dam, a small wooden lock, and a spillway.

== Environs ==
Named for the neighborhood lying just to the north, the cut is spanned by the Fremont Bridge, a bascule drawbridge that connects Fremont with Queen Anne to the south via Fremont Avenue North. South of the cut is the 456’ high Queen Anne Hill while to the east is the Aurora Bridge (officially the George Washington Memorial Bridge), a cantilever truss, suspension structure that carries old US 99 (Pacific Highway) over the west end of Lake Union. Various high tech companies are located just north of the cut in the Fremont area, notably Adobe Systems, Tableau Software and Google.
