= Lake City Beach Park =

Public beach in Seattle, Washington, United States

- Beach
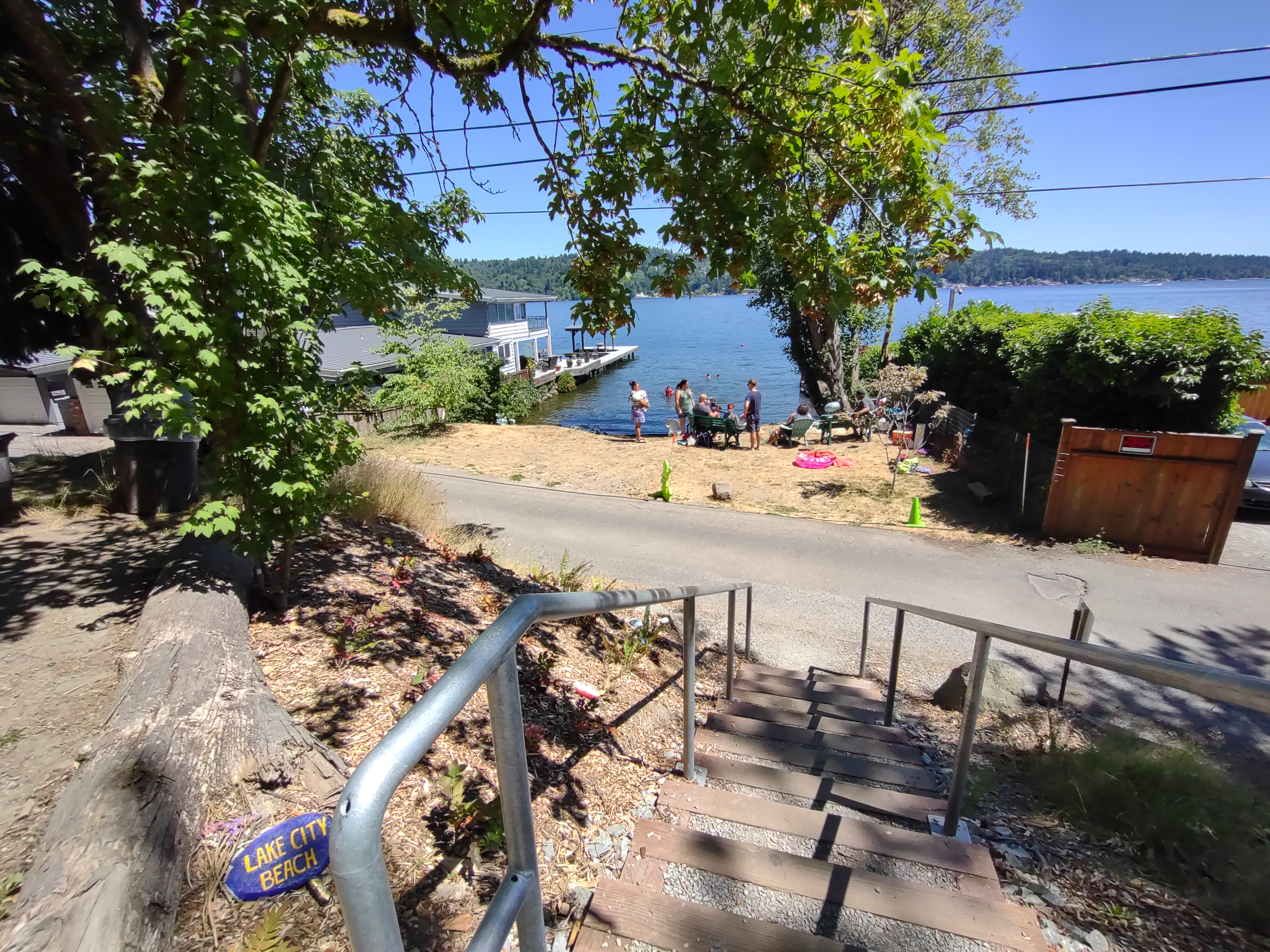

- Coordinates: 47°43′22.8″N 122°16′52.3″W
- Location: Seattle

Area
  - Total: 3,653 square feet (339.4 m^{2}) land; 13,736 square feet (1,276.1 m^{2}) including water

Dimensions
  - Width: 60 feet

Lake City Beach Park, formerly known as Northeast 130th Street Beach, is a 60-foot-wide (18 m) public beach in Seattle on Lake Washington located immediately off the Burke-Gilman Trail at the eastern end of NE 130th Street in Lake City. The beach was a source of controversy when, in 2013, after 82 years of public access, a fence was put by the owners of the two adjoining properties after they discovered a legal technicality that gave them ownership of the segment.

The City of Seattle threatened in 2015 to force purchase of the land under eminent domain. Condemnation proceedings resulted in a settlement, and in 2019, the beach was made an official city park and officially named NE 130th Street End. The case had attracted enough attention over the years that The Seattle Times treated its designation as a park as front-page news. In February 2025, the park received its current name.

== See also ==
- Shoreline street ends in Seattle
