= Fremont Bridge (Seattle) =

Drawbridge in Seattle, Washington, United States

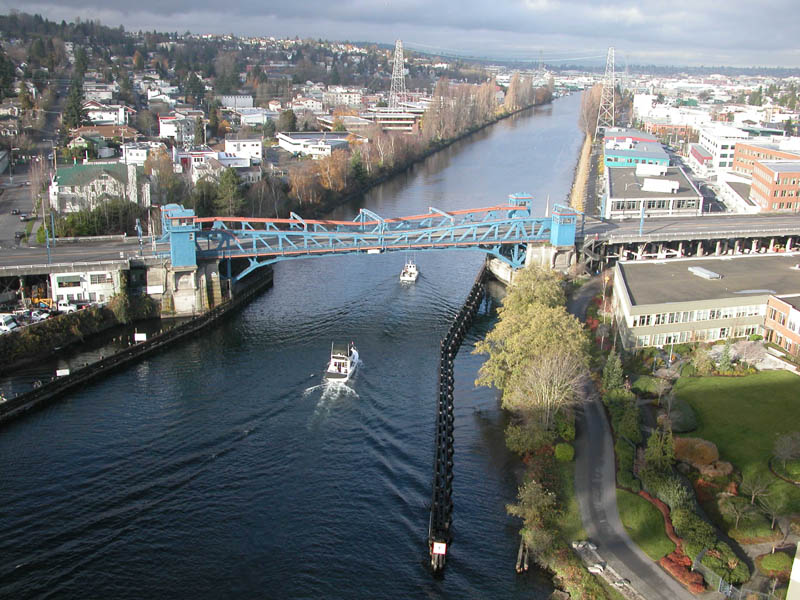
- The Fremont Bridge from the George Washington Memorial Bridge
- Coordinates: 47°38′51″N 122°21′00″W
- Carries: Fremont Avenue N
- Crosses: Fremont Cut
- Locale: Seattle, Washington
- Maintained by: Seattle Department of Transportation

Characteristics
- Design: bascule
- Total length: 502 feet (153 m)
- Longest span: 242 feet (74 m)
- Clearance below: 30 feet (9.1 m)

History
- Opened: June 15, 1917

Seattle Landmark
- Designated: December 28, 1981
- Fremont Bridge
- U.S. National Register of Historic Places
- Location: Spans Lake Washington Ship Canal, Seattle, Washington
- Area: less than one acre
- Built: 1917
- Engineer: Arthur H. Dimock
- MPS: Historic Bridges/Tunnels in Washington State TR
- NRHP reference No.: 82004234
- Added to NRHP: July 16, 1982

Location
- Interactive map of Fremont Bridge

The Fremont Bridge is a double-leaf bascule bridge that spans the Fremont Cut in Seattle, Washington. The bridge, which connects Fremont Avenue North and 4th Avenue North, connects the neighborhoods of Fremont and Queen Anne. The Fremont Bridge is the first of four city bascules to cross the canal, the others being Ballard Bridge (1917), University Bridge (1919), and Montlake Bridge (1925). The bridge was added to the National Register of Historic Places in 1982, and is also a designated city landmark, ID #110347.

== History ==
=== Earlier Bridges ===
The present bridge is actually the third bridge at this location. Before the construction of the Lake Washington Ship Canal, a narrow stream or slough called "the Outlet" connected the northwest corner of Lake Union to Salmon Bay and Puget Sound. It's this feature that caught the eye of early Euro-American settlers who began claiming and clearing the land to make way for industrial development in the 1880s. In 1883, Henry Yesler and the Lake Washington Improvement Company bought a strip of land for a canal right-of-way, and Judge Thomas Burke and Daniel H. Gilman purchased land for the construction of a railroad line (the Seattle Lake Shore & Eastern Railway). In 1885 the Lake lake Washington Improvement Co widened the outlet into a ditch big enough to accommodate small boats and floating logs to existing sawmills on the lake.

It was not until electric streetcar lines were introduced that the first Fremont Bridge was constructed in 1890 or 1891, a low trestle bridge that carried electric streetcars and other traffic across the small canal / expanded outlet. 1891 was the year that Fremont was annexed into the City of Seattle. The original bridge was rickety, made of wood, and at a low grade. After a washout in 1903, the City raised the bridge to the level of Ewing Street (now 34th St).

This first bridge was razed in 1911, in anticipation of the construction of the Lake Washington Ship Canal, replaced by temporary bridges at Fremont Avenue and Stone Avenue (now Stone Way). The Stone Avenue Bridge connected Westlake Avenue to Stone Way, crossing the northwest corner of Lake Union, five blocks east of the old bridge. It was wide enough for car and streetcar traffic, and included a steel truss opening for boats.

The temporary Fremont bridge was a higher trestle bridge, and also carried streetcar traffic. On March 12, 1914 when the Fremont Dam between Lake Union and the canal broke, the flooding ruptured the central portion of the bridge. Streetcar traffic was rerouted over the Stone Avenue Bridge. Although the span was repaired and reopened within three weeks, the streetcar traffic remained rerouted until the completion of the present-day bridge.

=== Planning ===
City Engineer Arthur Dimock spent two years studying various bridge types and when presenting some of the options to Seattle City Council in 1914, concluded that bascules were the best choice for the new ship canal crossings, due to the composition of the canal bottom and minimal space required to build. The Ballard, Fremont, and University bridges were modeled after bridges by Chicago’s Public Works Department that were wide enough to accommodate car, horse, streetcar, and pedestrian traffic.

The estimated cost was $342,000 and the project would require over 100 tons of steel. The bridge engineer was F.A. Rapp and the city’s architect, Daniel R. Huntington designed the piers. In 1915 contracts were awarded and construction began.

=== Current Bridge ===
The Fremont Bridge was opened on Friday June 15, 1917, at a cost of $410,000. The first traffic over the bridge was to "owl cars", the last run of the trolleys, and then after 5am the same day to all other traffic. The Lake Washington Ship Canal was dedicated on July 4, 1917, which has caused confusion about the opening date, for this bridge crosses the canal.

Opening and closing at 10x speed.

The amount of vehicle traffic increased steadily since the opening of the bridge. In its early years, the Fremont Bridge had the most vehicle traffic of any bascule bridge in the United States. By 1927 an estimated 26,000 cars crossed the Fremont Bridge daily, with regular back-ups several blocks long due to openings for ship traffic. As such, planning began soon for a high-level bridge crossing at Aurora Avenue, as part of U.S. Highway 99 construction and completed in 1932.

Fremont Bridge, Seattle, circa 1981. Courtesy of the Seattle Municipal Archives, #213402, Series 1629-01.

Fremont Bridge, Seattle, circa 1954. Courtesy of the Seattle Municipal Archives, #213434, Series 1629-01.

The Fremont Bridge was originally painted a dull green. In 1972, the Fremont Improvement Committee picked a new color, Fremont Orange, and residents approved the change. The bridge's blue and orange color was chosen by voters at a 1985 street fair. In 1994 two neon sculptures by Rodman Miller were added to the bridge's towers. The one on the northwest tower is of Rapunzel, with her hair extending out of the window; the other on the northeast tower depicts Rudyard Kipling's fable "How the Elephant Got Its Trunk."

In 1928 the bridge received backup motors. In 1960 an addition of an exterior deck raised the height of the control tower to improve visibility. In 2006, the Fremont Bridge underwent a $41.9 million restoration project to replace the approaches and maintenance shop, as well as renovation of the mechanical and electrical systems that operate the bascule. The approaches were completed in May 2007 and testing lasted through the Spring of 2008. In 2014 the city began repainting the bridge.

== Usage ==
=== Traffic ===
Due to its low vessel clearance of 30 feet (9.1 m), the Fremont Bridge opens an average of 35 times a day, which makes it the most frequently opened drawbridge in the United States and one of the busiest bascule bridges in the world. Federal law gives marine traffic the right-of-way over vehicular traffic; however, the Fremont Bridge is closed to most water traffic during rush hours.

A bicycle counter was installed in 2012. It was the first of twelve counters in the city, as of 2018. Bike traffic reached 1.12 million rides in 2019, a 13% increase from the year before.

=== Artists in Residence ===
The Seattle Office of Arts & Culture and Seattle Department of Transportation run an artist-in-residence program for the northwest tower of the bridge. Although the residency frequency, duration, and artistic medium varies, what remains consistent is the goal for artists to create new works inspired by their time spent in the bridge.

Kristen Ramirez was the inaugural Artist in Residence in 2009, and her work resulted in a temporary sound installation that incorporated oral histories from the community.

The next artist residency did not occur until 2016, when Elissa Washuta served as writer-in-residence, with an assignment to write an "in-depth exploration of the historic bridge's role and meaning for the city of Seattle."

The 2017 residency call was for a lighting artist, to coincide with the centennial of the ship canal and intended to cover all three bascule bridges. Artists Ian Campbell and Hayley Buckbee were selected. In the end only the Fremont Bridge received a lighting display, installed in 2018.

The 2018 residency for a musician/composer went to Paul Warlsh.

In 2020 the residency for comic artists expanded to include a second artist stationed at the University Bridge. E.T. Russian was selected as the University Bridge artist and Roger Fernandes (Lower Elwha S’Klallam) was selected as the Fremont Bridge artist-in-residence.

The 2023 residency for digital artists with a focus on data visualization went to Vivian Li (Fremont Bridge) and Mariah Vicary (University Bridge).

The 2025 residency for animation artists went to Freyja Whitney (Fremont Bridge) and Vivian Cho (University Bridge).
