= Lake Washington Ship Canal =

Waterway in Seattle, Washington, United States

Coordinates: 47.64319°N 122.33482°W

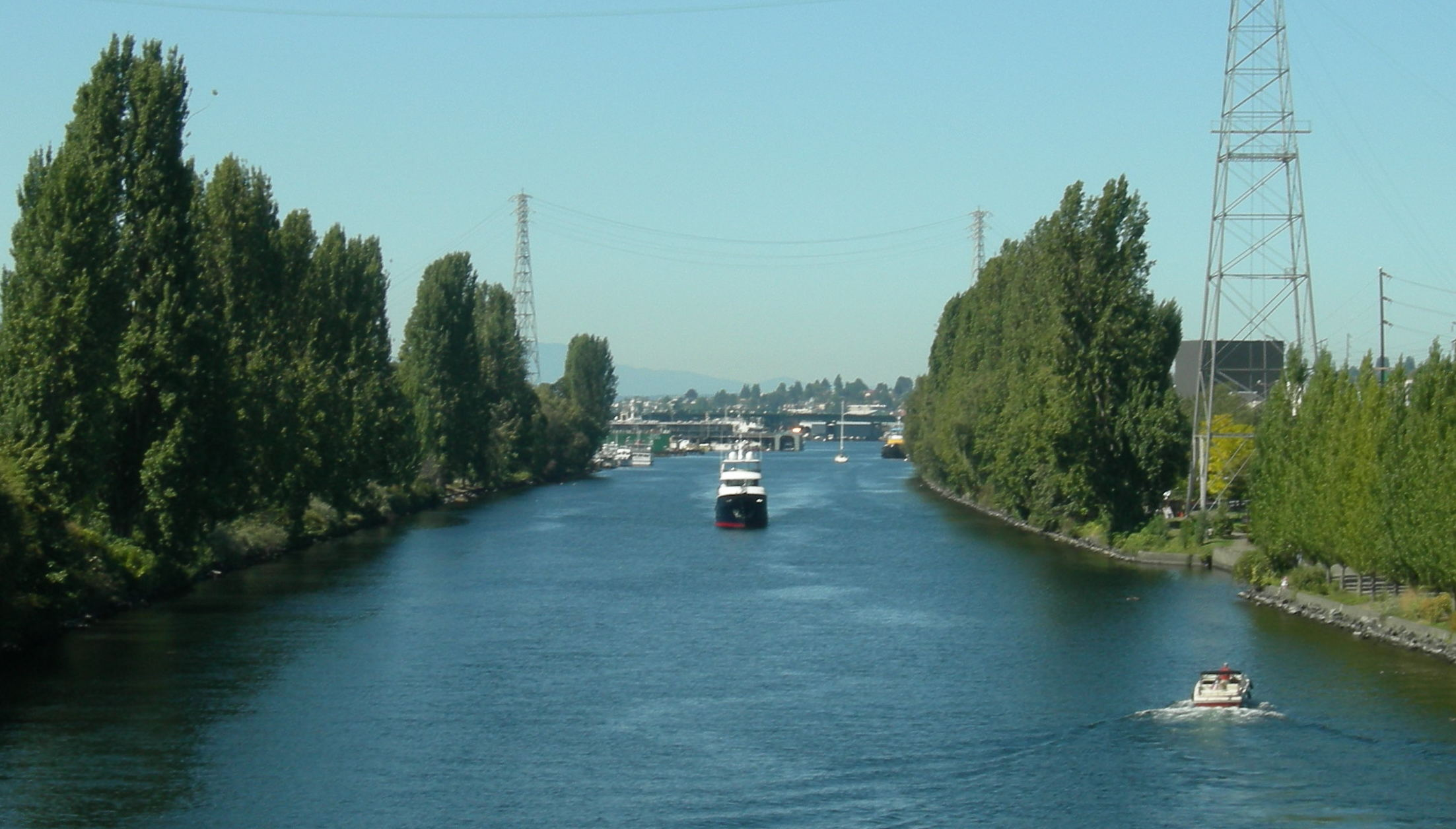
- The Fremont Cut as seen from the Fremont Bridge

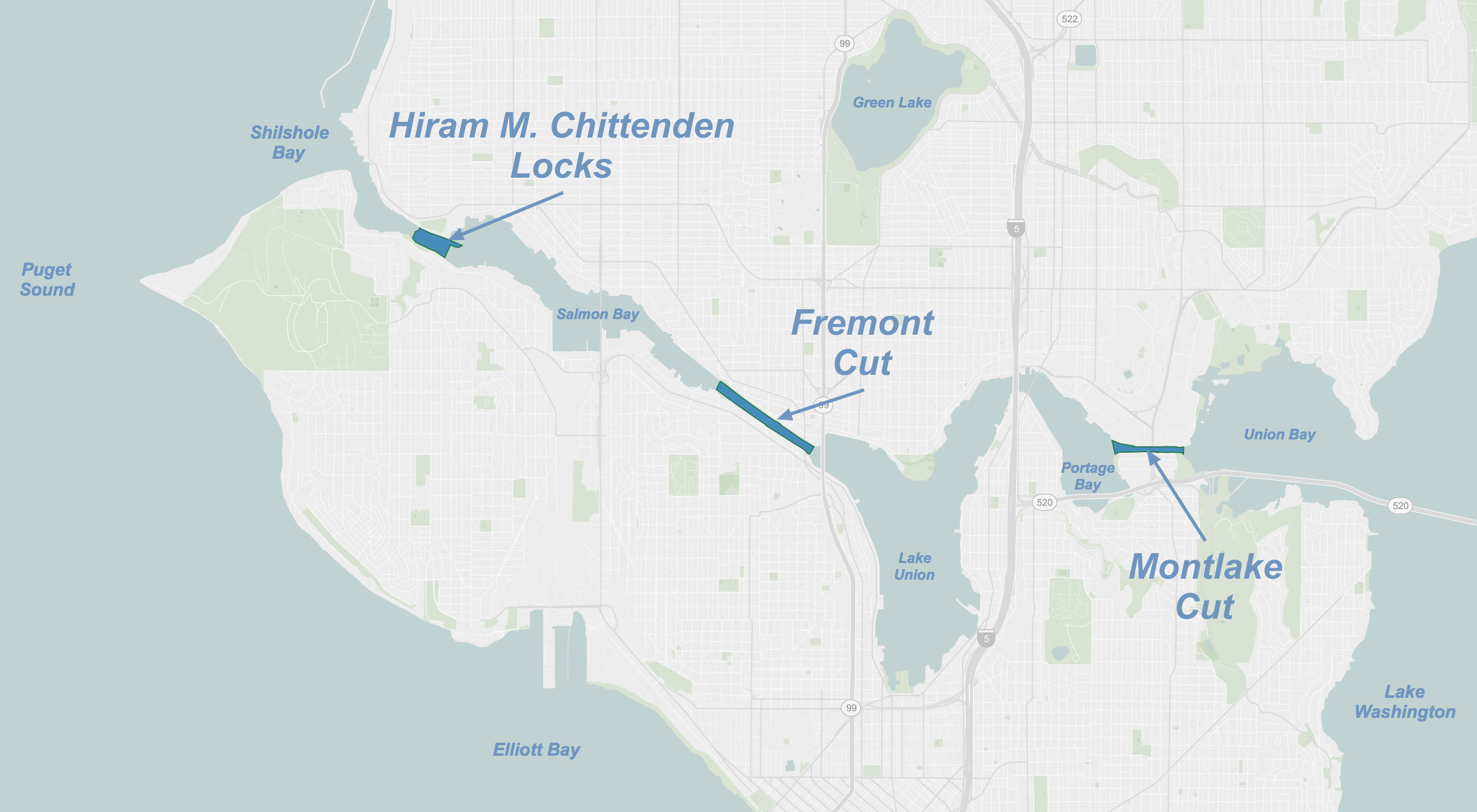
- The route of the canal
- Interactive map of Lake Washington Ship Canal
- Location: Seattle, Washington
- Country: United States

Specifications
- Length: 8 miles (13 km)
- Maximum boat draft: 29 feet (8.8 m)
- Total rise: 20 feet (6.1 m)

History
- Current owner: U.S. Army Corps of Engineers
- Construction began: 1911
- Date completed: 1934

Geography
- Start point: Shilshole Bay, Puget Sound
- End point: Union Bay, Lake Washington

- Chittenden Locks and Lake Washington Ship Canal
- U.S. National Register of Historic Places
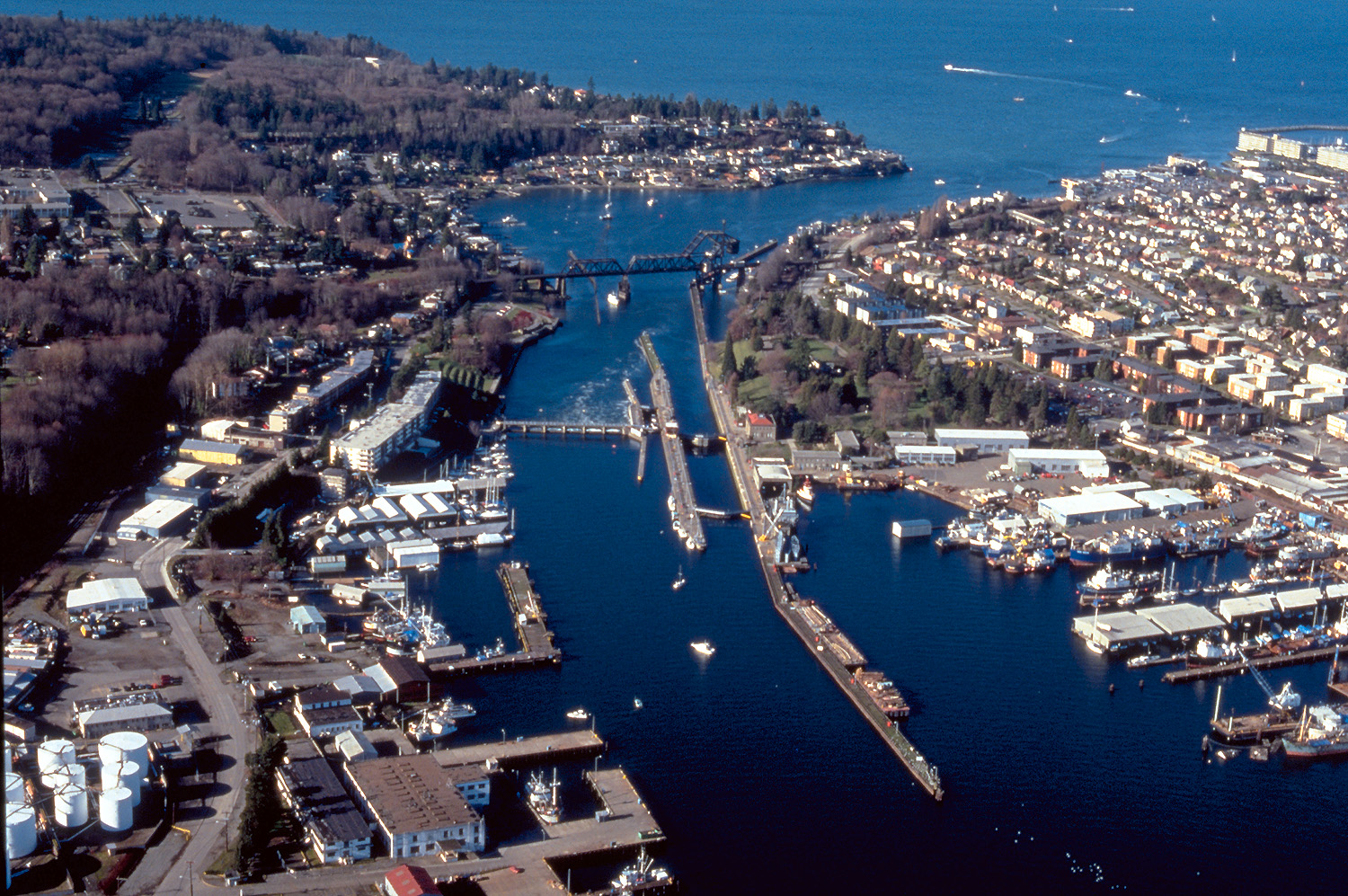
- Aerial view of the Hiram M. Chittenden Locks
- Location: Salmon Bay, Seattle
- Built: 1911–1934
- Architect: Bebb and Gould
- Architectural style: Late 19th And 20th Century Revivals
- NRHP reference No.: 78002751
- Added to NRHP: December 14, 1978

The Lake Washington Ship Canal is a canal that runs through the city of Seattle and links the fresh water body of Lake Washington with the salt water inland sea of Puget Sound. The Hiram M. Chittenden Locks accommodate the approximately twenty-foot (6.1 m) difference in water level between Lake Washington and the sound. The canal runs east–west and connects Union Bay, the Montlake Cut, Portage Bay, Lake Union, the Fremont Cut, Salmon Bay, and Shilshole Bay, which is part of the sound.

== History ==
Timeline
- 1854: Thomas Mercer proposes connecting lakes Union and Washington with Puget Sound
- 1860: Landowner Harvey L. Pike tries to dig a ditch by himself, to transport logs between Portage Bay and Union Bay
- 1871: Pike, Thomas Burke and Daniel Gilman incorporate the Lake Washington Canal Company, which builds tramway, not canal October Army recommends Naval base on Lake Washington with northern canal to Elliott Bay
- 1883: David Denny and Burke hire Chinese laborers to dig Portage Canal, a 16-foot (4.9 m) channel with a lock for floating logs
- 1880s: Canal is dug from Lake Union to Salmon Bay, with a wooden lock near Fremont
- 1893: Eugene Semple attempts to build a canal across the southern end of Beacon Hill and fill the south Elliott Bay tidelands; what is Harbor Island today
- 1900: State Legislature endorses northern route, through Lake Union
- 1901: Due to delays, planned freshwater Navy base on Lake Washington scrapped in favor of Navy Yard in Bremerton
- 1902: Corps of Engineers rejects Semple's Canal route. Rivers and Harbors Act appropriates funds and assigns 3 officers to study possible canal in Seattle
- 1904: After financing dries up and Semple resigns, work on Beacon Hill canal stops, though filled tidelands are useful
- 1906: Developer James A. Moore gets Congressional approval for private canal project from Salmon Bay to Shilshole Bay; April Hiram M. Chittenden is new Corps of Engineers Seattle District Commander; supports Moore's canal route but criticizes his plans as too modest and underfunded
- 1908: Chittenden retires but continues to lobby Congress for Ballard Locks
- 1910: Congress appropriates $2,275,000 for locks; King County is responsible for rest of canal
- 1911: November 10 construction of Locks begins
- 1912: July Locks close, turning Salmon Bay freshwater
- 1916: Temporary dam at Montlake is breached
- 1917: May 8 Government (or Ballard) Locks officially open for boat traffic
- 1934: Lake Washington Ship Canal complete
- 1956: Government Locks renamed in memory of Chittenden (d. 1917)

The ship canal project began in 1911 and was officially completed in 1934. Prior to construction of the Lake Washington Ship Canal, otherwise known as the Salmon Bay Waterway, water used to exit Lake Washington via the Black River which flowed from the south end of Lake Washington into the Duwamish River.

As early as 1854, there was discussion of building a navigable connection between Lake Washington and Puget Sound for the purpose of transporting logs, milled lumber, and fishing vessels. Thirteen years later, the United States Navy endorsed a canal project, which included a plan for building a naval shipyard on Lake Washington. In 1891 the US Army Corps of Engineers started planning the project. Some preliminary work was begun in 1906, and work began in earnest five years later. The delays in canal planning and construction resulted in the U.S. Navy building the Puget Sound Naval Shipyard in Bremerton, Washington, which is located across the Sound from Seattle.

=== Early efforts ===
For centuries, people had been dragging boats between the lakes, giving names like "carry a canoe" sxWátSadweehL to the crossing points. In 1854 Seattle pioneer Thomas Mercer proposed canals connecting Lake Union and Lake Washington to Puget Sound in a speech at the first Independence Day celebration of the Seattle area's first permanent white settlement, shortly after its founding. Mercer gave the lakes the names they are presently called, over the original Lushootseed names used by the Duwamish, tenas Chuck or XáXu7cHoo ("small great-amount-of-water") for Lake Union and hyas Chuck or Xacuabš ("great-amount-of-water") for Lake Washington. Lake Union was chosen to suggest the future canals merging the waters, and Lake Washington for George Washington.

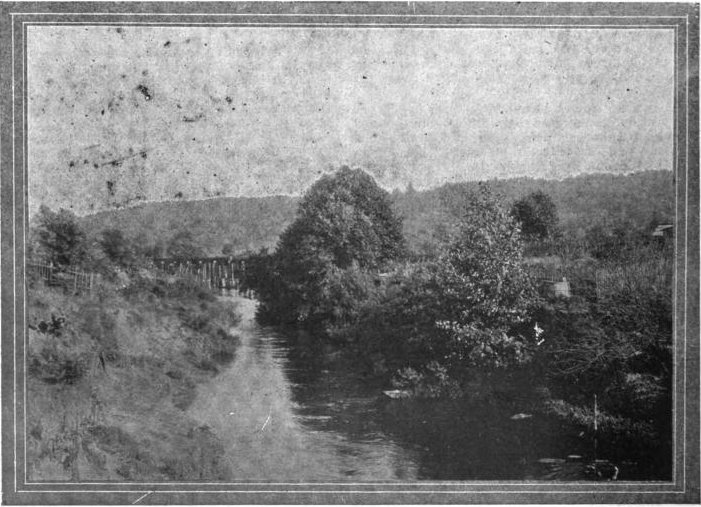
Montlake Portage Canal in 1908

In 1860, local landowner Harvey L. Pike tried to dig a ditch by himself with pick and shovel at Montlake to transport logs between Portage Bay and Union Bay, in the hopes of increasing the value of his property along the route. Giving up on digging the first Portage Canal himself, in 1871 he joined Thomas Burke and Daniel Gilman in incorporating the Lake Washington Canal Company, deeding his land to the company. Instead of finishing the canal, the company instead built a tramway to carry coal brought by barge across Lake Washington. In 1883, David Denny and Burke hired a crew of Chinese laborers to complete the canal at Montlake, creating a 16-foot (4.9 m) channel that included a lock, capable of floating logs down from Lake Washington to Lake Union.

The Army Corps of Engineers investigated Puget Sound for military defense purposes and chose Lake Washington as the best location for a Naval base, due to the security of the waters, proximity to supplies of fresh water, coal and timber, and the less corrosive effect on wooden ship hulls of a fresh water port. A report by Lieutenant Thomas H. Hardy of October 13, 1871, forwarded to Congress by Army General Barton S. Alexander of the Board of Engineers of the Pacific Coast said the coal fields of Seattle Coal and Transportation Company, two miles east of Lake Sammamish, supplied 1,500 tons per month of steam ship grade coal, and potentially twice this amount. The route directly across the narrowest part of Seattle, that is, Semple's Canal from Leschi straight across to present-day Harbor Island, was rejected in this report because of the 200 to 300 foot height of the hills that would have to be cut through. The route via the Black and Duwamish Rivers would be crooked and several miles in length, would let out into shoals rather than deep water, and would have to be frequently dredged to remove sand brought by river flooding. As to connecting Lake Union to Shilshole Bay—the route ultimately chosen—Gen. Alexander had "serious objections", including the expense and the need for dredging a channel, and that the canal line let out in shoal water that was exposed to heavy seas, and would be less defensible in wartime, being "exposed to the cannonade of an enemy". Alexander was less opposed to digging straight south from Salmon Bay through Interbay to Smith Cove, but would still terminate in shoals and be just as costly as his preferred route from Lake Union through Mercer's Farm into Elliott Bay, while being less defensible. The estimated cost for the project was $4.7 million.

In the Rivers and Harbors Act of 1902, Congress directed the Secretary of War to appoint a committee of three officers to study the feasibility of a canal and lock system to connect Puget Sound to Lake Washington. Lieutenant Colonel William H. Heuer, Captain William C. Langfitt and Lieutenant Robert P. Johnson met August, 1902 in Seattle and conducted a survey of possible routes. They examined the route of the Lake Washington Waterway Company, via Shilshole Bay, as well as a route from Lake Union to Smith Cove, the Montlake coal tramway, and Thomas Mercer's farm. In November 1902, a public meeting was called in the Chamber of Commerce hall, but was quickly adjourned because no one came to speak.

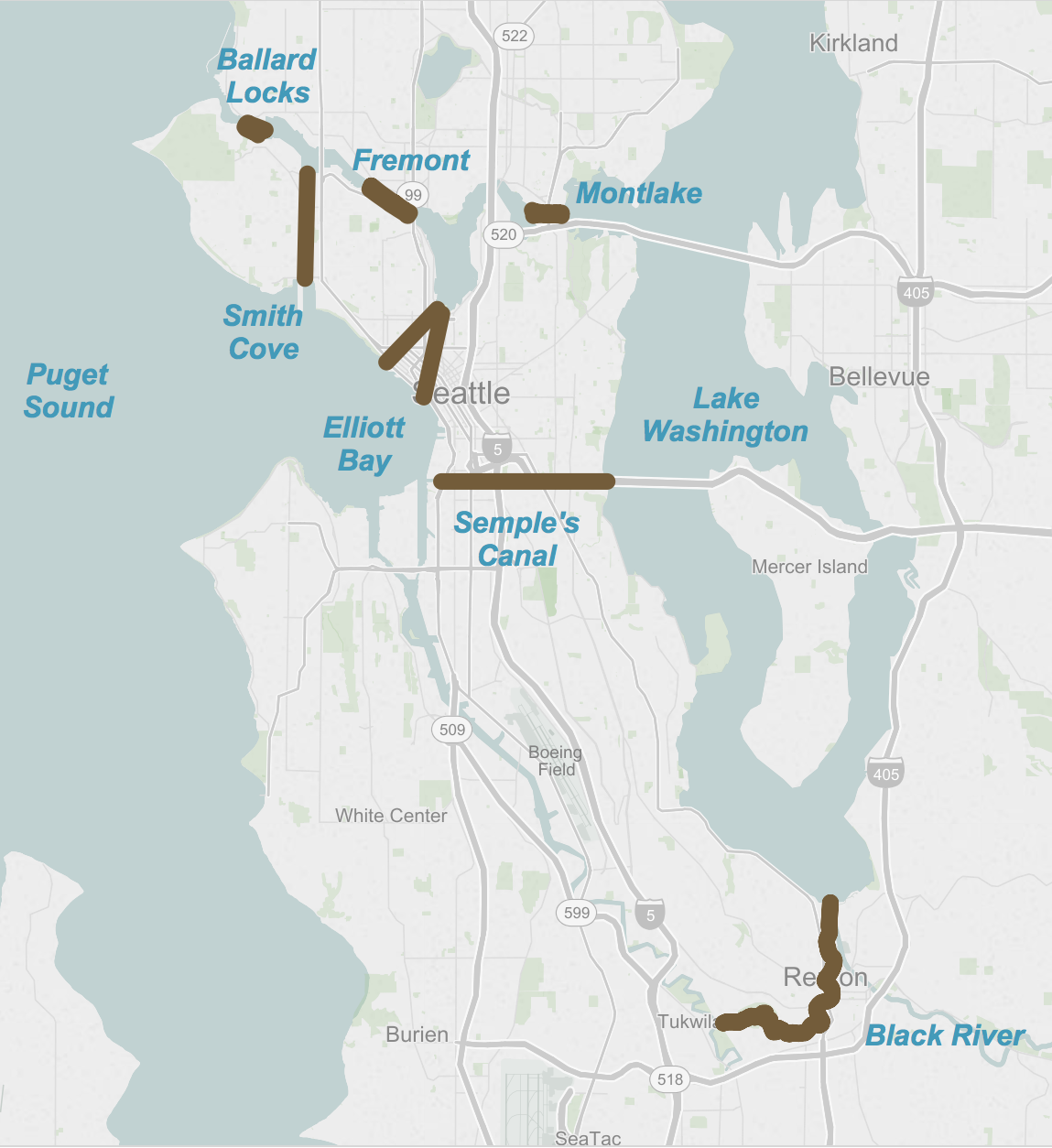
Proposed canal routes included the Black River, Semple's Canal across Beacon Hill, two possible routes from Lake Union to Elliott Bay via Lower Queen Anne and Belltown, the Montlake Cut, and Salmon Bay to Smith Cove via Interbay.

In 1906, as local debate over the location of the canals continued, and funding from Washington, D.C. was delayed, Seattle developer James A. Moore, known today for the Moore Theatre and Moore Haven, Florida, proposed a canal that could accommodate small ships, with two wooden locks connecting Salmon Bay to Shilshole Bay. Moore secured Congressional approval for his project, granting him rights to build. In April of the same year, Hiram M. Chittenden came to Seattle as the new Army District Engineer. Chittenden favored the same route to Shilshole Bay as Moore, but found the plan too modest, and potentially unsafe. Chittenden said Moore's hope-for budget of $500,000 was insufficient, and the locks should be built to accommodate larger vessels, and that the wooden locks would eventually deteriorate and collapse, draining Lake Washington into Puget Sound.

Instead, Chittenden proposed a double concrete lock with steel gates, allowing small craft to pass with less waste. A single set of locks on the western end of Salmon Bay would be used in place of the small wooden lock near Fremont Avenue, which would lower Lake Washington to the same level as Lake Union. Having a single lock between Puget Sound and the freshwater lakes would reduce the risk of flooding and reduce overall cost of the project. Before he could move forward, Chittenden had to sway local leaders away from supporting Moore's project. After enthusiasm for his canal eroded and funding dried up, Moore transferred his rights to a public-private entity, the Lake Washington Canal Association, in 1907. Though Chittenden hoped to cap his career with the construction of the Locks, ill health forced him to retire in 1909, though he continued lobbying Congress for the project, and served as a consulting engineer and as a Seattle port commissioner until his death in October 1917.

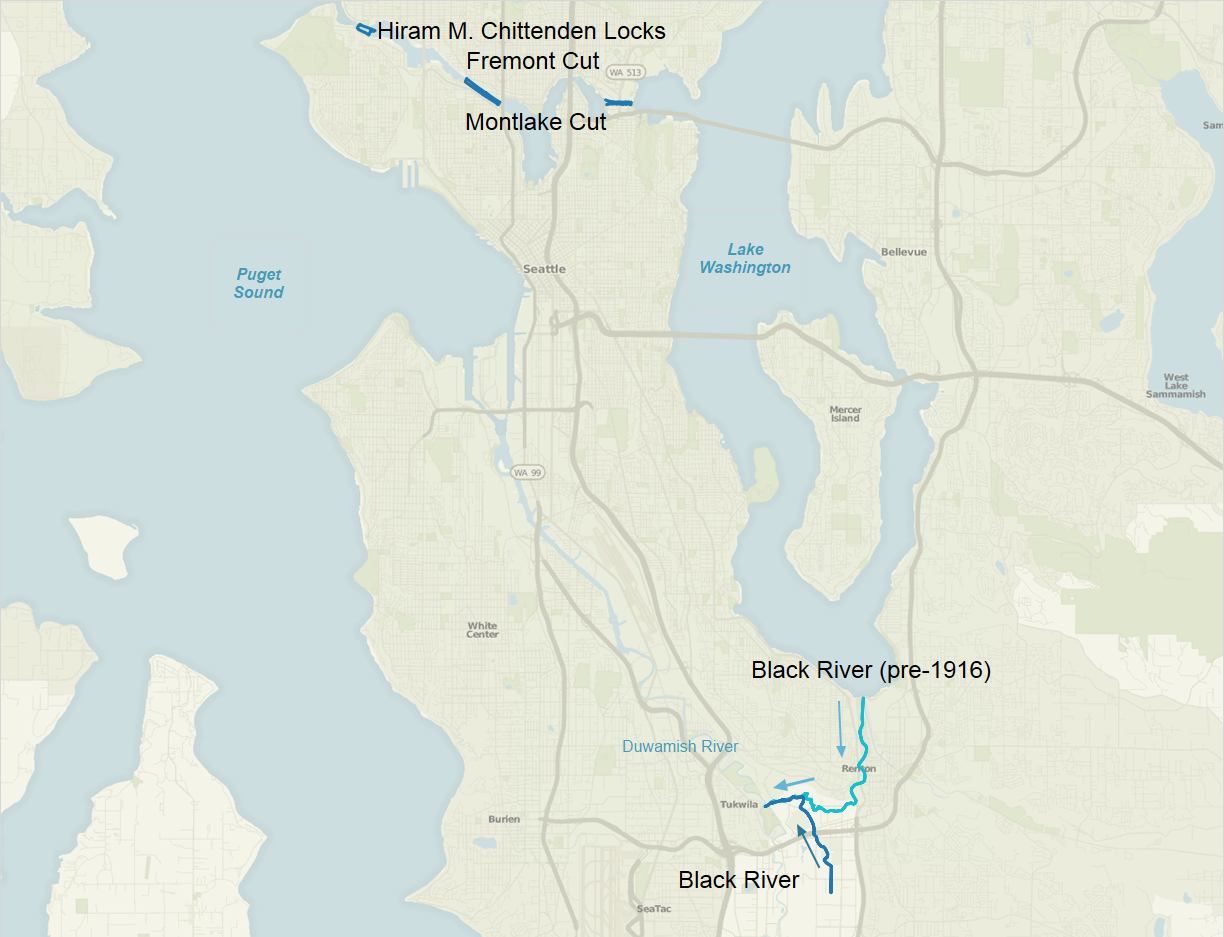
Lake Washington Ship Canal and the Black River, showing course of river in 2013 and before 1916

== Navigation ==
=== Traffic ===
Navigation starts at Webster Point in Lake Washington and continues to Shilshole Bay. Speed limit is 7 knots with more restrictions including 2.5 knots for entering and exiting the locks. Canal traffic signals present 1,000 feet (304.8 m) each side of the Montlake Bridge and east of the Fremont bridge and west of the Ballard Bridge. Vessels 300 tons (272.15 metric tons) and vessels with a tow may not pass a red signal. Other Vessels should use caution for on coming large commercial traffic.

=== Drawbridges ===
All bridges can be contacted on channel 13 for an opening or use horn. Horn blasts of one long, at least four seconds, and one short, of about a second, can be used to request an opening. A reciprocal response from a bridge is acknowledgement that the information has been received and the bridge will open in time. Bridges may hold for up to ten minutes before opening, and longer at certain times of the day five short blast from a bridge means that the bridge will not be opening.

Non-self-propelled vessels must be towed by a suitable self-propelled vessel past the bridge.

== Sewage and stormwater mitigation ==
During heavy or prolonged rain, stormwater runoff and overflowing wastewater from neighborhoods along the Ship Canal is dumped into the waterway. The practice was found to be polluting Salmon Bay and Puget Sound with an average of 130 spills per year dumping 90 million US gallons (340 Ml) of untreated wastewater. The U.S. Environmental Protection Agency and Washington State Department of Ecology ordered the Seattle city government to address the issue, signing a consent decree in 2016 to plan a diversion system. The system will use a 2.7-mile (4.3 km) tunnel running along the north side of the canal with access stations at five sites in Fremont, northern Queen Anne, and Ballard before reaching a pump station, where wastewater can continue to the West Point sewage treatment plant. The pump station in Ballard is planned to be a 65-foot-tall (20 m) cylinder covered in a steel lattice structure that reaches 80 feet (24 m) in height; it is expected to cost $100 million. The tower's design evokes the local maritime industry and is inspired by crab pots; the lattice will include light-emitting diodes that are programmed to display colors that represent local weather or the pumping station's status.

The project is expected to cost $570 million to construct, with 65 percent of funding sourced from Seattle Public Utilities and the remaining 35 percent from the King County government. The project had originally been estimated to cost $423 million, but limited supply in the area's busy construction market caused cost overruns. Construction on the nineteen-foot-wide (5.8 m) tunnel began in June 2021 with the launch of a tunnel boring machine, named "Mudhoney" in honor of the local grunge band following a public contest. Tunnel boring from Ballard to Wallingford was completed in June 2023 and construction is scheduled to be completed in 2026.

== Canal crossings ==
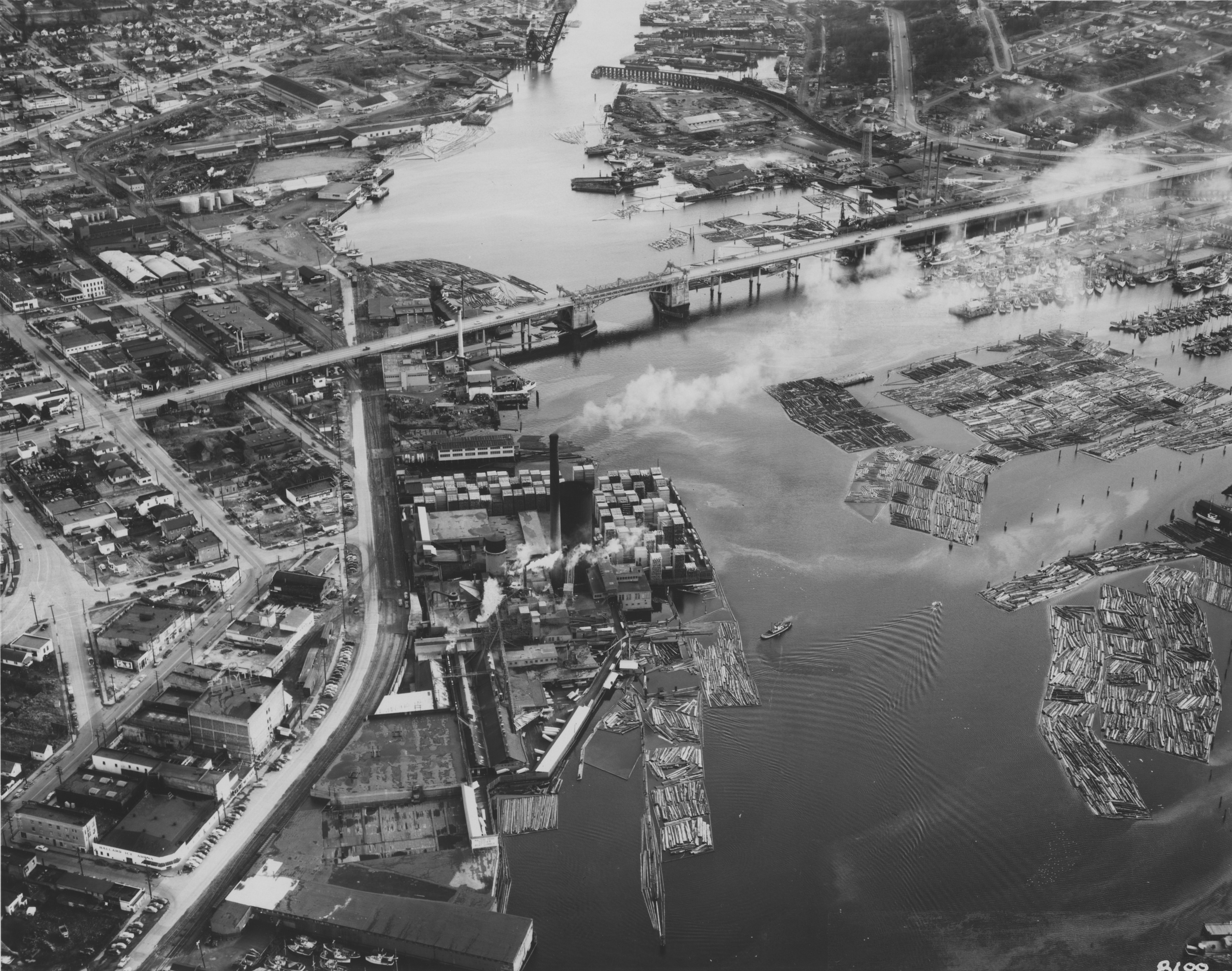
Looking the opposite direction, the Ballard Bridge and, at top of frame, Northern Pacific Railroad Ship Canal Bridge (bascule bridge, open here), 1950.

The Canal's crossings, from east to west, are:

- the University Link Tunnel carrying Link light rail under the canal
- the Montlake Bridge carrying State Route 513 (Montlake Boulevard NE) over the Montlake Cut
- the University Bridge carrying Eastlake Avenue over Portage Bay
- the Ship Canal Bridge carrying Interstate 5 over Portage Bay
- the George Washington Memorial Bridge (commonly called the Aurora Bridge) carrying Aurora Avenue N. (State Route 99) over the west end of Lake Union
- the Fremont Bridge connecting 4th Avenue N. to Fremont Avenue N. over the Fremont Cut
- Northern Pacific Railroad Ship Canal Bridge near the west end of the Fremont Cut 1914–1976, no longer extant.
- the Ballard Bridge carrying 15th Avenue over Salmon Bay
- pedestrian crossing only at the Hiram M. Chittenden Locks
- the BNSF Railway's Salmon Bay Bridge over Salmon Bay

An additional crossing for transit, bicycles, and pedestrians between the Ballard and Fremont bridges was proposed by Mayor Mike McGinn in 2012, but funding to study its feasibility were rejected by the Seattle City Council. A new Link light rail crossing, carrying the Ballard Link Extension near the existing Ballard Bridge, is planned to be constructed in the 2030s.

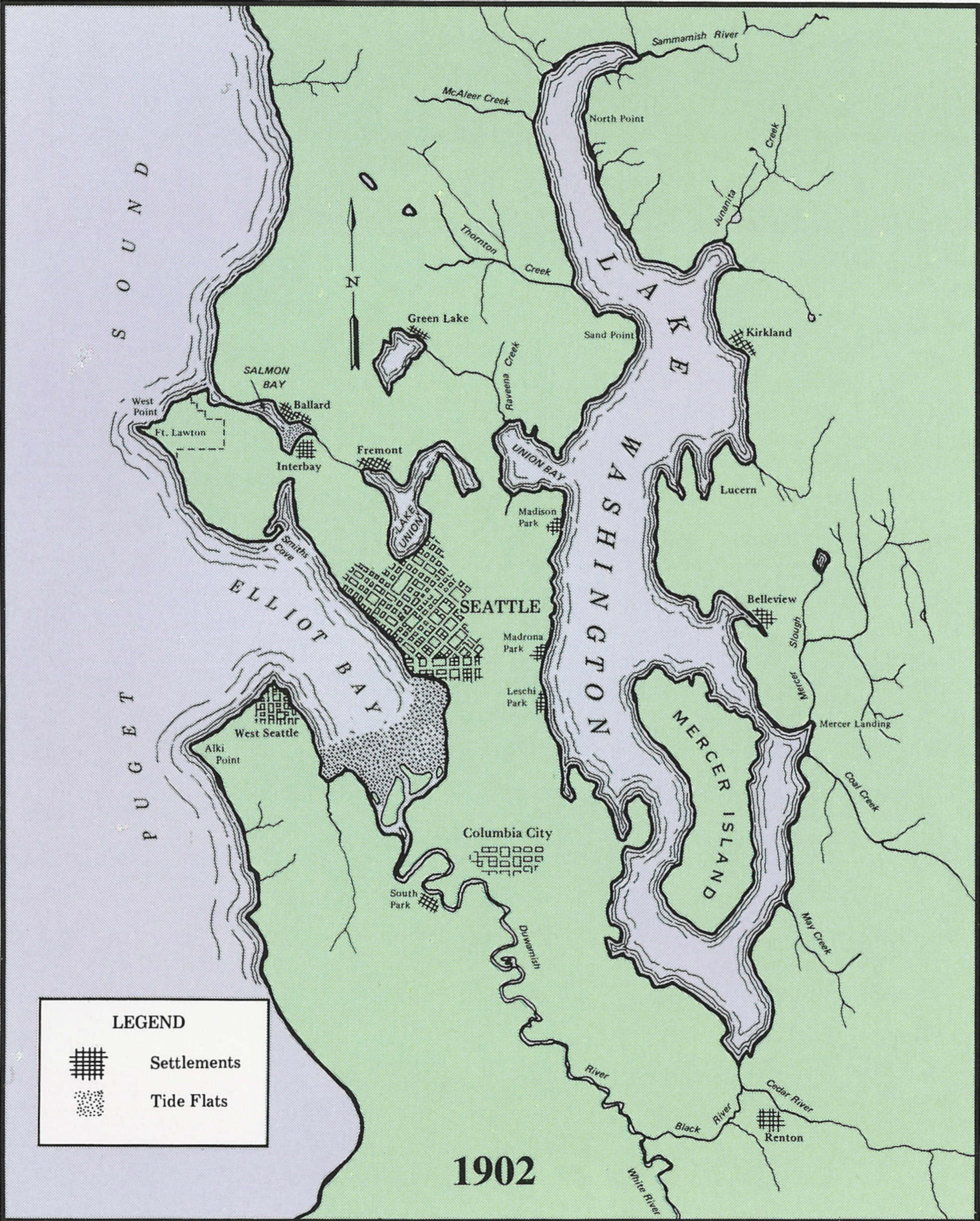
Seattle's waterways before the canal was built. (Note: It is likely that this map is incorrectly labeled as "1902".)

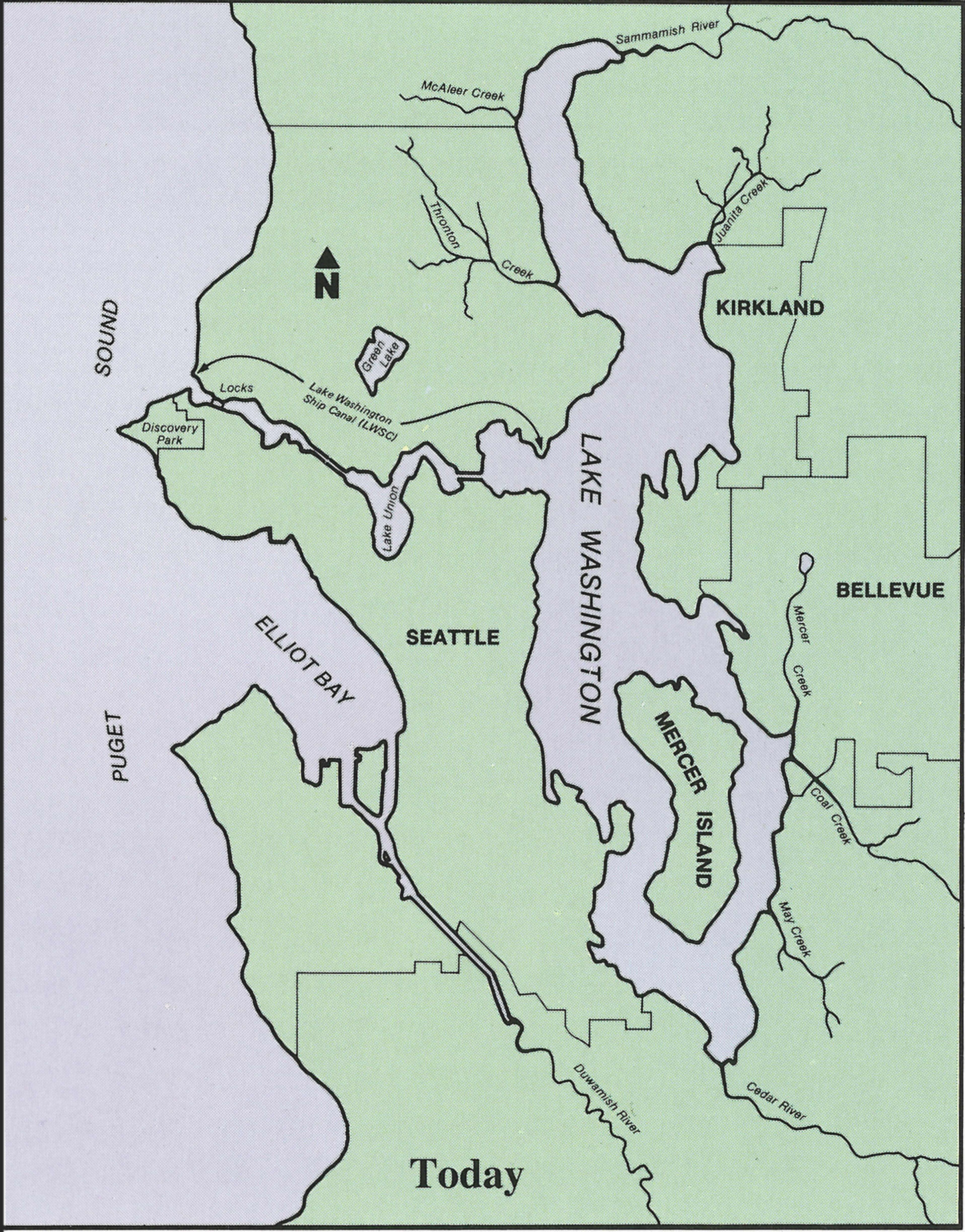
Seattle's waterways in the 1990s, showing the effect of the canal (and of other projects, such as the undergrounding of many streams and the re-routing, dredging, and industrialization of the Duwamish River). (The map remains essentially accurate as of 2009.)

== Seattle landmarks ==
The Lake Washington Ship Canal and the Hiram M. Chittenden Locks are listed on the National Register of Historic Places. The Montlake Cut, along with the Montlake Bridge are City of Seattle Designated Landmarks (ID #107995).
