= Ingraham High School =

Coordinates: 47°43′33″N 122°20′16″W

Edward S. Ingraham High School

Location
- 1819 North 135th Street; Seattle, Washington 98133; United States

Information
- School type: Public, co-educational
- Established: 1959
- School district: Seattle Public Schools
- Superintendent: Brent Jones
- Principal: Zach Elvig
- Teaching staff: 68.40 (FTE)
- Grades: 9–12
- Enrollment: 1,413 (2023-2024)
- Average class size: 25
- Student to teacher ratio: 20.66
- Classrooms: 56
- Campus: Urban
- Campus size: 29 acres (117,359 m²)
- Colors: Blue, White & Gray
- Slogan: It’s a matter of pride!
- Athletics: 22 Varsity teams
- Athletics conference: Sea-King: Metro 3A
- Nickname: Rams
- Newspaper: The Cascade
- Yearbook: The Glacier
- Communities served: Bitter Lake, Haller Lake, Licton Springs, Crown Hill, Greenwood, Broadview, North Beach, Blue Ridge, Northgate
- Feeder schools: Broadview Thomson K-8, Hamilton International Middle School (NC Highly Capable Cohort and Language Immersion), Jane Addams Middle School (NE Highly Capable Cohort), Whitman Middle School (Neighborhood), McClure Middle School, Robert Eagle Staff Middle School (Neighborhood and NW Highly Capable Cohort), Seattle Country Day School
- Website: ingrahamhs.seattleschools.org
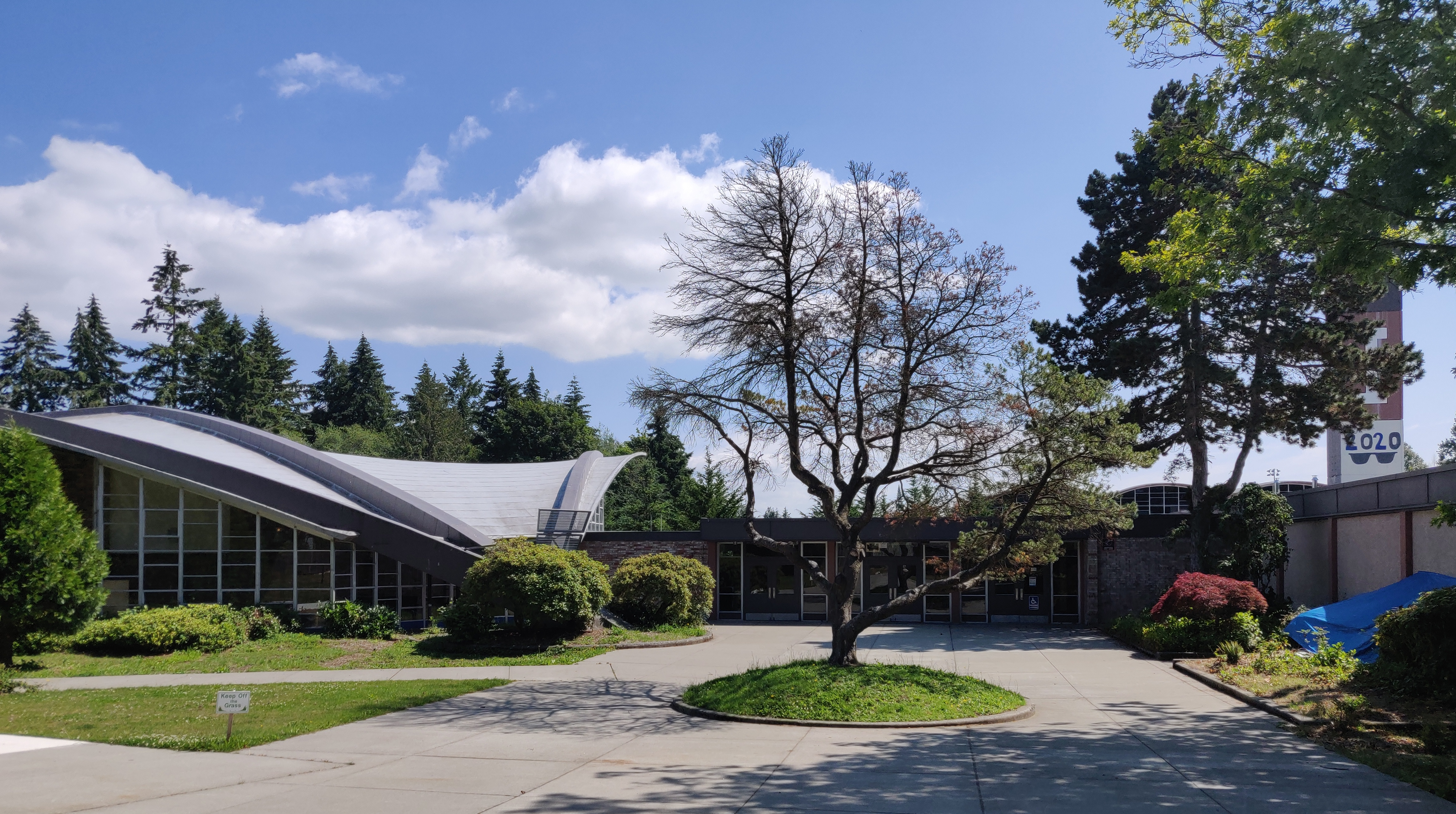
- Main entrance to Ingraham High School

Ingraham High School is a public high school, serving grades 9–12 in the Haller Lake neighborhood of Seattle, Washington, United States. Opened in 1959, the school is named after Edward Sturgis Ingraham, the first superintendent of the Seattle Public Schools. Since 2002, Ingraham has been an International Baccalaureate school, and also offers programs such as the Academy of Information Technology. Since the 2011 school year, Ingraham has also offered an accelerated model of the International Baccalaureate program (IBx), modeled on a similar program in Bellevue School District, allowing students in Seattle Public Schools' highly capable cohort (formerly Accelerated Progress Program).

== History ==
On May 10, 2011, Seattle Schools Superintendent Susan Enfield fired the principal, Martin Floe. A week later, on May 18, after a series of protests, Enfield reversed her decision and Floe was reinstated.

On November 8, 2022, a shooting took place at the school, killing one student. A suspect in the shooting was taken into police custody shortly after the shooting occurred, and was charged with first-degree firearms violations and premeditated murder a week later.

On November 14, 2022, Ingraham and other Seattle Public Schools students had a walk out, asking for increased training for security on de-escalation and anti-racism, as well as updated safe storage laws and an increase in the number of mental health counselors.

== The New Ingraham ==
=== The IB Program ===
The IB program at Ingraham provides the students of Ingraham High School with the opportunity to take advanced classes that can be used for college credits. While the IB Program at Ingraham High School has been criticized due to a lack of diversity, Ingraham High School continues to offer IB as an option.

=== An International School ===
Under the direction of the International Education department, for the 2013–2014 school year, Ingraham's official title changed to Ingraham International School to signify the first year of the Language Immersion pathway being implemented at the school and to strengthen the connection with one of its main feeder schools, Hamilton International Middle School.

== Athletics ==
Ingraham competes in WIAA Class 3A and is a member of the Metro League in District Two.

=== State championships ===
- Boys basketball: 1969
- Football: 1989
- Boys golf: 1972
- Boys track and field: 1965
- Volleyball: 1973, 1974

== Clubs and organizations ==
=== Rocketry Club ===
Formed during the 2006–07 school year, the club designs and builds model rockets. The team gained attention when it qualified to compete in the 2008 Team America Rocketry Challenge national competition, making the front page of the Seattle section of the Seattle Post-Intelligencer. The team finished 29th in the competition. Rocketry club's success in the TARC challenge in 2009 and 2010 earned it the right to participate in NASA's Student Launch Projects. The school fielded one team (Project Rainier) in 2009–10, and two teams (Projects Adams and Olympus) in 2010–11. In 2015, the rocket club, having shrunk to two teams, sent both teams (Delta and Foxtrot) to TARC nationals, where Foxtrot placed 3rd and Delta 21st.

=== Mock Trial ===
Formed by Presidents Riley Magill, Rocco Jala, and Zach Murphy in the 2022-2023 school year, Mock Trial focuses on the civic education and development of public speaking and legal advocacy skills in high school students. The organization has competed in YMCA Mock Trial district competitions from 2024 to the present day. The team placed 2nd at districts and 11th state during the 2026 competition. Notable members include Kai Murphy, Zayn Dowidar, and Ares Gilson who brought the team to states in the 2026 case, Cell To Cell.

== Notable alumni ==
- Jay Inslee, former Washington Governor from 2013 to 2025 and Democratic candidate for president in the 2020 United States Presidential Election before dropping out
- David Horsey, two-time Pulitzer Prize winner in editorial cartooning
- Chuck Jackson, former MLB player (Houston Astros, Texas Rangers)
- Ken Phelps, baseball player
- Tim Paterson, programmer, original author of MS-DOS
- Bob Reynolds, former MLB player (Montreal Expos, Milwaukee Brewers, St. Louis Cardinals, Baltimore Orioles, Cleveland Indians, Detroit Tigers)
- Greg Lewis, All American football player at the University of Washington, drafted by and played for the Denver Broncos of the NFL
- John Urquhart, King County Sheriff
- Avery Cochrane, singer-songwriter
