= Whittier Heights, Seattle =

Seattle Neighborhood in Washington, United States

Coordinates: 47°40′59″N 122°22′13″W

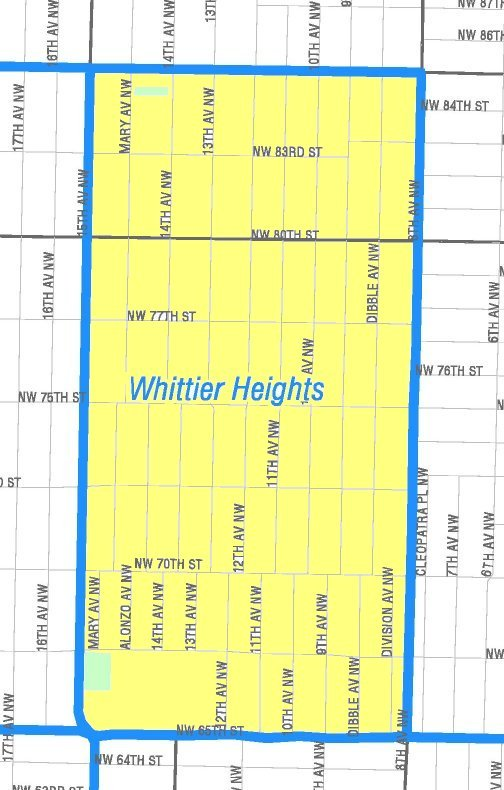
Map of Whittier Heights

Whittier Heights is a neighborhood in Seattle, Washington. It is considered part of greater Ballard.

The neighborhood is bounded to the west by 15th Avenue NW, beyond which is Loyal Heights; to the north by NW 85th Street, beyond which is Crown Hill; to the east by 8th Avenue NW, beyond which is Greenwood and Phinney Ridge; and to the south by NW 65th Street, beyond which is central Ballard.

The neighborhood was originally part of the City of Ballard which was established in 1889. In 1907, the City of Seattle annexed Ballard, and Whittier Heights became part of Seattle.

The neighborhood's name originated from the name of the new elementary school, the Whittier School, which was named to honor John Greenleaf Whittier, a nineteenth century poet, author and abolitionist. The Whittier School is known today as Whittier Elementary School.
