= Avery Cochrane =

American singer (born 2001)

- Born: Avery Cochrane; May 19, 2001 (age 25); Seattle, Washington, U.S.
- Occupations: Singer; songwriter
- Years active: 2021–present
- Musical career
- Genres: Dance-pop; synth-pop; art pop; alternative pop
- Instruments: Vocals; guitar
- Label: S-Curve Records
- Website: averycochrane.com

Avery Cochrane (born May 19, 2001), is an American singer and songwriter.

== Early life ==
Cochrane was born in Seattle and grew up in the Broadview neighborhood. She attended Ingraham High School and was part of the jazz choir.

In 2019, she enrolled at San Diego State University. Her studies were interrupted by the COVID-19 pandemic, during which she began recording music. She later returned to the university and graduated with a degree in political science in 2024.

== Career ==
Cochrane began recording and releasing music independently during the COVID-19 pandemic. She achieved early social media success with popular singles "Existential Crisis at the Tennis Club" (2024) and "Shapeshifting on a Saturday Night" (2025).

Following the latter song's success on TikTok, Cochrane signed with S-Curve Records and moved to Los Angeles to pursue music full-time.

She performed at the 2025 Bumbershoot Musical Festival in Seattle.

In 2026, her debut EP Male Validation and Other Drugs was released by Sonderview/S-Curve Records along with the single "Losing Streak". She also embarked on her first headline tour selling out shows in Los Angeles, Seattle, New York, and Philadelphia.

In March 2026, Cochrane performed at South by Southwest (SXSW) in Austin, Texas, as part of a showcase presented by The Luna Collective and Bright Antenna Records.

In April 2026, Teen Vogue profiled her while she was recording material for her first full-length album.

On September 9, 2026, Cochrane released the single "Toy Gun", which is the lead single from her debut album, Vengeance Through My Omnipresence, which is set for release on January 29, 2027.

Her fanbase is known as the "Coch Squad."

== Discography ==
Albums

- Vengeance Through My Omnipresence (2027)

Extended Plays

- Athletic Genius (2022)
- Male Validation and Other Drugs (2026)

Singles

2021:

- Chelsea Boots
- Wild at Heart
- Summertime
- Christmas, Baby!

2023:

- Chloe and the Jazz Singer
- Dunn Gardens
- Things I Wish You Said
- I'm Yours Again

2024:

- Standards
- Afraid to Die
- Existential Crisis At The Tennis Club

2025:

- Nothing Changes
- The Executioner
- Corporate Ladder
- Shapeshifting on a Saturday Night
- Shapeshifting on a Saturday Night (Alone in My Bedroom Version)
- Shapeshifting on a Saturday Night - The Remixes

2026:

- Griever
- Loneliness in Numbers
- Losing Streak
- Male Validation and Other Drugs
- Oh, Mercy!
- Sex, Etc.
- Toy Gun
- You're the Only One (I Never Performed For)
