= A. W. Piper =

American politician (c. 1828 – 1904)

Andrew William Piper
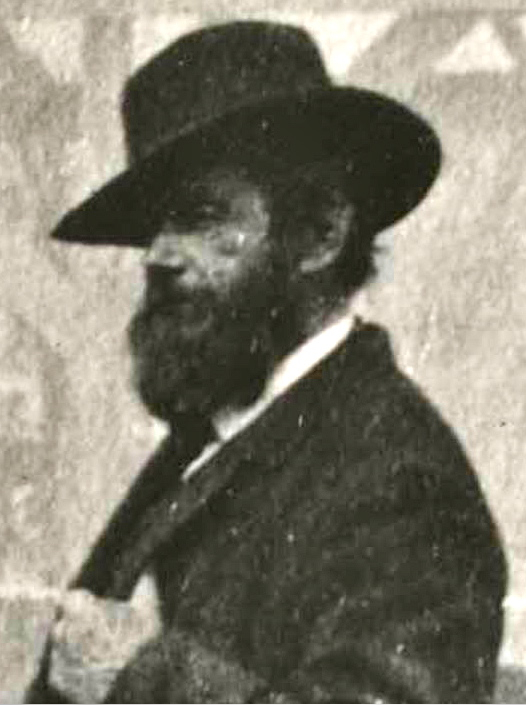
- Piper in 1883 by Henry Villard from Asahel Curtis' collection
- Born: ca. March 1828; Kissingen, Kingdom of Bavaria
- Died: November 11, 1904 (aged 76); Seattle, Washington, US
- Resting place: Lake View Cemetery, Lot 184; 47.633242°N 122.317098°W
- Citizenship: US
- Occupations: Baker, confectioner, artist, politician
- Organization(s): Puget Sound Candy Manufactory, aka Piper's Bakery
- Known for: Piper Orchard, Pipers Creek, Piper's Canyon, Carkeek Park, socialist member of Seattle City Council
- Notable work: "Piper's Cream Cakes"
- Political party: Socialist
- Spouse: Wilhelmina "Minna" Piper (1835–1930)
- Children: 11 children, incl. Oscar Albert Piper (1876–1968), Walter Piper

A. W. Piper (1828 – November 11, 1904) was a Seattle, Washington pioneer whose name was given to Piper Orchard, Pipers Creek and Piper's Canyon in Carkeek Park, and who was elected in 1877–1878 a socialist Seattle City Council member. He owned a bakery known for its artistic confections that served Seattle and the Puget Sound region.

== Life ==
Piper was born in Kissingen, Bavaria around March 1826. He was educated as an artist, and emigrated to America in 1847 at age 19. In New Orleans he met Wilhelmina ("Minna") Hausman (June 1834 – 1930), who was from the Hanover area of Germany, and had come to America in 1853. The 1900 Census showed they had been married for 48 years, since around 1852, or else they were married a little later, in San Francisco in 1853, crossing the Isthmus of Panama to get to California. They lived in San Francisco for 20 years, and their first five children were born there. Piper attended the San Francisco Mechanics' Institute, receiving a certificate for "best specimens of ornamental sugar work" dated September 1857.

By 1871 they were living in Victoria, British Columbia, where Piper was a confectioner on Government and Fort Streets. Three of the Piper's children were born in Victoria, and it was here that historian Thomas W. Prosch first met Piper. Prosch said Piper's store was popular and attracted visitors from around the region. An 1873 newspaper announcement said an Andrew William Piper, baker and confectioner of Government Street, declared bankruptcy in Victoria, B.C. on December 4, 1872.

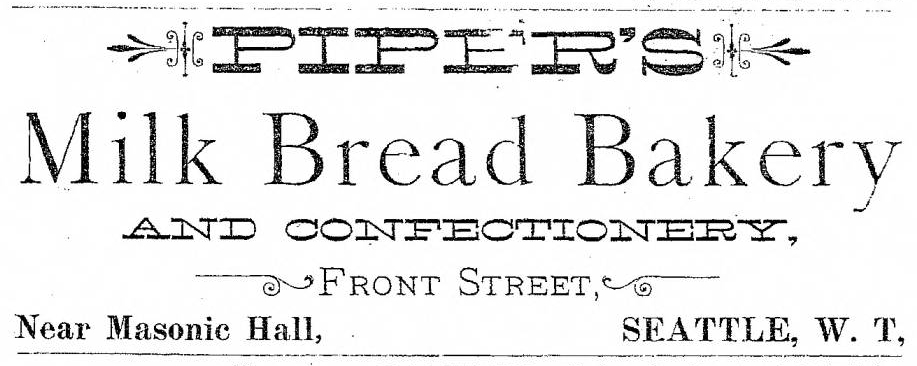
Advertisement for Piper's bakery, 1885

The Pipers came to Seattle in 1873. He owned a Bavarian style konditorei, the Puget Sound Candy Manufactory, in Seattle's Pioneer Square on Front St. between Cherry and Mill Streets. A typical konditorei is much more than a bakery, making candies and many other types of confections. He was known for his wedding cakes and other creative, artistic confections, including "Piper's Cream Cakes" (or "Dream Cakes") that were especially popular in the 1870s, made from a recipe Piper never revealed. By the 1880s Piper employed a number of assistants. Prosch said that Seattle's Lake Union often froze over in winter, and that in those days, before Seattle's ice factory was built in 1882, Piper would harvest large blocks of ice from the lake, which he saved until summer for making ice cream.

In 1876, A. W. Piper ran for Seattle City Council representing the Third Ward and lost, coming in fourth out of five candidates. On his second run, for the Third Ward again, he just barely won a seat on the council, in 1877, on the socialist ticket. From 1890 to 1896 the city charter was amended to use a bicameral system, made up of a House of Delegates with to members from each of the city's now eight wards, where previously there had been three wards, and a nine-member at-large Board of Aldermen. Piper ran for the Board of Aldermen in 1896, losing and coming third. He was also a socialist (or Populist) nominee for Seattle Mayor.

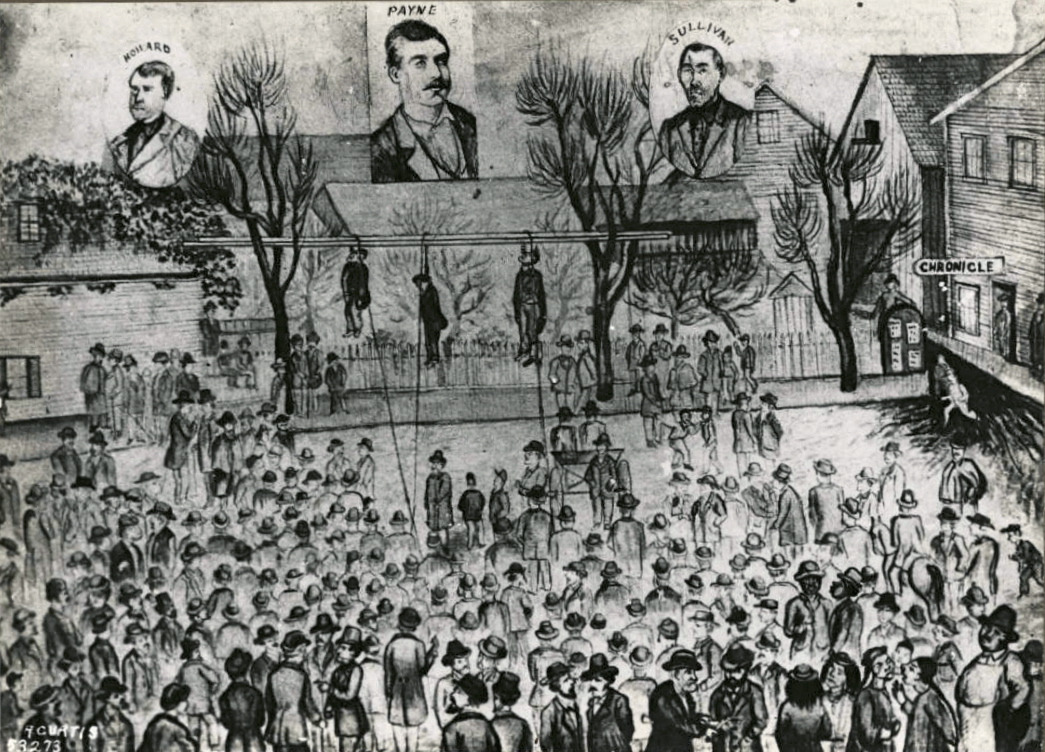
The lynching of 1882 drawn by A. W. Piper

Piper was known as an artist, having several unsigned paintings hanging in museums and the homes of pioneers, and he sculpted in clay and stone. He also drew political cartoons and news illustrations, including the lynching of three suspected murderers in Henry Yesler's yard in 1882. Many of the cartoons are in the University of Washington Libraries digital archives.

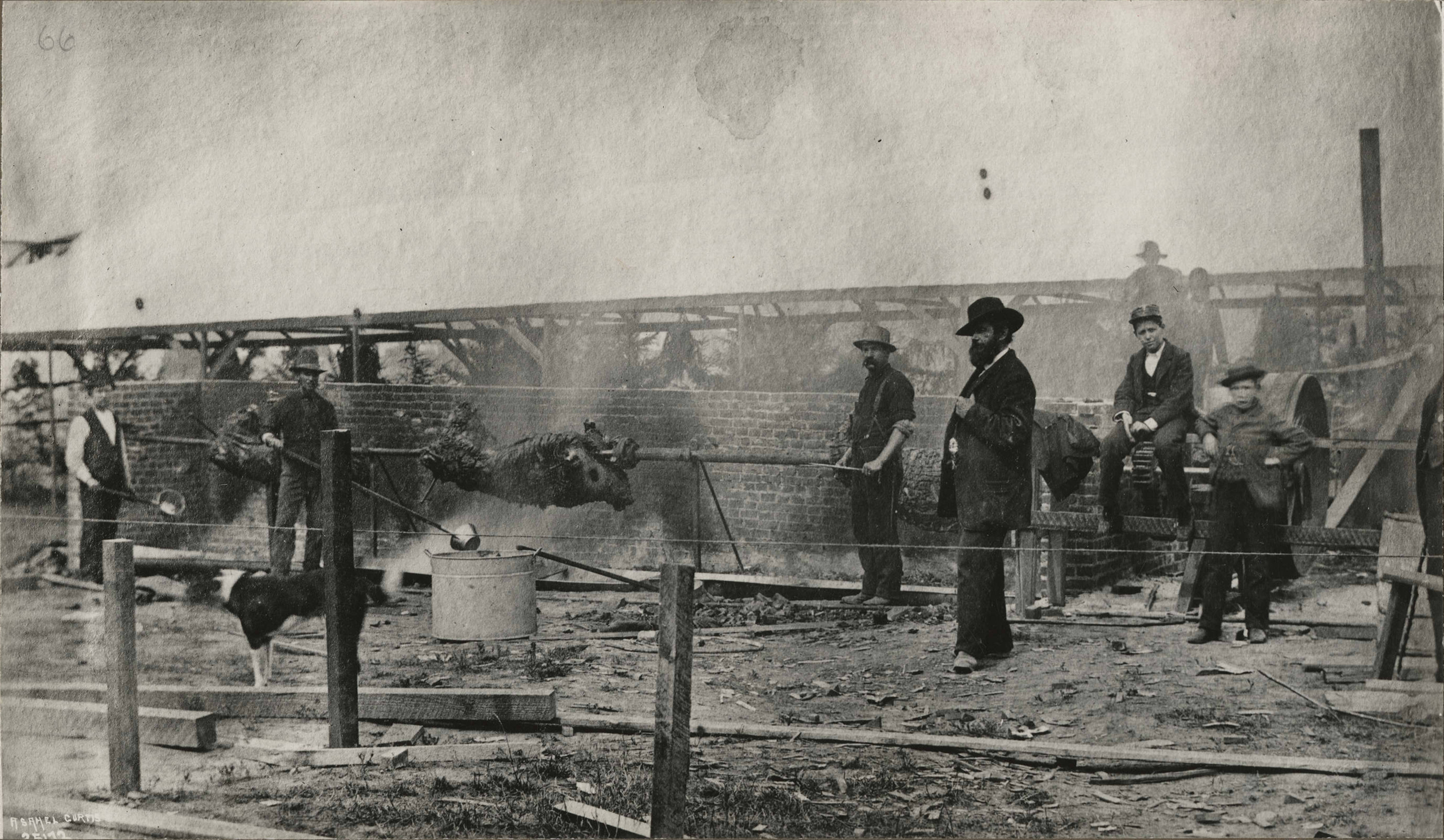
An Asahel Curtis photograph of Piper overseeing the Seattle barbecue to commemorate the completion of the transcontinental Northern Pacific Railroad September 14, 1883

On September 14, 1883, to commemorate the completion of the transcontinental Northern Pacific Railroad, celebrated that September 8 in Montana, Seattle threw its first potlatch with the railroad's president Henry Villard in attendance. Piper was put in charge of the jubilee's barbecue, held on the former grounds of the University of Washington.

Piper's bakery was destroyed in the Great Seattle Fire of June 6, 1889. All bakeries and candy makers in Seattle were destroyed in the Fire, and the industry reorganized afterwards, with some of the old businesses rebuilt and other new ones established. Piper did not rebuild, heading for Alaska instead.

The Portland Morning Oregonian of May 4, 1888, reported that a newspaper called the Enterprise, intended to rival the size of the Seattle Post-Intelligencer, was incorporated with $25,000 capital by Piper with W.E. Lockard, H.F. Jones, J.C. Mavel and J.F. McDonald, just over a year before the Great Seattle Fire. After the Fire he ran a bakery in a tent in Nome, Alaska, for two years, then returned to Seattle as a farmer and orchardist. Their 80-acre (32 ha) farm on Pipers Creek was founded c. 1880.

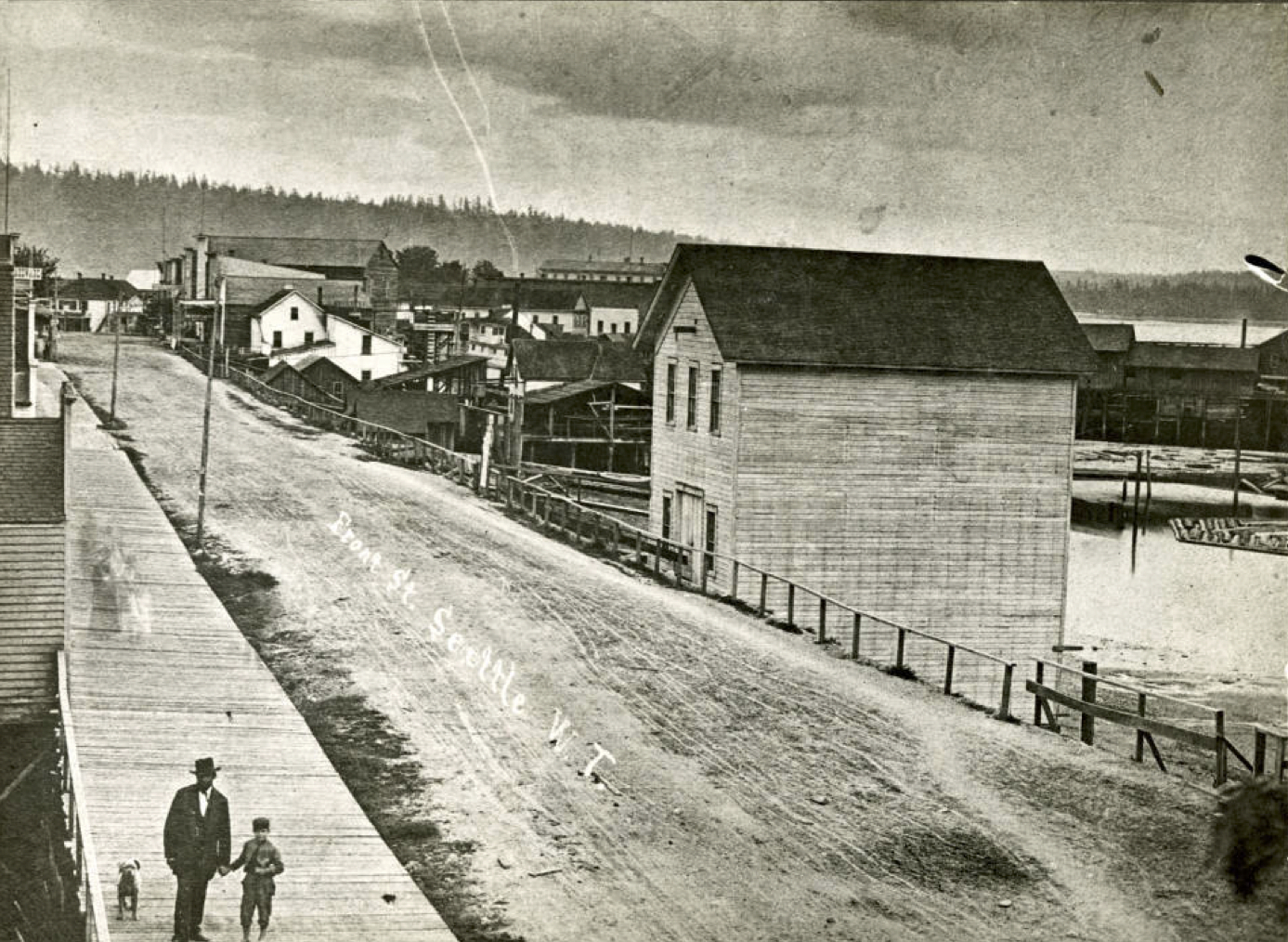
A. W. Piper and his son Walter (or Wallis) and their dog Jack on Front Street, now 1st and Madison, in Pioneer Square in 1880

The Pipers had 11 children, the first five born in San Francisco (1854, 1859, 1861, 1865, and 1867), three in Victoria, B.C. (1868, 1870 and 1873), and the last three in Seattle (1876, 1878 and the eleventh, born after 1879 and died by 1900).

Piper was a Freemason, president of Seattle Turn Verein (society) (see Turners; a liberal German movement which produced several members of the Revolution of 1848), and member of the Seattle Liederkranz, a German cultural club that sang and danced. He was also a member of the Pioneer Association of the State of Washington, a society of the state's early settlers, and he was one of the founders of the Seattle Chess Club and the Seattle Amateur Rifle Association.

Piper died at home, at 1523 Boren Ave., on November 11, 1904, at age 76, after a long illness. His funeral was at the Unitarian Church on Seventh Ave. and Union St. the following Sunday, November 13, under the auspices of St. John's Lodge No. 9, the local Masonic Lodge. He was buried at Lake View Cemetery, Lot 184.

== Piper legacy in Seattle ==
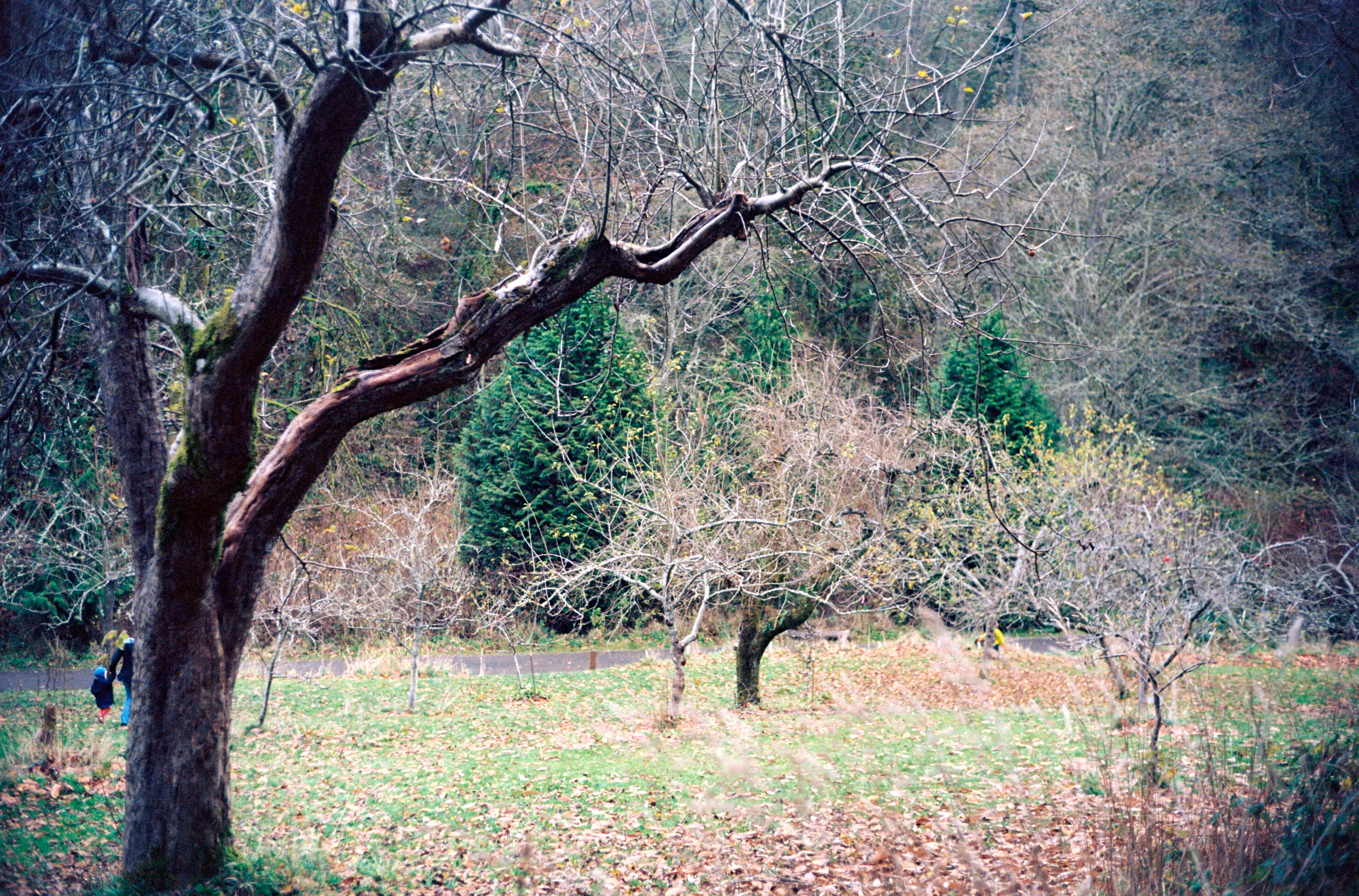
Trees over a century old still produce fruit in the restored Piper Orchard in Carkeek Park.

A. W. Piper may have been the first of several Socialists or Communists on the Seattle City Council, including Hugh De Lacy, elected in 1937, who was a secret member of Communist Party USA; and Kshama Sawant, who won a seat in 2013 representing the trotskyist Socialist Alternative. She served on the council from 2014 to 2024. Seattle elected socialist Katie Wilson running in the to mayor in 2025 on the Democratic Party line.

His property on Lake Washington became Naval Air Station Sand Point, what is now Seattle's Magnuson Park. Piper's farm and orchard at Pipers Creek are now part of Seattle's Carkeek Park. The trees are still productive, and an annual Festival of Fruit is held there.

The land at Carkeek Park, called "the Ranch" by the Piper family, had been previously logged twice, and A. W. Piper's eighth child, Walter (June 27, 1873, Victoria, B.C.–September 20, 1914, Seattle), tried to log the land a third time, but did not make money. Walter was a junior partner in the successful Piper & Taft Sporting Goods, which was later bought by Eddie Bauer.

Piper's son Oscar Albert Piper (b. 1876) was one of the University of Washington's first graduated engineers. He joined the United States Army Corps of Engineers, helped plan the Lake Washington Ship Canal, and served as Seattle's acting City Engineer in 1934 and 1936.

A. W. and Minna Piper were nominated as among the 150 most influential individuals in Seattle's history in the 2001 Museum of History and Industry–Seattle Times "Metropolist" project.

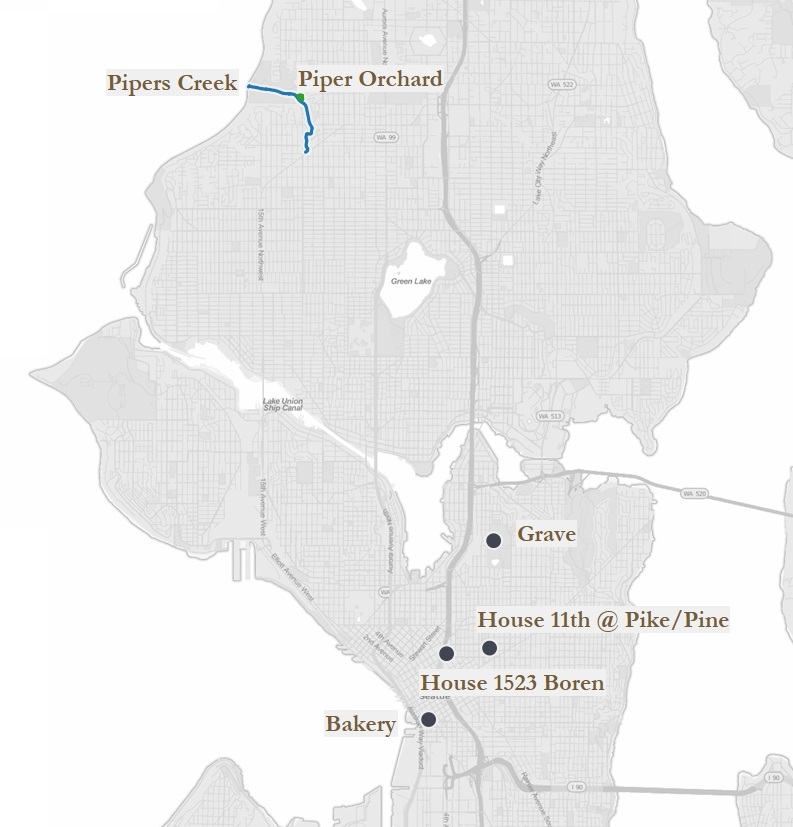
Map of Piper's sites in Seattle

== Election results ==
1876 City Council, Third Ward

| Candidate | Votes |
|---|---|
| William N. Bell (winner) | 74 |
| C.W. Moore (winner) | 54 |
| Thomas J. Jackson | 30 |
| A.W. Piper | 28 |
| Reuben Doyle | 23 |

1877 City Council, Third Ward

| Candidate | Votes |
|---|---|
| Arthur A. Denny (winner) | 72 |
| A.W. Piper (winner) | 35 |
| William N. Bell | 35 |

1896 Board of Aldermen, Fifth Ward

| Candidate | Votes |
|---|---|
| George F. Raymond (winner) | 462 |
| Gus Brown | 326 |
| A.W. Piper | 125 |
