= Piper Orchard =

Fruit orchard in Seattle, Washington, U.S.

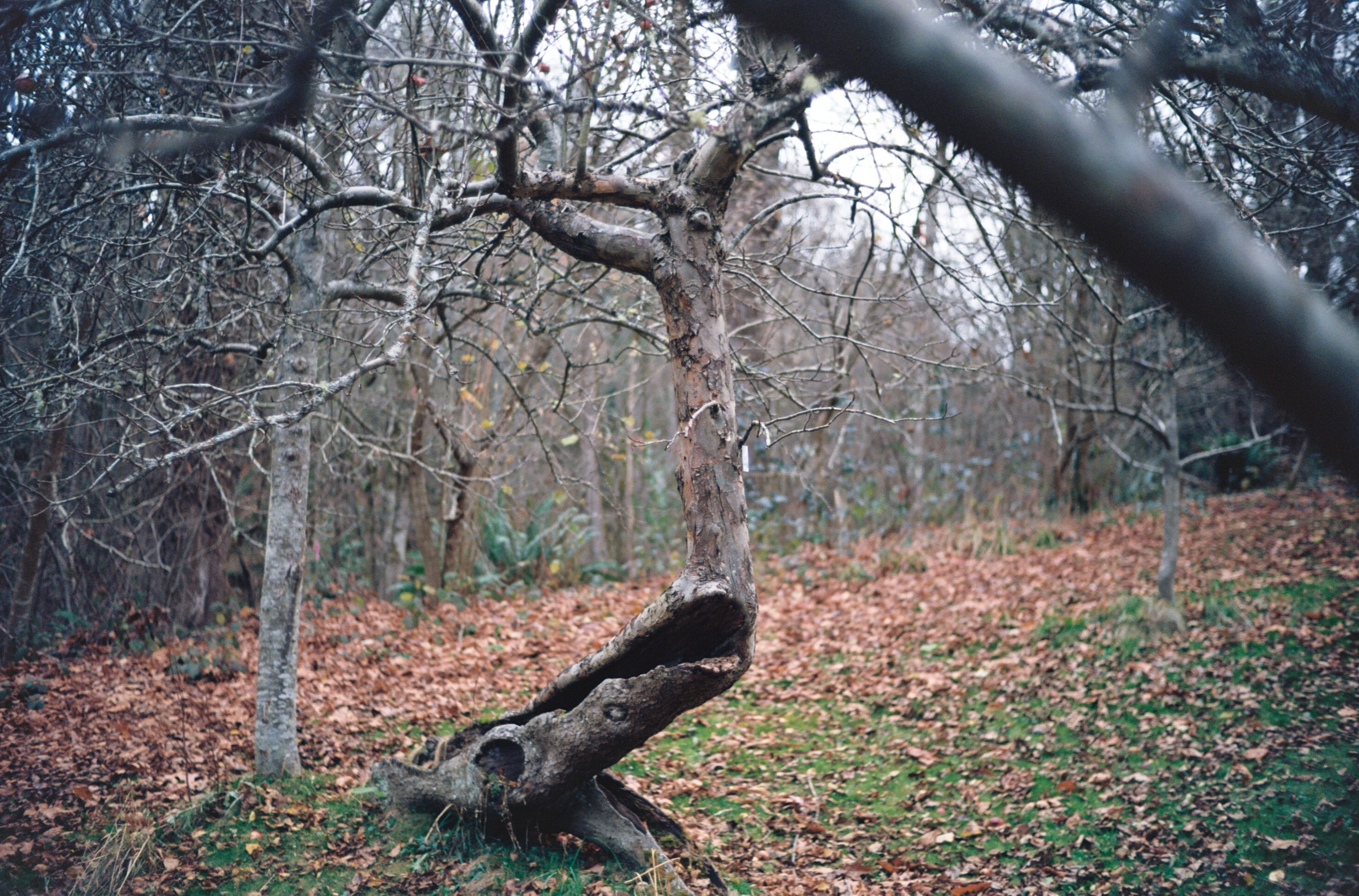
- A century-old Wealthy apple tree in Piper Orchard, bent and hollow but still bearing fruit in 2013.
- Interactive map of Piper Orchard
- Type: Orchard
- Location: Seattle, Washington
- Coordinates: 47°42′35″N 122°22′00″W
- Area: 216 acres (0.87 km^{2})
- Created: 1890s
- Operator: Seattle Parks and Recreation

Piper Orchard, the oldest public orchard in Seattle, is located in Carkeek Park and features primarily heirloom apple trees. It was established in the late 19th century by A. W. Piper, a local confectioner and member of the Seattle City Council, following the Great Seattle Fire of 1889. The orchard was a key part of the Piper family's homestead, which was maintained into the early 20th century. After being largely forgotten, the orchard was rediscovered in the 1980s, leading to restoration efforts. Today, the orchard is maintained by volunteers and Seattle Parks staff and is the site of community events, including an annual Festival of Fruit.

== History ==
=== Early ===
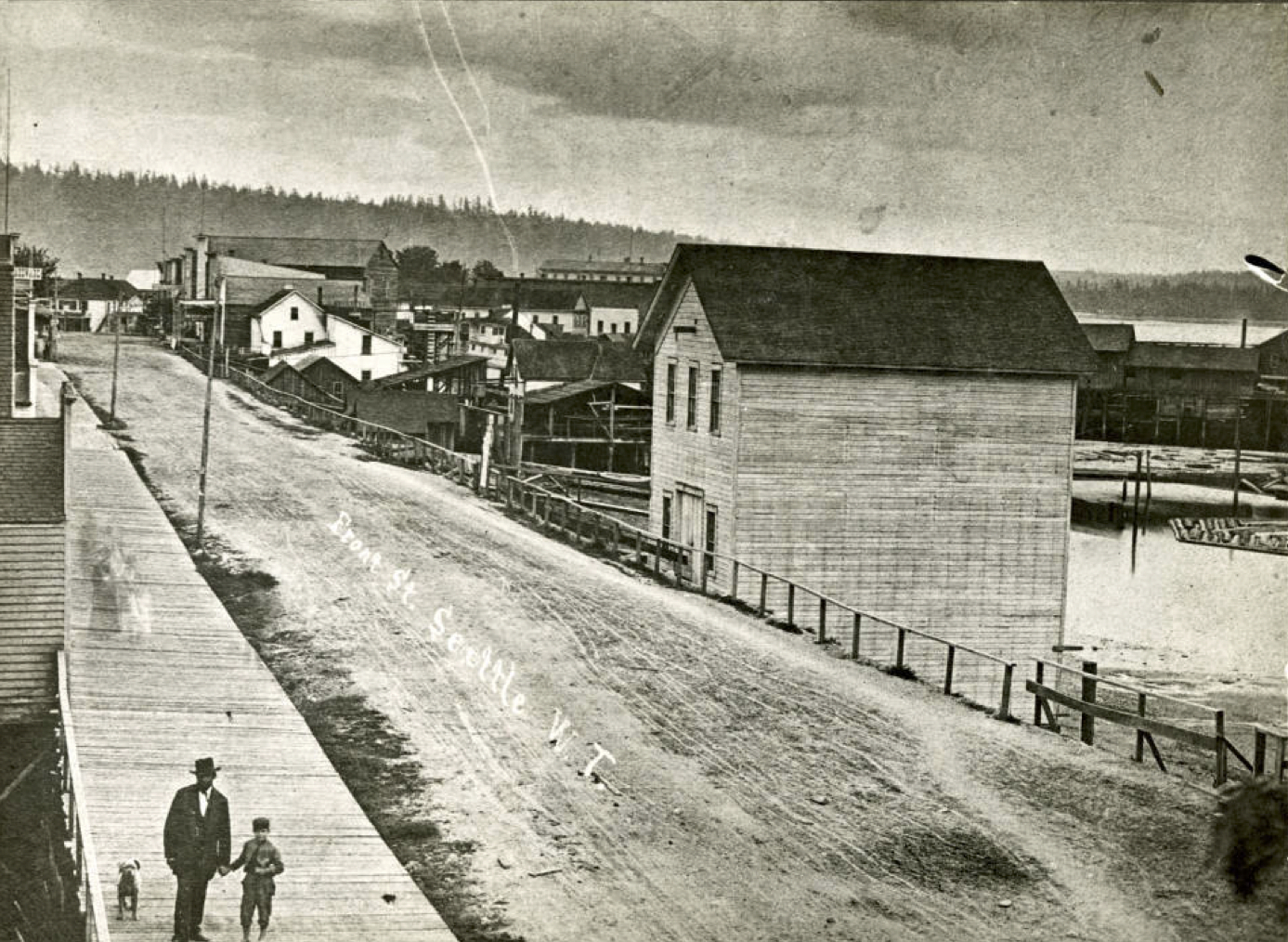
A.W. Piper and son Walter in 1880.

Piper Orchard was founded by A. W. Piper, a notable settler and confectionist, following the Great Seattle Fire of 1889. The fire devastated Piper’s downtown business, the Puget Sound Candy Factory, prompting the family to relocate. Piper, who also served as a socialist member of the Seattle City Council, moved his large family from their downtown home on Boren Avenue to a former lumber camp in what is now Piper’s Canyon.

By the early 20th century, the Piper property had become a utopian, back-to-the-earth homestead for the Piper family. The orchard, set on a hillside above Pipers Creek, was primarily tended by Piper's wife, Wilhelmina (Minna), and later, their son Paul. Minna Piper was known for her skills in gardening and grafting, raising flowers and vegetables that the family would transport to market by horse and wagon.

After Andrew Piper's death in 1904, his son Paul took over the duties of taking the orchard's produce to market.

=== Carkeek Park & Lost Period ===
Seattle established Carkeek Park in 1929, covering the entire canyon, including Piper's Orchard. During the 1930s, Depression-era workers built trails and benches throughout the park.

The orchard was forgotten after the Piper family relocated, and its existence remained unknown until 1981.

=== Rediscovery and Restoration ===
In 1981, landscape architect Daphne Lewis was hired to survey Carkeek Park for a master plan. In the process she rediscovered the orchard. For the following two years, Lewis and volunteers worked to clear trails into the orchard from the surrounding park.

In 1983, a group of volunteers began clearing away overgrowth that had hidden the orchard from most people. The Adopt-A-Park office of the Seattle Department of Parks and Recreation encouraged the work. Twenty-nine surviving fruit varieties were discovered on the 1.5 acres (0.61 ha) cleared of overgrowth. A tree planting grid of 20-foot (6.1 m) squares was apparent from the locations of the surviving trees, most of which are apple and were available in 1890. Included are Wealthy, King, Gravenstein, Dutch Mignone, Red Astrachan, Rhode Island Greening, Bietigheimer, and Esopus Spitzenburg. There are also several pear, cherry, and chestnut trees.

== Current status ==
The orchard has about 50 fruit and nut trees arranged in a grid labeled A-L and 1-16. Since the 1984 restoration, around half of the trees have been added or grafted from old stock.

Maintenance is a joint effort between Seattle Parks employees and community volunteers, coordinated by the Friends of Piper Orchard in partnership with the Carkeek Park office of Seattle Parks. Work parties are held most months on the third Saturday for pruning, cleanup, and other maintenance tasks.

The orchard and its history were recently profiled in the Seattle Times Pacific NW Magazine.

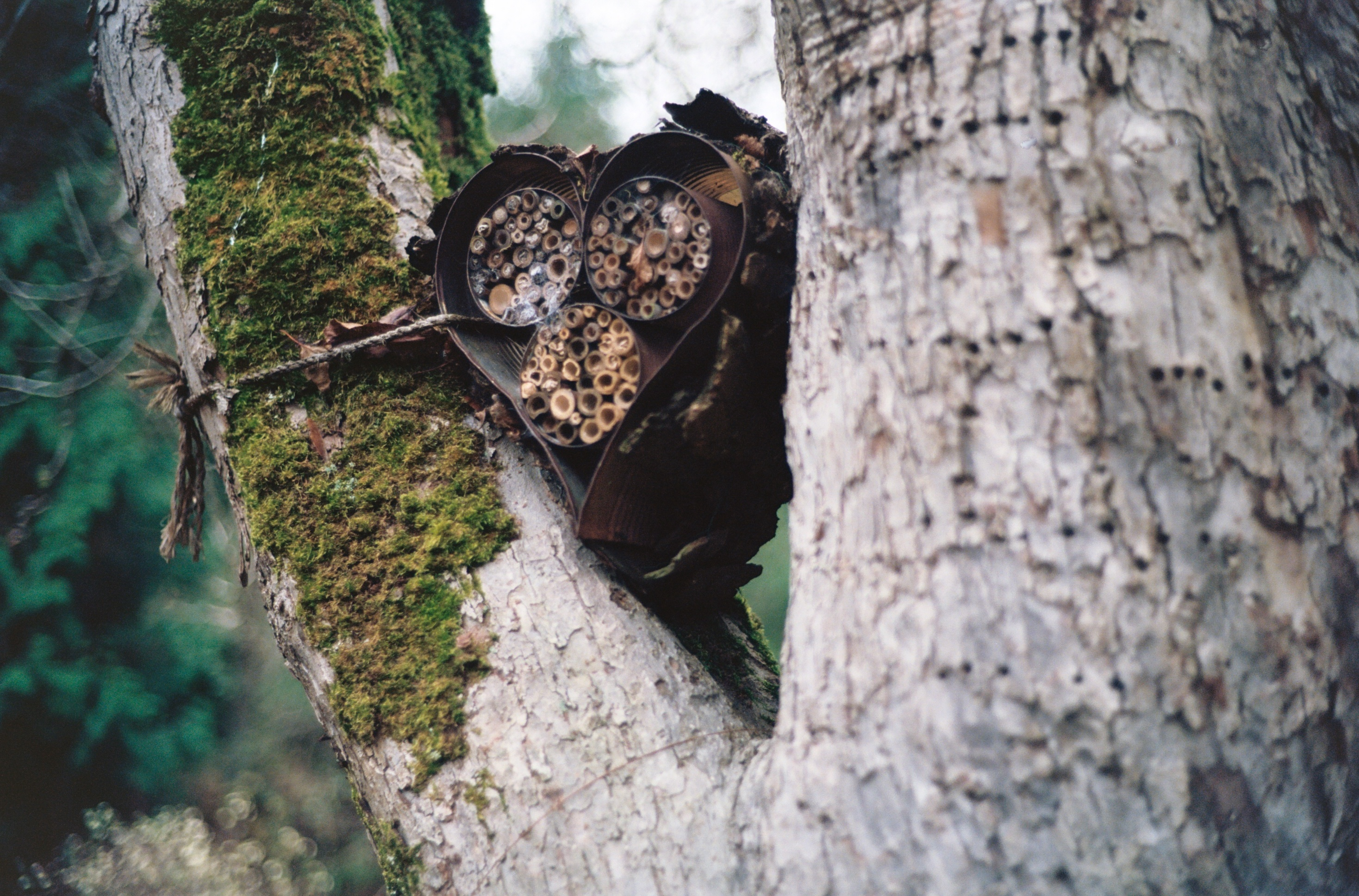
An apple tree with sapsucker holes drilled in it, and a mason bee house attached.

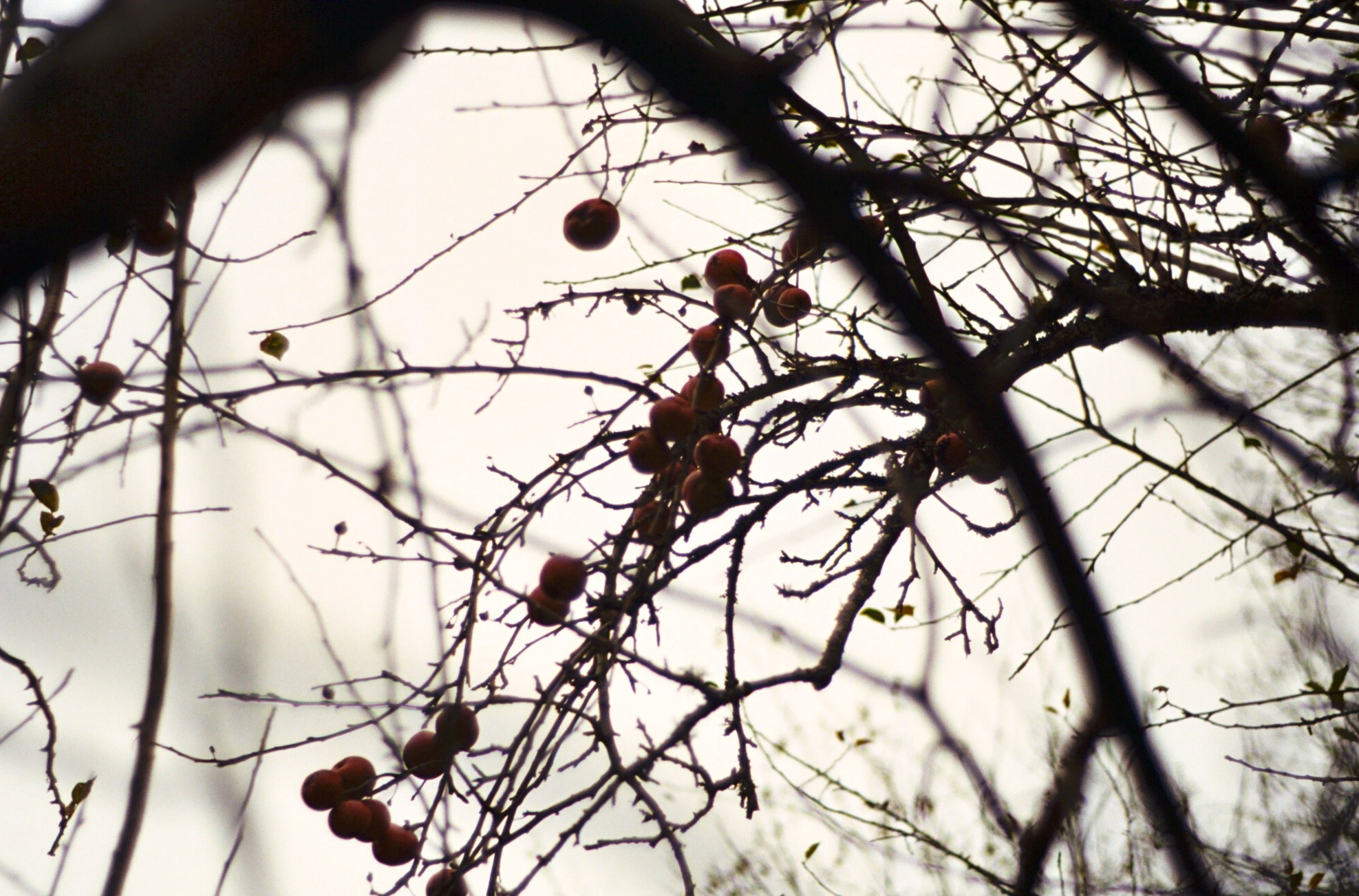
Fruit on hawthorn tree

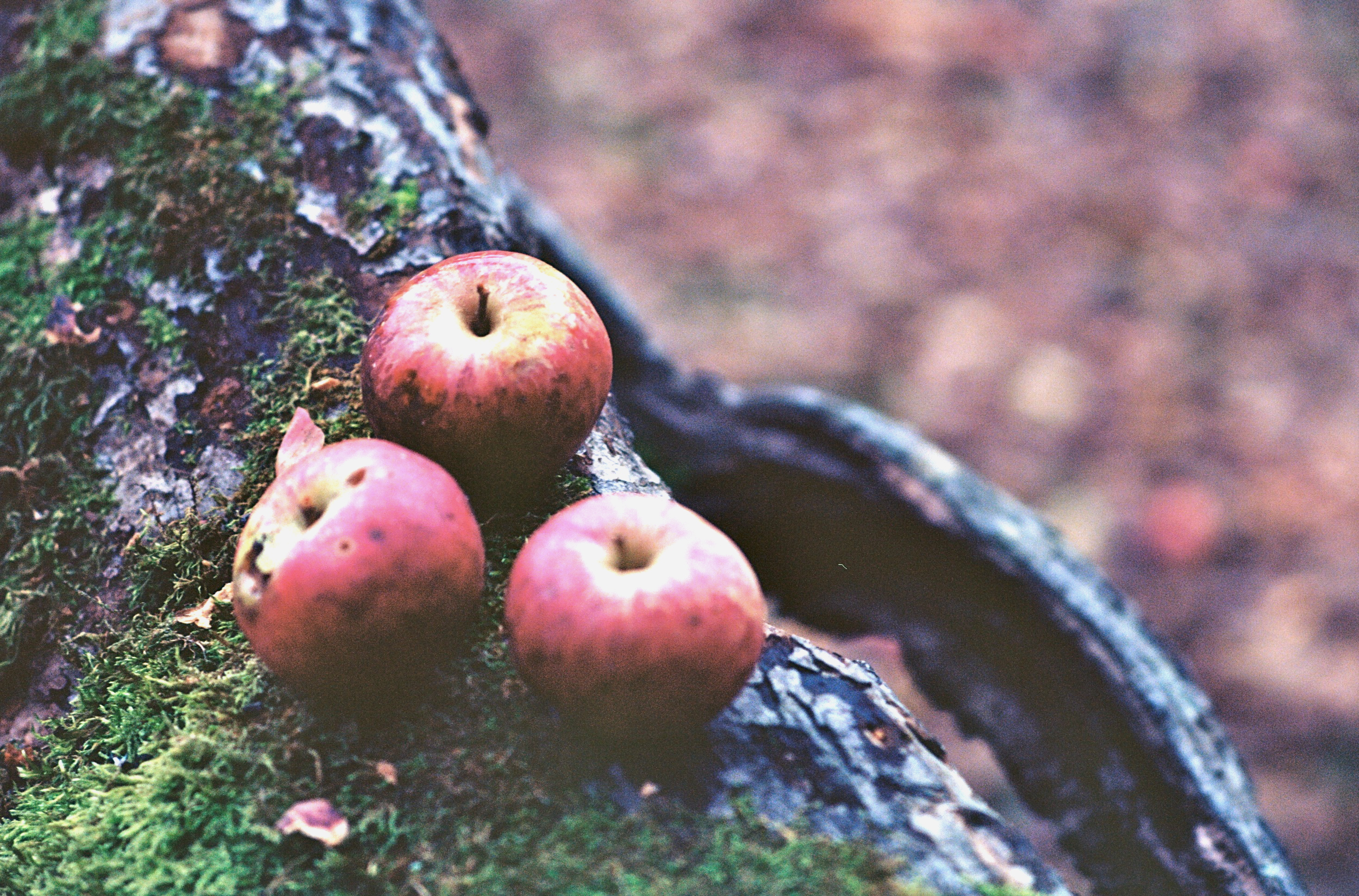
Wealthy apples

=== Festival of Fruit ===
An annual Festival of Fruit has been held at the orchard since 2007, where, among other activities, visitors can participate in an apple pie baking contest or taste heirloom apple varieties from Piper Orchard.
