= Crown Hill, Seattle =

Neighborhood in Seattle, Washington, United States

Coordinates: 47°41′44″N 122°22′20″W

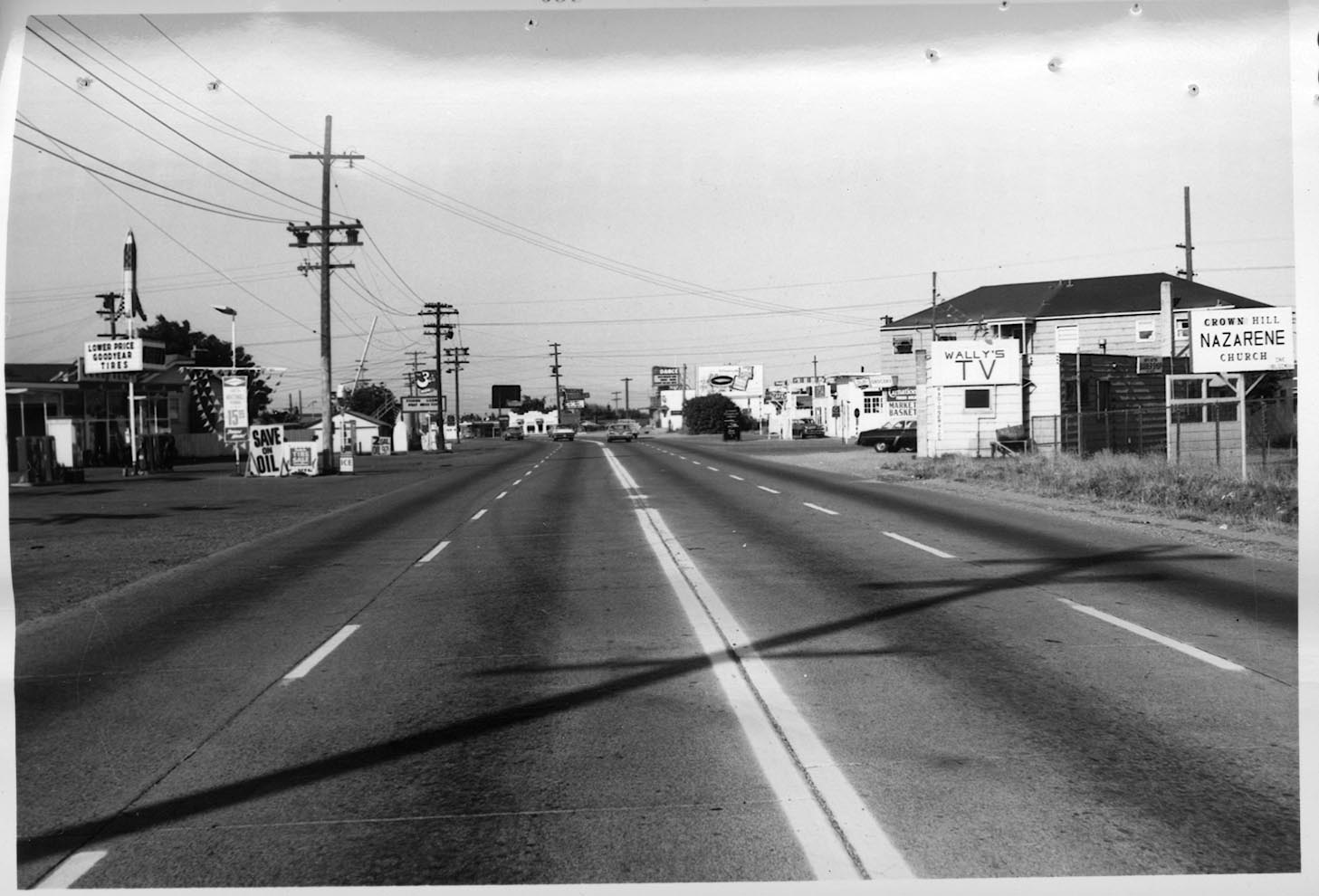
Holman Road in Crown Hill in 1959

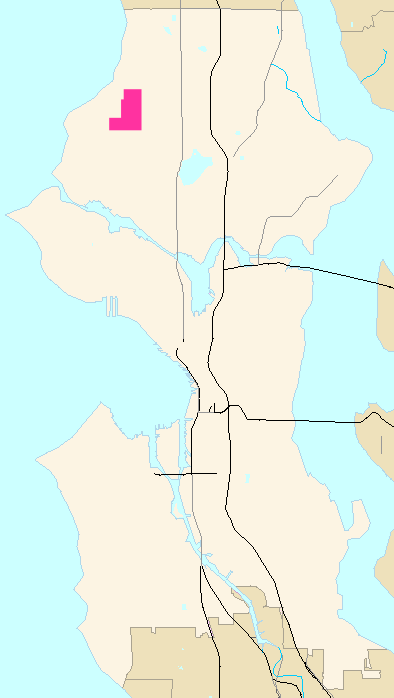
Crown Hill

Crown Hill is a neighborhood in the city of Seattle, Washington, United States.

The neighborhood is bounded on the south by N.W. 85th Street, beyond which is Loyal Heights & Whittier Heights, followed by Ballard; on the east by 8th Avenue N.W., beyond which is Greenwood; on the north by NW 105th Street, beyond which are (from east to west) Broadview, Carkeek Park, and Blue Ridge, and on the west by 15th Avenue N.W., beyond which are (from east to west) Loyal Heights, Sunset Hill and Golden Gardens Park. It is part of the parcel of formerly unincorporated King County that was annexed by Seattle on January 4, 1954.

The Crown Hill Cemetery is located in the neighborhood.
