= Kent Kammerer =

American teacher and activist (1933–2011)

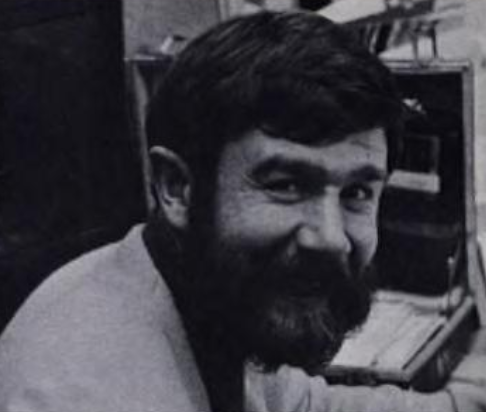
Kent Kammerer pictured in the 1976 Lincoln High School yearbook

Kent Ronald Kammerer (1933 – November 11, 2011) was an American teacher and activist. A resident of Seattle for his entire adult life, he was known as an opponent of dense redevelopment in Seattle and as a "defender of Seattle neighborhoods."

== Early life, education and family ==
Kammerer was born and raised on a farm near Council Bluffs, Iowa. When he was a boy, his family moved to Tacoma, Washington, where his father worked at The News Tribune. Kammerer's father died in an apartment fire during Kammerer's youth, and his mother died of cancer a few years after that, leaving him orphaned at 16. After living with relatives in Lakewood, he graduated from Clover Park High School in 1951 and matriculated at Seattle University, where he studied art and education.

Kammerer met his future wife, Sonja Elken, at Harborview Medical Center, where she was a nurse and he worked as an orderly. They married in 1956 in Seattle and had two daughters.

== Teaching career ==
Beginning in 1957, Kammerer taught art, photography and visual communications (a class that combined photography, printing and graphic design) at Hamilton Junior High School and Lincoln High School in the Wallingford area of Seattle. He built Lincoln High School's first darkroom and would take students on hiking and camping trips in a home-built camper to photograph mountains and beaches in the North Cascades or Olympic Peninsula. One former student described him as a "nonconformist. The way he taught us, he would lay out the basics, give you an understanding of how you did something, then he would kick back and let discovery take effect."

Kammerer retired from teaching in 1982, after Lincoln's closure, and worked as a handyman.

== Neighborhood activism ==
Kammerer's activism began in his home neighborhood of Greenwood. He objected to the development of an apartment building that he said would draw excessive traffic to streets in the child-heavy neighborhood. He also advocated for crosswalk installation.

Kammerer co-founded the Seattle Neighborhood Coalition (SNC) in the 1990s and served as its president. He warned in the 1990s that members of the coalition had been targeted by strategic lawsuits against public participation, and that some of the members took on extra homeowners' insurance coverage to protect against economic losses from the lawsuits. As president of the SNC, Kammerer hosted a monthly breakfast at a diner in Ballard where local civic leaders participated in Q&A sessions. Journalist Knute Berger described this gathering as a meeting of "Seattle's biggest grumps," which he said was a compliment: "These civic activists are old-school mossbacks—neighborhood folks who are often dismissed as gadflies, NIMBYs, cranks, or worse. I think they should wear those epithets as badges of honor: You can dismiss someone as a not-in-my-backyard type because they stand against so-called progress, but often they are also the people on your block who actually give a damn. Think of them as civic P-Patch tenders who do the hard, dirty work of keeping Seattle livable." Berger described Kammerer as a "wise Yoda-like presence" in the meetings.

After initially supporting the Seattle Monorail Project, Kammerer later opposed it on the grounds of insufficient transparency, reduced carrying capacity and a lack of planned bus connectivity. Kammerer supported the unsuccessful initiative in 2004 to stop the project. After the monorail project was eventually wound down, Kammerer wrote on Crosscut.com that its "financing was so flawed that the system of paying for it simply wouldn't work. In some ways it was little more than the classic ponzi scheme." In 2009, Kammerer wrote an article for Crosscut that warned against "greens pushing transit-oriented development" (TOD) and arguing against efforts to mandate TOD zoning at the state level.

== Death ==
On November 11, 2011, Kammerer died from cancer at age 78.
