= Loyal Heights, Seattle =

Neighborhood in Seattle, Washington, United States

Coordinates: 47°40′59″N 122°23′03″W

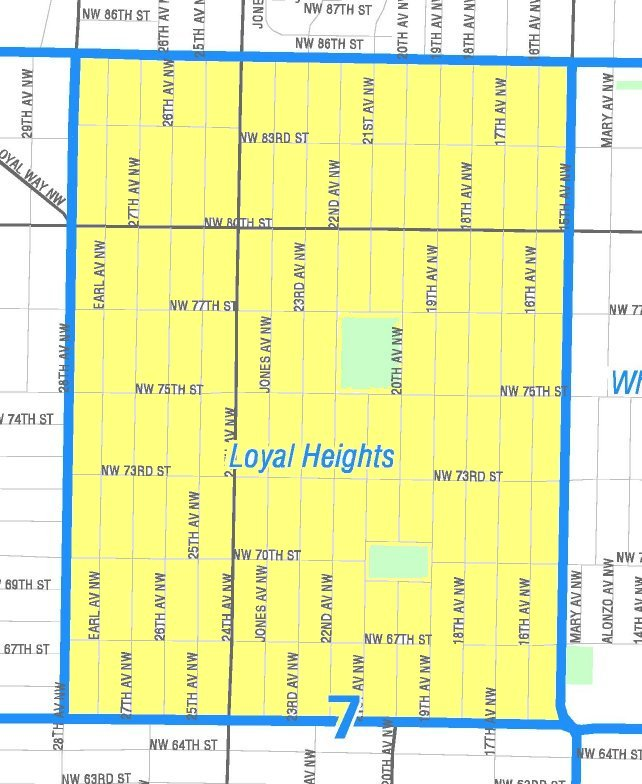
Map of Loyal Heights

Loyal Heights is a neighborhood in Seattle, Washington. It is considered part of greater Ballard.

The neighborhood is bounded to the west by 28th Avenue NW, beyond which is Sunset Hill; to the north by NW 86th Street, beyond which are North Beach and Blue Ridge; to the east by 15th Avenue NW, beyond which is Whittier Heights; and to the south by NW 65th Street, beyond which is central Ballard.

Loyal Heights was established by businessman Harry Whitney Treat in 1906 as part of the independent city of Ballard. Named for his daughter Loyal Graef Treat, the area would be plotted for development as a streetcar suburb after the construction of a new electric streetcar line operated by the Loyal Railway Company.

In 1907, the city of Ballard—including Loyal Heights—was annexed into the city of Seattle.

The city built an elementary school in the neighborhood in 1932, and opened a playfield in 1941.
