= Pipers Creek (Seattle) =

Stream in Seattle, Washington, U.S.

Coordinates: 47°42′42″N 122°22′48″W

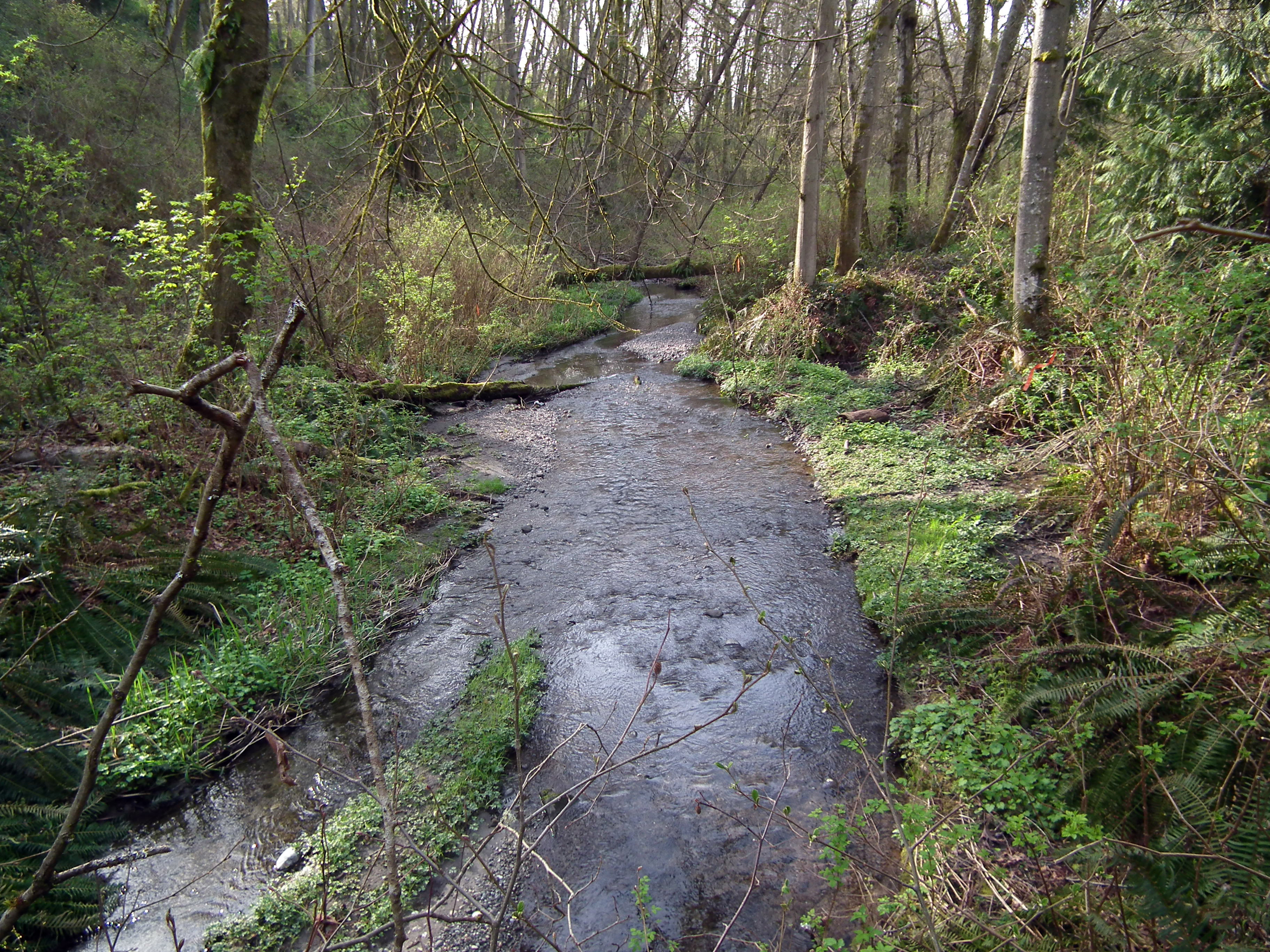

Location
- Country: United States
- State: Washington

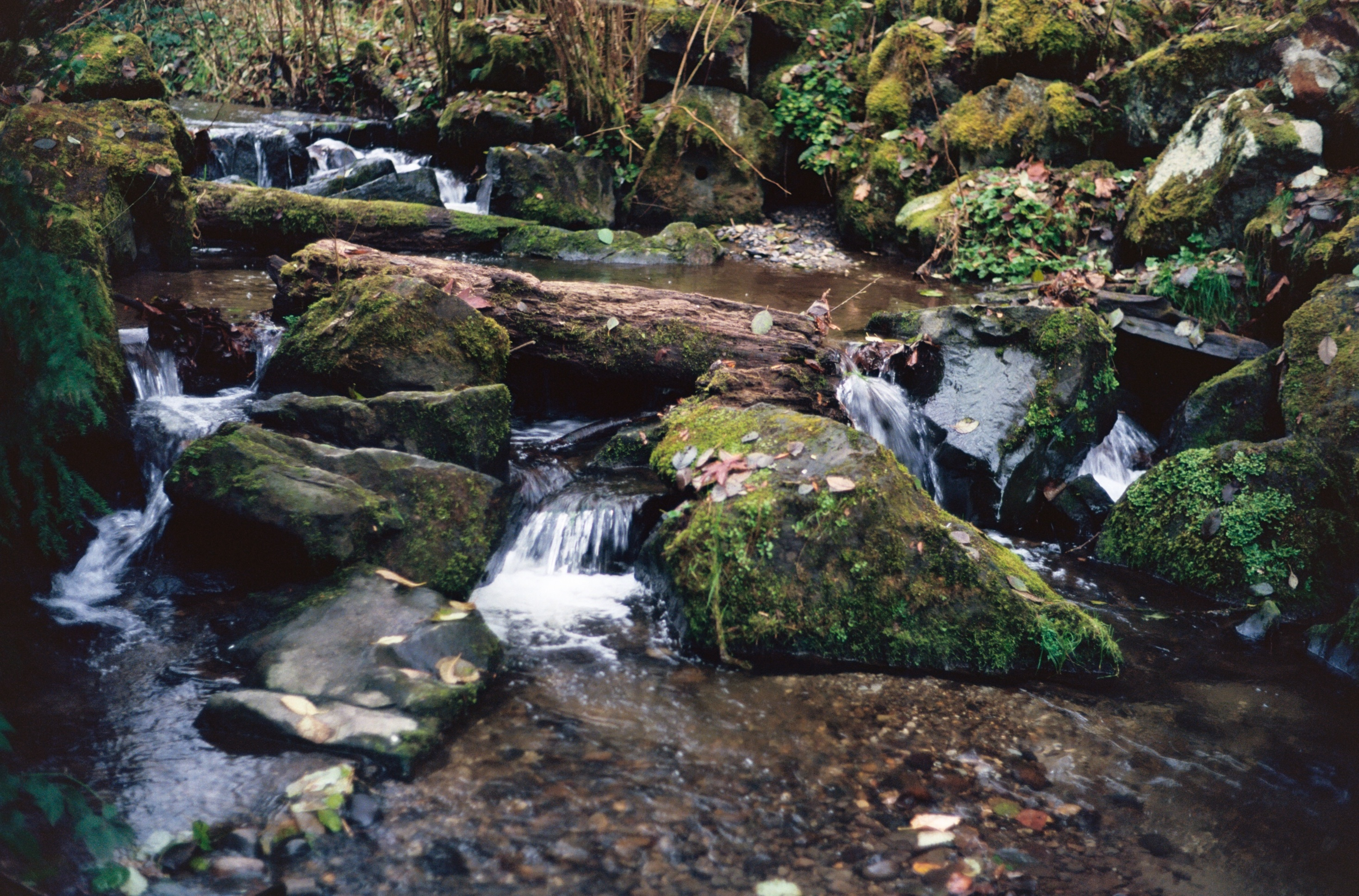
Pipers Creek in Carkeek Park

Pipers Creek is a 1.4-mile (2.3 km) urban stream that is located in the Broadview and Blue Ridge neighborhoods of Seattle, Washington, in the United States.

== Course and features ==
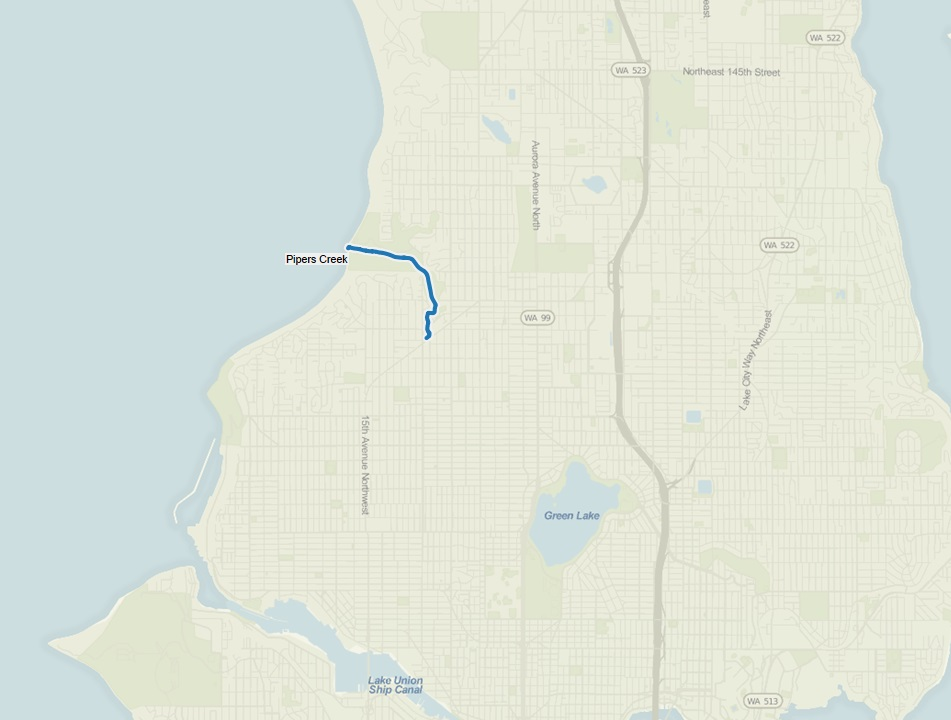
Map of Pipers Creek in relation to north Seattle

The entire length of the creek is within the boundaries of Carkeek Park, and its mouth is at Puget Sound.

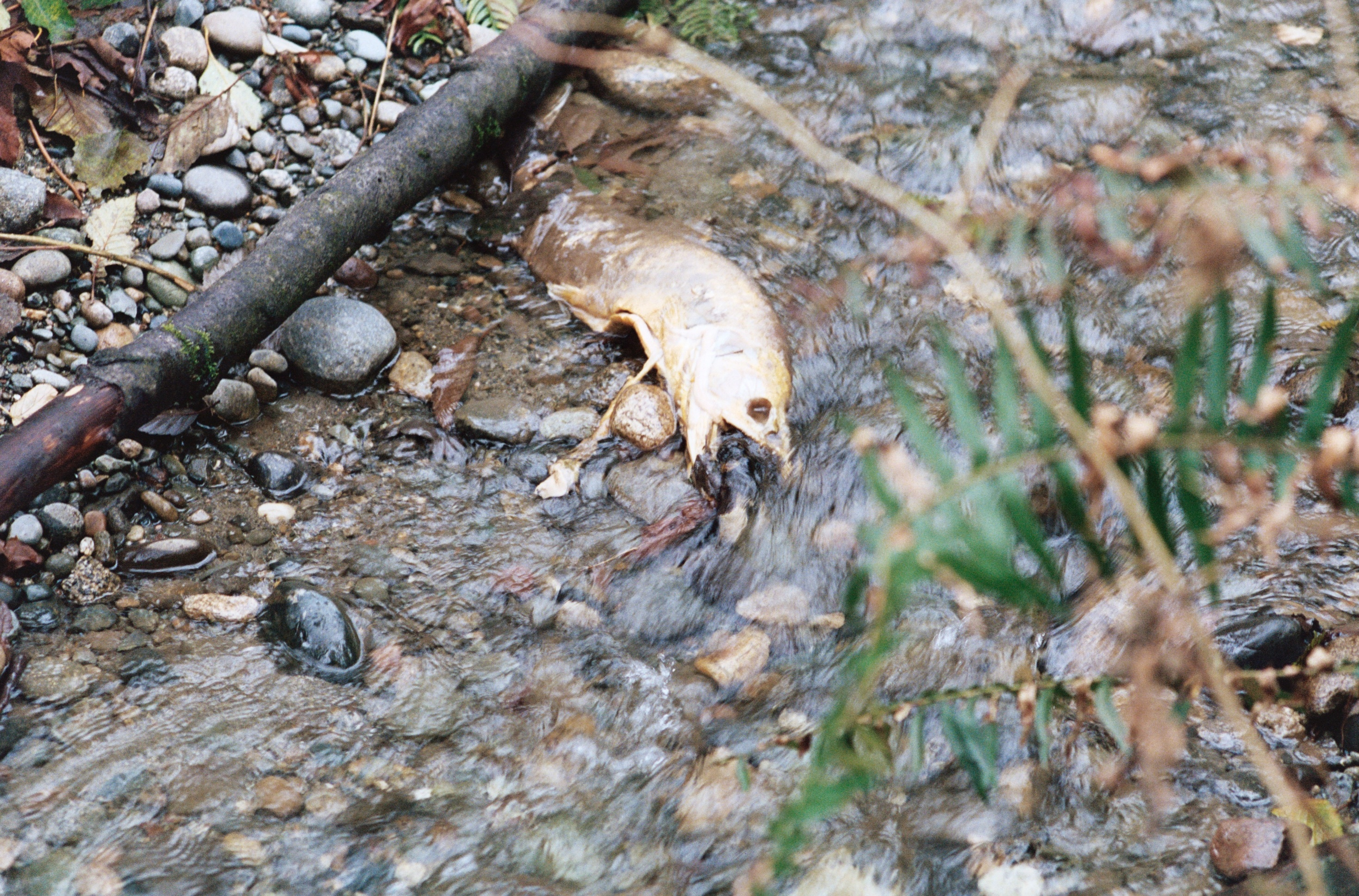
A salmon that died after spawning in Pipers Creek in November 2013

Its tributaries are Venema Creek and Mohlendorph Creek. The creek was renamed "Piper's" by white settler A. W. Piper, but now apostrophe is often left out. The Duwamish tribe call the creek "Dropped Down" (Lushootseed: qWátub).

Daylighted Mohlendorph Creek is mostly within the boundaries of Carkeek Park. It receives Venema Creek and empties into Pipers Creek near the mouth on Puget Sound.

Most of daylighted Venema Creek is within Carkeek Park. It empties into Mohlendorph Creek, just west of the Carkeek Park Environmental Education Center. Today some salmon come to the stream to spawn.

== See also ==
- Boeing Creek
- Daylighting (streams)
- List of rivers of Washington (state)
- Water resources

== Bibliography ==
- "Carkeek Park". Seattle Parks and Recreation. August 8, 2006. Archived from the original on January 31, 2000.
- Sherwood, Don (June 20, 2003). "Carkeek Park" (PDF). PARK HISTORY: Sherwood History Files. Seattle Parks and Recreation.
