= Broadview, Seattle =

- Seattle Neighborhood
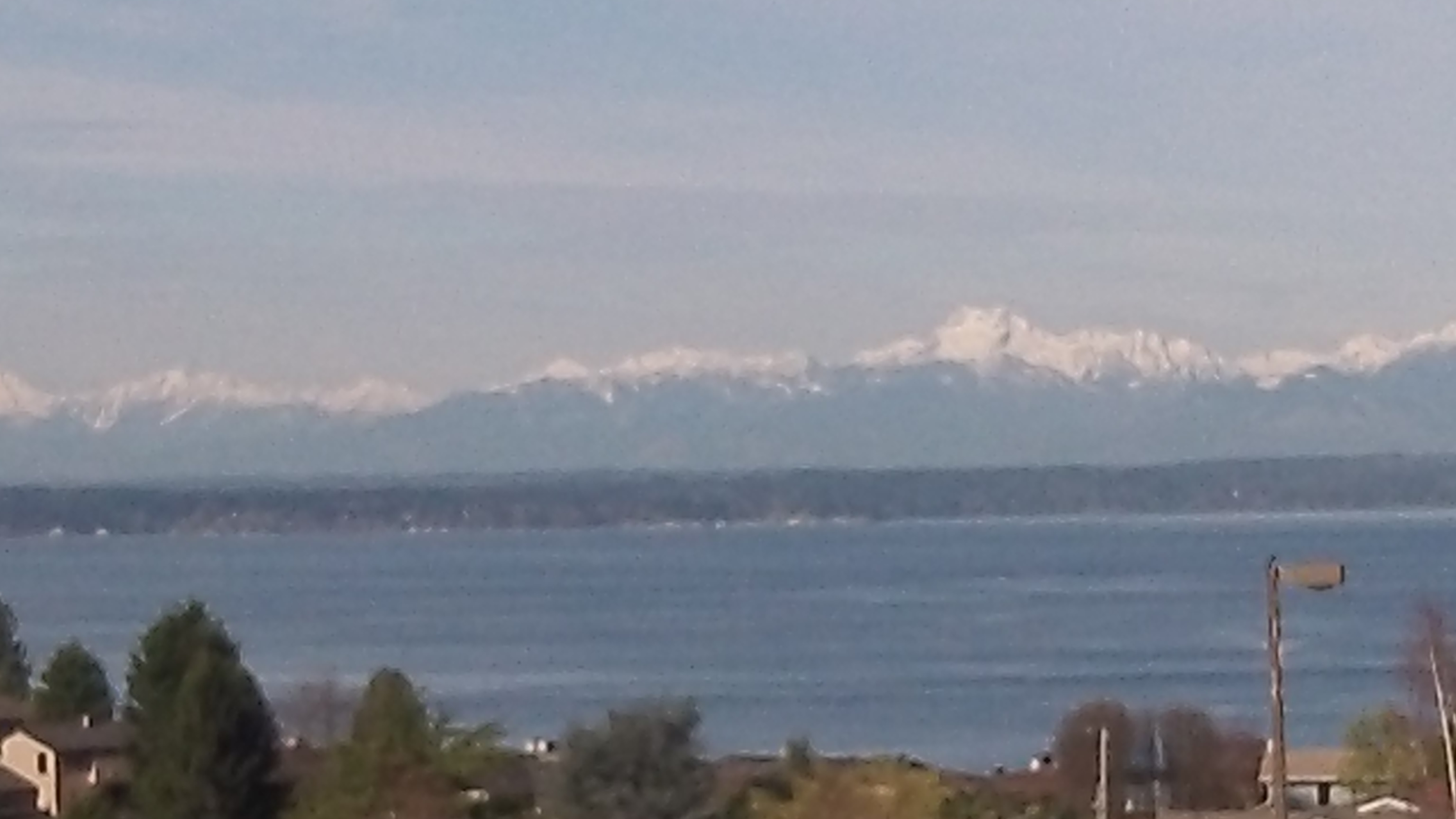
- View of the Olympic Mountains and Puget Sound from Broadview

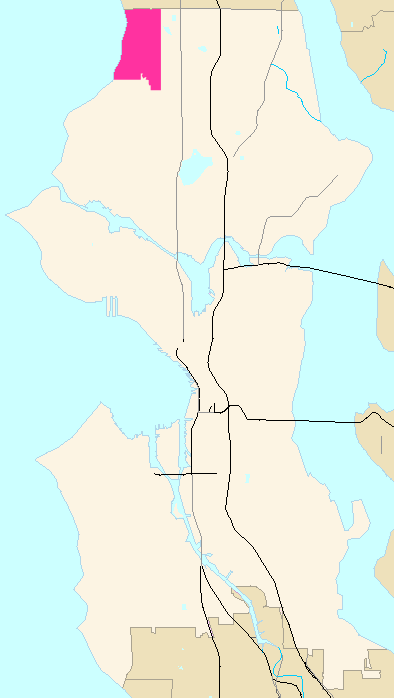
- Coordinates: 47°43′14″N 122°22′03″W
- Country: United States
- State: Washington
- County: King
- City: Seattle
- ZIP Code: 98177
- Area code(s): 206, 564

Broadview is a neighborhood in northwestern Seattle, Washington, United States. It is at the northwestern corner of the city, adjacent to Puget Sound and the city of Shoreline to the north. The neighborhood is predominantly residential and includes portions of Carkeek Park.

== Name ==
The name "Broadview" was given to the neighborhood because of its panoramic views of the Puget Sound and Olympic Mountains, which can be viewed to the west from its steep, westerly hillsides.

== History ==
Farmers began to settle in Broadview and neighboring Bitter Lake in June 1889, after the Great Seattle Fire. These farmers had to float their goods into Seattle via the Puget Sound, because there were no roads at the time. Eventually, logging began in the area.

Broadview and neighboring Bitter Lake were annexed into the City of Seattle on January 1, 1954. The neighborhood's first residential areas had been developed while it was unincorporated, leading to a lack of sidewalks on most minor streets.

== Geography ==
Broadview is bounded on the west by Puget Sound; on the north by the Seattle city limits at N.W. 145th Street, beyond which is The Highlands community in the city of Shoreline; on the east by Greenwood Avenue N., beyond which lies the neighborhood of Bitter Lake; and on the south by Carkeek Park, beyond which, from west to east, are the neighborhoods of Blue Ridge, Crown Hill, and Greenwood.

On the western edge of Broadview is a bluff, below which runs the BNSF Railway mainline along Puget Sound. The neighborhood has several waterways, including Broadview Creek, which flow for 2,600 feet (790 m) from its headwaters near Northsite Road into Puget Sound.

== Parks and attractions ==
Carkeek Park occupies the southwest corner of the neighborhood along the shoreline; within it is Pipers Creek. On the northwest side of Broadview bordering the Highlands, the 9-acre (3.6 ha) Llandover Woods Greenspace is home to native habitats and hiking areas. It was acquired by the city government in 1995 and had been preserved due to limited residential development in the area. The greenspace includes old-growth forests and habitats for owls, eagles, and mountain beavers.

== Landmarks ==
The Dunn Gardens were constructed in 1915 using a plan by the Olmsted Brothers, the landscape architects who designed many of Seattle's major parks. The grounds are open for public tours and maintained by volunteers under the direction of the E.B. Dunn Historic Garden Trust, which owns the property.

The Seattle Public Library system has a branch library in Broadview that opened on January 3, 1955. It replaced a King County Library System branch in the same building that had been established in 1944 after lobbying from local community groups. A new library building at Greenwood Avenue and North 130th Street was approved in 1967, but funding was held due to city appropriations needed to renovate Sicks' Stadium for use by Major League Baseball. The Broadview Library opened on January 25, 1976, and had a collection that was designed for its suburban clientele. The library was renovated in 1988 and expanded in 2007 using funding from the 1998 Libraries for All bond measure.

== Demographics ==
According to HistoryLink, the population of Broadview is approximately 13,000. The area is mainly residential.
