= Bitter Lake, Seattle =

Bitter Lake
- Neighborhood
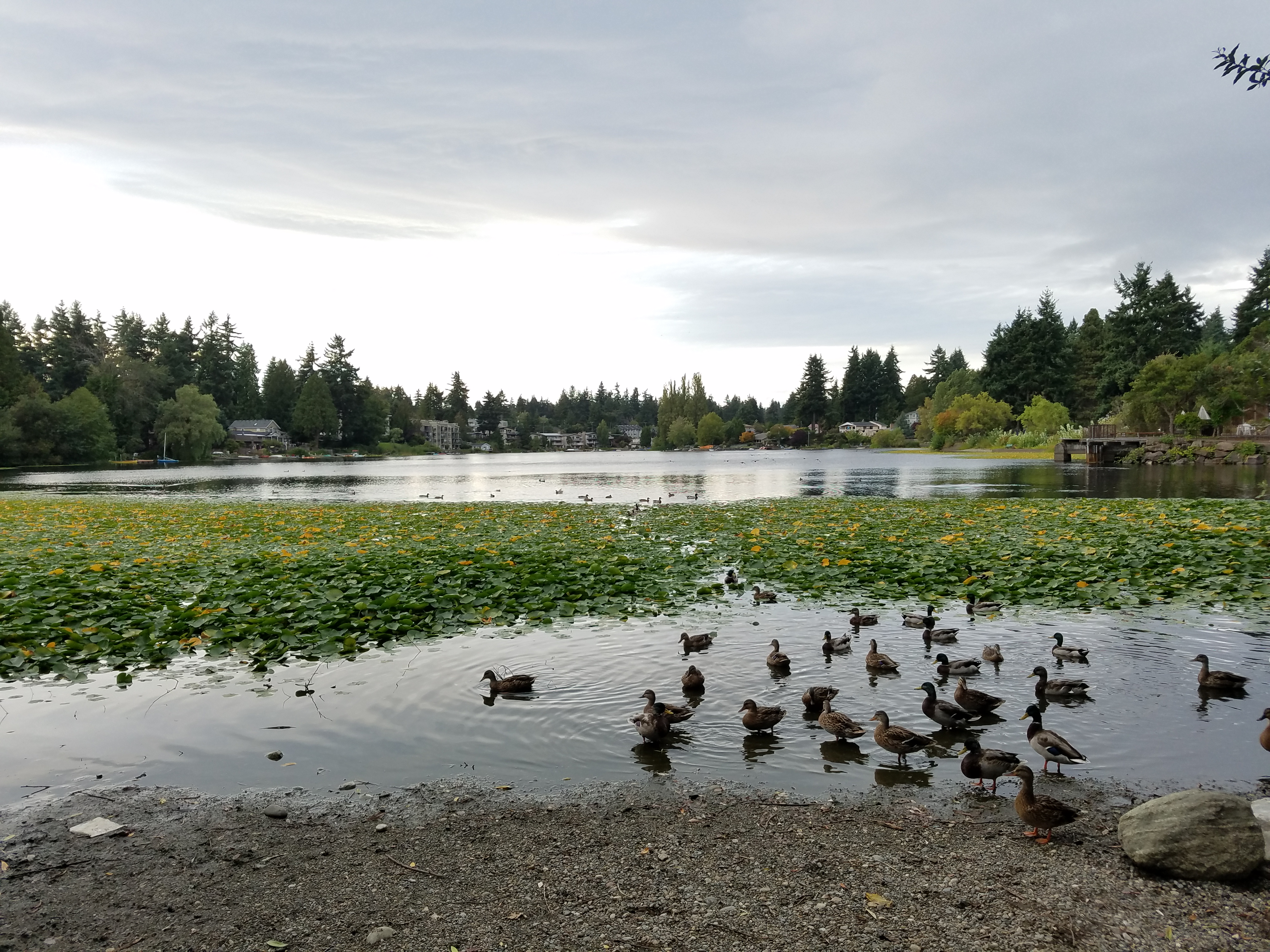
- Bitter Lake on a cloudy afternoon
- Etymology: Bitter Lake
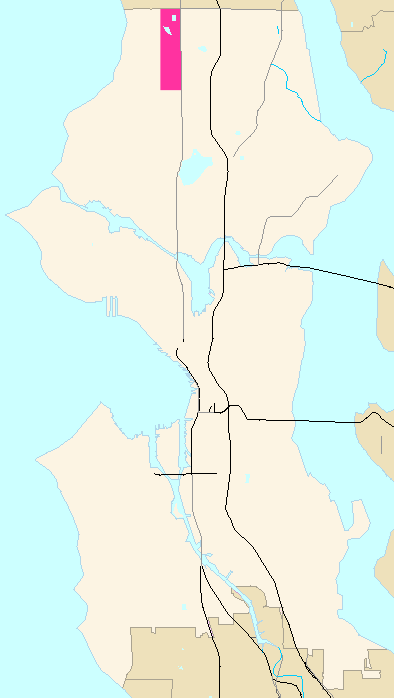
- Bitter Lake

- Location within Washington (state)
- Coordinates: 47.726°N 122.351°W
- Country: United States
- State: Washington
- City: Seattle

Bitter Lake is a neighborhood in Seattle, Washington, United States, named after its most notable feature, Bitter Lake. It was a mostly natural forest of Douglas-fir and Western Redcedar, inhabited by Native Americans, until the late 19th century. Development especially picked up when the Seattle-to-Everett Interurban streetcar reached the lake in 1906. A sawmill operated in the area until 1913, when most of the trees had been cut down.

== Geography ==
To its east, across Aurora Avenue N., is the neighborhood of Haller Lake; to its west, across Greenwood Avenue N., is Broadview; to its north, across N. 145th Street, is the city of Shoreline; and to its south is Greenwood. N. 130th Street is often considered its southern boundary, although some place it further south, at N. 125th Street, N. 115th Street, or even N. 105th Street.

== History ==
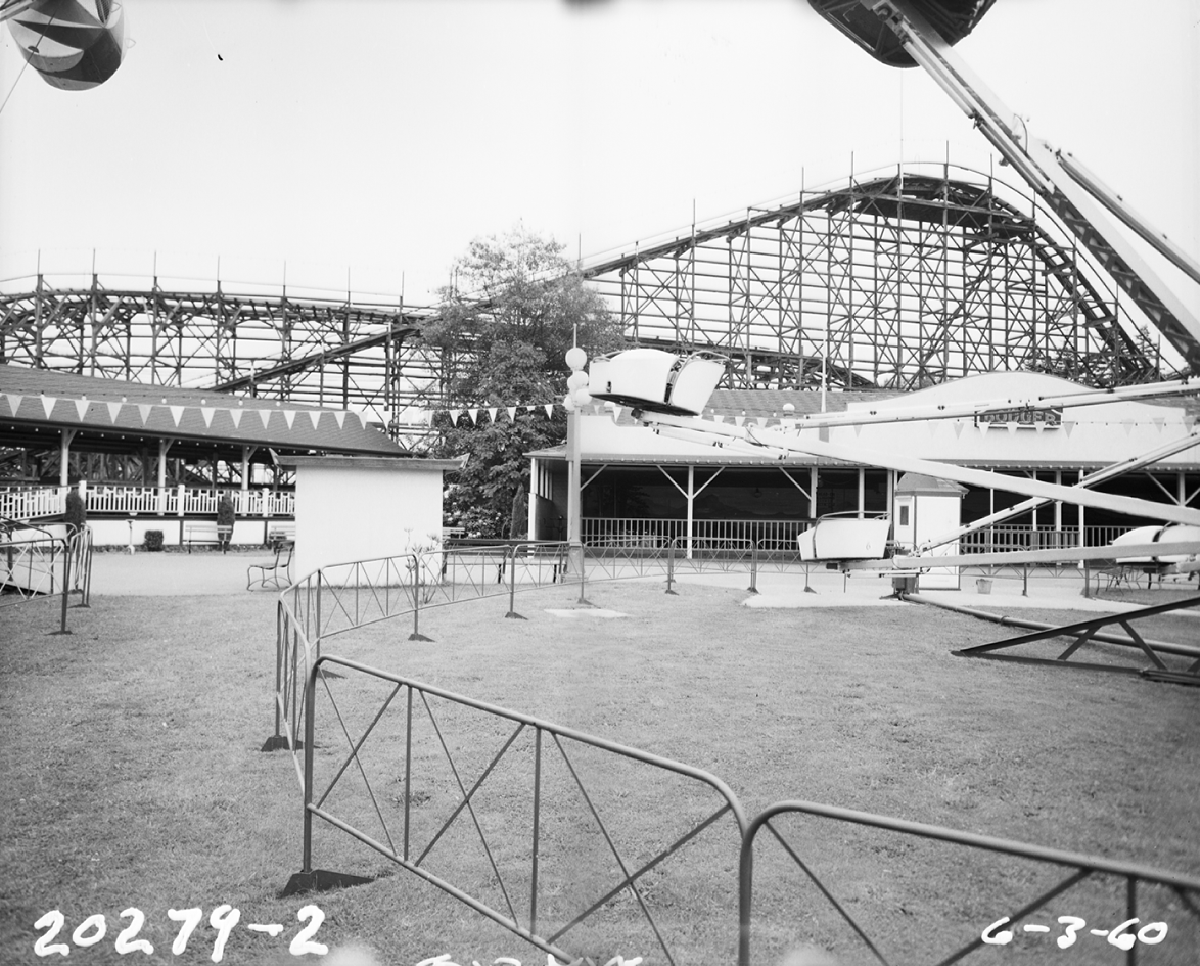
Playland, 1960

Bitter Lake played a more prominent role in Seattle at mid-20th century when it was not yet officially part of the city. From May 24, 1930 to 1961, it was home to Playland, one of several amusement parks built by the Washington Amusement Company. It was purchased a year after it opened by Carl E. Phare, a designer and builder of roller coasters, who designed The Dipper, a roller coaster with 3,400 feet (1,000 m) of track and a maximum altitude of 85 feet (26 m). Other notable attractions included The Canals of Venice, 1,200 feet (370 m) of darkness that may have been Seattle's most famous makeout spot for two generations, and a 9,600-square-foot (890 m^{2}) hardwood floor dance pavilion. During the Great Depression, it was home to dance marathons and flagpole sitting contests.

The 12-acre (49,000 m^{2}) amusement park, with parking for 12,000 cars, closed at the end of the 1961 season, under three economic pressures: the rise of television, the rising value of its lakefront real estate, and the impending Century 21 Exposition (the 1962 Seattle world's fair), which would dwarf a relatively small amusement park on the edge of town.

Part of the site of Playland is now the R.H. Thomson Elementary School; the Bitter Lake Community Center sits near the onetime site of the Dipper.

== Parks and recreation ==
The neighborhood is home to Bitter Lake Park. A $2.5 million renovation began in 2023 to its restrooms and for the installation of new playground equipment that would bring the park into compliance with various codes for safety and accessibility.
