= Dutch Mignonne =

Apple cultivar

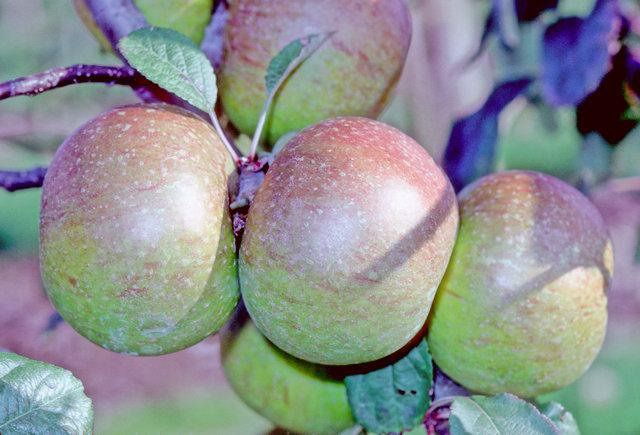
- Dutch Mignonne apples on the tree.
- Genus: Malus
- Species: domestica
- Origin: Holland

Dutch Mignonne is an apple cultivar originating from the Netherlands.

This cultivar is a Dutch medium-sized (71x60mm) apple introduced to England in about 1820 by Georg Lindley. A dual purpose apple, it is picked in early October and used from November to February. Its skin is greenish-yellow, with an orange-red flush. The stalk is long and slender in a narrow russeted cavity of medium depth. The flesh is cream-coloured, crisp, and juicy.
