= Blue Ridge, Seattle =

Neighborhood in Seattle, Washington

Coordinates: 47°42′10″N 122°22′42″W

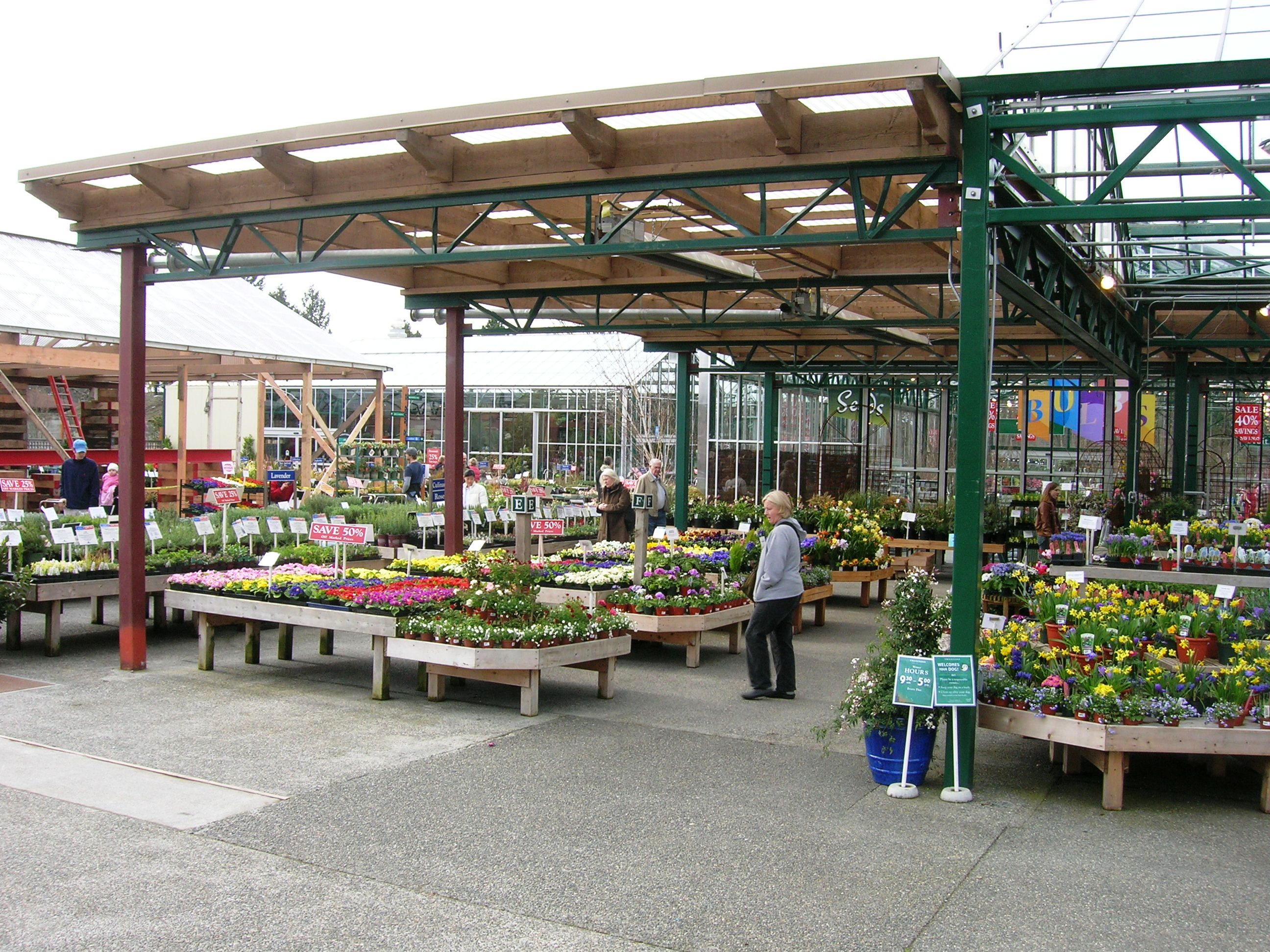
Swanson's Nursery in Blue Ridge

North Beach / Blue Ridge is a neighborhood in the city of Seattle, in the U.S. state of Washington.

The neighborhood is bounded on the south by Northwest 100th Street, beyond which lies Crown Hill; on the east by 12th Ave NW, beyond which lies Greenwood; on the north by Carkeek Park; and on the west by Puget Sound.

The North Beach / Blue Ridge neighborhood has panoramic views of the Puget Sound and the Olympic Peninsula. Blue Ridge specifically is governed by a homeowners association with significant architectural restrictions.
