= Carkeek Park =

Park in Seattle, Washington, U.S.

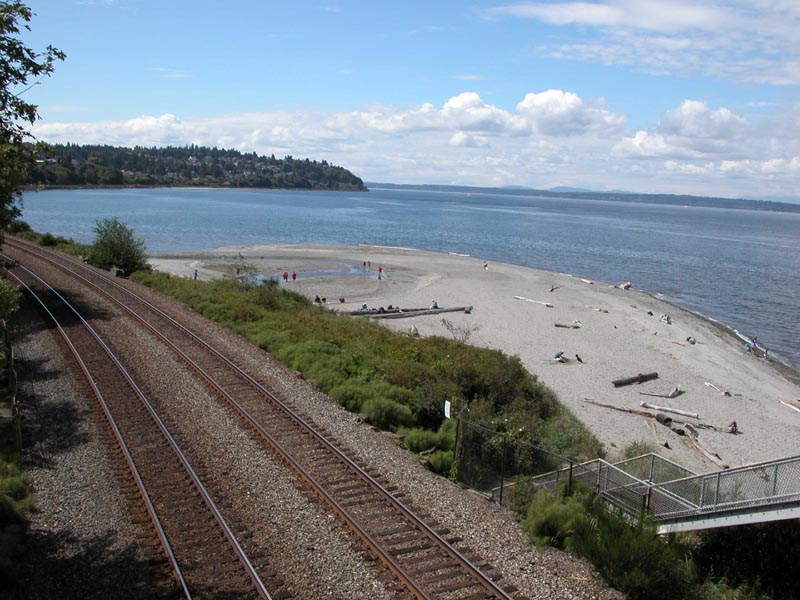
- Carkeek Park beach beyond the BNSF tracks. Esplanade NW in the distance
- Interactive map of Carkeek Park
- Type: Urban Park
- Location: Seattle, Washington
- Coordinates: 47°42′46″N 122°22′42″W
- Area: 216 acres (0.87 km^{2})
- Created: 1920s
- Operator: Seattle Parks and Recreation

Carkeek Park is a 216-acre park (87 ha) in the Broadview neighborhood of Seattle, Washington, United States. The park offers various attractions, including Piper Orchard, Pipers Creek with its tributaries, Venema Creek and Mohlendorph Creek, as well as picnic areas, shelters, and hiking trails.

Carkeek Park features diverse habitats—saltwater, riparian, wetland, upland forest, and meadow—that support a wide range of wildlife. Visitors can explore a six-mile trail network leading to a beach, playground, and a salmon imprinting pond, with scenic views of the Olympic Mountains and Puget Sound. The trails also pass by Demonstration Gardens and remnants of the park's original fir, hemlock, and cedar forests.

A pedestrian bridge over the BNSF Railway connects to the park's sand beach on Puget Sound. The Carkeek Park Environmental Learning Center hosts many of the park's educational programs.

== History ==
Seattle's first park to be called "Carkeek Park" was on Pontiac Bay, Lake Washington, near Sand Point. It was created with a financial gift to the city from Morgan J. Carkeek, a prominent builder and contractor. The park was condemned by the federal government in 1926 for the construction of Naval Station Puget Sound, which was later returned to the city and is now Magnuson Park. Carkeek offered $25,000 towards the creation of a new park, which the city accepted and themselves funded $100,000 to acquire land.

The new site, also called Carkeek Park, is situated on Puget Sound at the mouth of a creek known in Lushootseed as kʷaatəb, meaning "place where people are sent." Located in a steep canyon, its rugged terrain has protected the park from the urban expansion that has transformed much of Seattle. The property was owned by the family of city councilmember and baker A. W. Piper, who had established a homestead along Pipers Creek after losing his shop in the Great Seattle Fire in 1889.

Carkeek Park was formally dedicated on August 24, 1929, with 2,500 people in attendance for the ceremonies led by Vivian Carkeek, son of Morgan J. Carkeek. The park served a variety of purposes in the 20th century: it hosted outdoor performances, provided feed for zoo animals, and even briefly became an Army camp during World War II. In the 1930s, workers from the Civilian Conservation Corps built park structures, only to see them removed by 1938. Plans for an equestrian academy in the late 1940s were halted by budget shortfalls. Meanwhile, a sewage treatment plant that operated for years was eventually replaced by a Combined sewer overflow and pump station near the beach constructed by the Municipality of Metropolitan Seattle.

An additional 19 acres (7.7 ha) was acquired for the park in 1953 by the city government. Carkeek Park was re-dedicated on July 9, 1955, a year after the city annexed the park and the adjacent Broadview neighborhood. The park had been renovated with paved roads, new beach and picnic areas, and an archery range, and paved roads. A walkway over the railroad tracks to the beach was constructed in 1956. The archery range was relocated to Magnuson Park in 1985 after residents near Carkeek Park complained of stray arrows.

Carkeek Park's natural landscape has seen significant changes. Originally covered in old growth forest, it was clearcut by the early 20th century. Today, the park features a mature maple-alder forest in a successional stage, with evergreens like Western red cedar and Douglas fir slowly reclaiming their dominance. Wetlands host cattails and sedges, and huge lady ferns fill the ravine between 105th and 110th streets.

== Amenities ==
=== Piper's Orchard ===
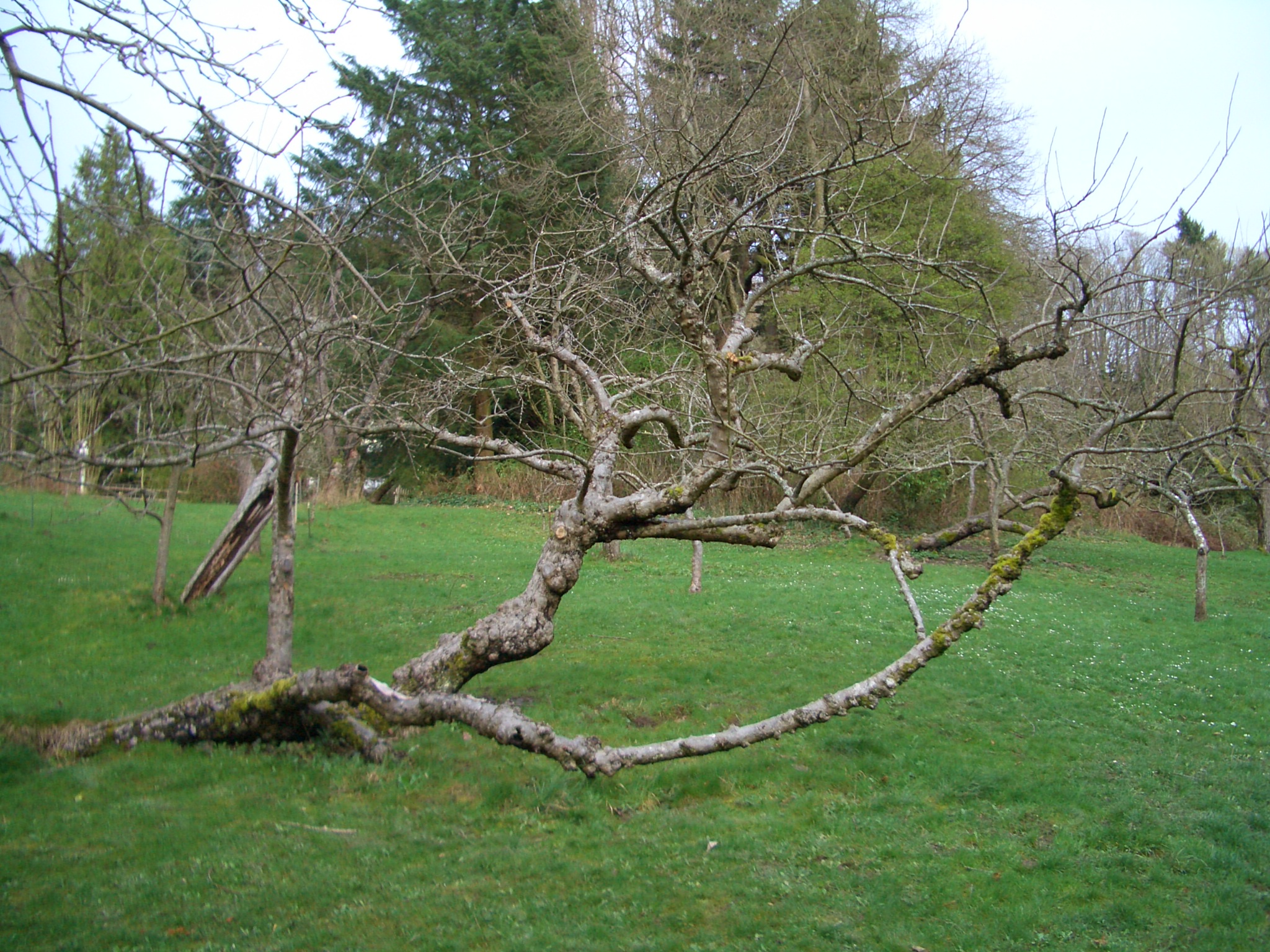
A century-old apple tree in Piper Orchard

Piper's Orchard, Seattle's oldest, was planted by settler A. W. Piper after the Great Seattle Fire of 1889. Neglected for decades, the orchard was rediscovered in 1981. Volunteers restored the trees and planted new ones, forming the Friends of Piper's Orchard to preserve and restore the property.

=== Playground ===
The Carkeek Park playground, designed to emulate the Pipers Creek watershed, features a 19-foot purple salmon slide, tiny caves, and a stream. These elements are intended to educate children about local nature and history. The project required $275,000 in funding and several years of planning and physical labor, culminating in its completion by local parents and neighbors. It officially opened in 1997.

=== Demonstration garden ===
Carkeek Park hosts the largest master gardener demonstration garden in King County. The garden covers an acre and features various themed beds connected by gravel paths, aiming to educate home gardeners on creating wildlife-friendly spaces using sustainable plants. It promotes local ecosystem health by avoiding harmful chemicals and offers educational workshops for gardening enthusiasts. The park includes accessible paths and picnic facilities, serving as a community resource for education and recreation.

=== Environmental Learning Center ===
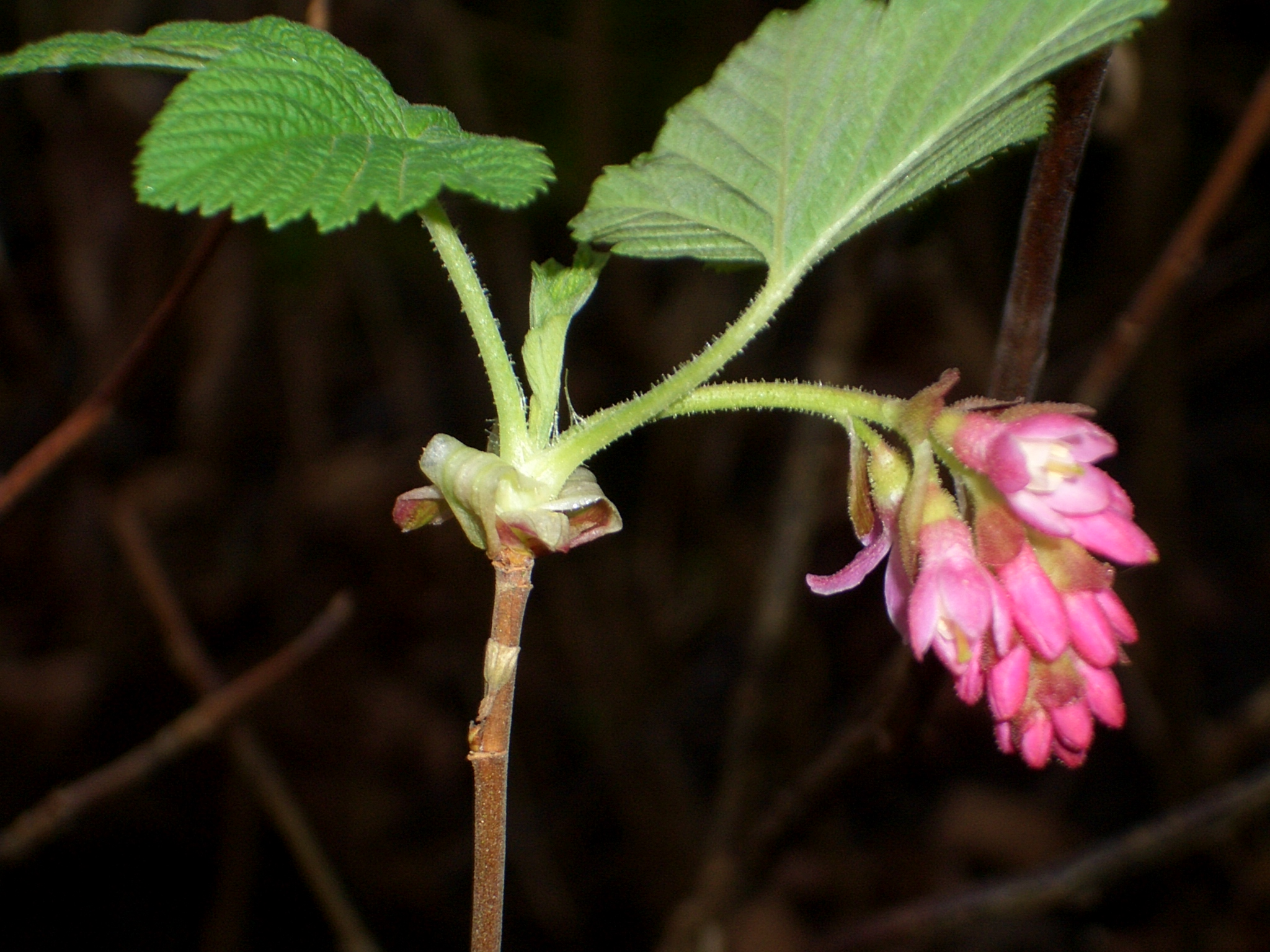
Wild Redflower Currant (Ribes sanguineum) blooming

The Carkeek Park Environmental Learning Center (ELC) was designed to demonstrate sustainable building practices aligned with U.S. Green Building Council standards. It was the first City of Seattle building to achieve LEED Gold Certification.

The center includes rooftop rainwater harvesting, energy-efficient insulation, and solar panels via Seattle City Light’s Green Power program. It also features salmon-friendly landscaping for stormwater management. Its construction utilized recycled and regional materials to reduce transportation-related energy use.

The ELC closed in 2013 due to city budget cuts and is no longer open to the public.

== Salmon habitat ==
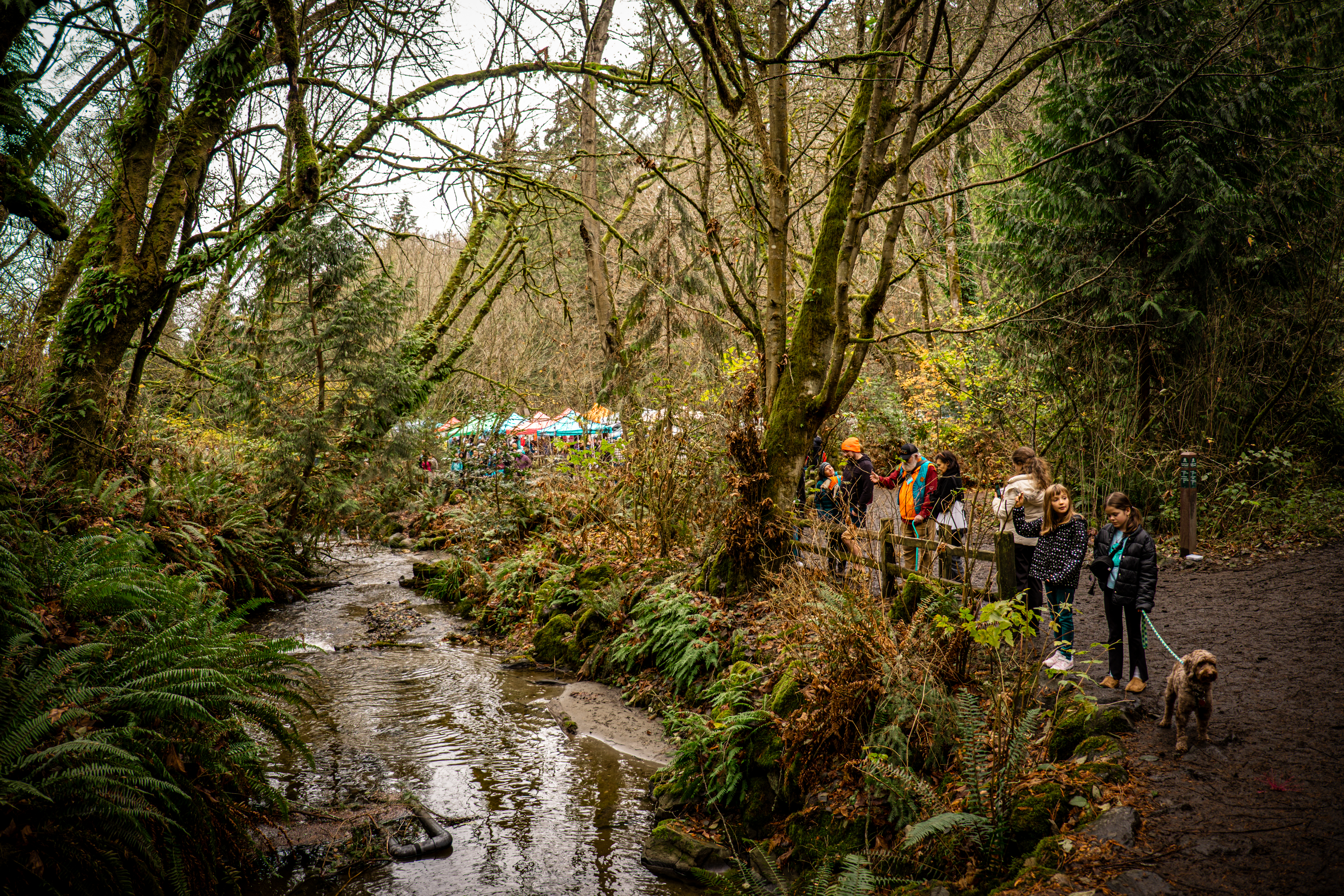
Crowds gather for the 2024 Salmon Celebration during a record-breaking spawning season

In 1987, chum salmon returned to Pipers Creek after a 50-year absence, following restoration efforts launched in 1979 by the Carkeek Watershed Community Action Project. The initiative, supported by the Suquamish Tribe, state agencies, Seattle Public Utilities, and Seattle Parks, focused on improved storm water management practices to revive the salmon run. Peak season to see returning salmon is November. In autumn 2023, beavers took up residence on the creek near its outlet into Puget Sound, building a dam, altering the environment, and complicating the maintenance of the salmon run.

On November 12, 2024, a total of 1,779 salmon were counted in Carkeek Park as part of the annual volunteer counting program for the autumn spawning run. It was a record amount for Pipers Creek, which had reached lows of 54 fish in 2019 and 190 in 2020.

== Bibliography ==
- "Carkeek Park". Seattle Parks and Recreation. August 8, 2006. Archived from the original on January 31, 2000.
  - This page has since been replaced by "Carkeek Park". Seattle Parks and Recreation.
- "Carkeek Park Environmental Learning Center". Seattle Parks and Recreation. August 8, 2006. Archived from the original on June 24, 2003.
- "Carkeek Park Environmental Learning Center: Summer 2006" (PDF). Carkeek Park. Seattle Parks and Recreation. June 30, 2006. Archived from the original on September 26, 2007.
- Sherwood, Don (June 20, 2003). "Carkeek Park" (PDF). PARK HISTORY: Sherwood History Files. Seattle Parks and Recreation. Archived from the original on July 11, 2007.
- "Sustainable Building & Development". Seattle Parks and Recreation. June 28, 2006. Archived from the original on June 11, 2003.
- "What is Environmental Stewardship?". Seattle Parks and Recreation. March 1, 2006. Archived from the original on November 23, 1999.
