= Greenwood, Seattle =

Coordinates: 47°41′26″N 122°21′19″W

Greenwood
- Seattle Neighborhood
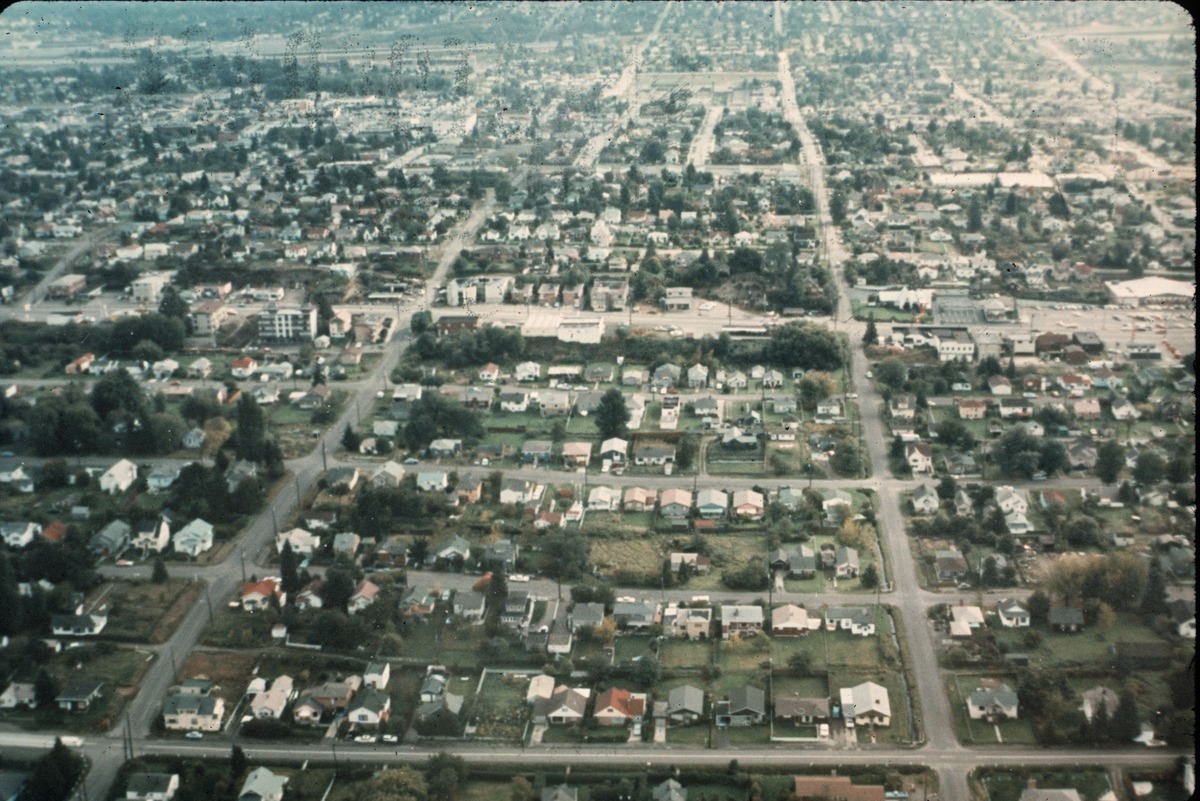
- Aerial view of Greenwood, 1969

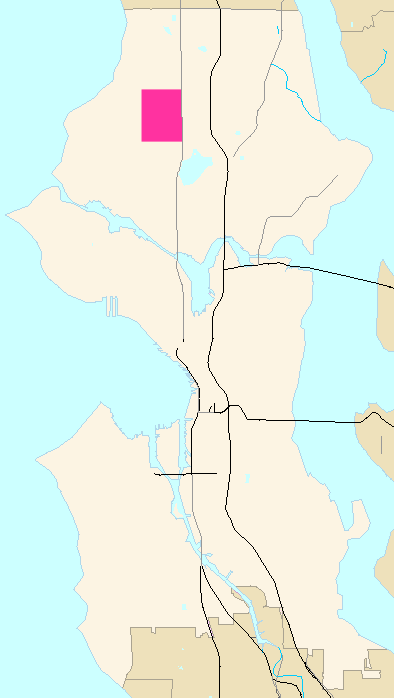
- Greenwood
- Country: United States
- State: Washington
- County: King
- City: Seattle
- Zip Code: 98103, 98117, 98133

Greenwood is a neighborhood in north central Seattle, Washington, United States. The intersection of Greenwood Avenue North and North 85th Street is the commercial center. Greenwood is known for its numerous bars, restaurants, coffee houses, theatres and specialty stores. Greenwood's main thoroughfares are Greenwood Avenue North and N. 85th streets.

Since 1993 the neighborhood has hosted the "Greenwood Car Show" on the last Saturday in June. Another annual event is the "Greenwood Seafair Parade", held on the fourth Wednesday in July. Both events draw tens of thousands of visitors to the neighborhood.

== Boundaries ==
The generally accepted boundaries are Aurora Avenue N (State Route 99) to the east, beyond which lies Licton Springs; N 105th Street/Holman Road to the north, beyond which lie Broadview and Bitter Lake; 8th Avenue NW to the west, beyond which lies Crown Hill, and N 75th Street to the south, beyond which lies Phinney Ridge. The division between Greenwood and Phinney Ridge is nebulous; the two neighborhoods plan events jointly.

== Schools and public services ==
Greenwood is served by the North Cluster of the Seattle Public Schools. No high school is located within the North Cluster but Nathan Hale, Roosevelt, Ballard, and Ingraham are all nearby. Schools in Greenwood include Greenwood Elementary and St. John Catholic School.

The neighborhood has had its own branch of the Seattle Public Library since 1928. The current Greenwood branch building was completed in 2005 and renovated in spring 2017. Recreation areas maintained by the City of Seattle include Alice Ball Park, Sandel Park and Greenwood Park. Greenwood has its own post office, which shares zip code 98103 with the larger Wallingford branch.

== Geological issues ==
The heart of Greenwood lies atop a peat deposit, also known as a bog. The area was molded into a bowl shape after the last glacial retreat, that was in turn, filled with runoff of dead plants that created the peat bog.

When groundwater is removed, the peat compresses, causing building settlement that cannot be undone. Commercial development has created an impervious surface and diverted rainwater to city sewers. On August 22, 2008, the city added peat bogs to the list of Environmentally Critical Areas. This is intended to encourage building techniques that would stabilize the ground water and reduce building settlement in the neighborhood.

Greenwood has areas where streets and sidewalks have also been damaged due to irregular settlement. In 2012 the city of Seattle rebuilt North 85th Street and repaved much of Greenwood Avenue North. Many sidewalks along these streets were also repaired, though evidence of prior damage can still be seen.

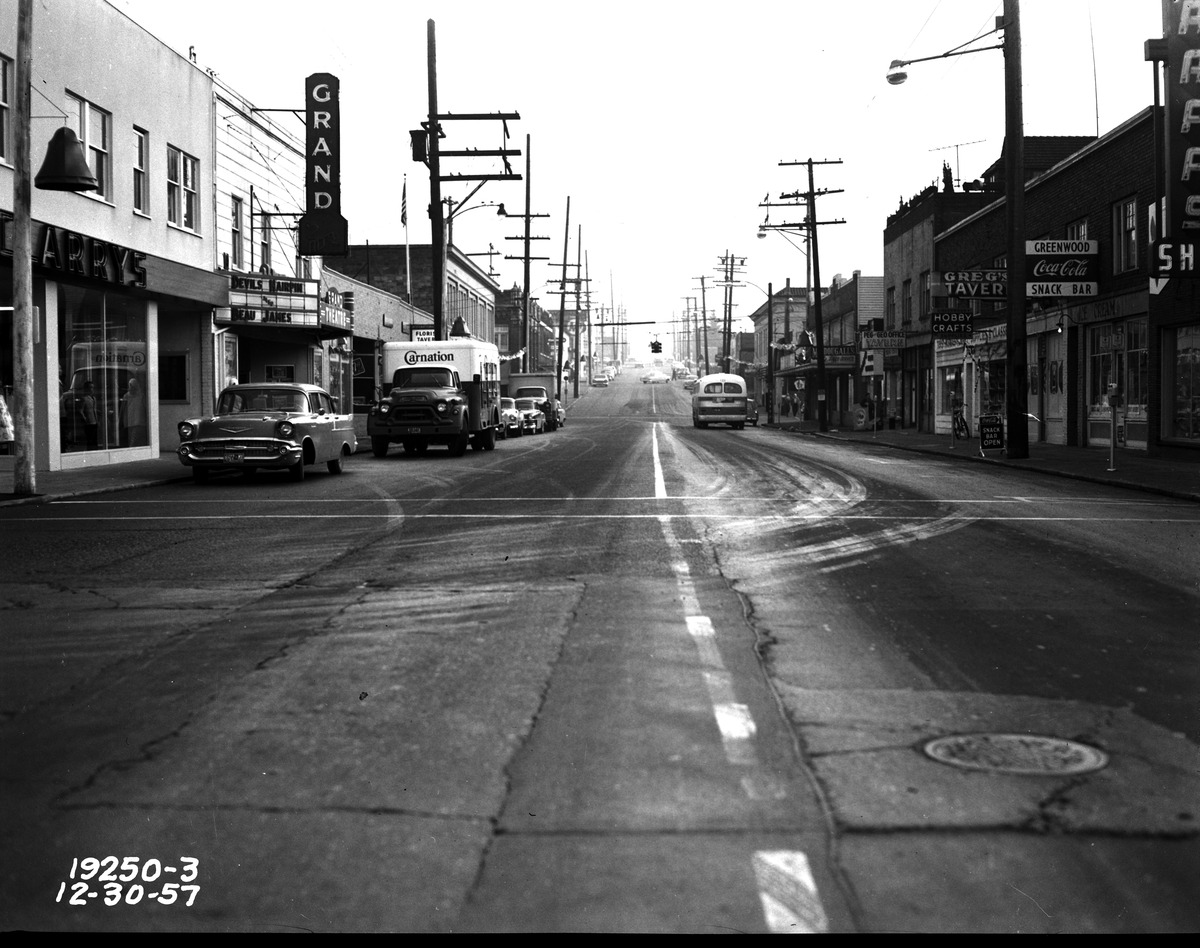
Looking east on 85th Street in the Greenwood neighborhood from Palatine in 1957. The Grand cinema is now (2013) the Taproot Theatre.

== History ==
Originally named Woodland, the neighborhood became Greenwood in 1907. Greenwood Avenue carried city streetcar and Seattle-Everett interurban passenger railroad traffic during the first half of the twentieth century.

The section of the neighborhood north of 85th Street was annexed to the city of Seattle in 1954. Residents of the area who voted for annexation expected that the city would build sidewalks. However, many residential streets north of 85th Street are still without sidewalks.

=== 2009 arson investigation ===
In 2009, the heart of Greenwood experienced several dramatic arson fires. On August 13, a house fire seriously injured a man and caused $170,000 damage. The largest fire, on October 23, burned a building to the ground on N 85th Street in the neighborhood center. Four businesses were destroyed: the Green Bean Coffee house; Phở Tic Tac; Szechuan Bistro; and C.C. Teriyaki. This fire also caused significant damage to a neighboring historic building housing the Taproot Theatre Company. A $10,000 reward was offered.

Two fires occurred on November 5 and three more on November 9. The most severe of these caused $20,000 worth of damage and forced the closure of the Olive You restaurant. On November 13, Seattle police arrested a 46-year-old homeless man who frequented the neighborhood. The suspect had been spotted at the scene of three previous fires. He initially pleaded innocent to 12 charges, but changed his plea to guilty and was sentenced to 30 years in prison.

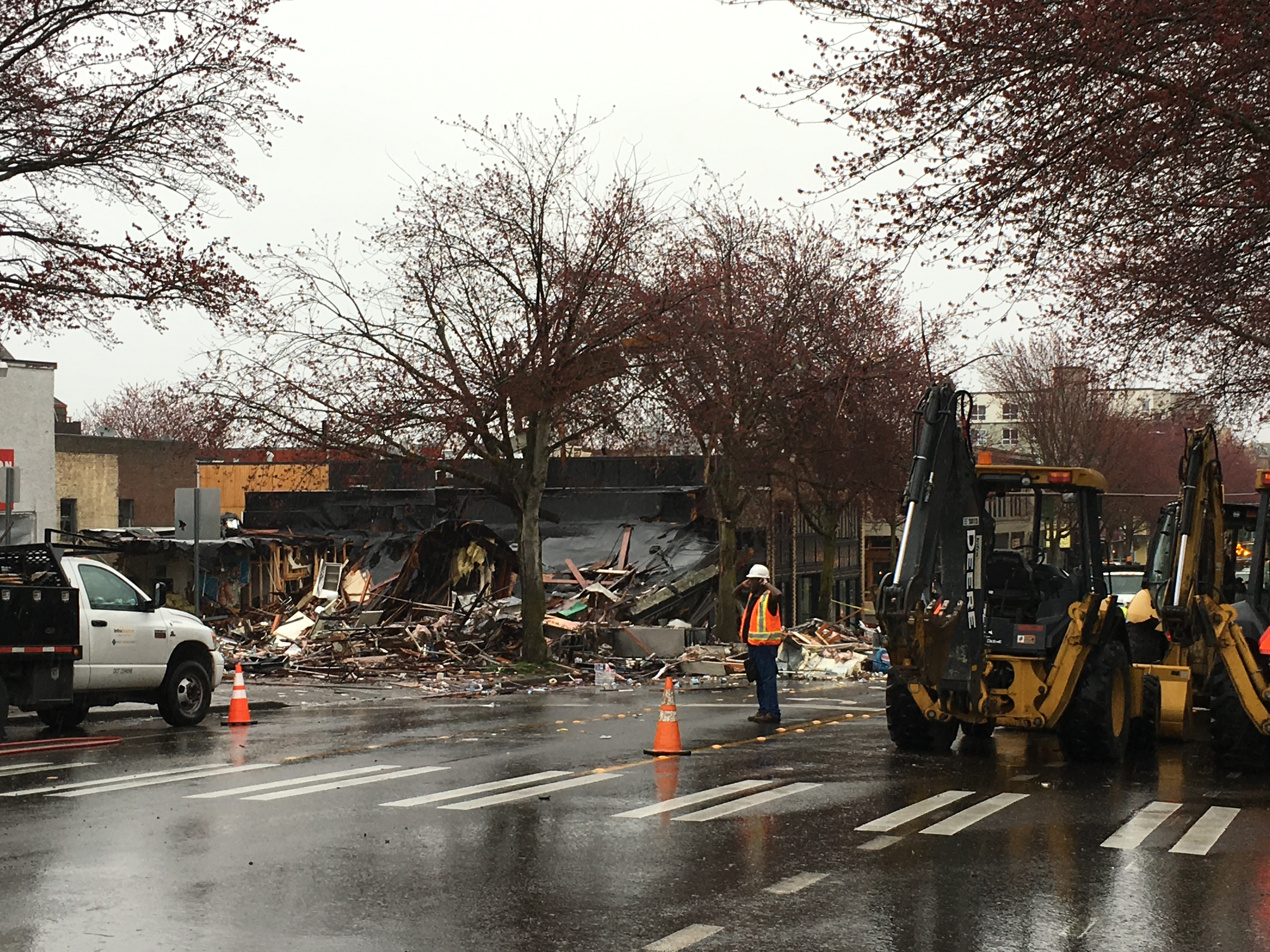
Aftermath of the 2016 explosion, looking to the northwest on Greenwood Avenue North, at the corner of N 84th Street.

=== 2016 explosion ===
Early on the morning of Wednesday, March 9, 2016, a natural gas leak caused a massive explosion, destroying three small buildings on Greenwood Avenue just south of North 85th Street and injuring several firefighters. The businesses lost were Neptune Coffee (8415), Mr. Gyros (restaurant) (8411), and a Quick Stop convenience store (8409). The damage was estimated at $3 million; many other buildings in the area also had broken windows and other damage.

== Notable people ==
- Kent Kammerer, educator and activist
- Michael McGinn, Former Mayor of Seattle (2010 - 2013)
