= Aurora Commons =

Charity in Seattle, Washington

- Named after: Aurora Avenue
- Formation: 2011; 15 years ago
- Location: 8914 Aurora Avenue North, Seattle
- Coordinates: 47.6939°N 122.3442°W
- Region served: Licton Springs, North Seattle
- Services: Homeless drop-in center
- Affiliations: Christian Reformed Church in North America
- Website: auroracommons.org

Aurora Commons is a drop-in center for homeless people in Seattle. It was co-founded in 2011 by Lisa Etter Carlson. It has been described as "a small oasis in the heart of Seattle's forgotten desert", Aurora Avenue North – an area of the city where sex workers and homeless frequently find patrons, heroin and cheap motels; and which had no supermarket, bank, community center, nor bookstore, and no Seattle City Council representation until 2015. The space is affiliated with the Christian Reformed Church across the street. Local businesses have protested the center's needle exchange program. Aurora Commons also provides condoms and other services for sex workers.
