= Pilling's Pond =

Waterfowl reserve in Seattle, Washington

Coordinates: 47°41′40″N 122°20′17″W

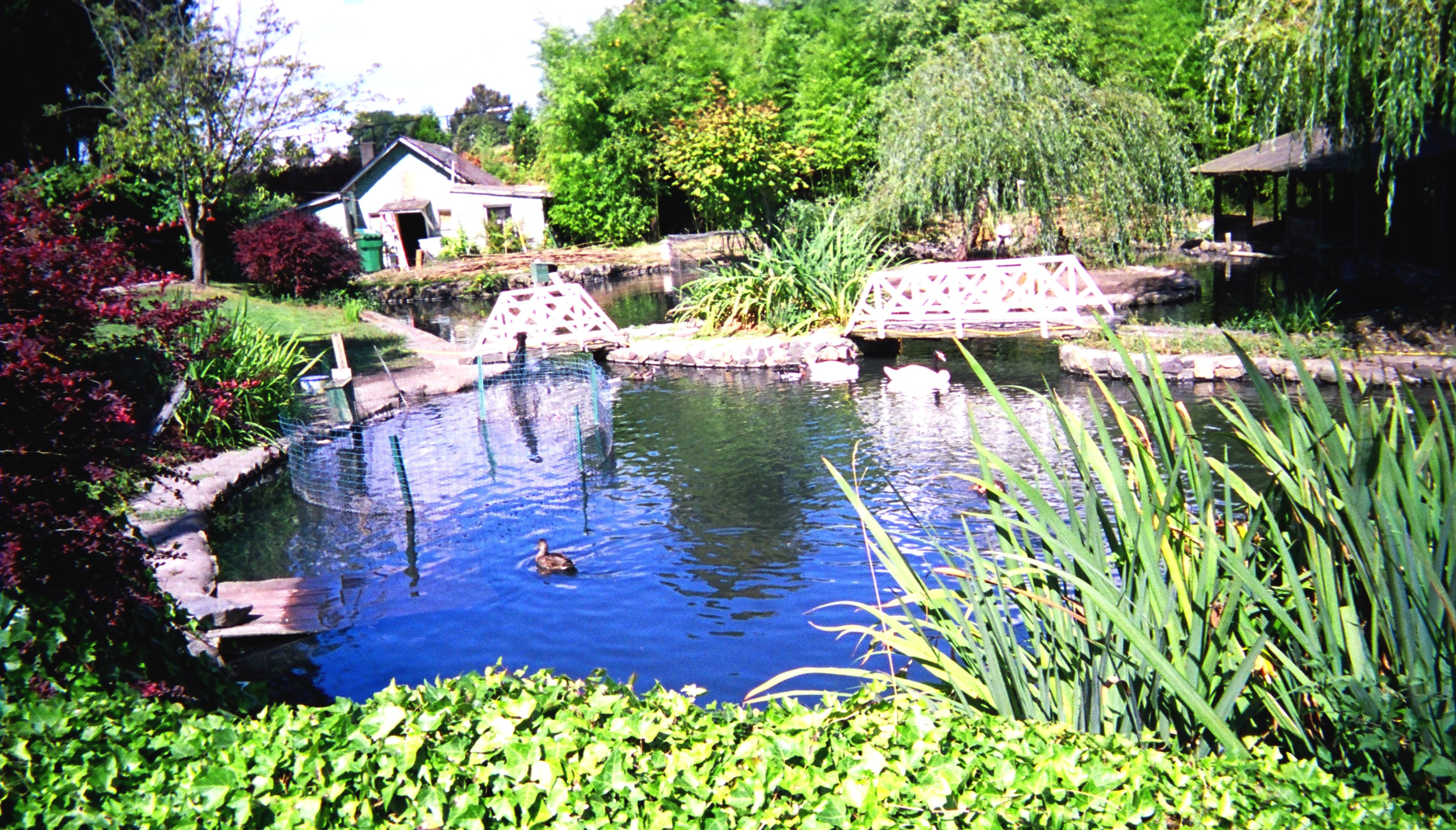
Pilling's Pond

Pilling's Pond is a privately owned urban waterfowl reserve and breeding ground in the North Seattle neighborhood of Licton Springs, Seattle, Washington. It was created by lifetime resident Charles A. Pilling and has been a bird breeding site and a roadside attraction since the 1920s.

== History ==
In the 1880s, a member of the Denny family built a house on North 90th Street and Densmore Avenue North in Seattle. James and Marietta Pilling purchased the property in 1909, and converted it to a dairy farm. In 1924, their twelve-year-old son Charles A. Pilling (October 6, 1911 – October 24, 2001) dug a small pond to care for three injured mallard ducks he had been given. This began Pilling's lifelong interest in breeding waterfowl. Over the years, the size of the pond was expanded to 100 by 50 feet (30 m × 15 m) on the half-acre lot. It was fed fresh water by diverting Licton Springs. It is bordered by bamboo stands, and yet with a viewing area on North 90th Street, it still remains part of Seattle's urban landscape. In the 1950s Pilling created a manually operated flood control system that was still in use in 2011.

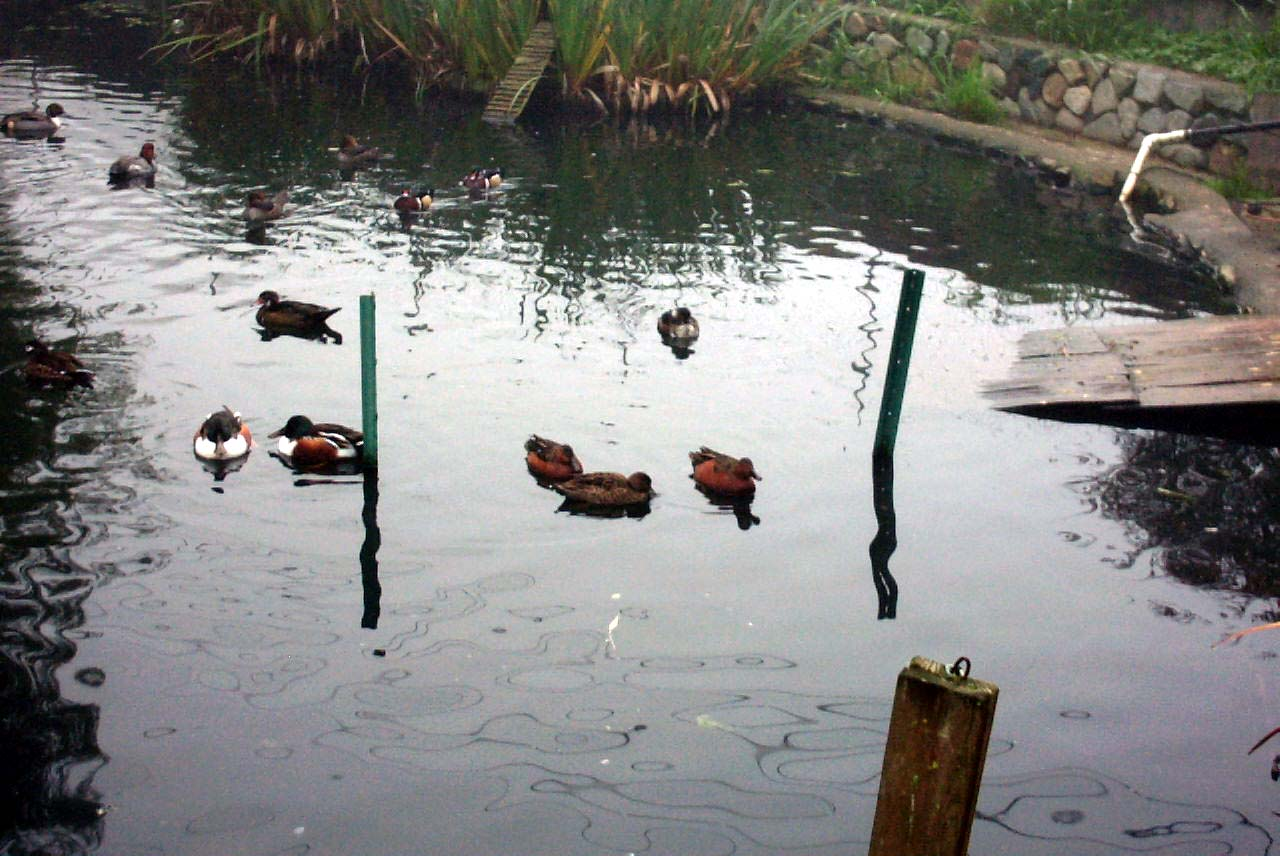
Shovelers and cinnamon teals on the pond

Pilling gained international fame when in 1955 the International Wild Waterfowl Association (IWWA) recognized him as the first to breed the hooded merganser in captivity. He received the female merganser as an injured duck, nursed her to health and then found a male partner for her. This was followed by similar awards in 1964 for the bufflehead and in 1977 for being first to breed the harlequin duck. He received the Grand Master Breeder Award from the American Game Bird Breeders Cooperative Federation. Charles Pilling's most prestigious award was induction into the IWWA's Hall of Fame. "In 1990, he was the fourth person ever to be inducted into IWWA's Waterfowl Breeders Hall of Fame, an award that he and his wife, June, traveled to Nova Scotia to accept." All of these achievements occurred while managing the activity on Pilling's Pond.

As Pilling became well known in the bird breeding community, he was sought out as a mentor. In 1972, Paul Dye moved to Seattle for the purpose of learning the art and craft of bird breeding from the master. Pilling mentored Dye, and Dye went on to establish his own duck reserve near Lake Stevens, Washington, known as Northwest Waterfowl Farm.

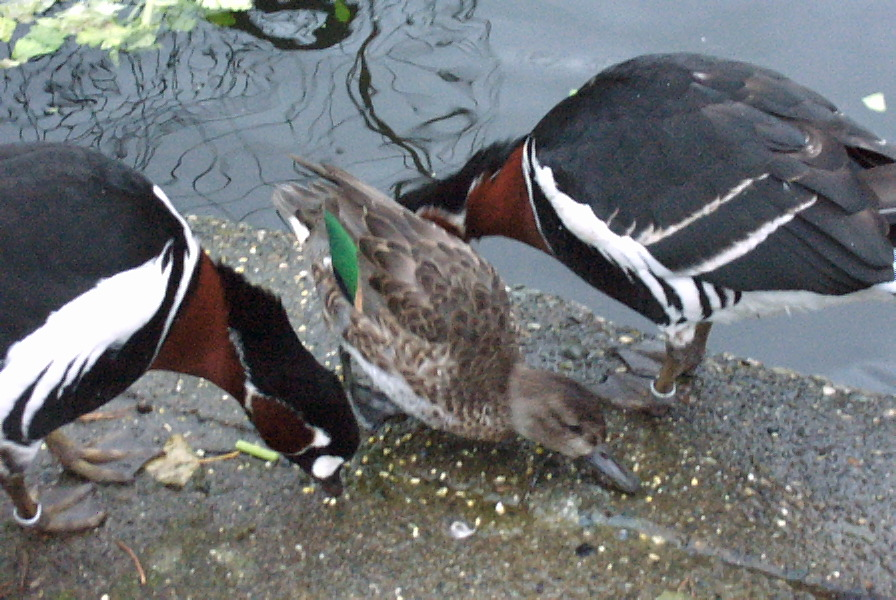
Siberian geese and a fledgling green-winged teal

In May 2001, Seattle Community Access Network (SCAN) produced a documentary video about Pilling's Pond. It shows green-winged teals, blue-winged teals, wood ducks, mandarins, hooded mergansers, red heads, goldeneye, buffleheads, ring-necks, and northern shovelers, as well as some exotic Siberian geese, black-necked swans and Australian black swans. The pond has been home to over 100 waterfowl in its peak Autumn season. Interviews with Pilling, biologists Peter Lortz and Ellie Cauldwell, and other local pond experts, are also presented in the documentary.

In October 2001, Chuck Pilling died at 90 years of age. In 2005, David Kunkle, a long-time neighbor, purchased the property with the intention of preserving the pond's legacy. Since then, family members and neighbors, organized under the non-profit corporation, Pilling's Pond Preservation Society, have maintained the pond and have continued to preserve it as an educational resource, with the support of Puget Consumers Coop, who for over a decade has donated lettuce trimmings as a healthy staple diet for the birds.

Pilling's Pond as a non-commercial enterprise continues as a historical and educational resource for the Licton Springs neighborhood.
