= Northacres Park =

Park in Seattle, Washington, United States

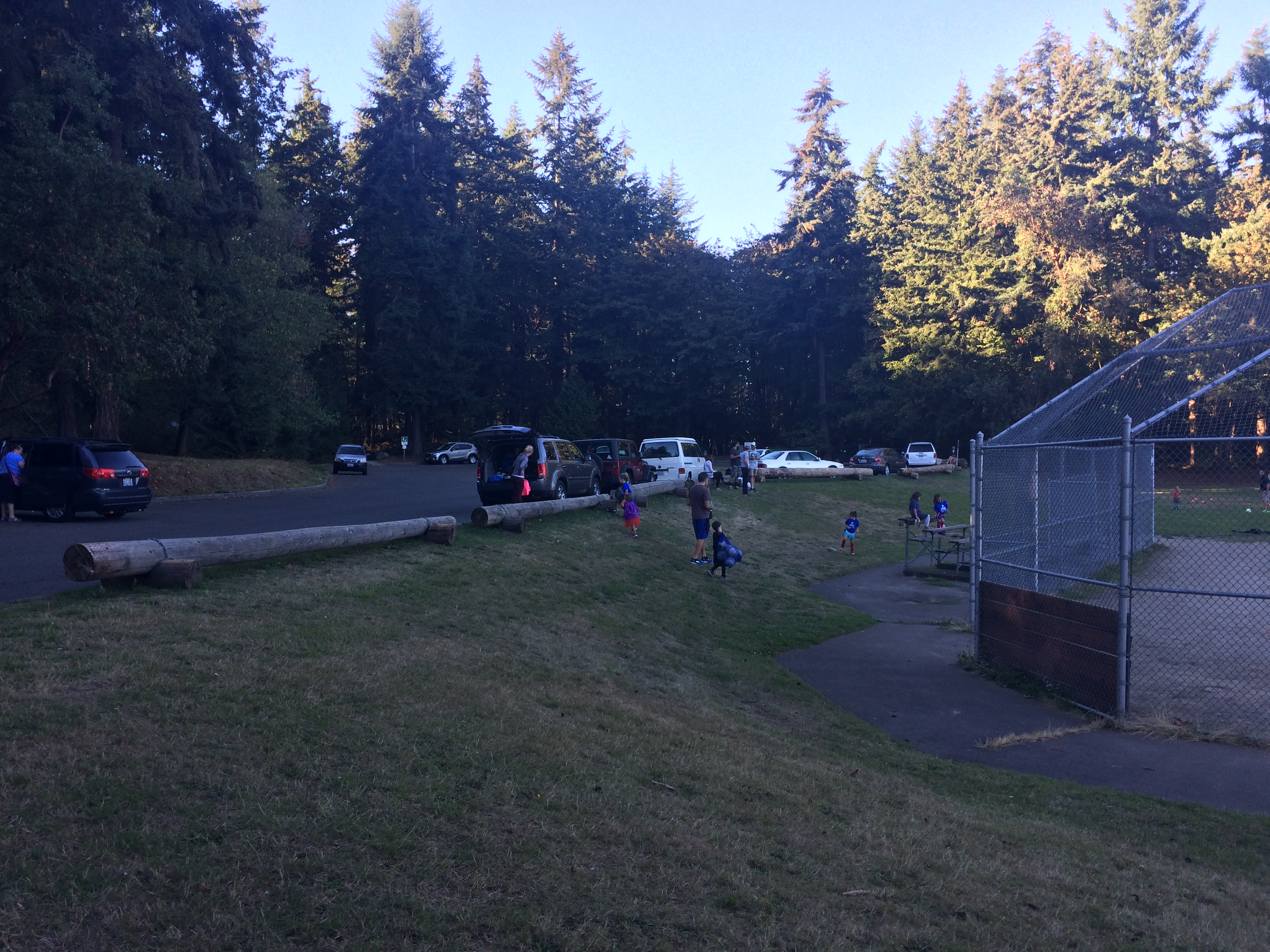
- Parking and play fields at Northacres Park
- Interactive map of Northacres Park
- Type: Urban Park
- Location: Seattle, Washington
- Coordinates: 47°43′19.9″N 122°19′35.2″W
- Area: 20.7 acres (84,000 m^{2})
- Operator: Seattle Parks and Recreation

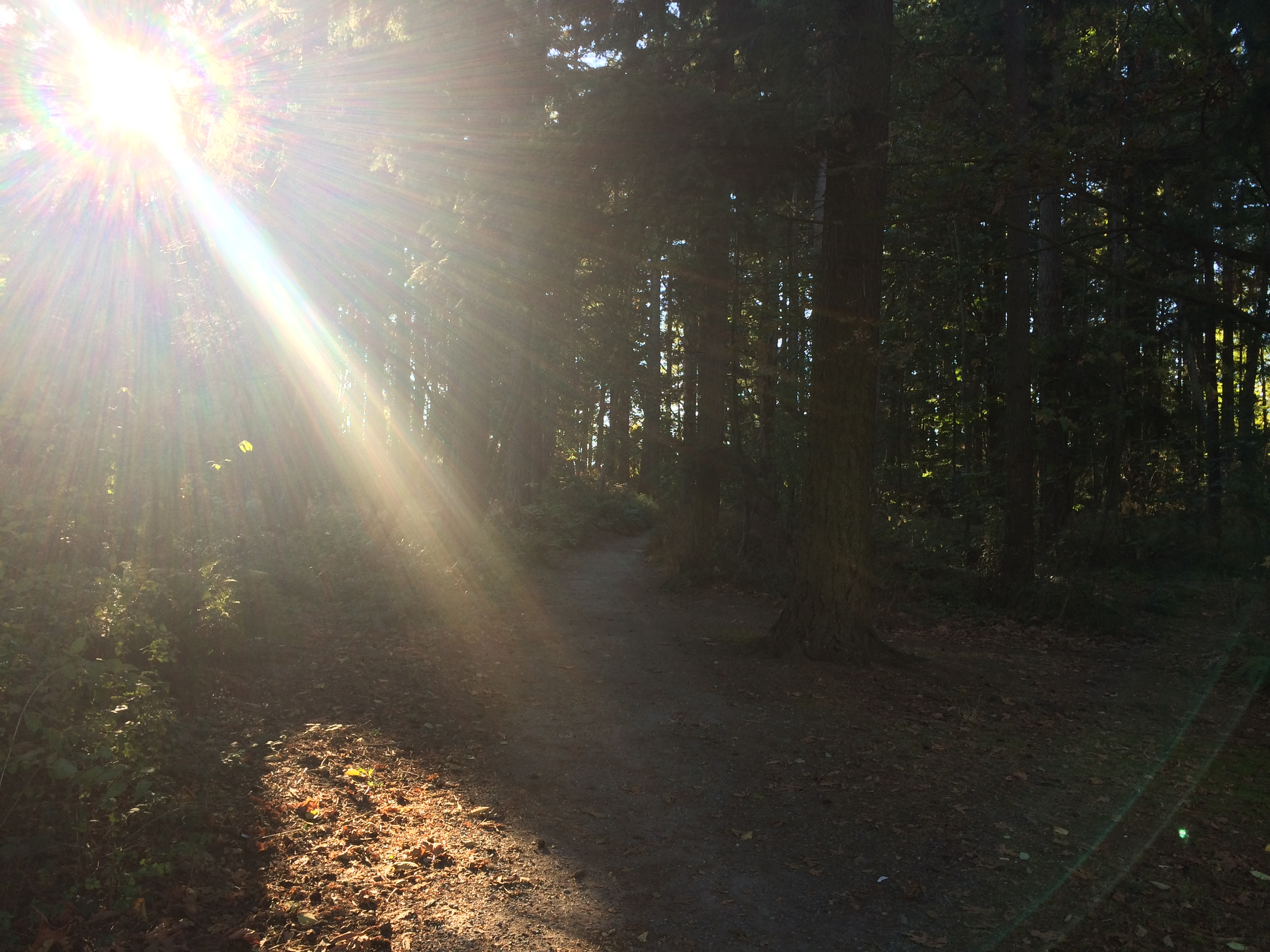
Trail through a wooded area of Northacres Park

Northacres Park is a 20.7-acre (84,000 m^{2}) public park located in the Haller Lake neighborhood of Seattle, Washington, at the corner of Interstate 5 and N.E. 130th Street. It incorporates a large forested area with trails, a picnic area, a baseball diamond and soccer field, and an off-leash dog area. The park's playground and wading pool were remodeled and reopened in 2012. They include two play areas with equipment for children of different ages as well as a Splash pad.

The park was also the site of one of two only remaining Civil Defense towers in the city until 2025 when it was finally removed, erected in 1954 to support a Chrysler Air-Raid Siren. The siren, listed by Guinness World Records as the loudest ever constructed, is no longer operational.
