= Shilshole people =

Indigenous people in Washington state

Shilshole
šilšulabš
- The home of Salmon Bay Charlie, the last resident of the Shilshole village before its eventual destruction (c. 1905)

Regions with significant populations
- Salmon Bay, Washington (state)

Languages
- Lushootseed

Religion
- Indigenous folk religion

Related ethnic groups
- Lushootseed-speaking peoples, esp. the Duwamish and Suquamish

The Shilshole people (Lushootseed: šilšulabš; also known as the Shilshoolabsh) were a Lushootseed-speaking people whose territory was located around Salmon Bay near Seattle, Washington. Around the 19th century, they had just one village deep inside Salmon Bay. The last Shilshole were removed from their homes in 1914, and moved to the Port Madison Reservation to enable the construction of the Ballard Locks, although some assimilated into the nearby community of Ballard.

Their name is derived from the Lushootseed word for Salmon Bay, šilšul, which means "threading a needle", in reference to the narrow passage through which Salmon Bay empties into Shilshole Bay. Their Lushootseed endonym is šilšulabš, which means "people of šilšul" or "needle-threading people".

== History ==
Throughout the 19th century, the Shilsholes were subjected to extensive slave raiding from tribes coming from the far north. Shilshole elders remembered raids from the Stikine Tlingit, who raided Salmon Bay, capturing or killing anyone they saw. The Haida were another people who were remembered to have raided Salmon Bay. This raiding was likely the reason for their village's location deep inside Salmon Bay, rather than being directly on Puget Sound. They also used the nearby Bitter Lake (Lushootseed: č̓alq̓ʷadiʔ) and Haller Lake (Lushootseed: sisaɬtəb) as places of refuge during these raids. They hunted and gathered in the area as well; their usage of the area being proven by artifacts discovered at Haller Lake.

In 1862, at the time of the arrival of the first white settlers in Salmon Bay, there were just twelve Shilshole families remaining. They were led by a headman, Shilshole Curly (also called Salmon Bay Curley). They had one village, šilšul, located on the north end of Salmon Bay in what is now Ballard. It had two large longhouses, each 60 by 120 feet (18 m × 37 m), and an "even larger" potlatch house used for ceremonies.

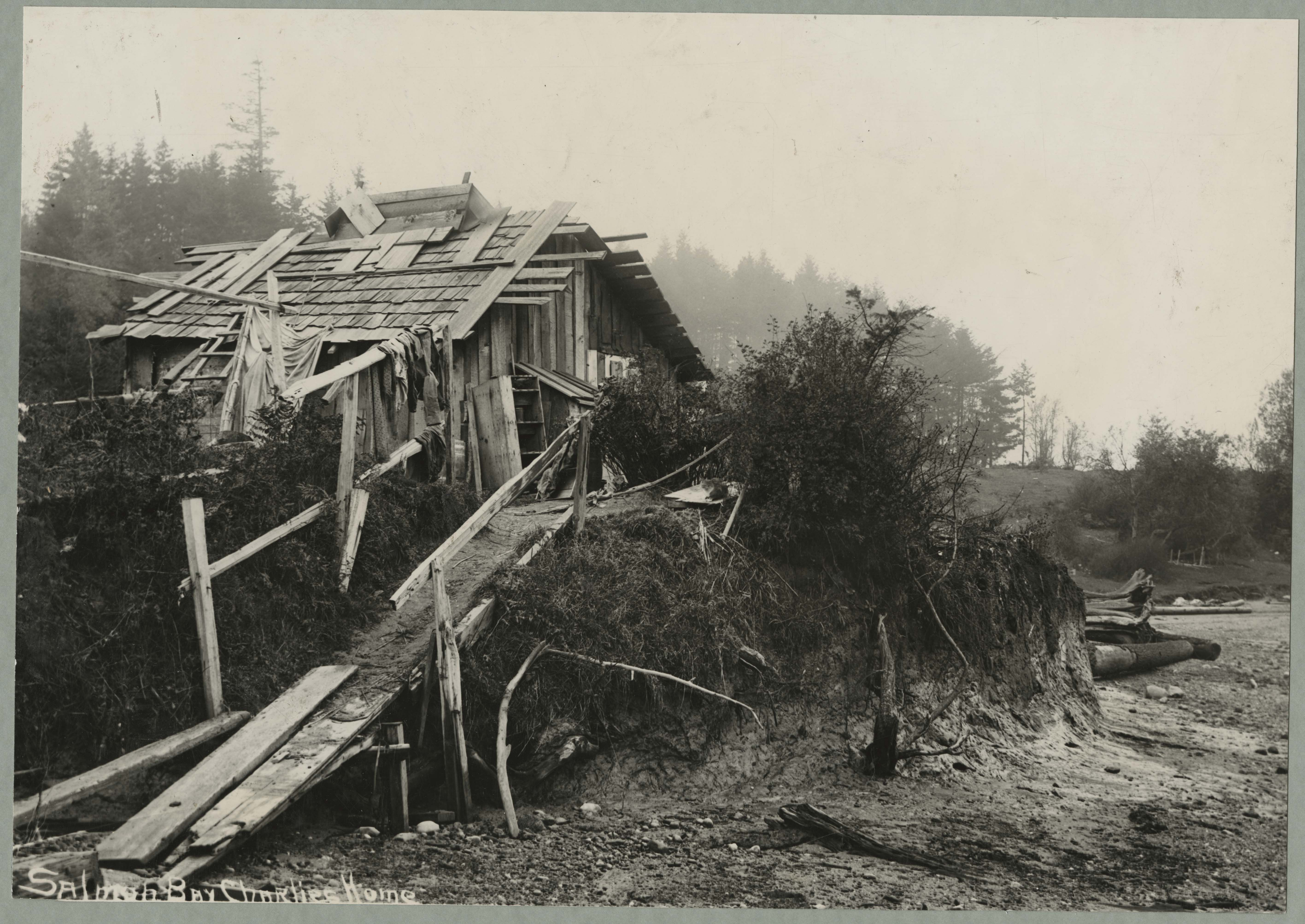
Salmon Bay Charlie's house (c. 1900)

By 1890, settlers had cleared all the land around the village up to what is now 65th Street in Ballard, forcing the Shilshole to travel farther for food and wood. Despite American settlement in the area, the Shilshole lived in the village until the early 20th century alongside the growing American settlement of Ballard, when, in 1914, the remnants of the village were destroyed for the construction of the Ballard Locks. The 20 remaining Shilshole people slowly assimilated into the nearby community of Ballard or moved to nearby reservations, with the last remaining being Salmon Bay Charlie.

In the 1920s, an archaeological excavation of the western portion of the Shilshole village was conducted by one A. G. Colley. The excavation revealed many tools used by the Shilshole, including those made of antler, stone, bone, and iron.

They are today seen as one of the subgroups (or "bands") of the modern day Duwamish people, however, they were historically independent and autonomous from the Duwamish. Despite living on a saltwater estuary, they were one of the x̌ačuʔabš, the Lake Peoples, a traditional ethnic identity of the Lushootseed-speaking world, whose villages were primarily located around the freshwater lakes Washington and Union. This is due to their connection to the other Lake Peoples and their reliance on the resources of Lake Washington and Lake Union.

== Salmon Bay Charlie ==
Salmon Bay Charlie (also called Hwelchteed, Indian Charley, or Shilshole Charlie) was the last Shilshole living in the Ballard area. He was half-Samish and half-Shilshole and portrayed himself as the hereditary leader of the Shilshole. He and his wife Cheethluleetsa (also known as Madeline) would harvest clams, salmon, and berries, and sell them in the markets of the growing settlement of Ballard nearby. They resisted being removed to the reservations until c. 1914, when they were living at the mouth of Salmon Bay on ten acres (4.0 ha) and in a small cabin. After the death of Madeline c. 1914, he was eventually forced to leave his home for the construction of the locks and removed to the Port Madison Reservation.

== See also ==
- Duwamish people
- Suquamish
- List of Lushootseed-speaking peoples

== Bibliography ==
- Buerge, David (August 1984). "Indian Lake Washington" (PDF). Seattle Weekly.
- Hilbert, Vi; Miller, Jay; Zahir, Zalmai (2001). sdaʔdaʔ gʷəɬ dibəɬ ləšucid ʔacaciɬtalbixʷ – Puget Sound Geography. Original Manuscript from T.T. Waterman. Seattle: Lushootseed Press. ISBN 979-8750945764.
- Pheasant-Albright, Julie D. (2007-11-21). Early Ballard. Arcadia Publishing. ISBN 978-0738548173. LCCN 2007930839.
- Thrush, Coll (2007), Native Seattle: Histories from the Crossing-Over Place, Weyerhaeuser Environmental Books (2nd ed.), Seattle: University of Washington Press, ISBN 9780295741345, JSTOR j.ctvcwnvq3
