= Licton Springs, Seattle =

- Seattle Neighborhood
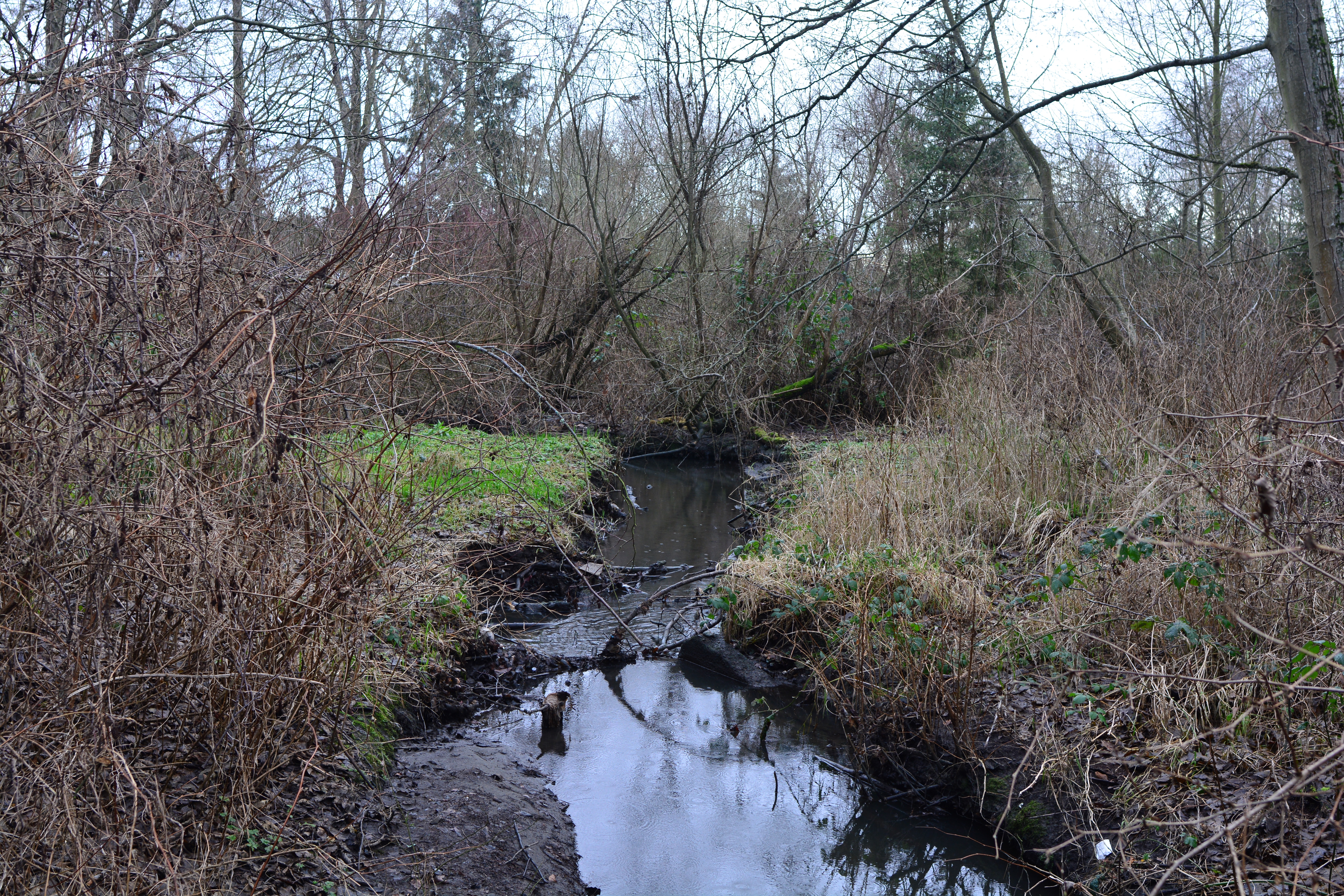
- Licton Springs Park

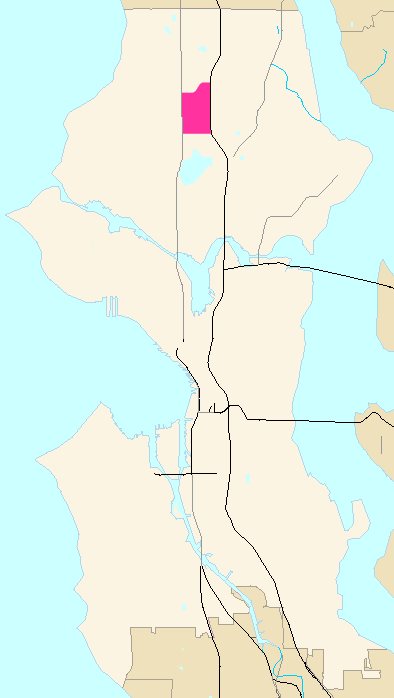
- Licton Springs Highlighted in Pink
- Coordinates: 47°41′55″N 122°20′19″W
- Country: United States
- State: Washington
- County: King
- City: Seattle
- Time zone: UTC−8 (PST)
  - Summer (DST): UTC−7 (PDT)
- ZIP Code: 98103
- Area code: 206, 564

Licton Springs or North College Park is a neighborhood in the informal Northgate district of North Seattle. It is bounded by Interstate 5 to the east, beyond which is Maple Leaf neighborhood and the Northgate Mall; Aurora Avenue N (SR 99) to the west, beyond which is Greenwood; N 85th Street to the south, beyond which is Green Lake, and N Northgate Way to the north, beyond which is Haller Lake.

== Licton Springs ==
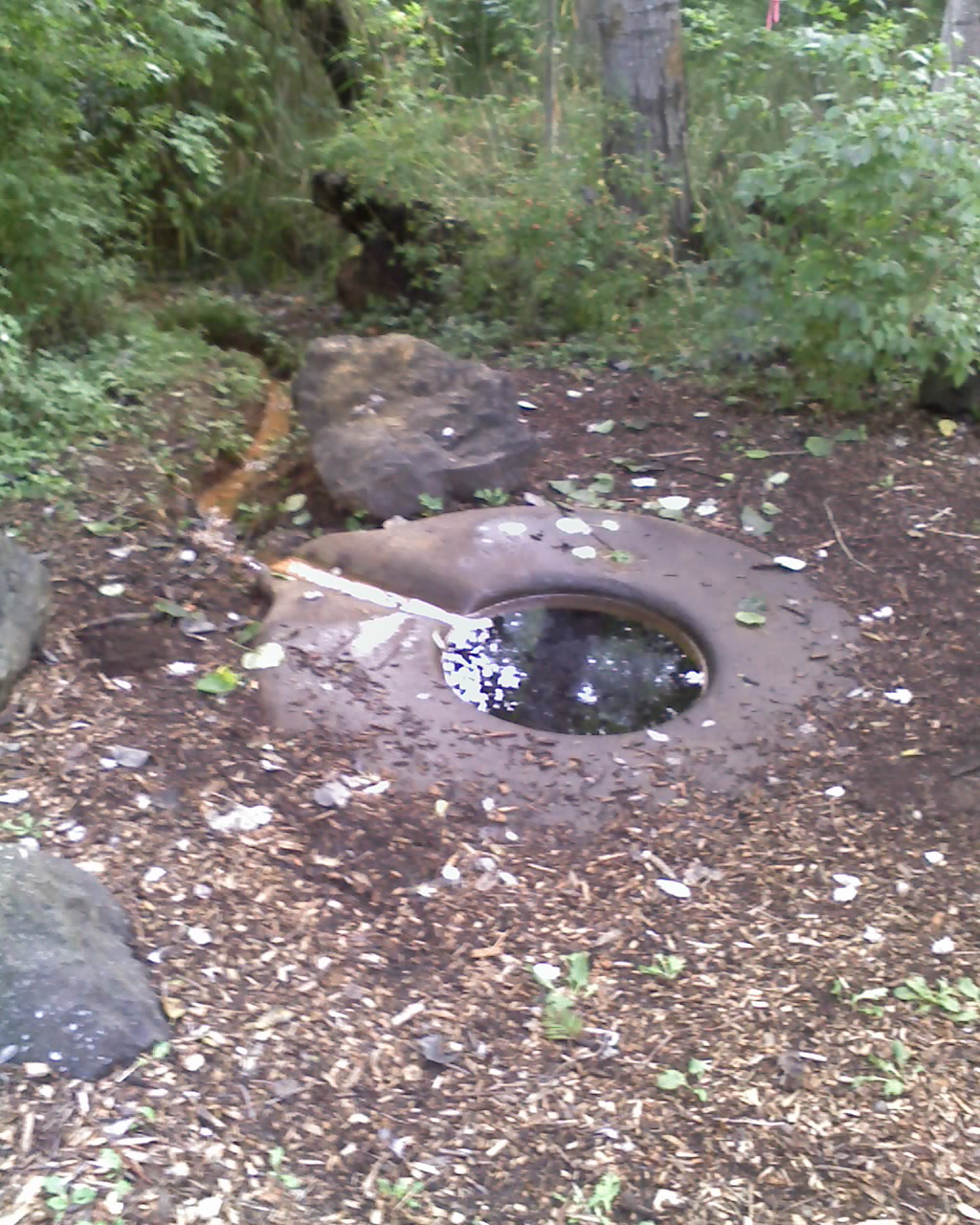
Licton Springs, the natural iron spring

Licton Springs is both a residential neighborhood and a natural spring at the north end of Licton Springs Park, which has a long history as both a unique recreational spot and a commercial crossroads. The neighborhood, wedged between the busy corridors of Interstate 5 and Aurora Avenue, takes its name from líq’tәd (LEEK-tuhd) or Licton, the Lushootseed (Whulshootseed) Coast Salish word for the reddish mud of the springs—. The dxʷdəwʔabš, People of the Inside and x̌ačuʔabš, People of the Large Lake, Lushootseed (Skagit-Nisqually) Coast Salish native people had used the springs area as a spiritual health spa since the area was populated after the last glacial period (c. 8,000 BCE—10,000 years ago). In the 1850s, the dxʷdəwʔabš and x̌ačuʔabš became the Duwamish tribe of today.

In October 2019, the spring and the park that surrounds it were designated a city landmark, the first Native cultural site to be so designated.

== Settlement ==
Seattle pioneer David Denny built a summer cabin near the springs around 1870. The natural spring fed Green Lake before it was capped and drained to the Metro sewer system after it became contaminated by residential development (1920, 1931). The Olmsted Brothers designed a park for Licton Springs, as part of a grand streets and parks plan for Seattle (1930s), but this park was never implemented. A park does exist today (where Woodlawn Avenue curves to connect with N 95th Street) in which the spring is located. In the mid-1960s restoration began with bond issues and increasing volunteer assistance, resulting in a small pond and natural wetland vegetation as well as urban park amenities. A Native American presence continues in the neighborhood through the Indian Heritage School at Wilson-Pacific. This school hosts frequent Indian Pow Wows and spectacular wall murals by Indian artist Andrew Morrison.

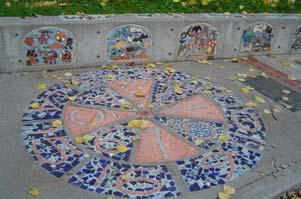
Mosaic tile at Licton Springs Park, Seattle, Washington

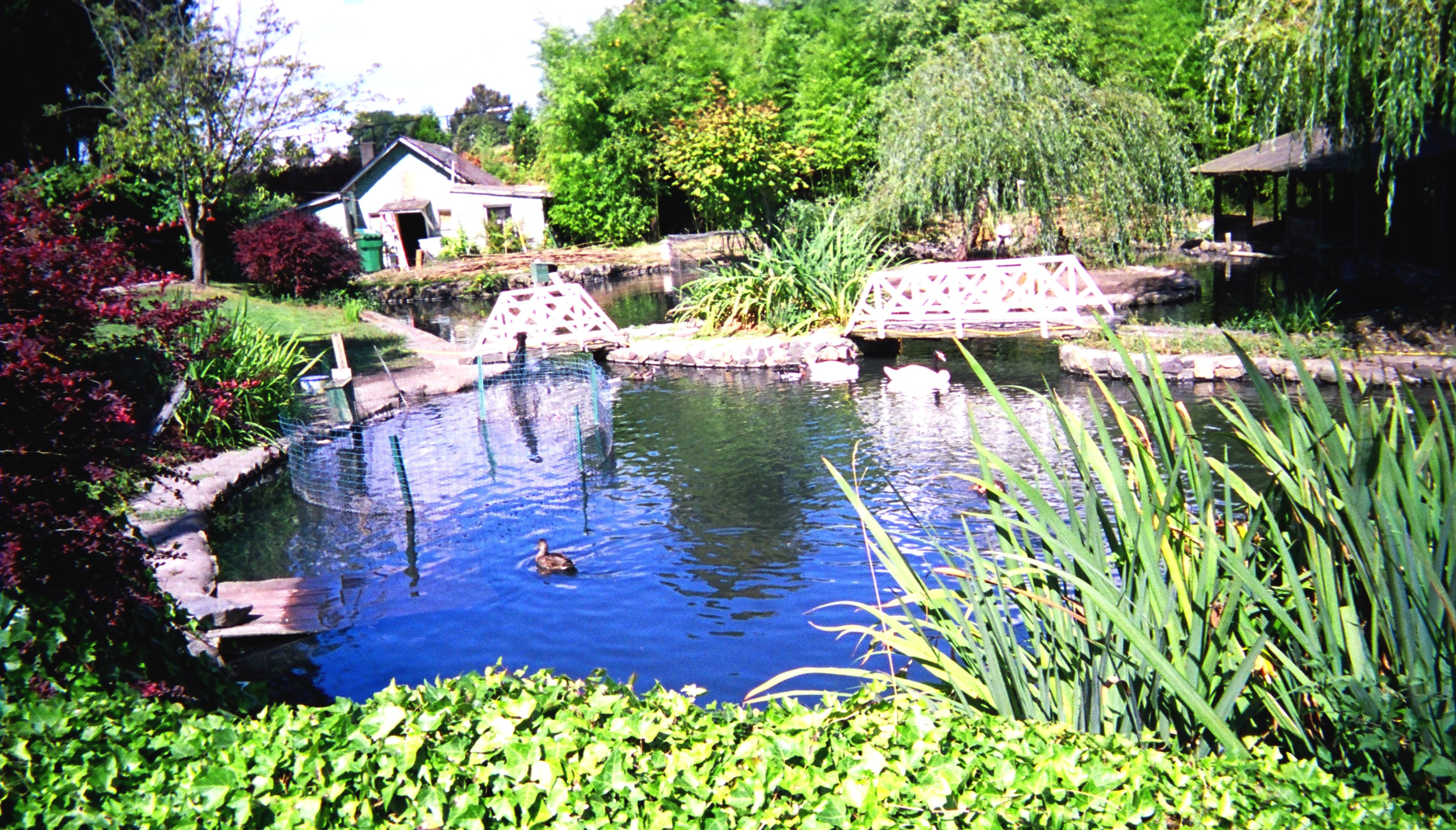
Exotic waterfowl habitat at Pillings Pond

The Everett and Interurban Railway Company (1900–1936) came past the neighborhood in 1906. The trolleys became a part of everyday life and development of residential neighborhoods around trolley stops. Running on a narrow right-of-way through backyards, the whistle became part of the atmosphere of neighborhoods like Licton Springs. In the early years, the line ran through cut forest and rural farms. A few sawmills along the way gave the line a business hauling lumber. The rough wagon road became Aurora Avenue N (1930) after being paved with brick (1913) and asphalt (1928). A most distinctive early feature was the motorist "tourist camps", "auto camps", and later, "auto courts", then the now-familiar motels. One or two still remained at the turn of the 21st century.

The Pilling family had a dairy farm (1909–1933), out of which grew the waterfowl habitat and birding site of Pilling's Pond today. Japanese-Americans had greenhouses and small farms until they were abruptly forcibly removed with the Internment of Japanese Americans (1942–1945).

== North College Park ==
Seattle annexed most of North Seattle in 1954. North College Park became defined with the Licton Springs neighborhood with the establishment of North Seattle College (1970).

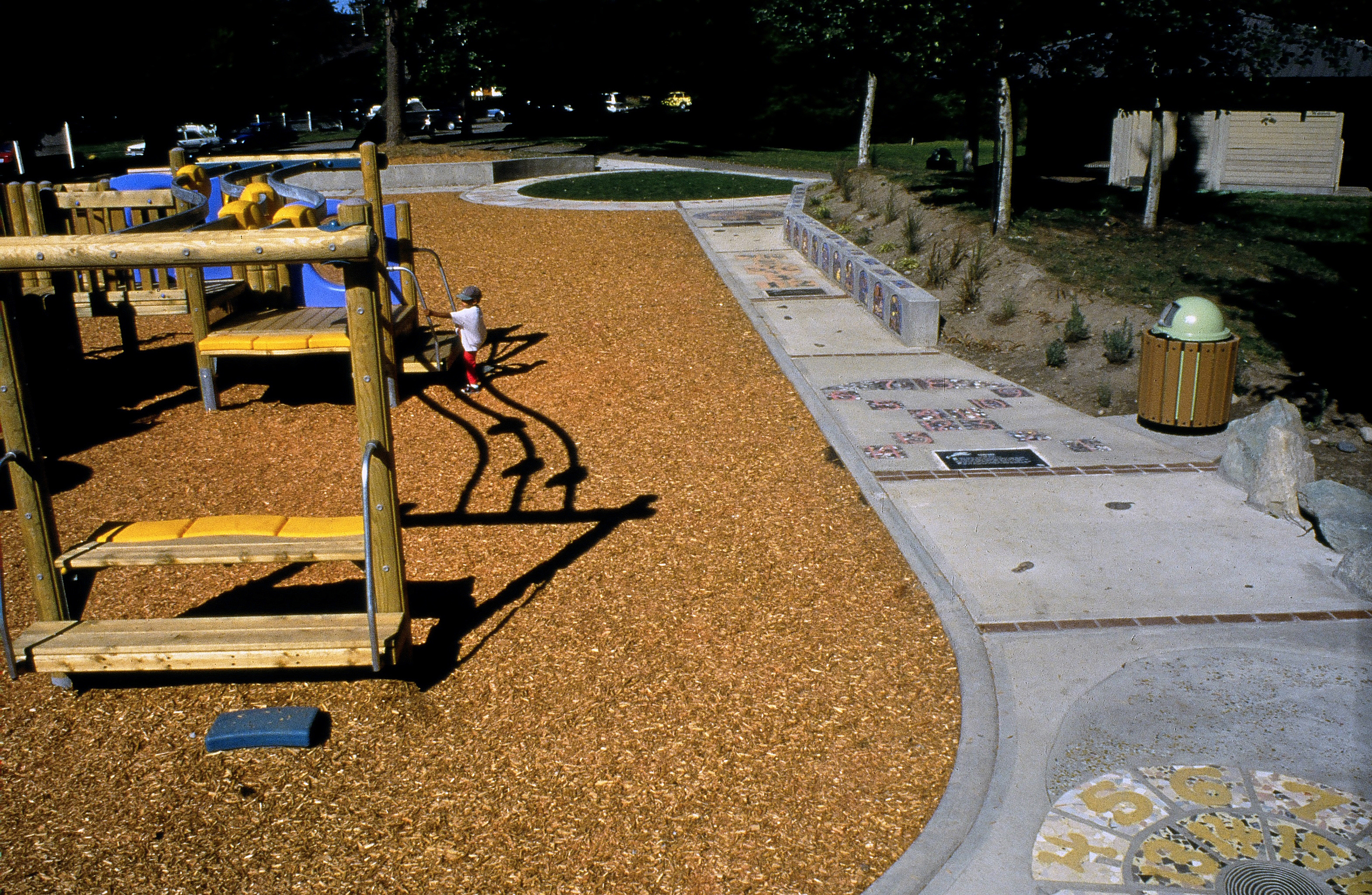
Facing NW. Soon after 2006 renovation

Licton Springs and the Sunny Walter–Pillings Pond are part of the Densmore Drainage Basin. The springs at the North Police Precinct and North Seattle Community College are headwaters of the south fork of Thornton Creek; this fork flows through culverts under I-5 and the south lot of Northgate Mall development. These neighborhoods are natural extensions of Maple Leaf downstream. Neighborhood activists and North Seattle Community College (NSCC) have been promoting habitat restoration in support. NSCC grounds have a nationally-recognized native habitat, a pentimento of restored native species on a palimpsest of former 1940s suburb, former dairy farm, former bog where native dxʷdəwʔabš harvested cranberries.

== See also ==
- Aurora Commons
- Thornton Creek
- Northgate district of neighborhoods
- Pilling's Pond

== Bibliography ==
- "About NSCC". NSCC Home > About NSCC: Welcome. North Seattle Community College. n.d. Archived from the original on April 10, 2006.
- "About the Seattle City Clerk's On-line Information Services". Information Services. Seattle City Clerk's Office. April 30, 2006.
  See heading, "Note about limitations of these data".
- Bowditch, Elise; Wang, Man; Wilson, Matthew (January 30, 2002). "North Seattle Community College Trail Siting". GEOG461 Urban GIS, Department of Geography. University of Washington. Archived from the original on September 17, 2006.
  Elise Bowditch, Teaching Assistant; Man Wang, Teaching Assistant; Matthew W. Wilson, Research Associate.
- Brokaw, Michael (n.d.). "Grounds Department Wetland". North Seattle Community College Grounds Maintenance. Archived from the original on November 15, 2004.
- Dailey, Tom (n.d.). "Duwamish-Seattle". coastsalishmap.org.
  Page links to Village Descriptions Duwamish-Seattle section.
  Dailey referenced "Puget Sound Geography" by T. T. Waterman. Washington DC: National Anthropological Archives, mss. [n.d.] [ref. 2];
  Duwamish et al. vs. United States of America, F-275. Washington DC: US Court of Claims, 1927. [ref. 5];
  "Indian Lake Washington" by David Buerge in the Seattle Weekly, 1–7 August 1984 [ref. 8];
  "Seattle Before Seattle" by David Buerge in the Seattle Weekly, 17–23 December 1980. [ref. 9];
  The Puyallup-Nisqually by Marian W. Smith. New York: Columbia University Press, 1940. [ref. 10].
  Recommended start is "Coast Salish Villages of Puget Sound".
- Dolan, Maria; True, Kathryn (2003). "North Seattle Community College Wetlands". Nature in the city: Seattle. Seattle: Mountaineers Books. pp. 242–7. ISBN 0-89886-879-3. (paperback).
- Hodson, Jeff (February 16, 2000). "Restoration urged for Thornton Creek: Local News". The Seattle Times.
  Was, NF.
- "Licton Springs Neighborhood: Local Interest". Licton Springs Community Council. Winter 2000. Archived from the original on June 2, 2006.
- Lakw’alas (Speer, Thomas R.) (July 22, 2004). "Chief Si'ahl". www.duwamishtribe.org/html/chief_si_ahl.html Chief Si’ahl]. Archived from the original (DOC) on June 23, 2006.
  Includes bibliography.
- "North College Park". Seattle City Clerk's Neighborhood Map Atlas. Office of the Seattle City Clerk. n.d. Archived from the original on May 5, 2006.
  "NN-1030S", "NN-1040S".jpg dated 17 June 2002.
- "Northgate". Seattle City Clerk's Neighborhood Map Atlas. Office of the Seattle City Clerk. n.d.
- Phelps, Myra L. (1978). Public works in Seattle. Seattle: Seattle Engineering Department. ISBN 0-9601928-1-6.
- "Restoration Activities: A Few of Our Accomplishments". Thornton Creek Alliance, Seattle Community Network. n.d.
- Shenk, Carol; Pollack, Laurie; Dornfeld, Ernie; Frantilla, Anne; Neman, Chris (June 26, 2002). "About neighborhood maps". Seattle City Clerk's Office Neighborhood Map Atlas. Information Services, Seattle City Clerk's Office.
  Sources for this atlas and the neighborhood names used in it include a 1980 neighborhood map produced by the Department of Community Development (relocated to the Department of Neighborhoods and other agencies), Seattle Public Library indexes, a 1984-1986 Neighborhood Profiles feature series in the Seattle Post-Intelligencer, numerous parks, land use and transportation planning studies, and records in the Seattle Municipal Archives.
  [Maps "NN-1120S", "NN-1130S", "NN-1140S".Jpg [sic] dated 13 June 2002; "NN-1030S", "NN-1040S".jpg dated 17 June 2002.]
- Sheridan, Mimi; Tobin, Carol (n.d.). "A Neighborhood History". Licton Springs Community Council.
- Sheridan, Mimi; Tobin, Carol (July 17, 2001). Wilma David (ed.). "Seattle Neighborhoods: Licton Springs – Thumbnail History". HistoryLink.org Essay 3447.
  Authors referenced Clarence B. Bagley, History of Seattle (Chicago, S. J. Clarke Publishing, 1916); Sophie Frye Bass, Pig-Tail Days in Old Seattle (Portland: Binfords & Mort, 1937); David Buerge, "The Maps of the Early Shoreline Area", typescript dated 1996, Shoreline Historical Museum; David Buerge, "Any There There?" The Weekly, June 18, 1997; David Buerge, "Seattle Before Seattle", The Weekly, December 17–23, 1980; Paul Burch, "The Story of Licton Springs", The Westerner, September 1908; W. E. Chambers, "The Pacific Highway", The Argus, December 17, 1921; Isobel Chapman, Northgate Reflections (Seattle: Isobel Chapman, May 1977); "The Club Salutes Lawrence Denny Lindsley", The Mountaineer, June 1974; Laura C. Daly, "A History of Cemeteries in the City of Seattle...", typescript dated 1984 in possession of Evergreen-Washelli, Seattle; Laura C. Daly, "Seattle's 'Cemetery of the Land of the Hereafter'", Portage, vol. 5, No. 1-2 (Winter/Spring 1984); Emily Inez Denny, Blazing the Way (Seattle: Rainier Printing Company, 1909); Emily Inez Denny, Notebooks, Museum of History and Industry, Seattle (hereafter MOHAI); Victory Denny, Notebooks – Licton Springs, MOHAI; "Denny’s Mineral Springs", Seattle Post-Intelligencer, October 13, 1883, p. 2; Margaret Collins Denny Dixon and Elizabeth Chapman Denny Vann, Denny Genealogy, Vols. 1-3 (New York: National Historical Society: 1944-1951); Paul Dorpat, "Licton Park Home", The Seattle Times, September 15, 1996; The Freeways in Seattle, (Olympia: Washington State Highway Commission, 1962); Faye M. Garneau, "History of Aurora" in Aurora Avenue Merchants Association Newsletter; "Henry L. Denny, Sound Pioneer, Celebrates 91", The Seattle Times, September 15, 1929; King County, Real Property Assessment Rolls, various dates; Janice Krenmayr, Footloose in Seattle, Vol. 1 (Seattle: Seattle Times Company, 1963); Kroll’s Atlas of King County (Seattle: Kroll Map Company, 1912 and 1926); Calvin Lew, "Principles Used in Planning and Developing Suburban Shopping Centers...", MBA thesis, University of Washington, 1951; "Licton Park to be Site of Sanitarium", The Interlaken, March 9, 1907; Rae Tufts, "Little-known Park has Hot Springs", The Seattle Times, September 12, 1982; Jay Miller, Shamanic Odyssey: The Lushootseed Salish Journey to the Land of the Dead (Menlo Park, CA: Ballena Press, 1988); Brandt Morgan, Enjoying Seattle’s Parks, (Seattle: Greenwood Publications, 1979); Gordon Newell, Westward to Alki: The Story of David and Louisa Denny (Seattle: Superior Publishing, 1977); "The Northgate Story", Seattle Post-Intelligencer, December 3, 1965; "Oak Lake School Scrapbook", 1886–1959, Seattle School District; Olmsted Brothers Office, plans of Licton Springs, Job No. 3347, 1907; National Park Service, Frederick Law Olmsted National Historical Site, Olmsted Plans and Drawings Collection, Brookline, MA; R. L. Polk, Seattle City Directories (various dates); Puget Sound Regional Archives, Property Record Cards; "Scenes Around Licton Springs...", The Seattle Times, March 10, 1907; "Seattle Spa", Ibid., September 13, 1964; Jan Silver, "Seattle’s Painted Waters", in Puget Soundings, October 1980; A Field Guide to Seattle’s Public Art ed. by Diane Shamash and Steven Huss (Seattle: 1991); Don Sherwood, "Licton Springs Park", in "Interpretive Essays of the Histories of Seattle's Parks and Playfields", handwritten bound manuscript dated 1977, Sherwood Collection at Seattle Municipal Archives; Paul Burch, "The Story of Licton Springs", The Westerner, September 1908; Nile Thompson and Carolyn J. Marr, Building for Learning: Seattle Public School Histories (Seattle: Seattle Public Schools, 2002); Nile Robert Thompson, "The Original Residents of Shilshole Bay" in Passport to Ballard (Seattle: Ballard News Tribune, 1988); U.S. General Land Office, Washington Plat Book, Vol. 26, 127, National Archives, Pacific Northwest Region; Oregon and Washington Donation Land Files, 1851–1903, (Washington, D.C.: U.S. National Archives, 1973); Rebecca E. Walls, "Growing and Gathering: An Adaptive Re-use Plan for Greenwood Greenhouse", master's thesis, University of Washington, 1999; Thomas Talbot Waterman, "The Geographical Names Used by Indians of the Pacific Coast", The Geographical Review, Vol. 12 (1922); John R. Watt, Pioneering From Covered Wagons Onward (Roswell, GA: WH Wolfe Associates, 1995); Roberta Frye Watt, Four Wagons West, (Portland: Binford & Mort, 1931); Warren W. Wing, To Seattle by Trolley (Edmonds, Washington: Pacific Fast Mail, 1988); Mimi Sheridan and Carol Tobin interview of Chuck and June Pilling, November 17, 2000; and of Sayo Harmeling and Bea Kumasaka, February 24, 2001.
- Walter, Sunny; local Audubon chapters (February 10, 2006). "Sunny Walter's Washington Nature Weekends: Wildlife Viewing Locations - Greater Seattle Area". Archived from the original on March 22, 2005.
  "with additions by Sunny Walter and local Audubon chapters."
  Viewing locations only; the book has walks, hikes, wildlife, and natural wonders.
  Walter excerpted from
- Dolan, Maria; True, Kathryn (2003). Nature in the city: Seattle. Seattle: Mountaineers Books. ISBN 0-89886-879-3. (paperback).
  See "Northeast Seattle" section, bullet points "Meadowbrook", "Paramount Park Open Space", "North Seattle Community College Wetlands", and "Sunny Walter – Twin Ponds".
