= Theodore N. Haller =

American lawyer

Theodore Newell Haller (1864 – 1930, aged 65-66) was a prominent American businessman, attorney, writer, and civic leader in Seattle, Washington. He founded Haller City, Washington, now Arlington, Washington. Haller Lake, a lake and neighborhood in Seattle, is named after him.

Theodore Haller (Morris) was the son of Henrietta and Granville O. Haller, a former Civil War officer and one of Seattle's leading postbellum businessmen. After being educated at Yale University, he returned to Seattle and graduated from law school. He established one of the city's leading practices.

In 1905, he platted a cluster of lots around the lake that would bear his name. The Haller Fountain in Port Townsend was donated to the town by Haller. It had first been displayed at the Chicago Exhibition of 1893.
