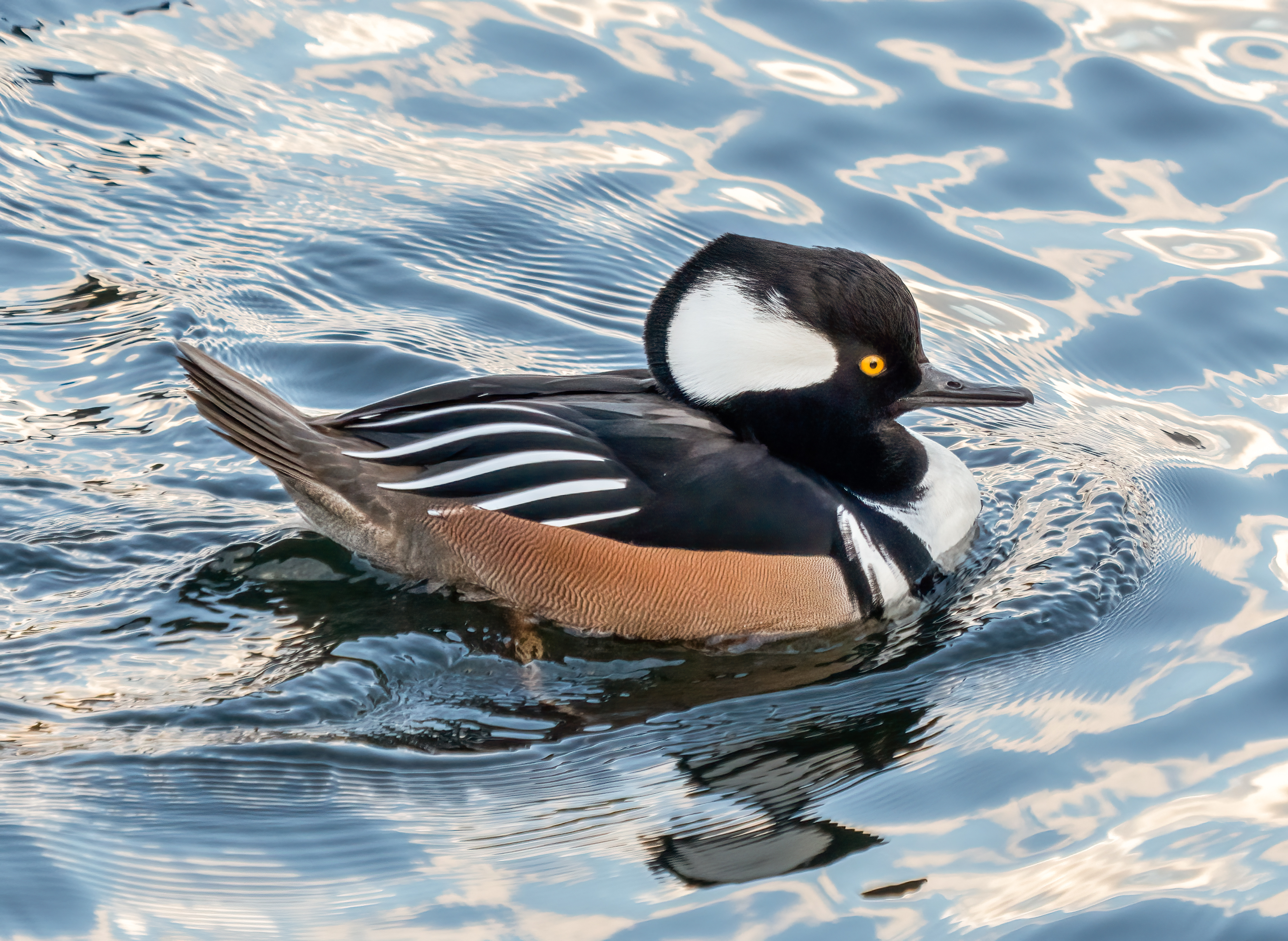
- Male
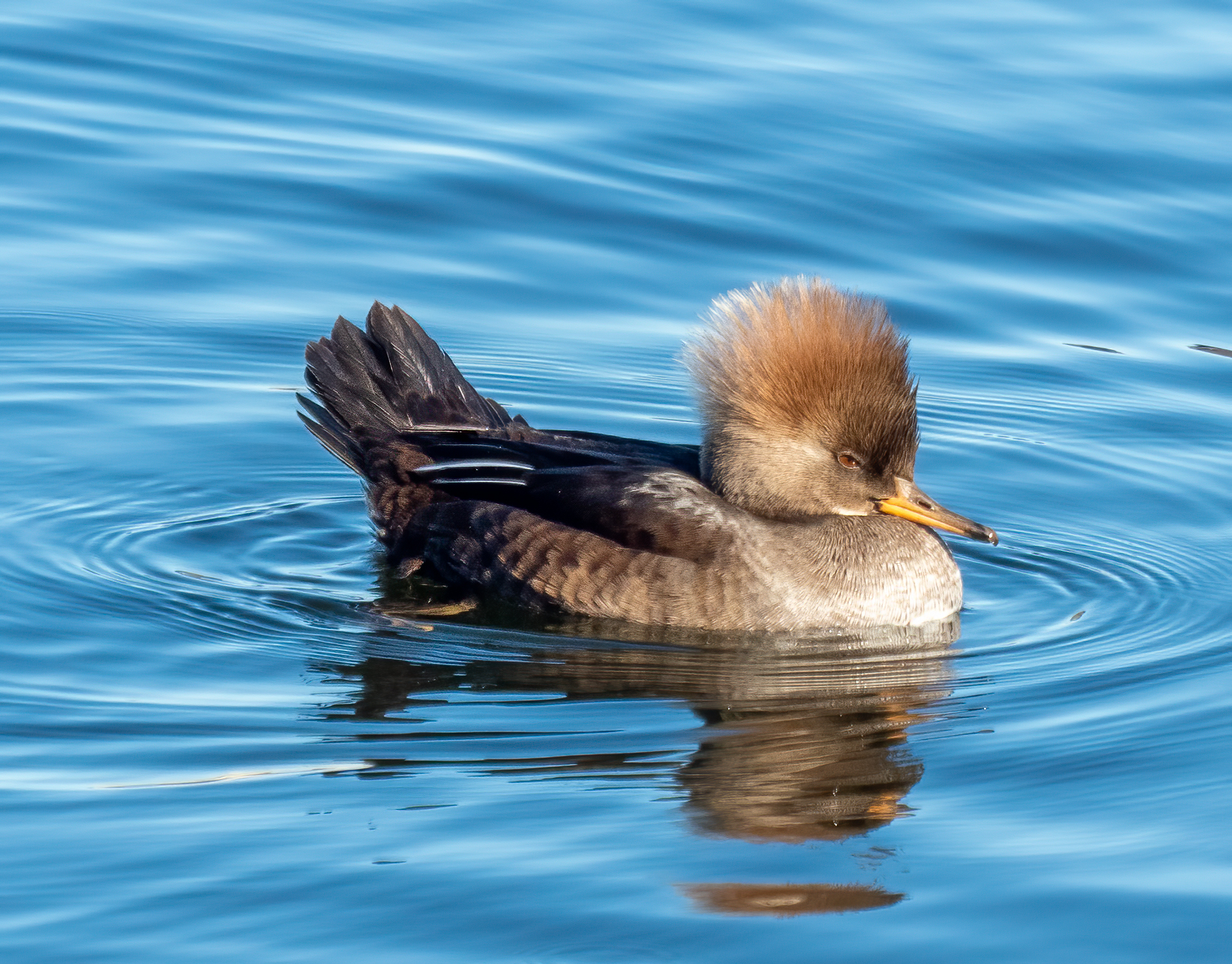
- Female

Conservation status
- Least Concern (IUCN 3.1)

Scientific classification
- Kingdom: Animalia
- Phylum: Chordata
- Class: Aves
- Order: Anseriformes
- Family: Anatidae
- Genus: Lophodytes; Reichenbach, 1853
- Species: L. cucullatus

Binomial name
- Lophodytes cucullatus (Linnaeus, 1758)
- Breeding Migration Year-round Nonbreeding

Synonyms
- Mergus cucullatus Linnaeus, 1758

= Hooded merganser =

Species of bird

The hooded merganser (Lophodytes cucullatus) is a species of fish-eating duck in the subfamily Anatinae. It is the only extant species in the genus Lophodytes. The genus name derives from Greek: lophos meaning 'crest', and dutes meaning 'diver'. The bird is striking in appearance; both sexes have crests that they can raise or lower, and the breeding plumage of the male is handsomely patterned and colored. The hooded merganser has a sawbill but is not classified as a typical merganser.

Hooded mergansers are the second-smallest species of merganser, with only the smew of Europe and Asia being smaller, and it also is the only merganser whose native habitat is restricted to North America.

== Taxonomy ==
The hooded merganser was formally described in 1758 by the Swedish naturalist Carl Linnaeus in the tenth edition of his Systema Naturae under the binomial name Mergus cucullatus. Linnaeus based his account on the "round-crested duck" that had been described and illustrated by the English naturalist Mark Catesby in the first volume of his The Natural History of Carolina, Florida and the Bahama Islands that was published between 1729 and 1732. Linnaeus specified the type location as America but this was restricted to Virginia and Carolina following Catesby. The hooded merganser is now the only species placed in the genus Lophodytes that was introduced in 1853 by the German naturalist Ludwig Reichenbach. The species is monotypic: no subspecies are recognised. The genus name combines the Ancient Greek lophos meaning "crest" with dutēs meaning "diver". The specific epithet cucullatus is Latin meaning "hooded".

A species of fossil merganser from the Late Pleistocene of Vero Beach, Florida, was described as Querquedula floridana (a genus now included in Anas), but upon reexamination turned out to be a species closely related to the hooded merganser; it is now named Lophodytes floridanus, but the exact relationship between this bird and the modern species is unknown.

== Description ==
The hooded merganser is a sexually dimorphic species. The adult female has a greyish-brown body, with a narrow white patch over the lower breast and belly. She has a light reddish-brown crest extending from the back of the head. During the nonbreeding season the male looks similar to the female, except that his eyes are yellow and the female's eyes are brown.

In breeding plumage the dorsal areas and the head, neck and breast of the mature male are mainly black with white markings; there are large white patches on either side of the crest, and they are particularly conspicuous when he raises his crest during courtship. His lower flanks are a rich reddish-brown or chestnut in colour, and the breast and undersides are more or less white, extending into white stripes across the crop and breast.

In both sexes there are narrow white stripes along the tertial wing feathers; when the bird is in repose they have the appearance of longitudinal white stripes along the bird's lower back, if they are visible.

First-winter birds differ from adult females in appearance in that they have a grey-brown neck and upper parts; the upper parts of adult females are much darker — nearly black. Furthermore, the young birds have narrower white edges to their tertial feathers than adults do. Females of all ages are dark-eyed, whereas in males the eyes become pale during their first winter.

Measurements:

- Length: 15.8–19.3 in (40–49 cm)
- Weight: 16.0–31.0 oz (453–879 g)
- Wingspan: 23.6–26.0 in (60–66 cm)
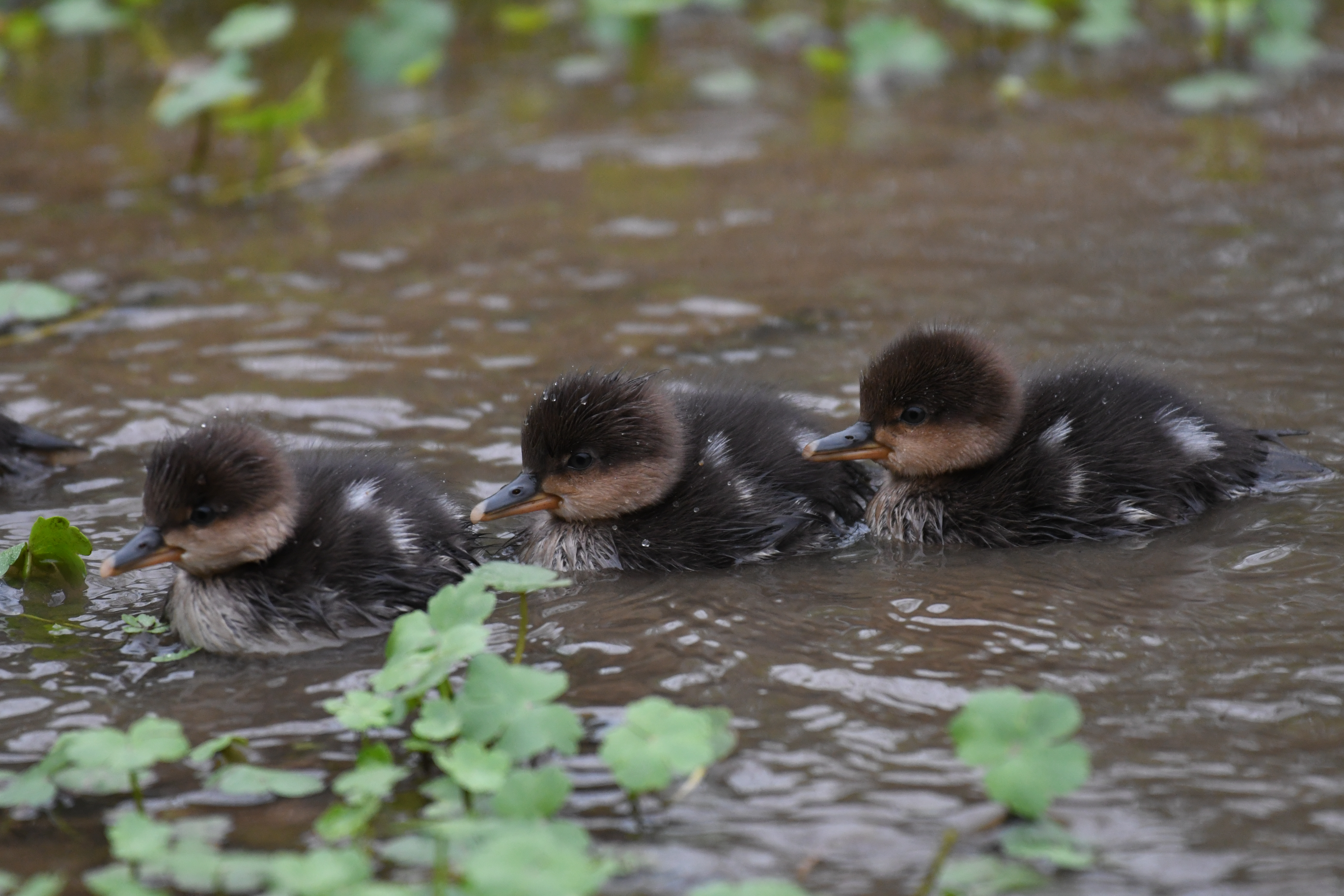
Chicks

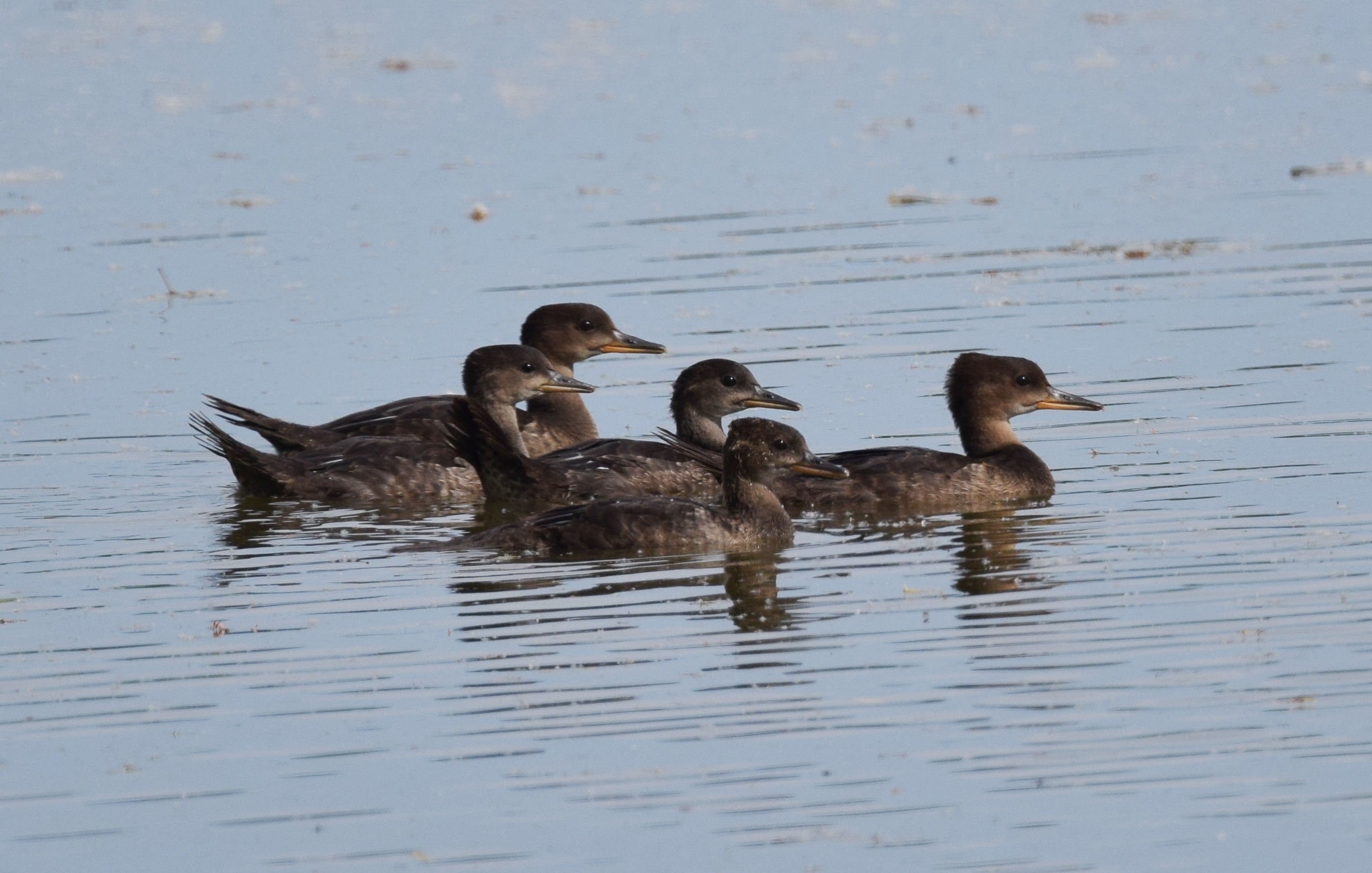
Juvenile

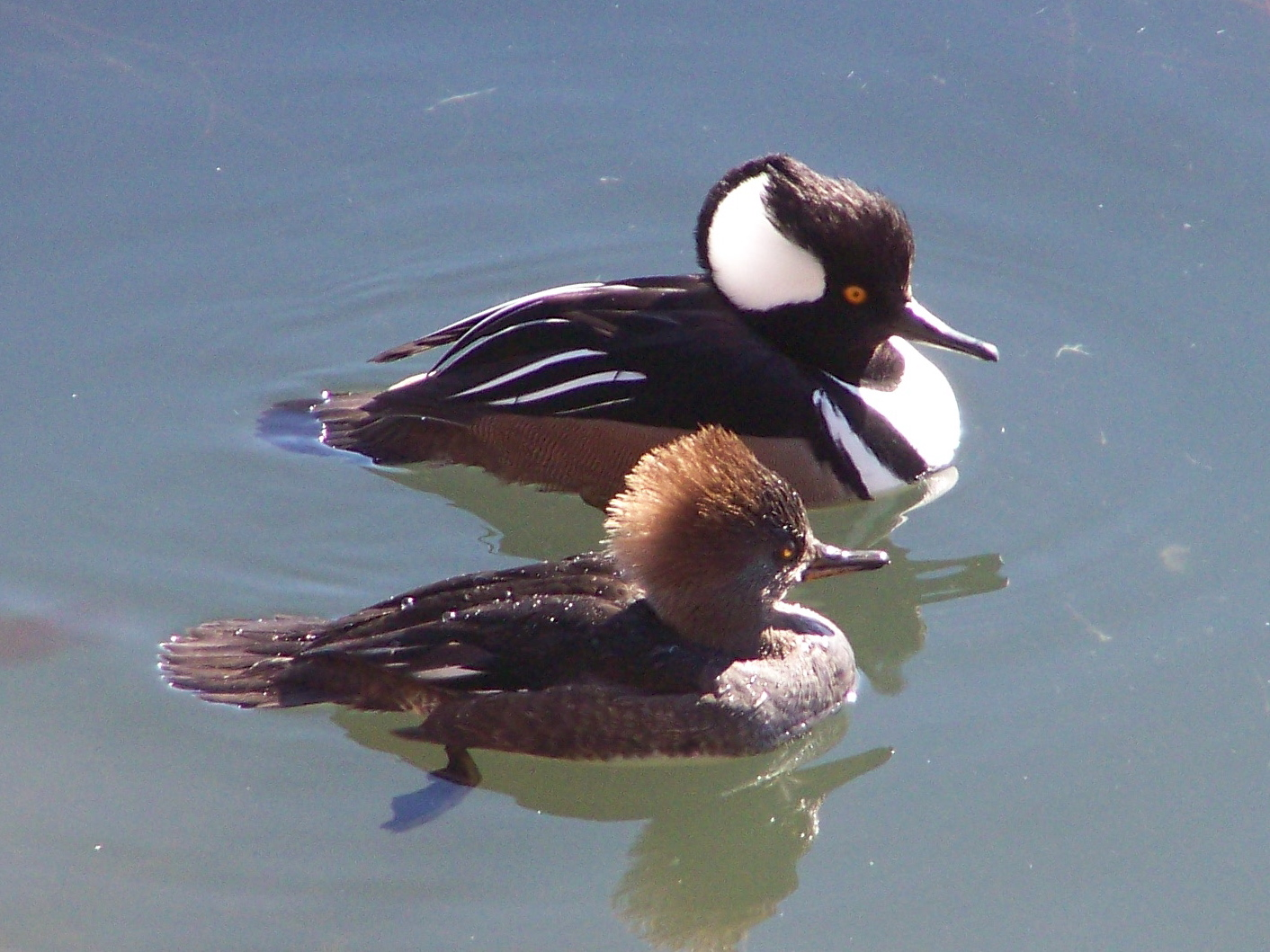
Adult male and female pair

== Distribution and habitat ==
Hooded mergansers are short-distance migrants, and they winter in the United States in regions where winter temperatures allow for ice-free conditions on ponds, lakes and rivers. They have two major year-round ranges. One is in the eastern United States from the southern Canada–US border along the Atlantic Coast to the Gulf Coast in the region of the Mississippi delta. A smaller year-round range extends from Washington state and southern British Columbia to northern Idaho. They also breed to some extent in regions from Missouri to southern Canada and from Nova Scotia to eastern North Dakota and Saskatchewan, migrating when necessary to avoid winter conditions. From 1966 to 2015, the hooded merganser experienced a >1.5% yearly population increase throughout its breeding range.

For preference the hooded merganser lives on small bodies of water such as ponds and small estuaries where there is ample emergent aquatic vegetation, but it also inhabits larger wetlands, impoundments, flooded timber, and rivers. They prefer fresh water but do occur on brackish water bodies as well.

=== Feral to Europe ===
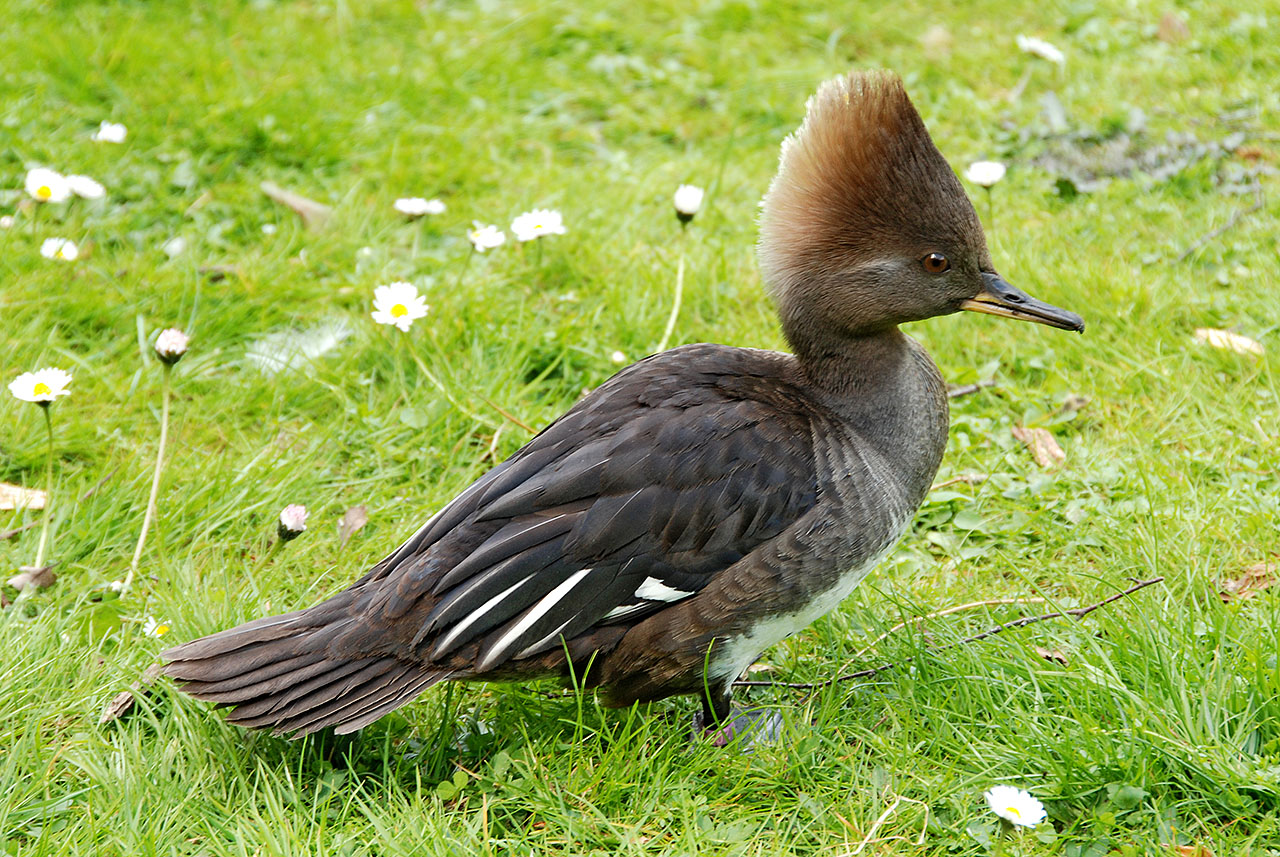
Female at Walsrode Bird Park, Germany

Although the hooded merganser is a common species in captivity in Europe and most specimens recorded in the wild are regarded as escapes, or feral animals, a small number of birds have been regarded as genuinely wild vagrants. Britain's current first accepted record is a bird which was seen on North Uist in October 2000. Small numbers are seen regularly in Dublin, but these are presumed to be feral.

== Behaviour and ecology ==
=== Food and feeding ===
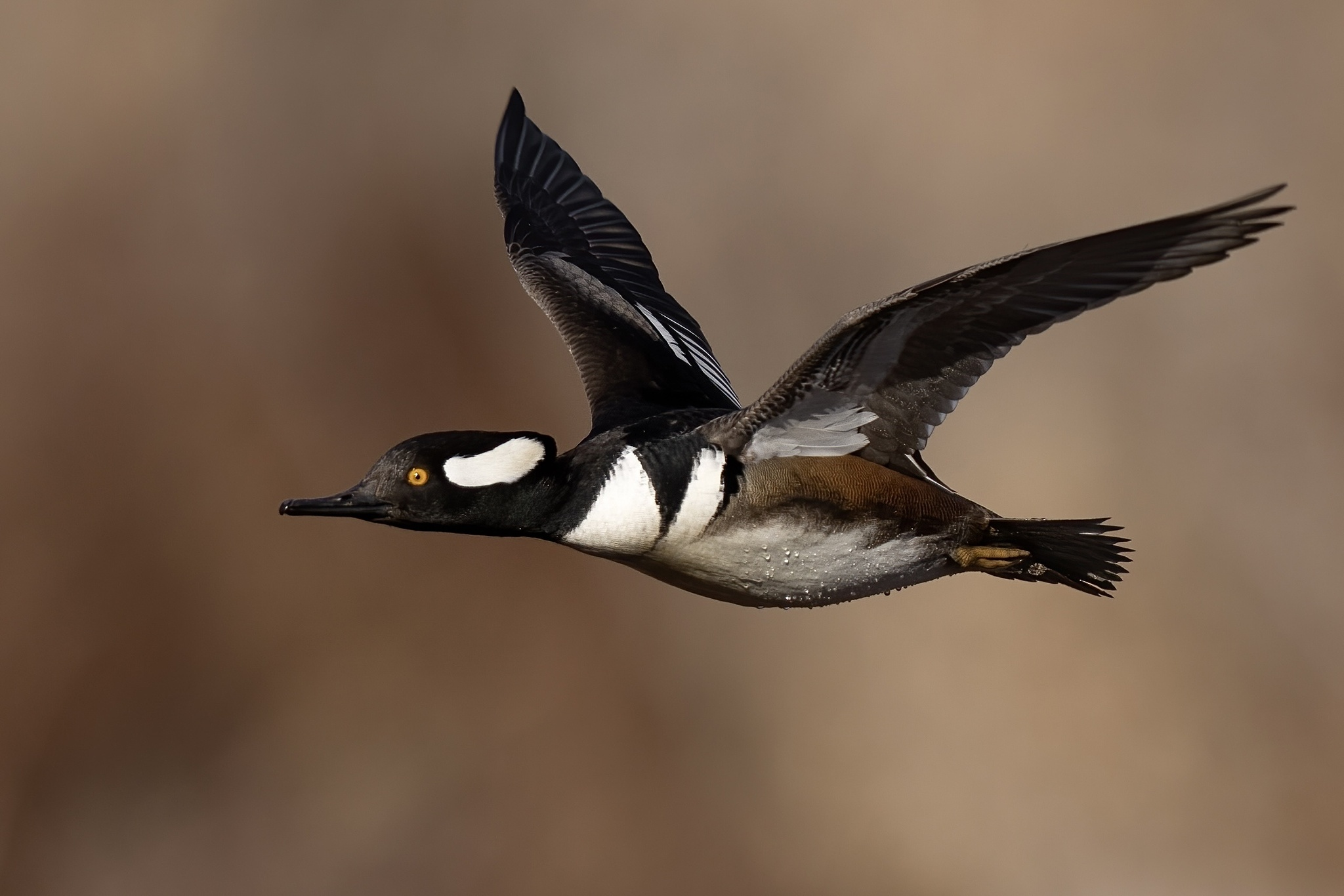
Male in flight, in Virginia

The hooded merganser is a diving predator that largely hunts by sight while under water. Most studies report that its diet varies according to circumstances, usually being dominated by fish (44–81%). In addition it feeds on aquatic insects (13–20% of its diet) and other aquatic invertebrates such as crabs and crayfish (22 to 50%).

=== Breeding ===
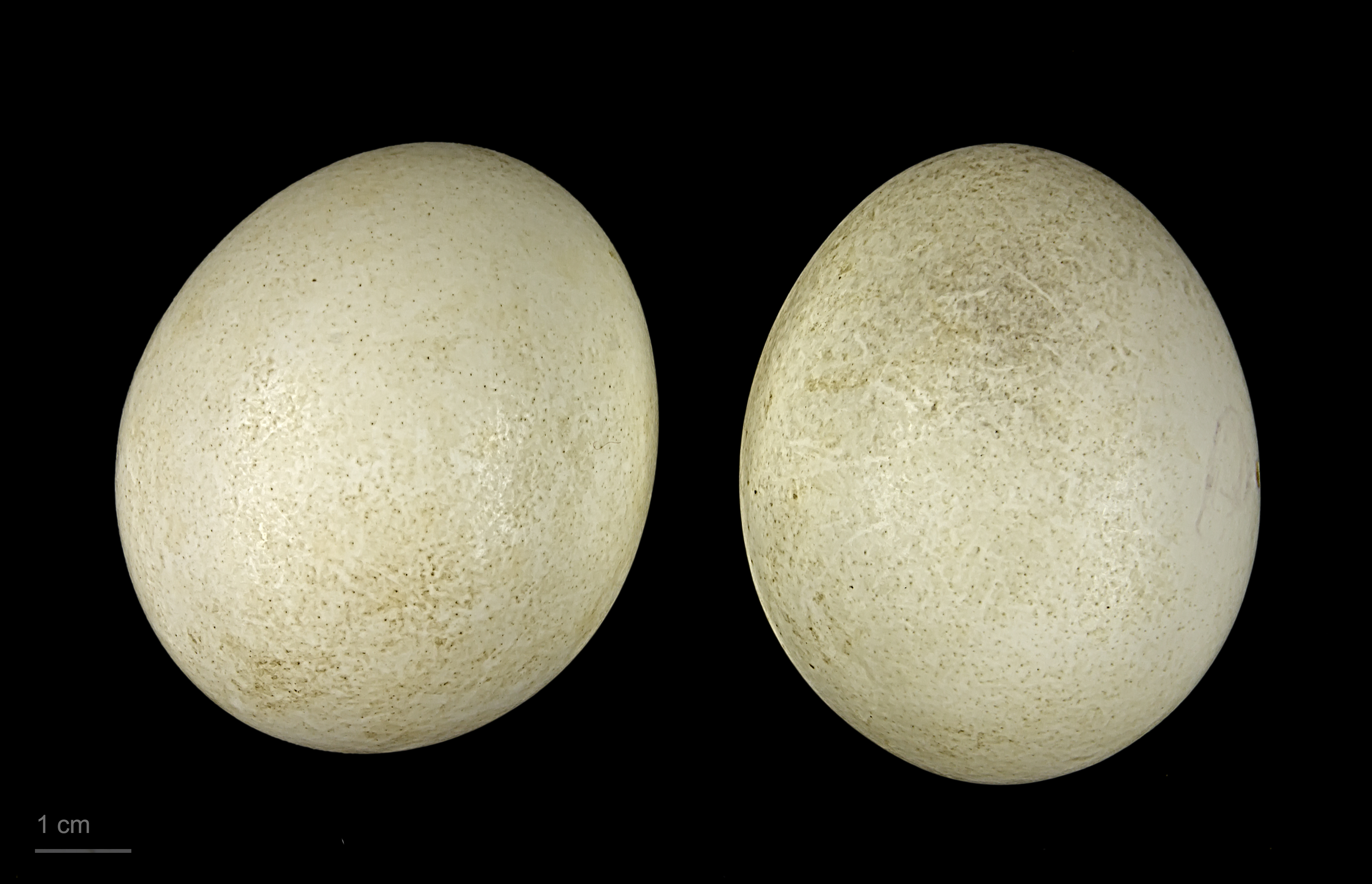
Lophodytes cucullatus – MHNT

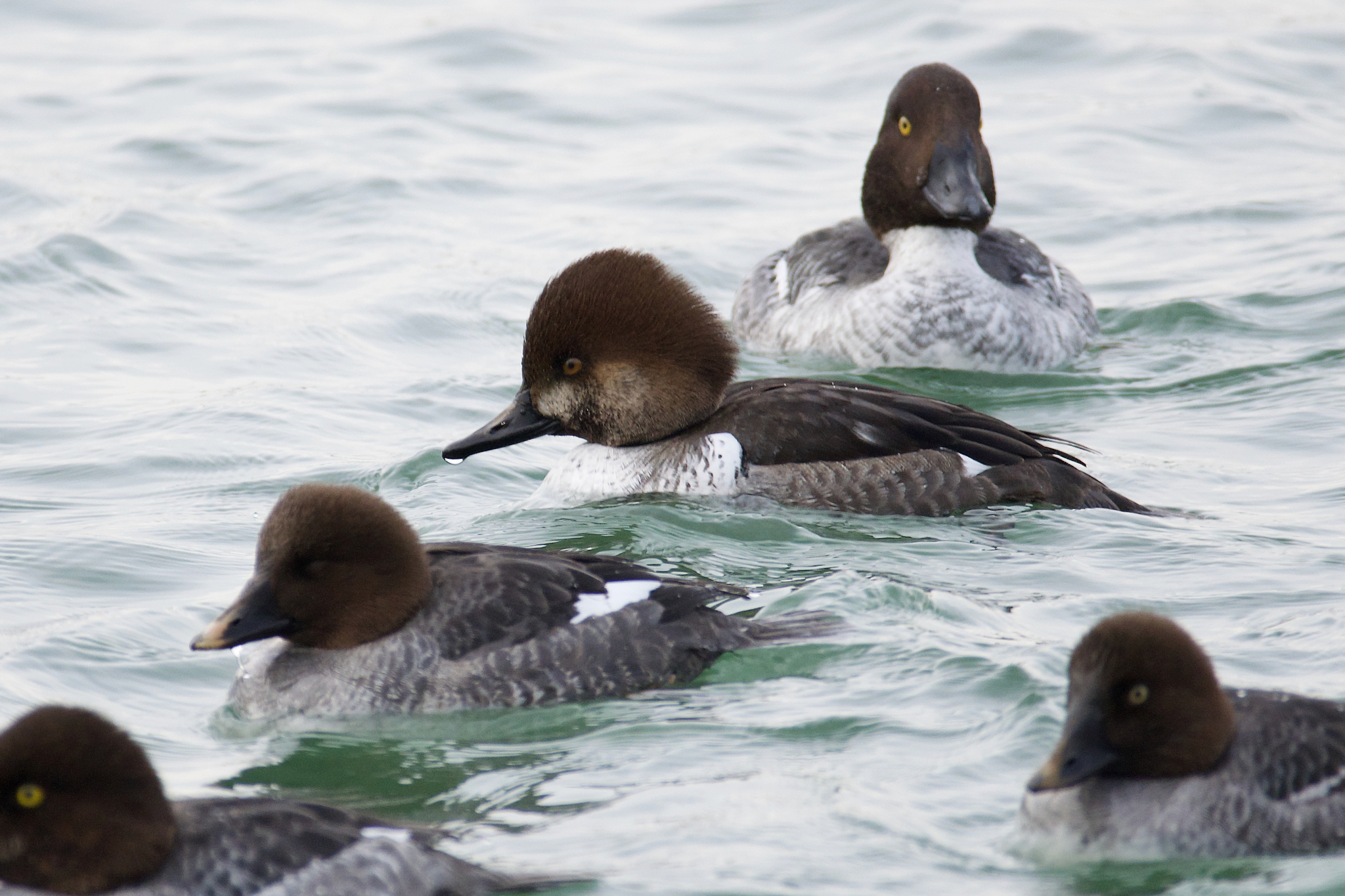
Hybrid with common goldeneye, in Ontario

Males and females of the hooded merganser form monogamous pairs and they remain together until the female has selected a nesting cavity and completed laying her clutch. After that, the male leaves the female to incubate and care for the brood. Females will actively seek out cavities in dead trees or artificial nest boxes such as those provided for nesting wood ducks. They prefer cavities 4–15 feet (1.2–4.6 m) off the ground. Breeding occurs anytime between the end of February and the end of June, depending on the region.

The eggs measure 4.3–6.2 cm (1.7–2.4 in) in length and 3.9–5.4 cm (1.5–2.1 in) width.

The female will lay a clutch of 7–15 eggs but only begins incubation when the last egg has been laid, thereby permitting synchronous hatching. All hatchlings are consequently of the same size, which facilitates efficient parental care. During incubation, the female may lose anywhere from 8% to 16% of her body weight.

Like most waterfowl, hooded merganser hatchlings are precocial and usually leave the nest within 24 hours after they hatch; this is about long enough to accommodate synchronous hatching. Once they leave the nest, the young are capable of diving and foraging, but remain with the female for warmth and protection.

== Management and conservation ==
Population declines historically have been linked with large-scale deforestation. Because these waterfowl are cavity nesters, they require mature trees in which cavities have been excavated, however, they also will use nest boxes supplied by humans. The global population of hooded mergansers is currently rapidly increasing; as of 2021, there are an estimated 1.1 million mature individuals across their range.

Because of their high reliance on aquatic prey, hooded mergansers are susceptible to harm from many types of pollution, some of which are poisons that accumulate in the food organisms, directly poisoning predators high in the food chain, and some of which simply reduce the populations of their prey.

== See also ==
- Pilling's Pond
