= Haller Lake, Seattle =

Lake and neighborhood in Seattle, Washington

Haller Lake
- sisaɬtəb
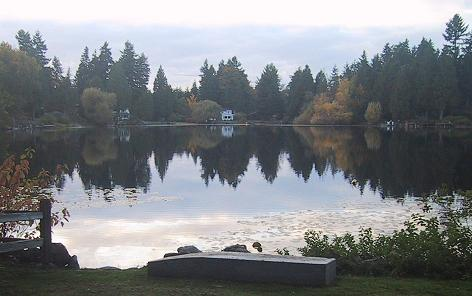
- View from shore of Haller Lake

- Location within Washington (state) Location within the United States
- Location: North central Seattle, Washington
- Coordinates: 47°43′11″N 122°20′00″W
- Type: lake
- Etymology: Theodore N. Haller
- Catchment area: 280 acres (110 ha)
- Basin countries: United States
- Surface area: 15 acres (6.1 ha)
- Max. depth: 36 ft (11 m)
- Water volume: 247 acre⋅ft (305,000 m^{3})
- Surface elevation: 374 ft (114 m)

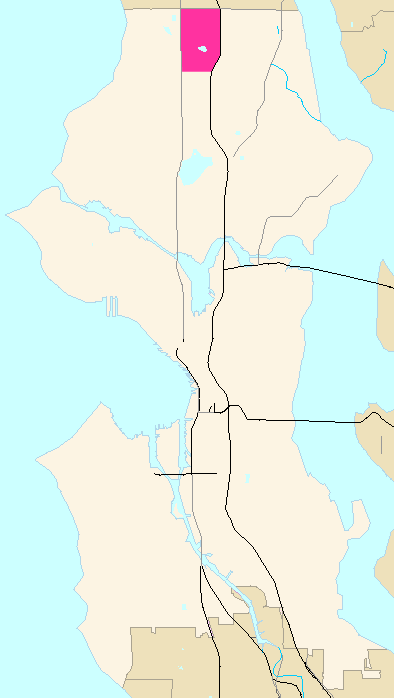
Haller Lake, within Seattle

Haller Lake (Lushootseed: sisaɬtəb) is a small lake and neighborhood in north central Seattle, Washington, named for Theodore N. Haller, who platted the neighborhood in 1905. His father, Granville O. Haller, was one of Seattle's early settlers, an army officer who amassed a large estate in the region.

The lake was formed as a result of a block of ice left behind by a retreating glacier. When the ice melted, a depression was left in the ground that was then filled with water.

The Lushootseed-language name for the lake is sisaɬtəb, which means "calmed down a little." The lake was a hunting ground and a refuge for the Shilshole people during slave raids from the northern peoples like the Tlingit and Haida. Early Europeans called it Welch Lake after it was claimed in the 1880s by a British immigrant named John Welch.

The lake is located between N. 128th Street to the north, N. 122nd Street to the south, Densmore Avenue N. to the west, and Corliss Avenue N. to the east. It covers 15 acres (6.1 ha); its volume is 247 acre⋅ft (305,000 cubic metres) and its maximum depth is 36 feet (11 m). Its shoreline is private except for two public access points, the Meridian Avenue N. right-of-way on the north shore and the N. 125th Street right-of-way on the west, which features a small park. Haller Lake has a drainage area of about 280 acres (110 ha); it discharges water through an outlet control structure on the west side of the lake that drains to Lake Union.

The boundaries of the neighborhood are N. 145th Street to the north, beyond which is the city of Shoreline; N. Northgate Way to the south, beyond which is Licton Springs; State Route 99 (Aurora Avenue) to the west, beyond which is Bitter Lake; and Interstate 5 to the east, beyond which is Jackson Park.

Within the neighborhood are Northacres Park, a large, forested public park east of the lake on 1st Avenue N.E.; Ingraham High School, north of the lake on N. 130th Street; Lakeside School, alma mater of Microsoft founders Bill Gates and Paul Allen, actor Adam West, and former Washington Governor Booth Gardner, in the northeast corner of the neighborhood; and Northwest Hospital & Medical Center, which occupies a 33-acre (13 ha) campus southwest of the lake on N. 115th Street.

The Haller Lake Community Club, just northwest of the lake at 12579 Densmore Avenue N., was formed in 1922 as the Haller Lake Improvement Club. It features a Wurlitzer theatre pipe organ installed in 1969.
