= Bitter Lake (Seattle) =

Lake in Seattle, Washington, United States

- č̓alqʷadiʔ
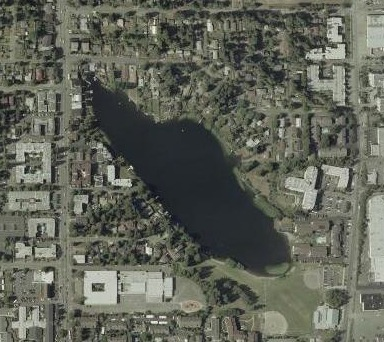
- Aerial image of Bitter Lake

- Location within Washington (state) Location within the United States
- Location: Northwest Seattle, Washington
- Coordinates: 47°43′36″N 122°21′08″W
- Basin countries: United States
- Surface area: 19 acres (7.7 ha)
- Average depth: 16 ft (4.9 m)
- Max. depth: 31 ft (9.4 m)

Bitter Lake (Lushootseed: č̓alq̓ʷadiʔ) is a small lake in northwest Seattle, Washington, USA.

The lake covers 19 acres (77,000 m^{2}), with a mean depth of 16 feet (4.9 m) and a maximum depth of 31 feet (9.4 m). Until 1913, a sawmill was located at its southwest corner. Tannic acid from logs dumped into the lake gave its water a bitter taste and the lake itself a name in English. In Lushootseed, the lake is called č̓alq̓ʷadiʔ, meaning "blackcaps on the sides," as it was a place where people historically came to collect these plants. It was also a refuge site for the Shilshole people when they experienced slave raids coming from the far north, in what is now Alaska and northern British Columbia.

It is a glacial lake with its basin having been dug 15,000 years ago by the Puget Lobe of the Cordilleran Ice Sheet, which also created Lake Washington, Union, Green, and Haller Lakes.

The Seattle-to-Everett Interurban streetcar reached the lake in 1906, and the Bitter Lake neighborhood was annexed by Seattle in 1954.

The lake is situated between Greenwood Avenue North to the west, Linden Avenue North to the east, North 137th Street to the north, and North 130th Street to the south. Bitter Lake drains through a piped outlet at its southeast end that eventually flows into Lake Union.
