= Homelessness in Seattle =

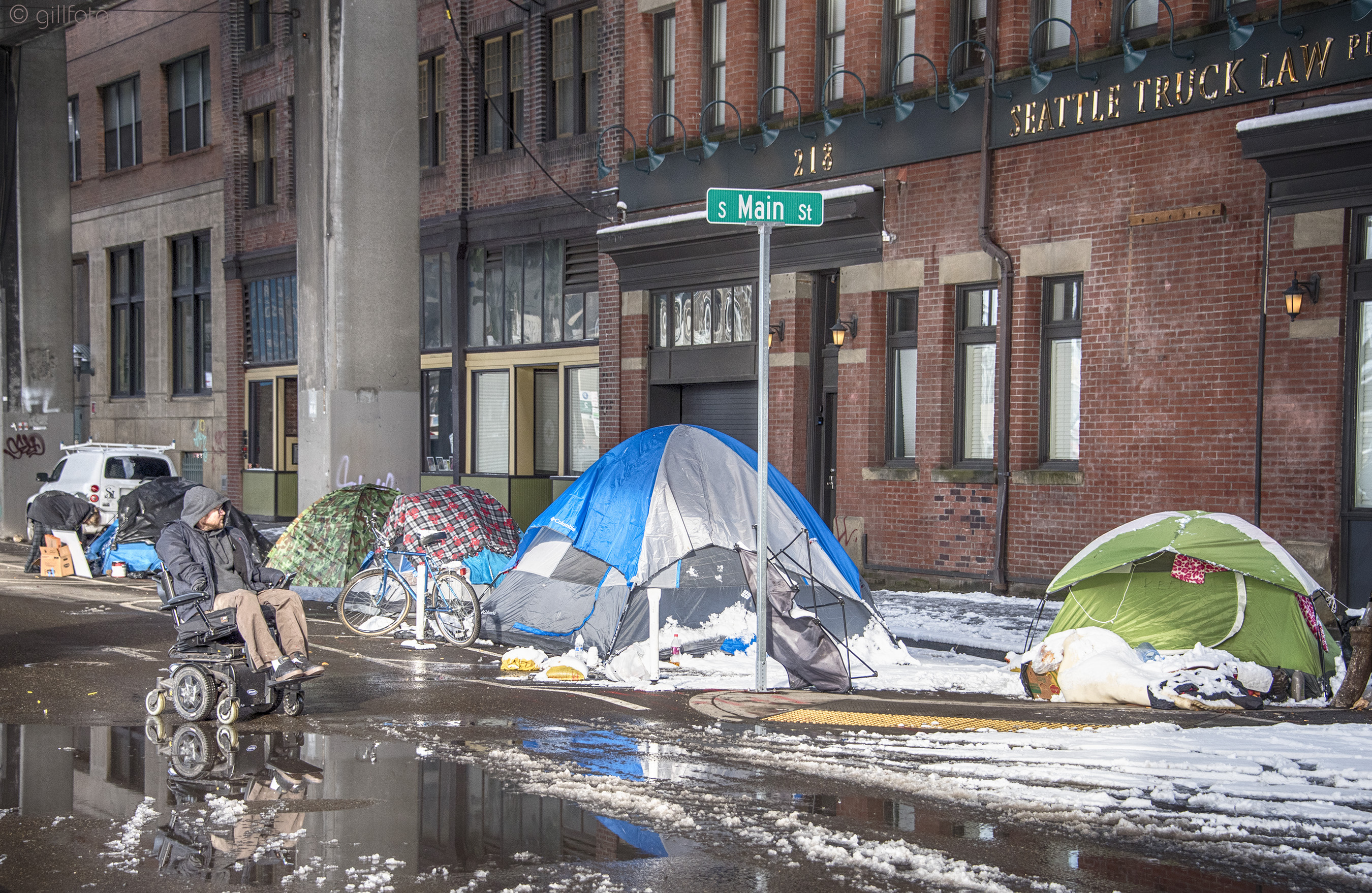
Alaskan Way Viaduct homeless

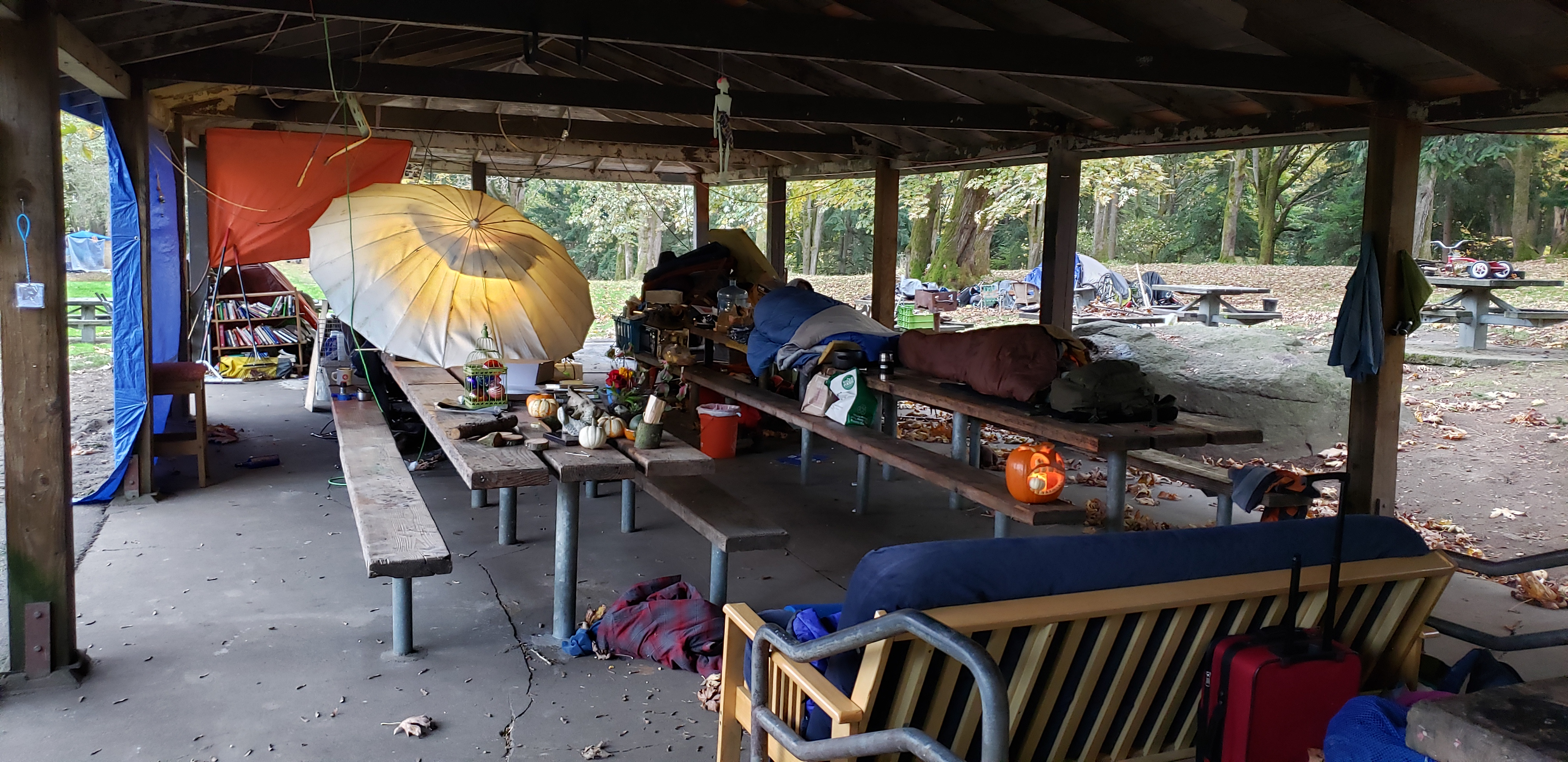
A shelter for picnicking in Woodland Park which has been repurposed by homeless people as a place to live

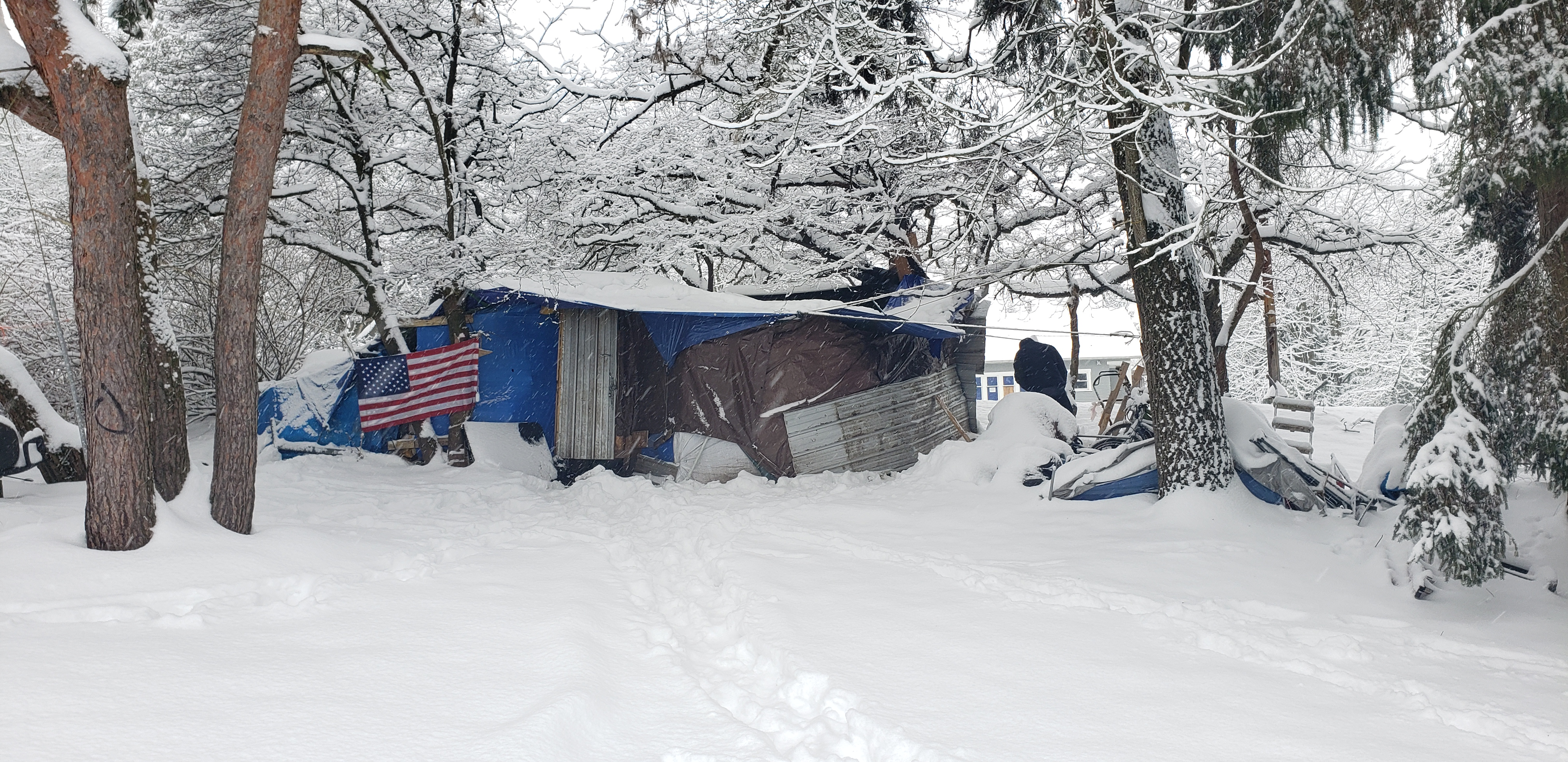
Homeless shanty in the snow

Many individuals in the Seattle-King County area do not have a home, or access to temporary shelter. In 2026, an estimated 18,365 people in the region were experiencing homelessness. Of those, 11,829 (64%) were unsheltered individuals, approximately one in three unhoused individuals were in emergency shelters, and just under 2000 were in transitional housing.

A 2026 survey indicated homelessness was experienced at different rates by race, relative to the population. Of those individuals experiencing homelessness: 31% were white, 24% were Hispanic/Latino, 24% were Black or African American, 9% were multi-racial, 5% were Native Hawaiian or Pacific Islander, 4.2% were Indigenous, American Indian, or Alaska Native, 2.4% were Asian or Asian American, and 0.4% were Middle Eastern or North African.

According to a 2019 survey, 84% of homeless people in Seattle-King County lived in the county prior to losing their housing, 11% lived in another county in Washington, and 5% lived outside the state. The Seattle city government has described homelessness as a crisis. The Seattle city government has proposed ideas for more permanent supportive housing to address the issue.

While the effect of mental illness and drug addiction is often cited as a primary driver of homelessness, differences in per capita homelessness rates across the country are more likely to be due to differences in the cost of housing rather than other factors.

West Coast cities, like Seattle, that have higher housing costs tend to have homelessness rates five times those of areas with much lower housing costs, like Arkansas, West Virginia, Detroit, and Chicago even though the latter locations have higher burdens of opioid addiction and poverty than their West Coast counterparts.

== History ==
The name "Skid Road" was in use in Seattle by the 1850s when the city's historic Pioneer Square neighborhood began to expand from its commercial core. The first known homeless person in Seattle was a Massachusetts sailor named Edward Moore, who was found in a tent on the waterfront in 1854.

== Causes ==
The root causes of homelessness are complex and multifaceted. According to a report issued by the mayor's office, these causes include mental health issues and struggles with addiction, economic disparities and poverty, lack of affordable housing, racial disparities, the criminal justice system, the decentralized response to a regional crisis, and lack of wrap-around services for youth within and exiting the foster system. Additionally, medical debt and medical debt-related bankruptcy can contribute to the housing crisis. According to a 2020 study that took place in Seattle, medical debt adds on approximately two years of homelessness. Legal debts, partially caused by the criminalization of acts connected to homelessness such as sleeping in public, are also linked to the continuing crisis.

In Seattle, the cost of living has risen substantially over the past decade. Activists, organizations, and the Seattle city government claim the affordability of housing is a large driver of homelessness. Many activists claim this rise in the cost of living and increases in homelessness is due to gentrification, a lack of publicly owned affordable housing, and the economic impact of the COVID-19 pandemic, as well as Amazon establishing its headquarters in downtown Seattle, which drove high-wage tech workers with more spending power to the city. Between 2010 and 2017, the median rental cost in Seattle rose 41.7%, while the national average increased by 17.6%. These have all culminated in an increase in the homeless population.

McKinsey claims that ending homelessness in King County would require both increased production of affordable housing, increased immediate shelter capacity, access to mental health services, as well as other local programs, and that costs to do so could range from $4.5 billion to $11 billion over the next decade.

=== Insufficient housing ===
In the book Homelessness Is a Housing Problem, Clayton Page Aldern and Gregg Colburn studied per capita homelessness rates across the country along with what possible factors might be influencing the rates, and found that high rates of homelessness are caused by shortages of affordable housing, not by mental illness, drug addiction, or poverty.

They found that mental illness, drug addiction, and poverty occur nationwide, but not all places have equally expensive housing costs. One example cited is that two states with high rates of opioid addiction, Arkansas and West Virginia, have low per capita rates of homelessness because of low housing prices. With respect to poverty, the city of Detroit is one of the poorest cities in the United States, yet Detroit's per capita homelessness rate is 20% of that of West Coast cities like Seattle, Portland, San Francisco, Los Angeles, and San Diego.

In an interview, Colburn stated: "To someone who says, 'Will housing fix all of this? Or will there still be people on the street?' We say that Seattle has five times the homelessness of Chicago. But there's still homelessness, and there are people panhandling in Chicago. And so we aren't suggesting that accommodating housing markets will end all homelessness. What we're saying is, it doesn't need to be five times what Chicago is."

== Problems faced by homeless people ==
=== Medical problems ===
Many homeless people also struggle with health problems, like diabetes. Many homeless people do not seek or cannot afford adequate healthcare. In 2026, homeless people are far more likely to experience chronic conditions than the average individual, with substantially higher rates regarding communicable and behavioral health conditions. Such health conditions can frequently include a history of alcohol or substance abuse; more than half had cardiovascular disease; and a quarter struggled from mental illnesses. Common causes of death among homeless people in the Seattle area include exposure, intoxication, cardiovascular disease, and homicide. In 2003, the average age of death of a homeless person was 47. 697 homeless people died in King County between 2012 and 2017.

=== Harassment ===
In December 2007, the Seattle City Council unanimously passed a measure prohibiting malicious harassment of a homeless person and declaring the act a misdemeanor. This law makes it illegal to damage a homeless person's personal items as well.

=== Extreme weather conditions ===
According to a 2023 study in Seattle, people facing homelessness in Seattle have had to endure days of extreme weather with both high and freezing temperatures. Additionally, urbanization and fires have decreased the air quality, which poses a respiratory risk to homeless individuals. Climate change and a lack of proper emergency shelters have worsened these problems.

== Responses ==
Over 11 years since 2013, Seattle spent nearly $1 billion on homelessness response programs. Seattle also spent approximately $148 per capita on homelessness in 2022, with the next highest spenders in the region being Bellevue and Tukwila, spending $21 and $25 per capita respectively. Seattle spent nearly six times more per homeless individual than the rest of the country. The City of Seattle 2020 budget directly allocated $80 million for the Division of Homeless Strategy and Investment.

The City of Seattle, King County, and the United Way of King County are the participants in the Seattle and King County Coalition on Homelessness. In April 2021, the voter initiative Charter Amendment Measure 29, known as Compassion Seattle, proposed to amend the Seattle charter adding a clause that requires the municipal administration to allocate at least 12% of its general financial budget to human services. They are combining and coordinating efforts to respond to and end homelessness, while spending carefully. From 2010 to 2020 King County added 67,000 units to the 112,000 lost due to the growth of rental canons which overcome the 80 percent of area median income (about $23,000 per year for a family of four in 2017).

Share/Wheel is a self-help organization run by many homeless residents of Seattle. Share/Wheel has created 4 tent cities through the years. The first Tent City was set up in 1990 at the Goodwill Games. It later became a self-managed homeless shelter at a Metro bus barn. It eventually moved to the Aloha Inn and created a self-managed transitional housing program. Tent City 2 was established on Beacon Hill in what would later become known as The Jungle, against the objections of the City of Seattle. Eviction notices were posted on the tents on July 2. Four days later on July 6, while most of the residents met with City Council member Peter Steinbrueck (who was attempting to delay action against the settlement), the police bulldozed the campsite and private possessions.

Tent City 3 was created on March 31, 2000, on private land. The police did not intervene, but the City of Seattle sued the host over unpaid permit fees. Share/Wheel and the City of Seattle settled out of court with a consent decree after a Superior Court judge warned the City that it would lose the case. Tent City 3 moves from location to location every 60–90 days. Tent City 4 split from Tent City 3 and shifts from place to place on the East side of Lake Washington. Tent cities shelter homeless persons who cannot or do not wish to attend a public shelter for various reasons. The City of Seattle did not approve of these tent cities.

There were other encampments in the Seattle area:

- Nickelsville: formed in 2008 in protest over the policies of Mayor Nickels, who they believed was encouraging the police to assault, injure, and browbeat the homeless. It has no formal connection to Share/Wheel.
- United We Stand: a capacity of 35 people, which split from Tent City 3 in late 2014.
- Camp Unity Eastside: a capacity of 100 people, on the east side of Lake Washington in King County, which split from Tent City 4 in late 2012.

In addition to sanctioned homeless encampments, Seattle philanthropists have also become involved with providing services for the homeless. The Seattle Block Project builds tiny homes in volunteers' backyards to house a single vetted individual. The stated goal of the project is to give people a second chance. The project asks the community to donate space and labor, and is intended to create safety and stability for residents. The Aurora Commons is a private effort to provide services to the homeless on Aurora Avenue North. As of January 2020, more than 5,578 homeless people were living in King County. In 2020 there were recorded 140 nominative deaths among them.

In June 2021, the Seattle City Council approved a plan to use $49 million of the $128 million from federal COVID-19 relief funds to support the city's homeless population. The plan put money towards direct cash assistance and aid programs, housing resources, enhanced shelter and outreach services, and small business recovery.

=== Initiatives ===
==== OSL (formally known as Operation Sack Lunch) ====
OSL (formally known as Operation Sack Lunch) is the largest meal provider in Washington state, currently providing 7,000 no-cost, nutrient-dense, culturally relevant meals a day. These meals are distributed to a wide range of organizations needing nutritional support, including shelters, tiny house villages, permanent supportive housing units, and children's programs. This program began in 1989, and it partnered with the Seattle Human Services Department (HSD) in 1998. In 2012, there was some debate over the program's location, as Seattle Human Services Director Danette Smith said that because of poor conditions under the freeway, where they would distribute meals, it should close or move indoors. The program's operators said it could not continue at all if forced to move indoors. This issue seems to be solved, as of May 2024, the organization moved into its own state-of-the-art kitchen. This organization was also quite impactful during the COVID-19 pandemic. In January 2020, OSL was serving 3,200 meals each day, and by April, per HSD partners request, OSL was producing more than 9,000 meals a day.

==== BLOCK Project ====
The BLOCK project is another initiative that aims to help homeless people in Seattle. This project builds small houses and places of shelter and coordinates with Seattle volunteers who are willing to offer areas of their backyards to place the houses. This is a sustainable, community-based way of addressing the problem of homelessness.

=== Shelters & services ===
Seattle has many shelters dedicated to providing support and housing to individuals and families experiencing homelessness. Some of these shelters are the primary program carried out by the organization, while other non-profits run shelters as one of their many programs aimed at decreasing housing instability. The list below is not comprehensive of all the shelters in Seattle; however, they demonstrate the different types of shelters and services that exist.

==== ROOTS Young Adult Shelter ====
As the largest overnight shelter for youth ages 18–25 in Washington state, ROOTS aims to provide a safe space for young people experiencing housing instability. Located in the University District, ROOTS has a space for 45 young people each night, offering services like support with case management, housing navigation, and employment help. Additionally, youth do not need an ID on their first night.

==== Compass Housing Alliance ====
The organization Compass Housing Alliance has emergency housing programs, along with services that focus on helping individuals and families find permanent housing. Their emergency overnight shelters follow an "enhanced non-congregate shelter model." This means their overnight shelter has 24/7 on-site intensive case management and other support services to remove common barriers to access services. Their shelters include Blaine Veterans Center Enhanced Shelter (downtown Seattle), Otto's Place Men's Shelter (downtown Seattle), and Jan & Peter's Place Women's Shelter (Rainier).

==== Solid Ground ====
The nonprofit Solid Ground provides emergency shelter as well as transitional and permanent housing. It further advocates for the prevention of homelessness for families and individuals. Their temporary housing programs include Broadview: For Domestic Violence (DV) Survivors and Family Shelter. These are not drop-in; rather, families and individuals must contact 2.1.1 for screening eligibility. Solid Ground follows a Housing First philosophy, as their goal is to help people in temporary housing find permanent housing as quickly as possible. They do this by providing additional case management and housing search assistance at each of their shelter locations.

== Income sources ==
Real Change is a newspaper sold by homeless street vendors. Vendors purchase as many papers as they choose for $1.25 each, and sell the papers for the $4 cover price, plus any tips. Real Change has over 300 vendors and results in over $1 million in profits for vendors each year as of 2026.

In 2009, income resources used by homeless persons included 558 homeless persons who received Temporary Assistance for Needy Families (TANF), 481 received Supplemental Security Income (SSI), 355 received general assistance (GAU), 233 had other sources of income, 142 were on general assistance (GAX), 49 received unemployment compensation, 21 received income through the Alcohol and Drug Addiction Treatment Act (ADATSA), and 590 homeless persons had an unknown source of income.

== Statistics ==
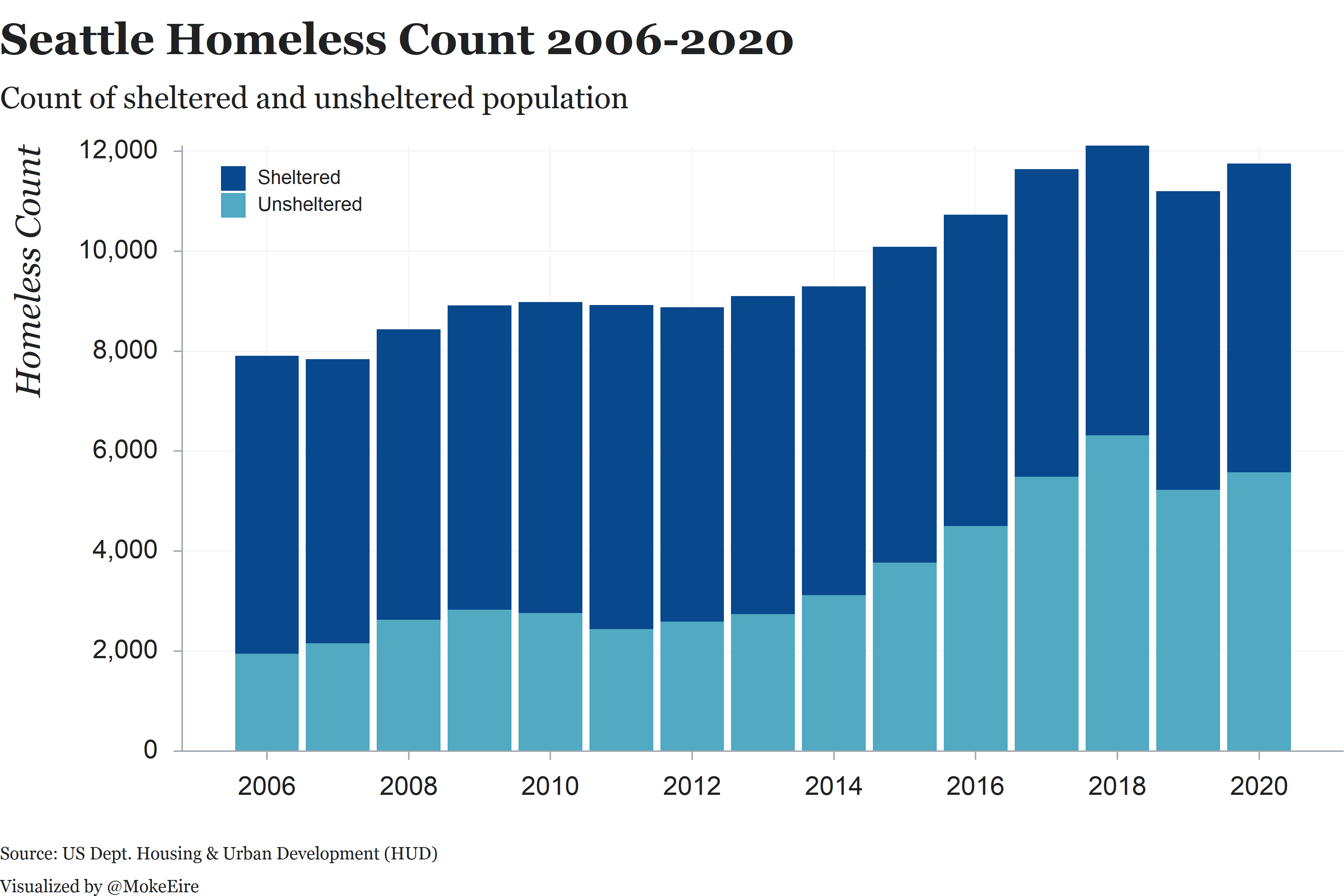

Since 2017, the King County government, with the help of many local organizations, has organized the Point-In-Time Count of the number of people sleeping without adequate shelter in Seattle (around 67% in 2020) and the rest of King County. From 1980 until 2016, the Seattle/King County Coalition on Homelessness (SKCCH) organized an Annual One Night Count of homeless people in ever-expanding areas of Seattle and King County. Since 2006, counts have occurred on one night of the last ten days of January as specified by the US Department of Housing and Urban Development (HUD). Recent street counts have involved over 1,000 volunteers counting people sleeping outside, in a tent, in an abandoned building or in a vehicle (see Unsheltered in the table below). Due to the pandemic, the 2021 street count was cancelled. The counts are not precisely comparable because of changes in the area covered, the time of year, weather conditions during the count, and other factors over the years. When the original reports are missing and surviving records are inconsistent, one count and both citations are recorded in the table. On the same day as the street count, emergency and transitional housing shelters are surveyed to determine how many homeless people are sheltering there. The homeless total includes the unsheltered street count plus those in emergency and transitional shelters (see Total in the table below). From 2006 to 2020, King County population growth averaged 1.7% per year while homelessness grew twice as fast at 3.5% per year and unsheltered homelessness exploded nearly eight times as fast at 13.4% per year.

The total and unsheltered homeless counts since 2006 when HUD compliant January counts began:

Year	Total	Unsheltered	% Unsheltered	Citations
2006	7,910	1,946	25%	
2007	7,902	2,170	28%	
2008	8,501	2,693	32%	
2009	8,952	2,863	32%	
2010	9,022	2,800	31%	
2011	8,972	2,492	28%	
2012	8,899	2,618	29%	
2013	9,106	2,736	30%	
2014	8,949	2,736	31%	
2015	10,122	3,803	38%	
2016	10,730	4,505	42%	
2017	11,643	5,485	47%	
2018	12,112	6,320	52%	
2019	11,199	5,228	47%	
2020	11,751	5,578	47%	
2021	5,183*	--	--	
2022	13,368	7,685	57%	
2023	14,149	7,685	54%	
2024	16,868	9,810	58%	
2025	16,936	9,810	58%	

*Due to the risk of COVID-19 transmission, HUD gave communities the option to cancel or modify the unsheltered portion of their counts. As a result, unsheltered sub-population data is not available and is not included in the total.

In 2023, King County ranked in the top 3 in the United States in the category of the number of homeless people.

== Seattle is Dying documentary ==
In 2019, KOMO-TV aired the hour-long documentary Seattle Is Dying written and reported by Eric Johnson, exploring homelessness in Seattle; Portland sister station KATU also carried the special, which also has issues with a transient population. Johnson said local authorities did not provide effective responses to the problems as he identified them. Several competing media outlets in the city and homelessness advocates criticized KOMO-TV and Johnson for what they said was an inaccurate and biased picture of the issues and also alleged that the contents of the documentary were motivated by the right-wing agenda of the nationwide Sinclair Broadcast Group, which has little interest in local Seattle politics but benefits from sensationalism of local issues to both maintain newscast ratings and to portray a negative and alternate view of the city's politics. Tim Harris of Real Change called it "misery porn".

The documentary states there is a homelessness crisis in Seattle and claims the causes include a lack of an urban social policy and rampant drug use. Johnson advocated for a set of solutions and claimed local officials failed to engage with what he said were documented problems.

KOMO TV said their documentary was effective in influencing Seattle officials. Sinclair station KRCR-TV also carried the special, stating that Shasta County, California officials were taking measures to combat similar issues they face in their region based on the special.

Some advocates for the homeless have argued that the documentary focuses too heavily on issues such as drug use, countering that the high cost of living and lack of affordable housing are at the core of homelessness.

Pete Holmes, the Seattle City Attorney, criticized the documentary, defending the city's efforts on drug crimes and homelessness.

== See also ==
- Homelessness in the United States
- Homelessness in the United States by state
