= Drop-in center =

Service agency

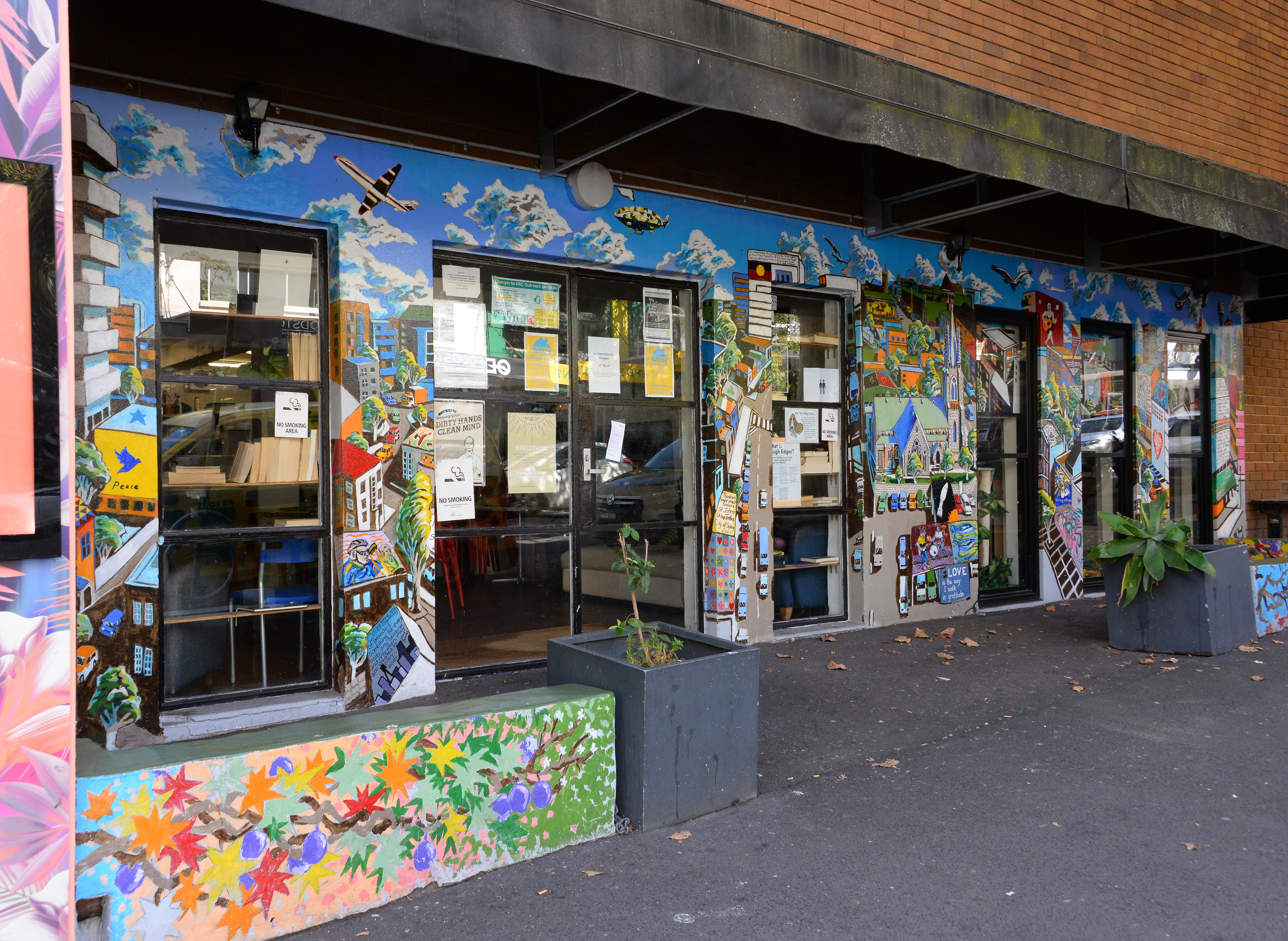
Rough Edges drop-in centre, Darlinghurst, Sydney

A drop-in center is a service agency for either the mentally ill, homeless people, teenagers, and other communities that offers a place where people can go to obtain food and other services. A mental health drop-in center can provide a friendly environment for people who are struggling with mental health symptoms to recover. Also in another case, a drop-in center as opposed to a homeless shelter usually does not provide a temporary residence; rather, it aims to provide other services to endangered or disadvantaged groups in the community, including the homeless, people with addictions, or teenagers. Drop-in centers are usually open during the daytime. Some regular drop-in centers double as warming centers or cooling centers in the winter or summer, and may provide overnight shelter during these months. Many drop-in centers provide free services, and some offer services for a nominal fee.

== See also ==
- Soup kitchen
