= List of libraries in Seattle =

There are many libraries of various types and affiliations in Seattle, a city in Washington state in the United States.

== Organizations which list libraries ==
The Bill & Melinda Gates Foundation does research on libraries and is based in Seattle. They create lists of libraries.

== Libraries in Seattle ==
Library	Affiliation	Type	External link	Notes
American Institute of Architects Library	American Institute of Architects	non-profit organization		
Ames Library	Seattle Pacific University	school		
Arnold Library	Fred Hutchinson Cancer Research Center	research center		
Center for Sex Positive Culture Library	Center for Sex Positive Culture	non-profit organization		
Coast Guard Museum Northwest Library	Coast Guard Museum Northwest	museum		
Cornish College library	Cornish College of the Arts	school		
Dorothy Stimson Bullitt Library	Seattle Art Museum	museum		
Historic Seattle Library	Historic Seattle	non-profit organization		
Frye Art Museum Library	Frye Art Museum	museum		
Gallagher Law Library	University of Washington School of Law	school		
Gordon Ekvall Tracie Music Library	Nordic Heritage Museum	museum		
Group Health Cooperative Medical Library	Group Health Cooperative	research center		
King County Hazardous Waste Library	King County	city		
King County Law Library	King County Courthouse	city		
Lemieux Library	Seattle University	school		
LGBT Library	Gay City Health Project	non-profit organization		
McCaw Foundation Library of Asian Art	Seattle Art Museum	museum		
The Mountaineers Library	The Mountaineers	non-profit organization		
Municipal Research and Services Center Library	Municipal Research and Services Center	non-profit organization		
Museum of History and Industry Library	Museum of History and Industry	museum		
Northwest and Alaska Fisheries Science Centers Library	National Marine Fisheries Service	federal government		
Northeast Seattle Tool Library	Sustainable NE Seattle	tool library		
PNA Tool Library	Phinney Neighborhood Association	tool library		
Harl V. Brackin Library	Museum of Flight	museum		
SE Seattle Tool Library		non-profit organization		
Seattle Architecture Foundation Library	Seattle Architecture Foundation	non-profit organization		
Seattle Children's Hospital Library and Information Commons	Seattle Children's	non-profit organization		
Seattle Public Library		city		
Seattle Municipal Archives		city		
Seattle School of Theology & Psychology library	Seattle School	school		
Temple De Hirsch Sinai Library	Temple De Hirsch Sinai	non-profit organization		
University of Washington Libraries	University of Washington	school		
West Seattle Tool Library	Sustainable West Seattle	tool library		
Walter Johnson Memorial Library	Nordic Heritage Museum	museum		
Washington Talking Book & Braille Library		non-profit organization		
ZAPP	Zine Archive and Publishing Project	non-profit organization		

== See also ==
- Books in the United States
- List of libraries in the United States
