= Horace Chapin Henry =

American businessman

- Born: October 6, 1844; Henry House, Bennington, Vermont
- Died: June 28, 1928 (aged 83); Seattle, Washington
- Occupations: Soldier, railroad builder, banker
- Known for: Henry Art Gallery, Henry Sanitorium (Firland)
- Awards: Legion of Honor

Horace Chapin Henry (October 6, 1844 – June 28, 1928) was an early Seattle businessman and founder of the Henry Art Gallery and Firland Tuberculosis Hospital.

== Biography ==
He was born at the Henry House in Bennington, Vermont, in October, 1844.

He left Norwich Military School (better known as Norwich University) at age 18, serving as a First Sergeant, 14th Vermont Infantry in the Second Vermont Brigade which was in the center of the line repulsing Pickett's Charge at the Battle of Gettysburg in the American Civil War.

After the war he was a partner in Henry & Balch working on railroad construction in the Midwest. He moved to Seattle in 1890 to work on the Northern Pacific Railroad's belt line around Lake Washington, and later the Great Northern Railway's route from Stevens Pass in the Cascade Mountains to Everett on Puget Sound. In 1906 he won a $20 million contract to build 450 miles of the Chicago, Milwaukee & St. Paul line from the Montana-Idaho border across Snoqualmie Pass to Seattle, which was completed in 1909. Seventy-one years after its completion, the Pacific Extension was abandoned by the Milwaukee Road due to bankruptcy.

Henry's 1901 home in the Harvard-Belmont District on Seattle's Capitol Hill was the first of many Victorian, Neo-classical, Colonial Revival, and Tudor Revival houses built in the early part of the century. It is noteworthy for having been built with a five-car garage at a time when automobiles were a novelty in Seattle.

He was president of the Metropolitan Bank and National Bank of Commerce in Seattle, and formed Pacific Creosoting Company on Bainbridge Island in 1906. A tanker which supplied creosote from Europe to this plant was named the H.C. Henry and was sunk by a German submarine in World War I on September 28, 1915.

In 1911, after the death of a son to tuberculosis, he donated land and funds to open Henry Sanatorium in Seattle, later renamed Firland Tuberculosis Hospital.

He was an investor in, and vice president of, the Metropolitan Building Company, which developed the Metropolitan Tract in Seattle. The 11-story Henry Building there was named for him.

For his personal contributions and efforts to collect funds for the Fatherless Children of France, a charity for wartime orphans, he was awarded the Legion of Honor medal in 1920.

He donated his art collection, which he formerly kept at his home and opened to the public for display, to the University of Washington in 1926 and donated the funds to build a new gallery to house the collection, which was to be the Henry Art Gallery.

Henry died in his sleep in his Seattle home on June 28, 1928, and is buried at Lake View Cemetery in Seattle.

=== After his life ===
In 1934, his sons donated land (including his original house) to the city for construction of a library. This was swapped for a smaller parcel closer to the Broadway shopping district, to become the Susan J. Henry branch of the Seattle Public Library, named for his wife. The branch was rebuilt and renamed in 2003 to the Capitol Hill Branch.

The Snoqualmie Pass route was converted to a Rail Trail after Chicago, Milwaukee & St. Paul went bankrupt in 1980. See Iron Horse State Park.

Eagle Harbor was designated a superfund site in 1987 due to pollution from the creosote plant. See Pacific Creosoting Company.
