= Douglass–Truth Branch Library =

Branch of Seattle Public Library, Washington, U.S.

Douglass-Truth Branch Library
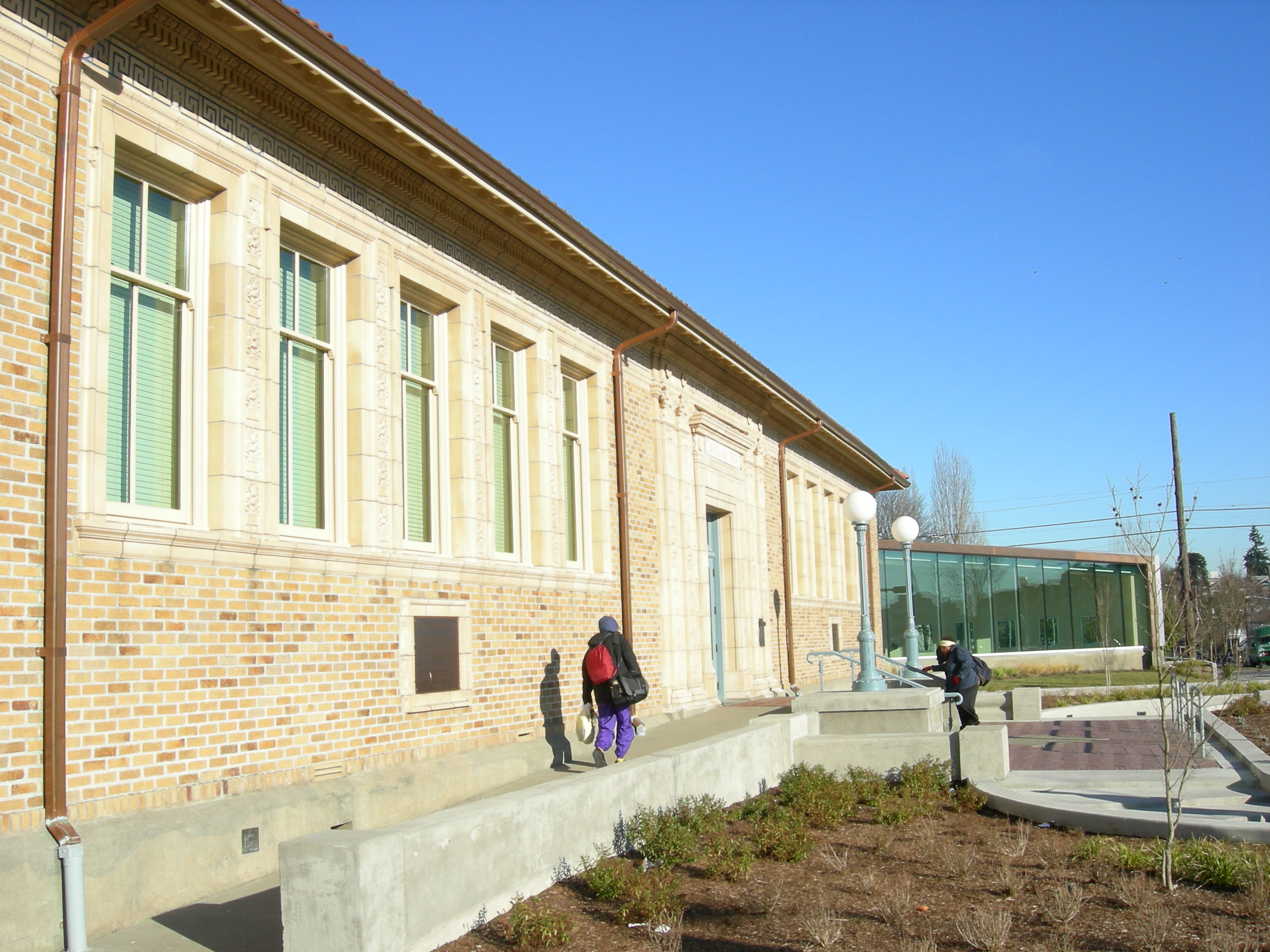
- 47°36′7″N 122°18′6″W
- Location: Seattle, Washington, United States

Other information
- Affiliation: Seattle Public Library
- Website: www.spl.org/hours-and-locations/douglass-truth-branch

Seattle Landmark
- Designated: November 28, 2001

The Douglass-Truth Branch is a library building and Seattle Public Library branch in Seattle, Washington, United States. Originally called Yesler Memorial Library, it was renamed after Frederick Douglass and Sojourner Truth in 1975. The library houses the West Coast's largest collection of African-American literature and history. In 2001, the library was designated a Seattle Historic Landmark by the city.

== Early history and architecture ==
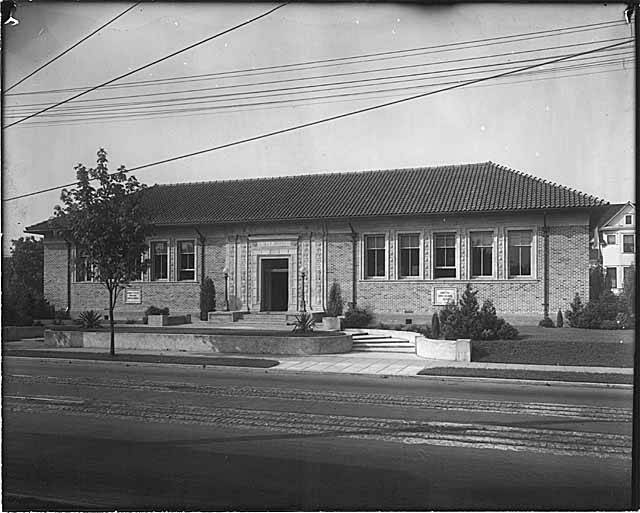
Yesler Branch Library, c. 1916

Former Seattle mayor Henry Yesler and his wife Sarah donated land at 1st Avenue and Yesler Way for the city to build a library. The land was too small to build a library, so the library board sold the land and used the proceeds to purchase a parcel on 23rd Avenue and Yesler Way. Architects Harlan Thomas and Woodruff Marbury Somervell designed the building in an Italian Renaissance style and was covered with buff tapestry brick, terra cotta trimmings, and a roof of red mission brick.

On September 15, 1914, the Henry L. Yesler Memorial Library opened, with mayor Hiram Gill as the guest of honor. The library cost around $40,000 to construct, and it was the only branch at the time paid by city funds and not a gift from Andrew Carnegie.

The library was popular in the area, especially for Jewish immigrants from Eastern Europe and Russia and Japanese immigrants. By the 1930s, the library was home to the library system's Yiddish, Hebrew, and Japanese collections and featured books in 13 languages. The Japanese collection was removed after the Pearl Harbor bombing, and the Yiddish and Hebrew collections were removed in the 1960s.

Through the 1940s and 50s, the library updated its collection to try and accommodate the influx of African Americans who moved into the Central District after World War II.

== African American Collection and renaming ==
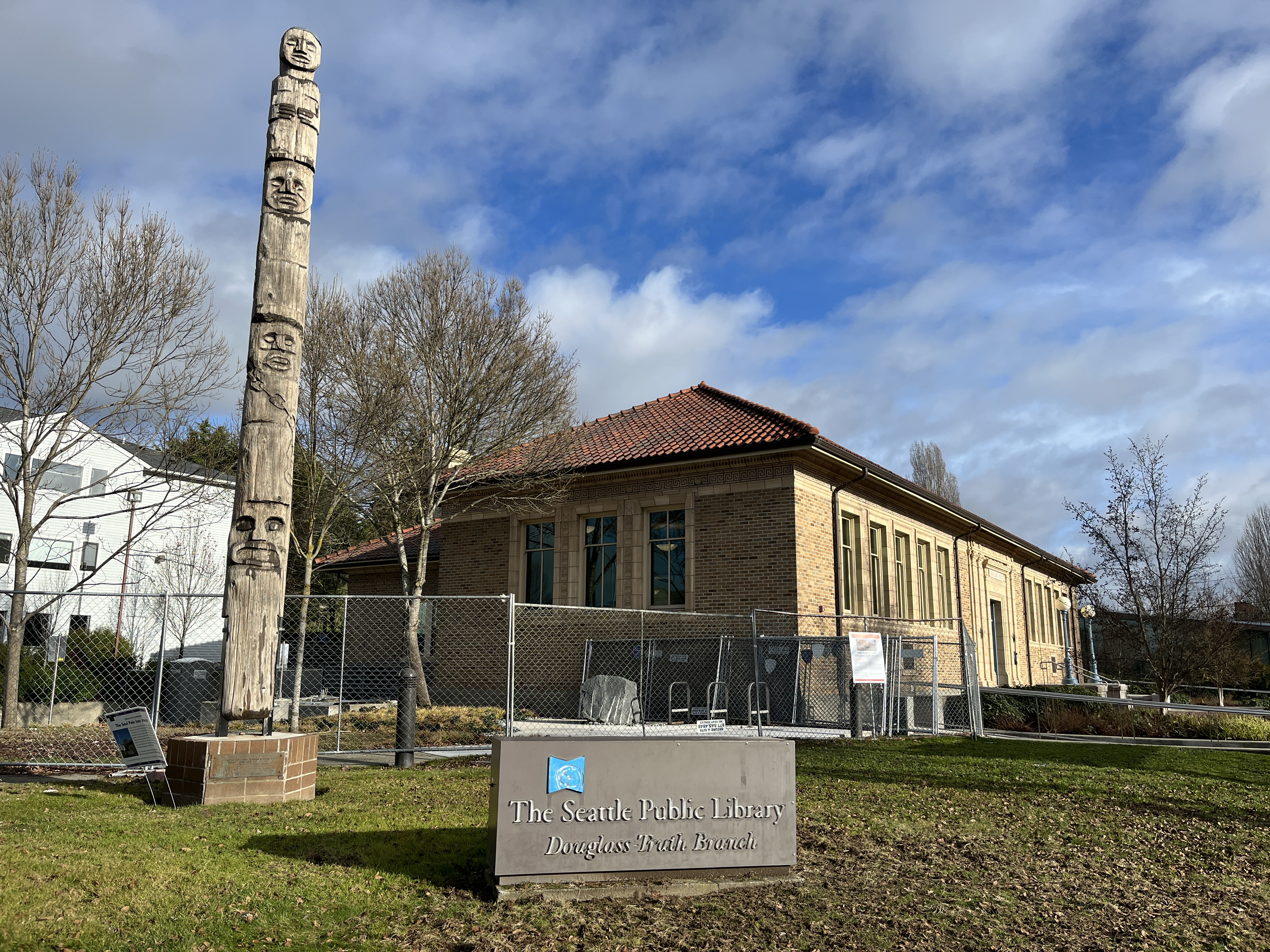
The library's exterior and the Soul Pole in 2022

In the mid-1960s, the central library administration threatened to close the Yesler Library due to declining circulation and turn the library into support for the bookmobile. In 1965, the local chapter of the Alpha Kappa Alpha sorority, Black Friends of the Yesler Library, and community members established the Negro Life and History Collection, now called the African American collection. The community groups collected donations and asked people to donate African American works held in private collections. Council member Sam Smith ensured that $46,000 was appropriated to the collection, and by 1969, a third of the library circulation was African American literature and history.

Today, the collection holds more than 10,000 items, including literature, art, and other historical items.

Soul Pole was donated to the library by the Rotary Boys Club in 1972. The Soul Pole was carved from a telephone pole by members of the Rotary Boys Club in 1969. Its meant to represent 400 years of African American history and injustice.

On December 5, 1975, mayor Wesley C. Uhlman proclaimed that the library was renamed to the Douglass-Truth Branch in honor of Abolitionist leaders Frederick Douglass and Sojourner Truth. The name was chosen because Douglass and Truth received the same number of votes from the community in a contest.

== Renovations ==
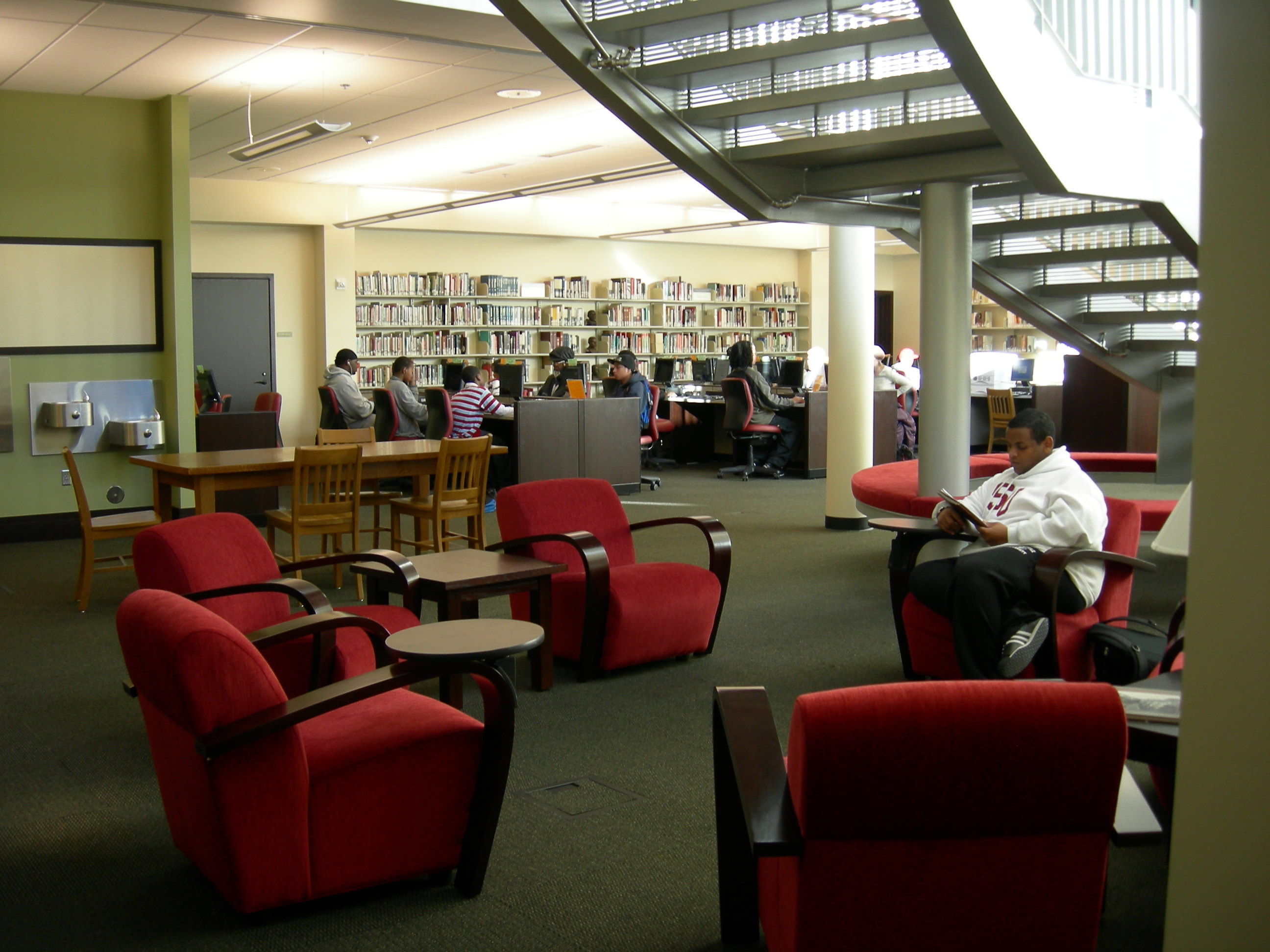
The interior, 2007

In 1987, the Douglass-Truth Branch underwent a $790,000 renovation using funds from a 1984 bond levy.

In 1998, Seattle voters approved the $196.4 million Libraries for All levy to remodel all existing libraries, build an additional five branches and build a new central library. The architect firm Schacht-Aslani Architects produced different designs but focused on not overwhelming the existing library or its architecture. The architects suffered through a "personal battle" in the remodel but made a "heroic effort" to consider all possibilities.

The remodeled library opened on October 14, 2006, costing roughly $6.8 million. The expansion was primarily sub-terrain, with a 7-ton curving steel staircase and a modern glass corridor. The firm also hired a paint archaeologist to locate the exact beige color of the original library.

== See also ==
- List of Seattle landmarks
