= Capitol Hill Branch Library =

Library building in Seattle, Washington, U.S.

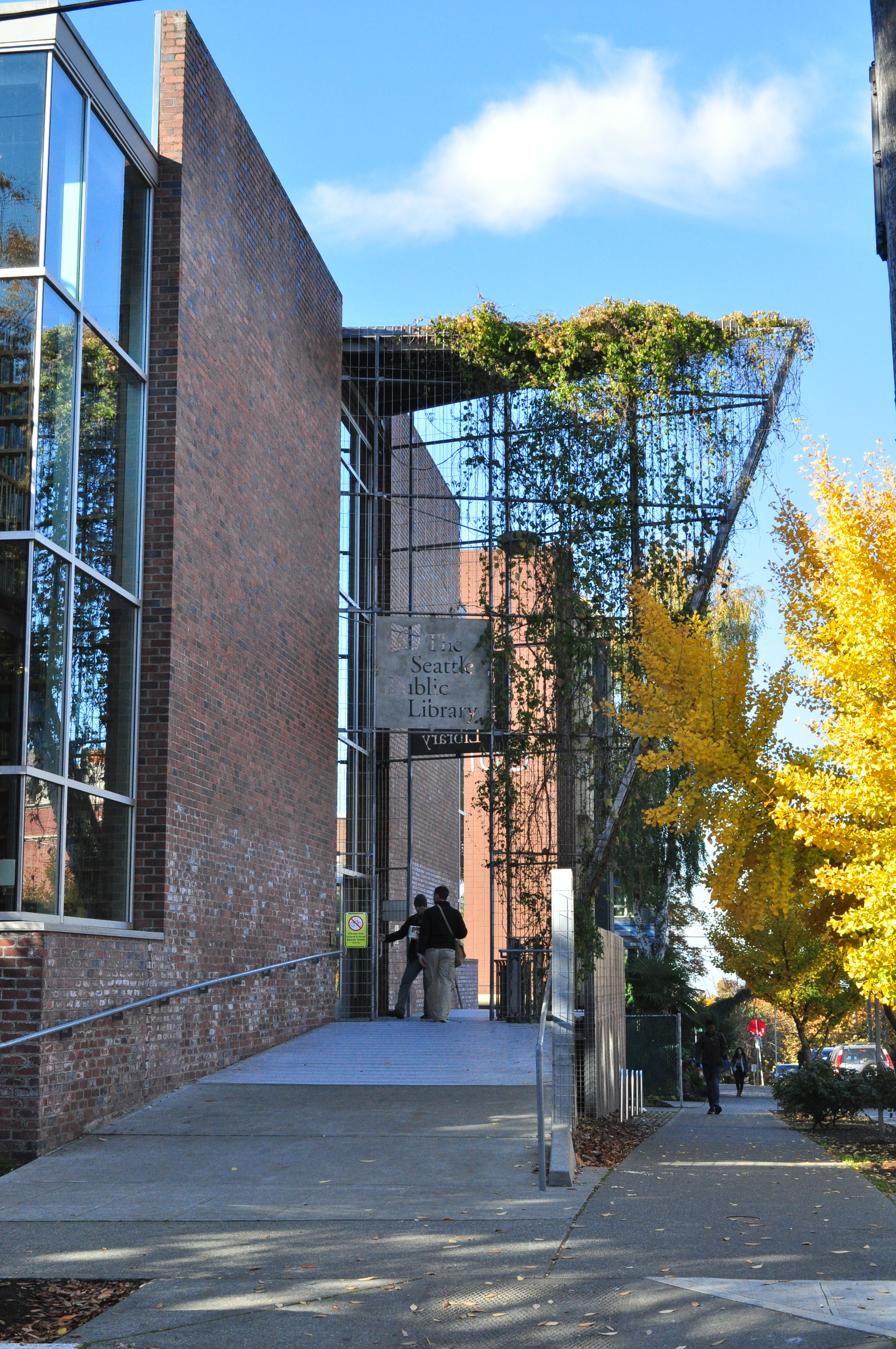
- Capitol Hill Branch exterior and entrance
- Interactive map of the Capitol Hill Branch Library area

General information
- Type: Library
- Location: Capitol Hill, Seattle, Washington, US, 425 Harvard Avenue E.
- Coordinates: 47.6230°N 122.3225°W
- Construction started: November 2001
- Opened: May 31, 2003
- Cost: $5.7 million
- Owner: Seattle Public Library

Technical details
- Size: 40,000 books
- Floor area: 11,615 square feet (1,079.1 m^{2})

Design and construction
- Architects: Johnston Architects and Cutler Architects

Website
- Seattle Public Library

The Capitol Hill Branch is a branch of the Seattle Public Library in the Capitol Hill, Seattle neighborhood of Seattle, Washington, US. The original library, located at Harvard Avenue and Republican Street, opened in 1954 and was named the Susan J. Henry Branch at the request of its benefactor. The Henry Branch was demolished in 2001 and the modern Capitol Hill Branch was opened at the same location in 2003.

== History ==
The original site of the library was formerly Emma Baillargeon Stimson's large home, whose purchase was partly funded by the sale of another Capitol Hill property donated in 1934 to the city by two sons of Horace Chapin Henry and Susan J. Henry. Both Henry and Stimson families were early Seattle businesspeople and philanthropists, and Emma Stimson was granddaughter of John Collins, another wealthy businessperson and one of the first mayors of Seattle. A new building designed by NBBJ opened as the Susan J. Henry Branch on August 26, 1954. The Washington Talking Book & Braille Library (then the Library for the Blind and serving Washington, Montana and Alaska) was housed in the building's basement until 1973.

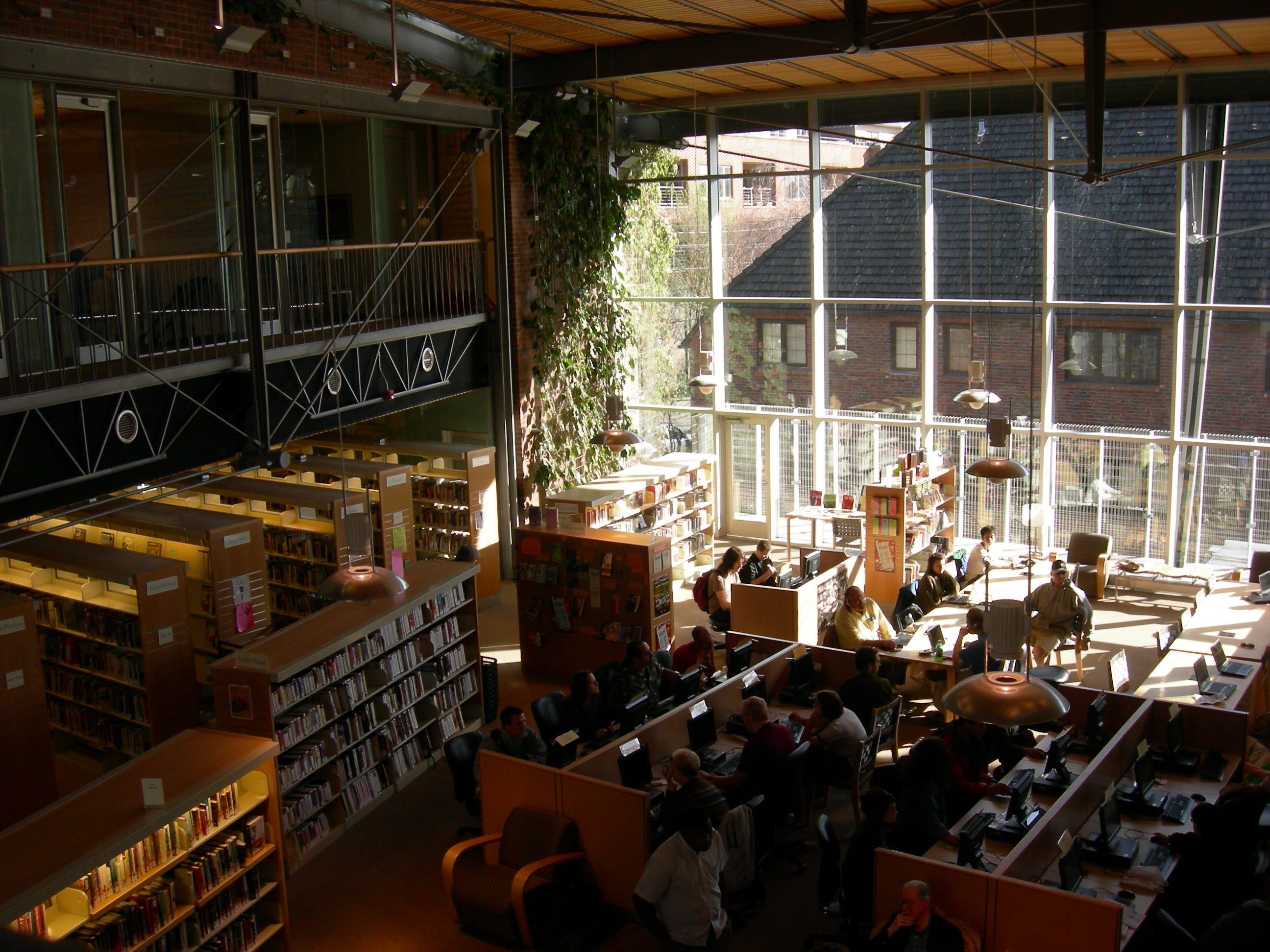
Unobstructed reading room and mezzanine, featuring two story south-facing glass wall

The citywide "Libraries for All" initiative was approved by voters in 1998, funding the replacement of older and smaller libraries, including the Henry Branch. In October 1999, after two public meetings, the Seattle Library Board voted to build a new branch on the current site of the Henry Branch. The Library Board rejected an offer from a private developer that sought to put the new library branch in a mixed-use development at Broadway and 10th Avenue East, after public opposition to the 65-foot (20 m) height of the building. The Henry Branch closed on November 3, 2001, and was demolished. A new $5 million building designed by Cutler Anderson Architects opened on the same site on May 31, 2003. Under city regulations, new libraries could not be named for individuals so it was named Capitol Hill Branch. In its first year, the new library handled 58 percent more patrons compared to the old branch.

== Architecture and construction ==
The 21st-century building incorporates a green wall on a steel mesh trellis and other calming features visible from the unobstructed interior with large glass expanses and south light. The exterior mortar joints are trowel struck to give the exterior a monolithic appearance. The basement has an 18-stall parking garage.

The design team, led by Ray Johnston and James Cutler, described the building as a reflection of the urban corridor of Broadway as well as the wooded residential areas of the neighborhood.
