= High Point Branch Library =

Seattle Public Library branch in the U.S. state of Washington

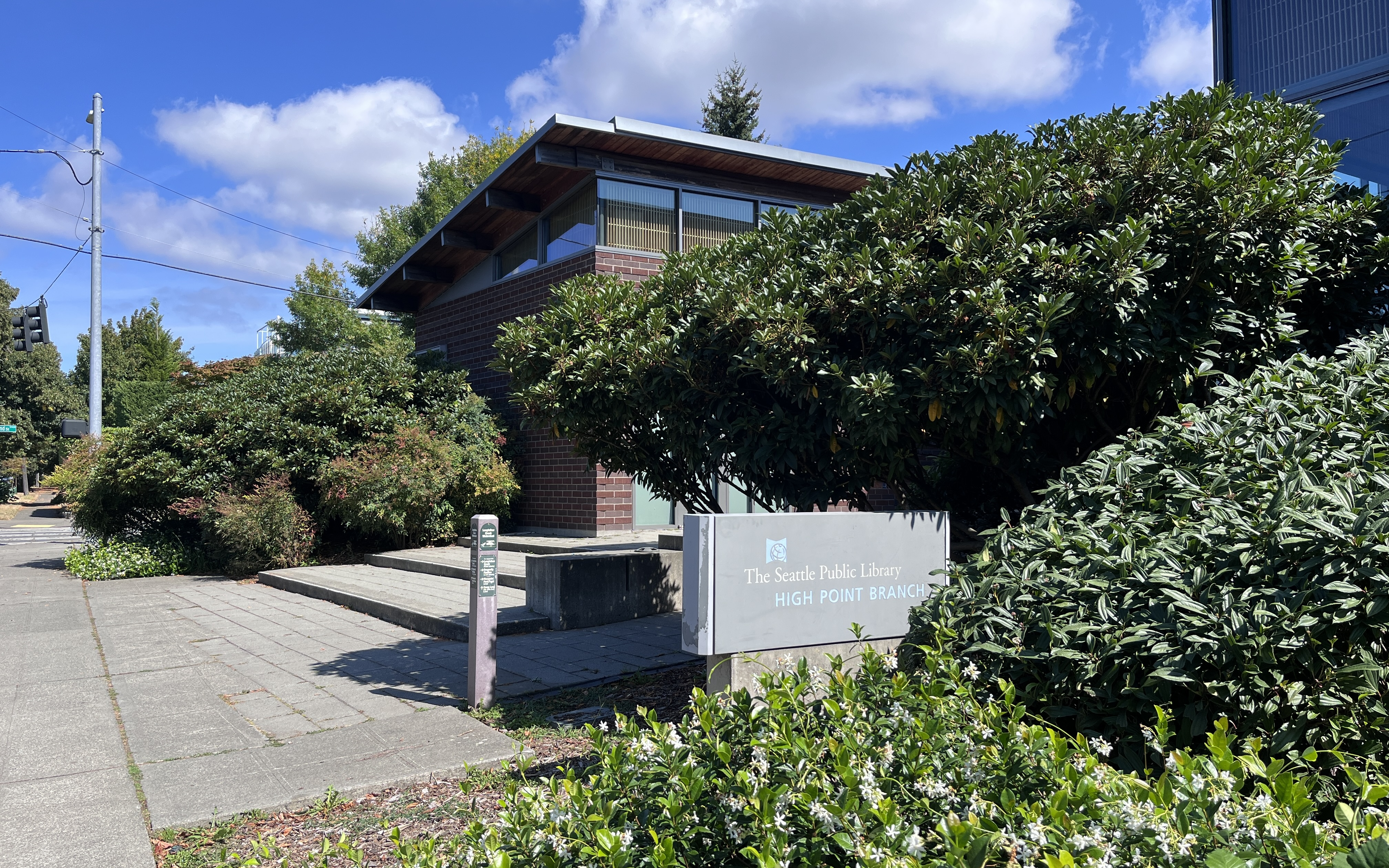
- The library's exterior, 2026
- Interactive map of the High Point Branch Library area

General information
- Coordinates: 47.5481°N 122.3759°W

High Point Branch Library is a library building and Seattle Public Library branch in High Point, West Seattle, Washington, United States. The branch was established on November 3, 1942. It has operated from its current building since June 19, 2004.
