= Henry House (Bennington, Vermont) =

Historic house in Vermont, United States

- William Henry House
- U.S. National Register of Historic Places
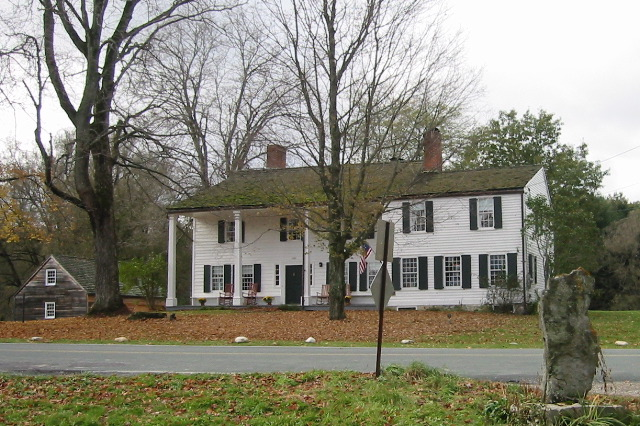

- Location within Vermont Location within the United States
- Location: 1338 Murphy Rd., Bennington, Vermont
- Coordinates: 42°54′30″N 73°15′20″W
- Area: 10 acres (4.0 ha)
- Built: 1769
- Architectural style: Georgian
- NRHP reference No.: 88001302
- Added to NRHP: November 9, 1988

The Henry House, also known as William Henry House, is a historic house at 1338 Murphy Road in Bennington, Vermont. Built in 1769 and extensively reworked in 1798, it is one of Vermont's oldest surviving houses, and an important example of evolutionary architecture in the state during the 18th century. Now a wedding and events venue, it was listed on the National Register of Historic Places in 1988.

== Description and history ==
The Henry House is located outside the village of North Bennington, Vermont, on the south side of the Walloomsac River, just south of the Burt Henry Covered Bridge. It is set on 25 acres (10 ha) of meadow, maple and pine. The main block of the house is a 2 1/2-story wood-frame structure, with gabled roof and clapboard siding. Extending to the north and rear are ells, one of which appears to be a porch that was enclosed at a relatively early date. A two-story porch extends across the east side, supported by massive square posts. The interior of the main block has nearly intact finishes, including flooring, woodwork, door hinges and other hardware, although some parts were recycled from other old buildings during a 1930s restoration.

The house was built in 1769 for Elnathan Hubbell, and was extensively altered for William Henry about 1797. The Henrys were prominent in the settlement and politics of southwestern Vermont for many years, with Henry's son William Henry representing the state in the United States Congress. The house was built just eight years after settlement began in the area, and is one of the state's oldest surviving buildings. The fact that it was altered in the 18th century is also important, as it provides a window into changing construction methods.

It was the birthplace of Horace Chapin Henry, an early Seattle businessman.

The house is now operated as The Henry House, a wedding and events venue.

== See also ==
- National Register of Historic Places listings in Bennington County, Vermont
- List of the oldest buildings in Vermont
