= International District / Chinatown Branch Library =

Seattle Public Library branch in the U.S. state of Washington

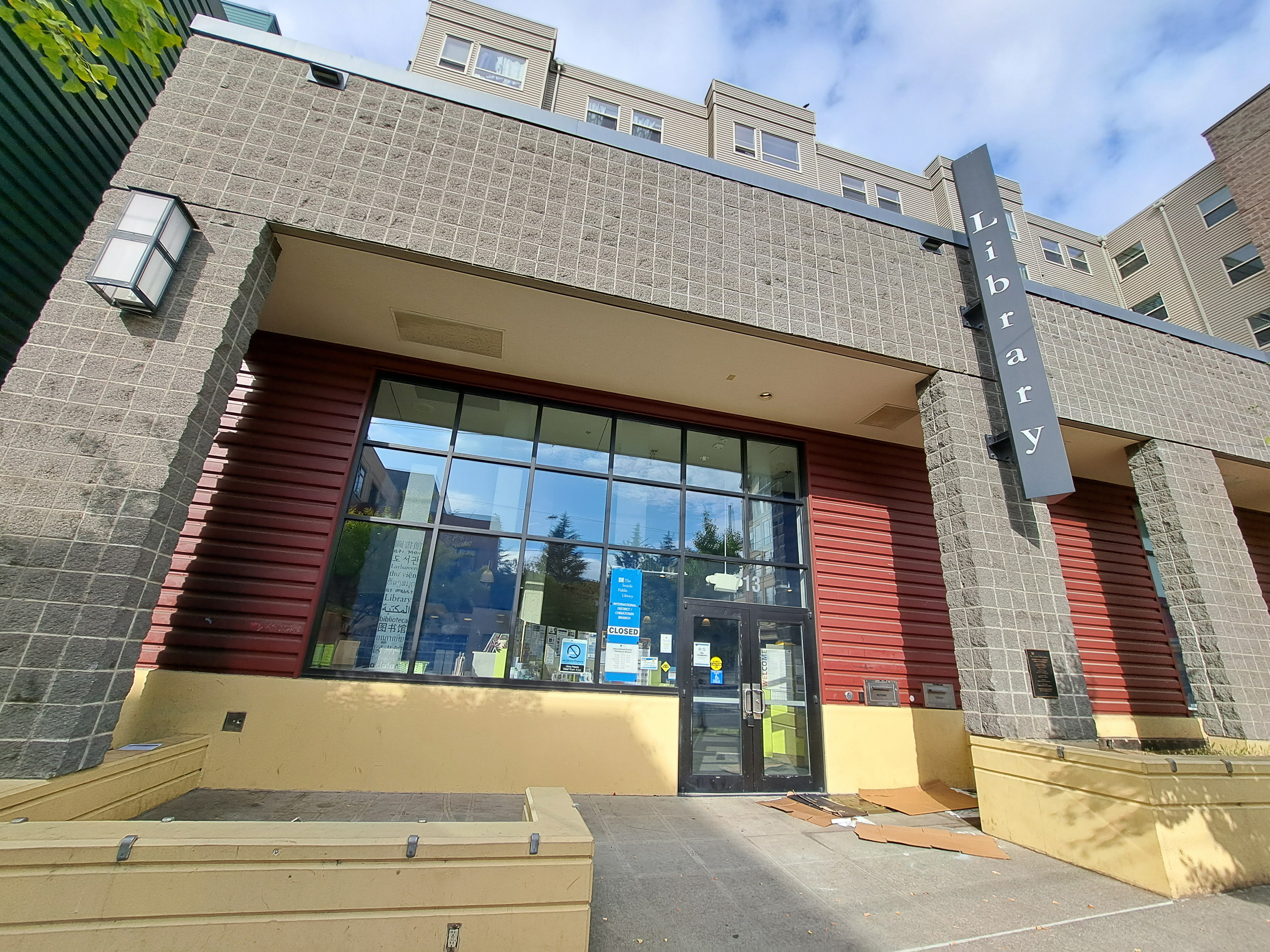
- The building's exterior
- Interactive map of the International District / Chinatown Branch Library area

General information
- Location: 713 8th Avenue South, Seattle, Washington, United States
- Coordinates: 47.5962°N 122.3228°W

The International District / Chinatown Branch Library is located in Seattle's Chinatown–International District, in the U.S. state of Washington. It is part of Seattle Public Library, and opened in the International District Village Square development in 2005. The library has hosted classes for learning English in preparation for U.S. citizenship. In the summer of 2026 the library was closed for 11 weeks due to odor and dead rats, and reopened on July 30th.
