= Soul Pole =

Totem pole in Seattle, Washington, U.S.

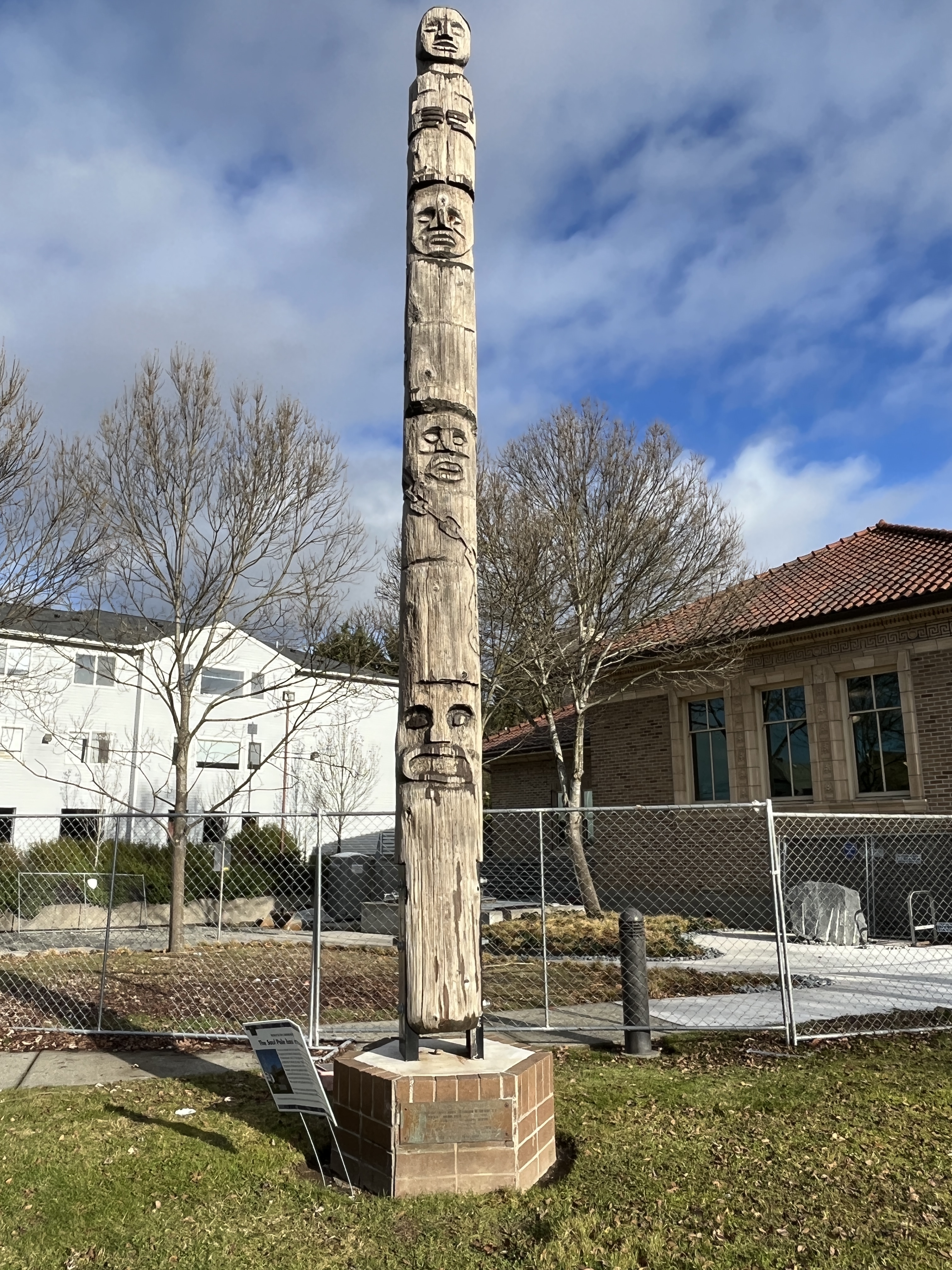
- The totem pole in 2022
- Location: Seattle, Washington, U.S.
- 47°36′6.7″N 122°18′7.9″W

Soul Pole is a totem pole installed outside Seattle's Douglass–Truth Branch Library, in the U.S. state of Washington.

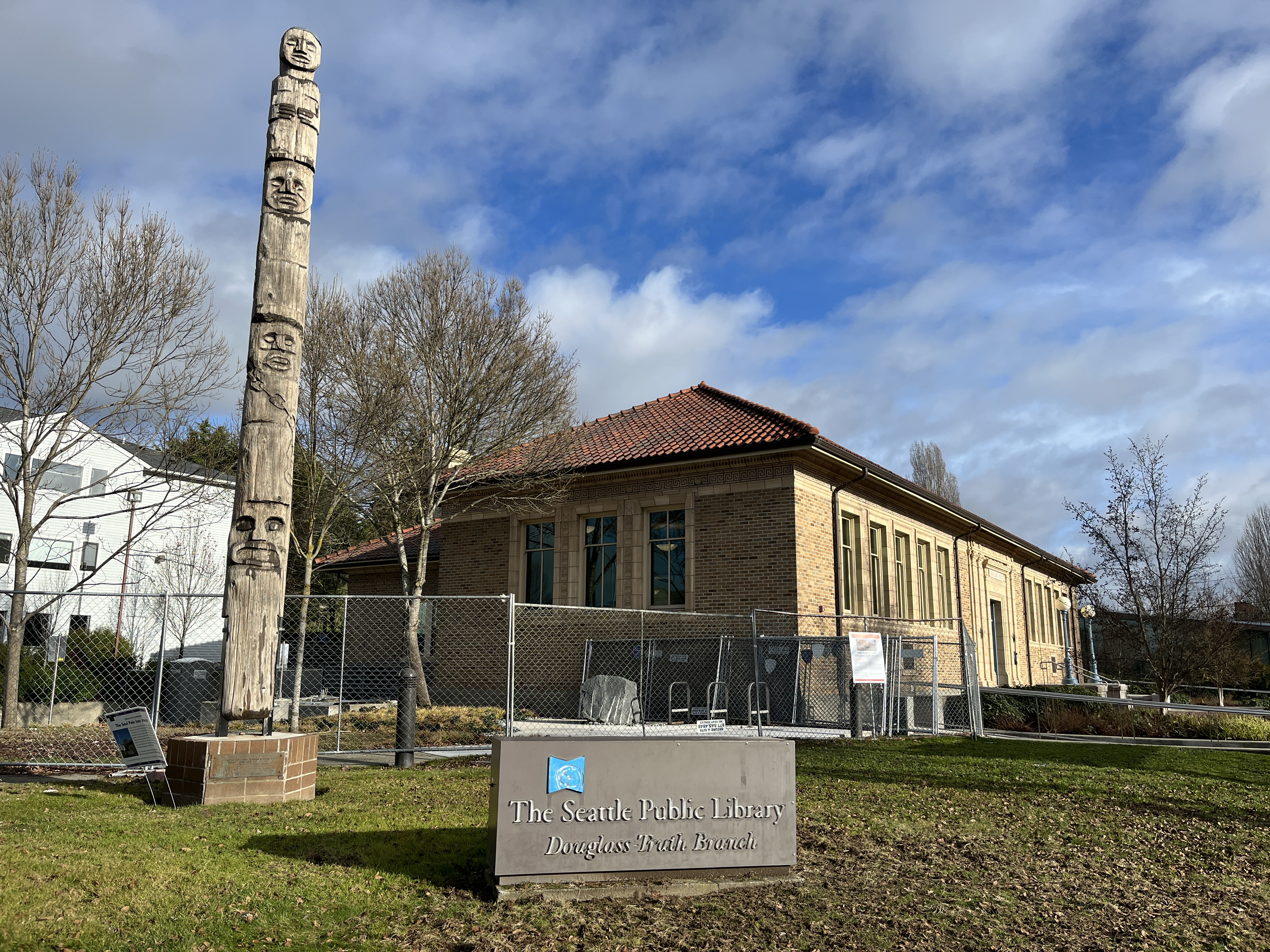

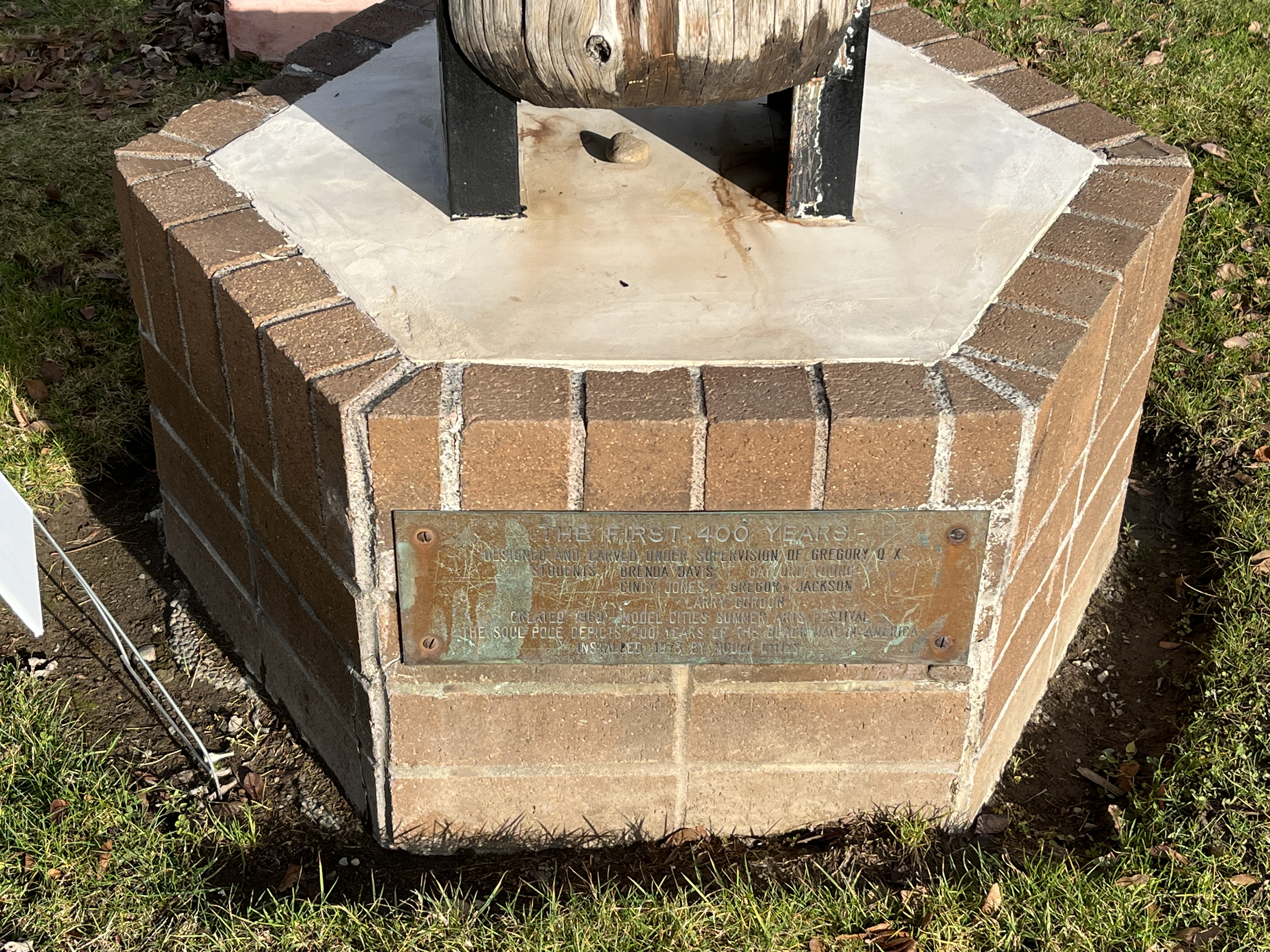
Plaque
