= Municipal Research and Services Center =

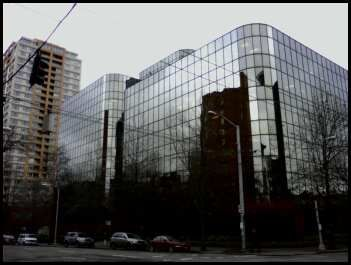
- MRSC's headquarters in Seattle's Belltown neighborhood.
- Abbreviation: MRSC
- Formation: 1934
- Type: Municipal Research and Consulting
- Headquarters: 2601 4th Avenue
- Location: Seattle
- Executive Director: Tracy Burrows
- Website: http://www.mrsc.org

The Municipal Research and Services Center (MRSC) is a non-profit organization based in Tacoma with a mission of supporting effective local government in Washington with research support. Founded in 1934 and funded primarily through a state appropriation, most of MRSC's services are offered free of charge to local government employees and public officials of cities, counties, and some special purpose districts in the State of Washington. MRSC's expertise covers Washington state municipal law, municipal finance, urban planning, public works, procurement and public management.

== History ==
=== 1930s – 1960s ===
MRSC was established on July 1, 1934 as the Bureau of Governmental Research. Housed at the University of Washington's Department of Political Science. It was originally created as the research arm of the Association of Washington Cities with the purpose of “work[ing] in conjunction with the officials of the Association in providing better information through greater research facilities, all in the interest of better and more economical municipal operations and services.”. AWC hired Russell Barthell, the Executive Secretary of the City Club of Portland at the time, as its first full-time employee.

In 1939 the Bureau split from AWC. Ronald H. Webster, a lawyer who was serving as the chief counsel and legal adviser for the Washington State Tax Commission, was brought on to lead the organization, a role he filled until 1967. In 1945, Webster secured permanent funding for the organization from the State government through the passage of House Bill 213. The law established the Bureau as the official research and services agency for cities and towns in Washington State, a relationship it maintains today through RCW 43.110.030.

From its inception through the 1960s the Bureau was responsible for hosting the annual Institute of Government. This multi-day conference held at the University of Washington was initially designed as an “in-service training school” for public officials in Washington, consisting of intensive training on municipal law, taxation, budget preparation, accounting, and personnel administration. However, by 1940 the Institute had morphed into a general conference on emerging municipal issues, or as some called it, the “20th Century version of the ‘ole Town Hall meeting’". Opening to the public it gained much wider popularity, attracting over 1,000 attendees in 1949. The event was discontinued after the Bureau's relationship with the University ended in 1969.

=== 1970s - 1980s ===
In 1969, the State developed a new arrangement whereby the Bureau of Governmental Research at the University of Washington was dissolved. In its place an independent nonprofit called the Municipal Research and Services Center of Washington (MRSC) was created and contracted with the State's newly formed Municipal Research Council. As part of this new contract MRSC established a research library as a resource for local government public servants. As of 2011 it contained 12,000 books and subscribed to 300 periodicals. With its broader role and tighter relationship with the state, the 1970s were a large growth period for MRSC, with research requests tripling to over 3,000 annually.

=== 1990s – Present ===
In response to the passage of the Growth Management Act in 1990, MRSC expanded its services including consulting on planning and development, publishing a series of handbooks on planning in partnership with the State's Department of Community Development, making itself available to Washington county employees and officials, and contracting to serve some special purpose districts including water and sewer districts, public hospital districts, and transit districts. In 2002, MRSC started the MRSC Rosters program, a statewide small works and consultant roster system that currently hosts rosters for over 350 municipalities.

== Services ==
=== Research and Legal Requests ===
MRSC's core service is answering questions and providing research support to its customers (which include city, county, and some special purpose district staff and officials). Half of MRSC's staff consultants are municipal lawyers while the other half are experts in various areas of municipal governance including management, public works, finance, and planning. Requests range dramatically from clarification of a state or local law, to information and examples regarding new types of policies. In 2008 MRSC responded to over 7,000 research requests. The majority of these requests were from smaller cities and counties.

=== MRSC Website and Web Library ===
MRSC's website is another one of its main services. MRSC consultants maintain over 350 webpages on various municipal subjects that contain key information, news, and resources. From the 2000s, MRSC began to make its research library resources available online. The website provides access to the largest collection of municipal documents in the state, including ordinances, RFPs, staff memos, job descriptions, budgets, and more.

=== Guidance and Training ===
MRSC produces a number of popular publications for city and county officials. These include, Knowing the Territory, a handbook of basic legal guidelines for newly elected officials, the annual Budget Suggestions, the Bidding Book for cities and counties, and Contracting for Services, a guide to professional, personal, and purchased services contracting. In conjunction with the State and the Association of Washington Cities, MRSC also produces the City Officials Directory, a catalog of all elected officials and key staff in Washington State cities.

=== MRSC Rosters ===
Started in 2007, MRSC Rosters is a small public works and consultant roster membership service. As a shared roster database for municipalities, the program aims to provide a more efficient, and cost-effective solution to maintaining public works rosters, especially for smaller jurisdictions. As of 2015 the program had 415 participating municipalities.

=== Professional Association Support ===
MRSC contracts with various professional associations in Washington State to provide administrative, accounting, registration, and website support. Currently MRSC provides this support to five associations:

- Washington City/County Managers Association (WCMA)
- Washington State Association of Municipal Attorneys (WSAMA)
- Washington Finance Officers Association (WFOA)
- Washington Municipal Treasurers Association (WMTA)
- American Public Works Association Washington Chapter (APWA-WA)
