= Seattle Architecture Foundation =

Non-profit organization based in Seattle

The Seattle Architecture Foundation (SAF) is a non-profit, 501(c)(3) organization based in Seattle, Washington, United States. Its mission is to increase public awareness of architecture and organize events and exhibitions. The organization offers walking tours in Seattle that showcase historic and modern buildings. It is governed by a board of directors, with programs funded by donors and implemented by volunteers.

== See also ==
- Architecture of Seattle
