= Seattle Public Library =

Municipal library system of Seattle, Washington, U.S.

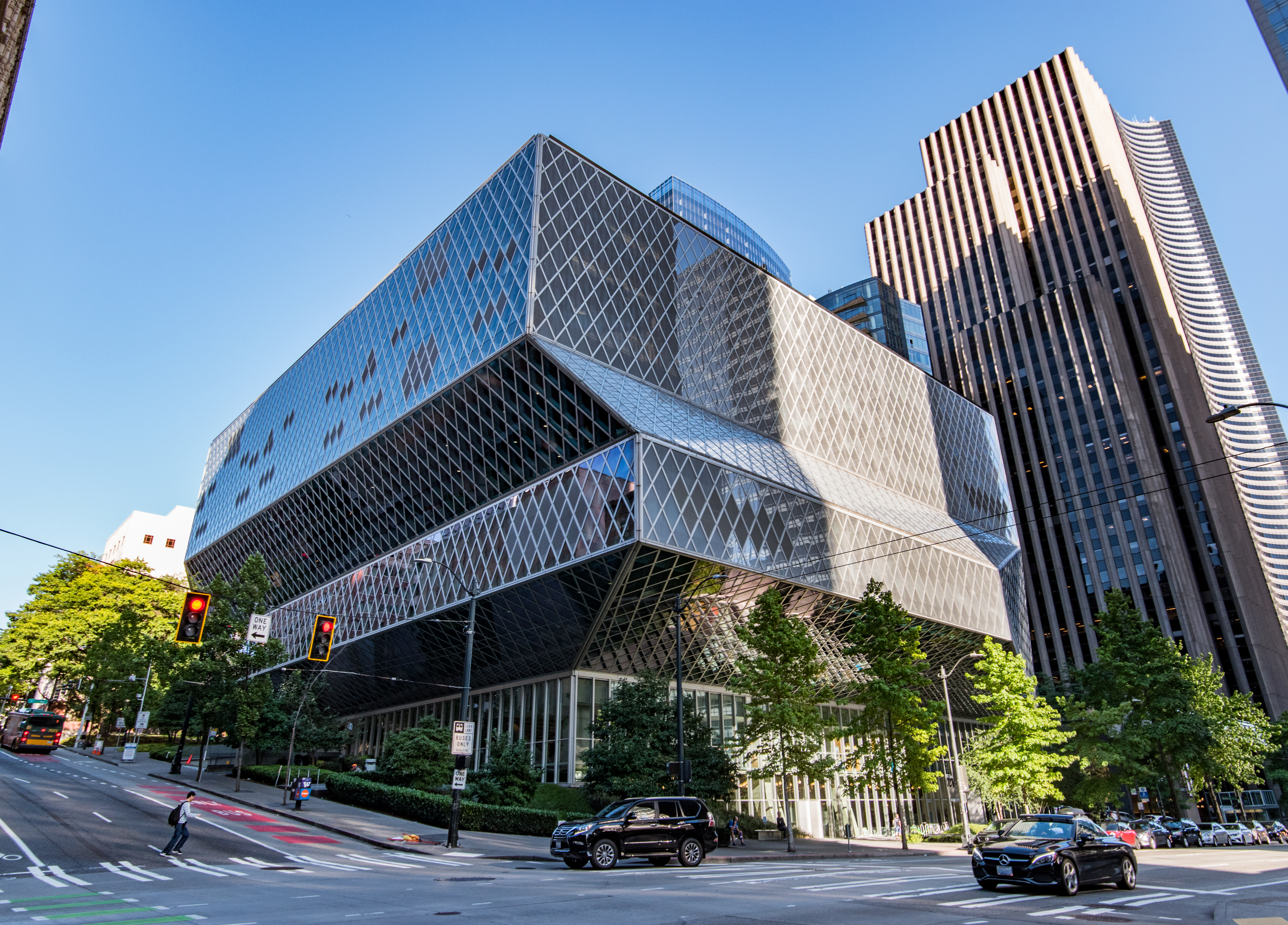
- Seattle Central Library in 2019
- 47°36′25″N 122°19′58″W
- Location: Seattle, Washington, U.S.
- Type: Public library
- Established: 1890
- Branches: 27

Collection
- Size: 2.8 million (2023)

Access and use
- Circulation: 13.4 million (2023)
- Members: 293,000 active patrons (2023)

Other information
- Budget: $93.9 million (2023)
- Director: Tom Fay (Executive Director and Chief Librarian since 2022)
- Employees: 675 (part- and full-time) as of 2023
- Website: spl.org
- ASN: 21525
- References: The Seattle Public Library's 2023 Statistical & Financial Summaries

The Seattle Public Library (SPL) is the public library system serving the city of Seattle, Washington. Efforts to start a Seattle library had commenced as early as 1868, with the system eventually being established by the city in 1890. The system currently comprises 27 branches, most of which are named after the neighborhoods in which they are located. The Seattle Public Library also includes Mobile Services and the Central Library, which was designed by Rem Koolhaas and opened in 2004. The Seattle Public Library also founded the Washington Talking Book & Braille Library (WTBBL), which it administered until July 2008.

All but one of Seattle's early purpose-built libraries were Carnegie libraries. Although the central Carnegie library has since been replaced twice, all the purpose-built branches from the early 20th century survive; however, some have undergone significant alterations. Ballard's former Carnegie library has since housed a number of restaurants and antique stores among other enterprises, while others such as the Fremont and Green Lake branches have been modernized and remain in use as libraries.

As of 2023, the library served 293,000 active patrons, 75,000 new cardholders, 124,000 borrowers of physical materials, and 175,000 borrowers of digital materials. The library answered 234,000 assisted information questions, and it hosted 3,500 classes, events and activities, as well as 341,000 public computer sessions.

== Branches ==
The Seattle Public Library system consists of 27 branches including the Central Library; it also provides a mobile library system.

- Ballard
- Beacon Hill
- Broadview
- Capitol Hill
- Columbia (in Columbia City)
- Delridge
- Douglass–Truth (named after Frederick Douglass and Sojourner Truth) in the Central District
- Fremont
- Green Lake
- Greenwood
- High Point
- International District/Chinatown
- Lake City
- Madrona–Sally Goldmark
- Magnolia
- Montlake
- North East in View Ridge
- Northgate
- NewHolly
- Queen Anne
- Rainier Beach
- Southwest in Westwood
- South Park
- University in the University District
- Wallingford
- West Seattle

== Collections and services ==
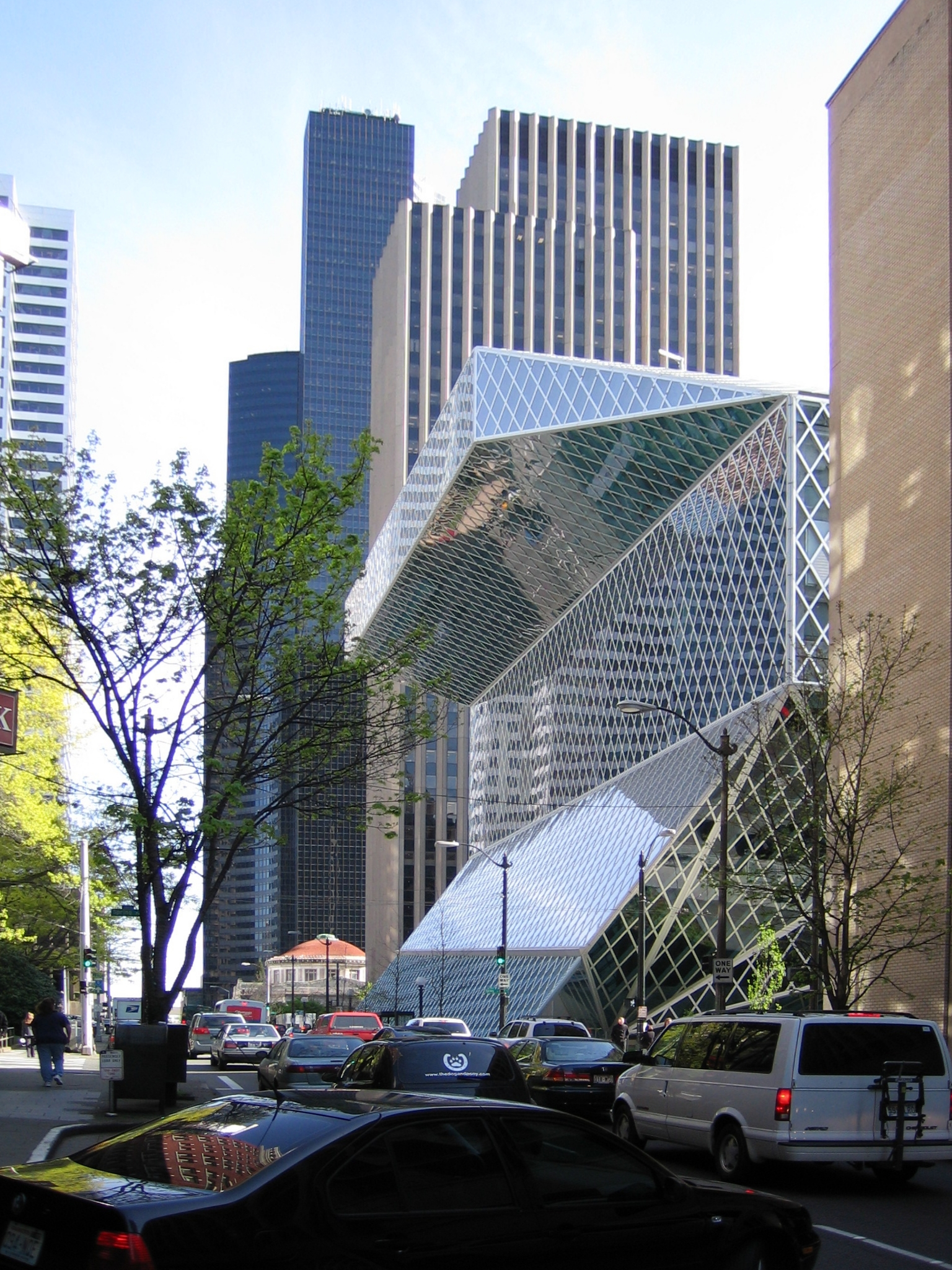
Central Library, looking south on Fifth Avenue

As of 2023, the Seattle Public Library contained 1.8 million physical items, with 1 million at the Central Library and 814,000 catalogued at the other 26 branches. The total physical collection includes 4.7 million printed books and other printed items; 1.2 million CDs, DVDs, and audiobooks; and 42,000 other items, including laptops, tablets, Wi-Fi hotspots, and Kill A Watt power meters.

As of 2011, its special collections include an oral history collection, the state document depository, the federal document depository, an aviation history collection, genealogy records, and historical documents about Seattle. A room on the seventh floor of the Central Library houses the ZAPP Zine Collection, over 30,000 zines donated by Richard Hugo House, where it used to constitute the Zine Archive and Publishing Project collection. In addition all locations have uncatalogued collections of books that can be borrowed without a library card.

The library also has extensive online resources, which as of 2023 include, among other things, access to historic archives of The Seattle Times, the Seattle Post-Intelligencer, Seattle Daily Journal of Commerce, and The New York Times, as well as the Britannica Library, Kanopy (video streaming), and ProQuest (academic research), plus access to several e-book collections. In 2023, the library circulated 7.4 million digital items, including 5.5 million e-book and e-audiobooks. Through Books Unbanned, these online resources are available to youth ages 13 to 21 throughout the United States. SPL also offers free admission to 13 local museums, zoos, and other attractions that are reserved online.

== History ==
=== Late 19th century: founding ===
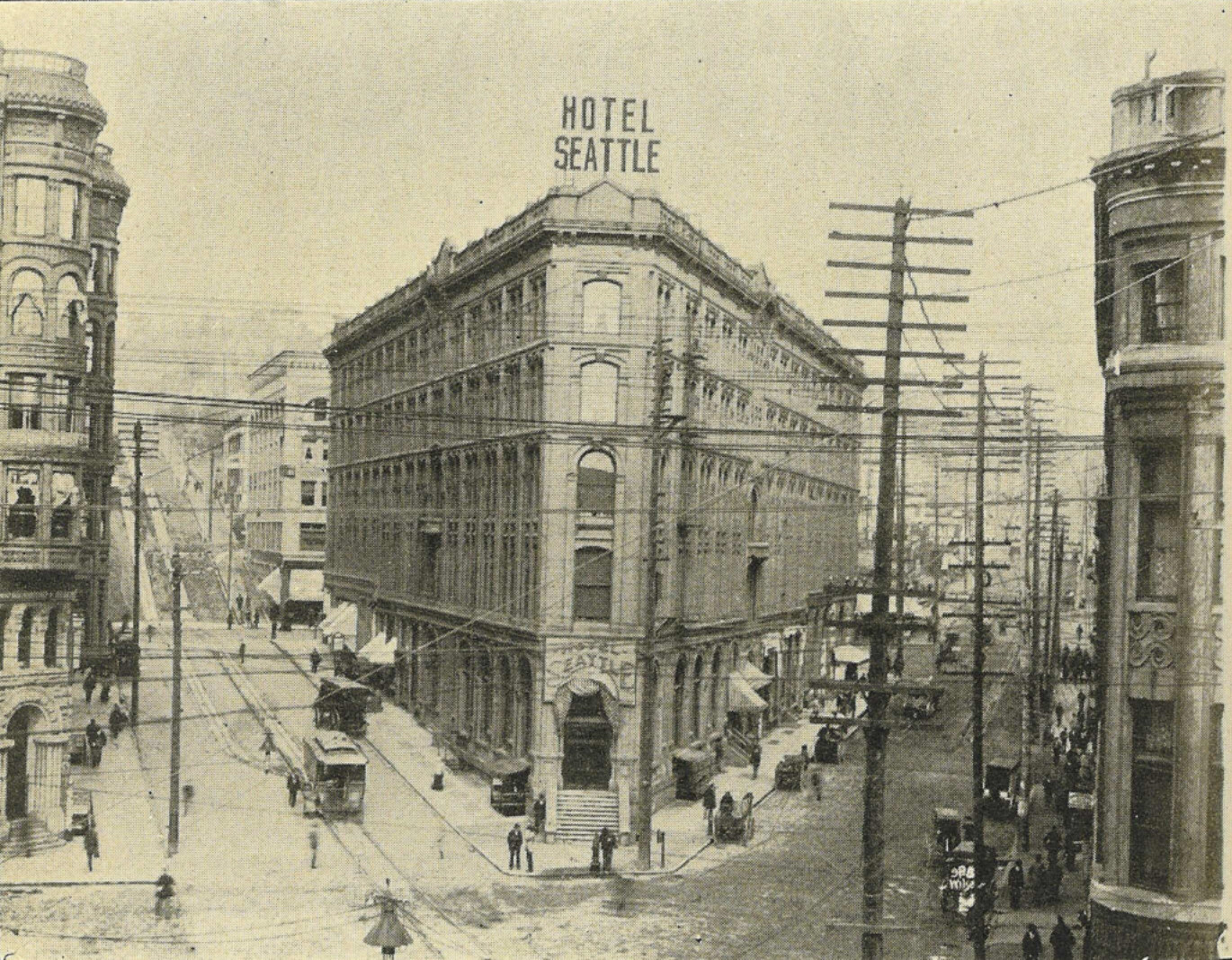
The Occidental Block in 1900; to its rear left is a corner of the Collins Block, still standing as of 2008

Seattle's first attempt to start a library association occurred at a meeting of 50 residents on July 30, 1868, but produced only minimal success over the next two decades. The Ladies' Library Association began a more focused attempt to put together a public library in 1888. They had raised some funds and had even obtained a pledge of land from Henry Yesler, but their efforts were cut short by the Great Seattle Fire of 1889. Nonetheless, encouraged by their ideas, the revised October 1890 city charter formally established the Public Library as a branch of the city government. The ladies' influence can be seen in that the charter required that at least two of the five library commissioners be women. The library was funded by a 10% share of city fines, penalties, and licenses.

The first library opened April 8, 1891 as a reading room on the third floor of the Occidental Block—later the Seattle Hotel—supervised by librarian A. J. Snoke. By December 1891 when books were first allowed to be borrowed, it had 6,541 volumes. Snoke was succeeded in 1893 by John D. Atkinson, who was succeeded in 1895 by Charles Wesley Smith, who remained in the position until 1907. Smith took over a library that, like all of Seattle, had been seriously impacted by the Panic of 1893: by 1895 its annual budget was only half of what it had been that first year.

In its first decade or so, the growing library "developed the traveling habit". In June 1894, it moved across Second Avenue to the Collins Block. By 1895, the budget situation was so dire that Smith initially experimented with charging borrowers ten cents to borrow a book; the experiment was a failure and in 1896 the library moved to the Rialto, a building farther north on Second Avenue, far enough north that at that time it stood outside of Seattle's core. As the city grew out, that building was later occupied by the Frederick and Nelson department store. At the Rialto, the library for the first time moved to an open-stacks policy, where users could browse through the shelves for themselves instead of presenting a request to a librarian. In 1898 the library moved again to the former Yesler Mansion, a forty-room building on the site that would later become the King County Courthouse.

Meanwhile, in 1896, the library established a bindery, and a new city charter drastically decreased the power of the library commission and removed the requirement of its having female members. This greatly increased Smith's power, a change which he himself opposed; in 1902 a new Library Board would be established, again gaining supervisory rather than merely advisory power.

=== Early 20th century: the first great era of growth ===
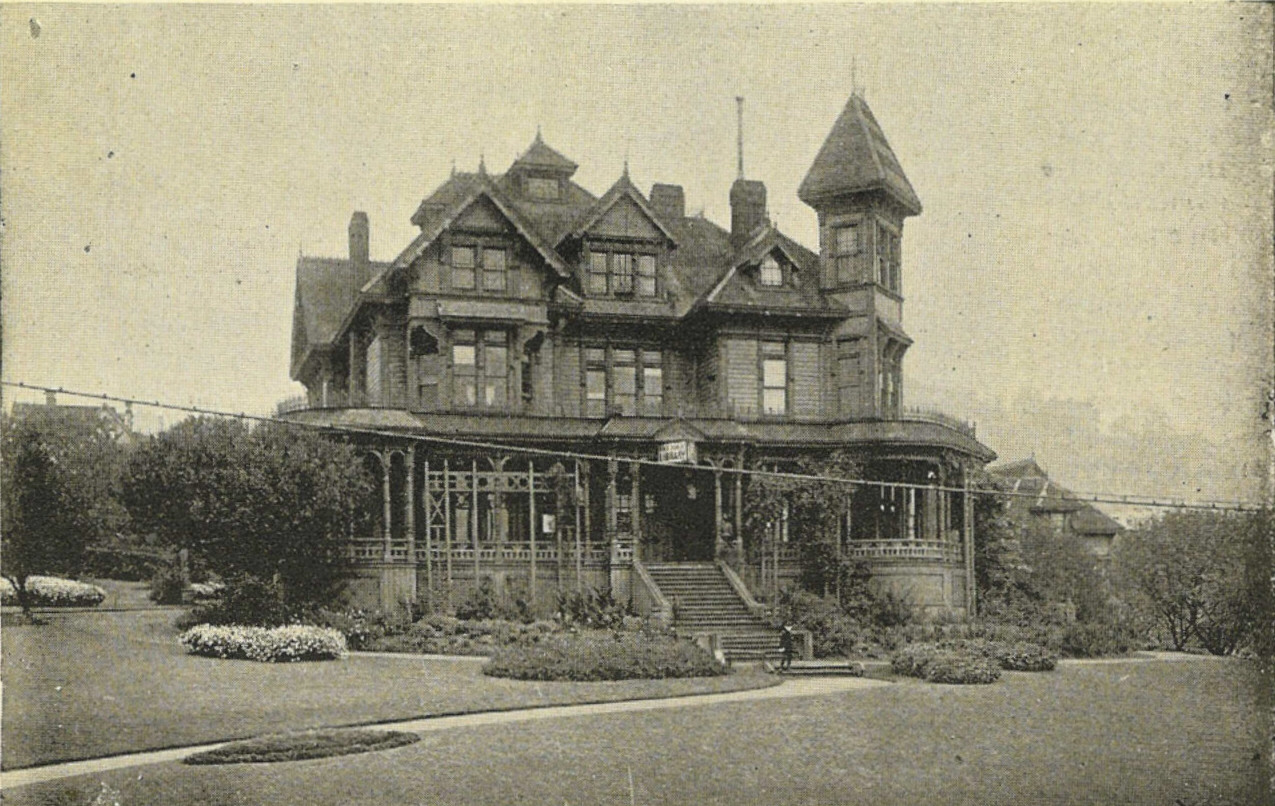
The public library in Henry Yesler's former home downtown at Third and James, burned on the night of January 1–January 2, 1901

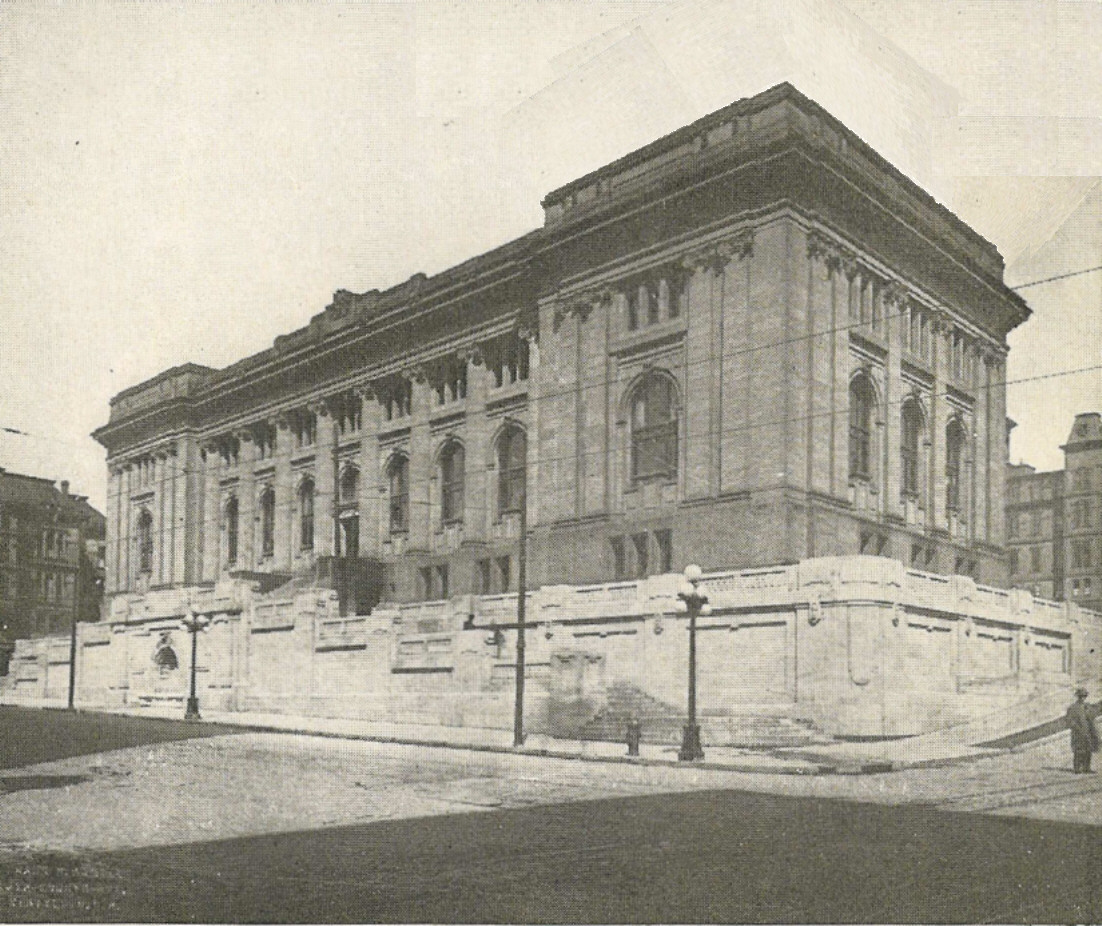
The downtown Carnegie Library as it appeared in 1919

On the night of January 1, 1901, the Yesler Mansion burned taking most of the library collection with it. The library records were salvaged, along with the 2,000 volumes of the children's collection. Other than those, though, practically the only books salvaged were the 5,000 that were out on circulation at the time. The library operated for a time out of Yesler's barn, which had survived, then moved to a building that had been left behind when the University of Washington had moved from downtown to its present campus. By January 6, Andrew Carnegie had promised $200,000 to build a new Seattle library; he later added another $20,000 when this budget proved inadequate.

The new Carnegie library was built not far from the former university campus, occupying the entire block between 4th and 5th Avenues and between Madison and Spring Streets. The land was purchased for $100,000. In August 1903, the city selected a design submitted by P. J. Weber of Chicago for a building to be constructed largely of sandstone. Ground was broken in spring 1905 and the library was dedicated December 19, 1906. Shortly after moving to these new permanent quarters, Smith was succeeded in 1907 by Judson T. Jennings.

Meanwhile, the library began to grow in other respects. A reference department had been established in 1899. In 1903 a position was established for a children's librarian. In 1904 a plan was established to grow eventually to 12 departments. The periodical division was established in 1906, the art division in 1907, and the technology division in 1912. Branch libraries had opened in rented quarters in Fremont (1903), Green Lake (1905), and the University District (1908). In 1908, Carnegie donated $105,000 to build permanent branches in the University District, Green Lake, and West Seattle (all of which opened in summer 1910). The annexation by Seattle of the city of Ballard brought with it another already established Carnegie library, and a further Carnegie donation of $70,000 in 1911 built the Queen Anne branch (opened 1914) and the Columbia Branch (opened December 31, 1915 in Columbia City). The land in the Central District donated by Henry Yesler to the Ladies' Library Association was traded to the parks department and the money was city funds were used to buy land and erect a library about 1 mile (1.6 km) east of downtown and named after Yesler. It was later renamed as the Douglass–Truth Branch Library.

The 1921 opening of the permanent Fremont branch—also funded with Carnegie money—brought this era of great expansion to an end. It would be over three decades before The Seattle Public Library opened another proper branch.

Even as early as 1915, the library was collecting books not only in English but in many other languages spoken in Seattle (though all of the languages collected at that time were European: there were as yet no Asian language collections). In 1915, the library had collections in Croatian, "Dano-Norwegian" (Bokmål), Finnish, French, German, Italian, Lithuanian, Modern Greek, Russian, Spanish, Swedish, and Yiddish. Ten other languages were also lightly represented. Seattle also had established one of only three collections for the blind in the country west of the Mississippi River, the other two being in San Francisco and Portland, Oregon. In 1915 this collection had 698 volumes.

In 1916, 67,097 people borrowed books from the library. That was 19 per cent of the population of the city. At that time the system appears to have had more total points of contact with the public than today, though few of these were proper branches. A civics textbook from the era indicates the library's points of contact with the public as "the central library, 9 branch libraries, 8 drug store deposit stations, 32 fire-engine houses, 420 school rooms in 77 schools, 3 play grounds and 8 special deposit stations."

=== Mid 20th century stagnation ===
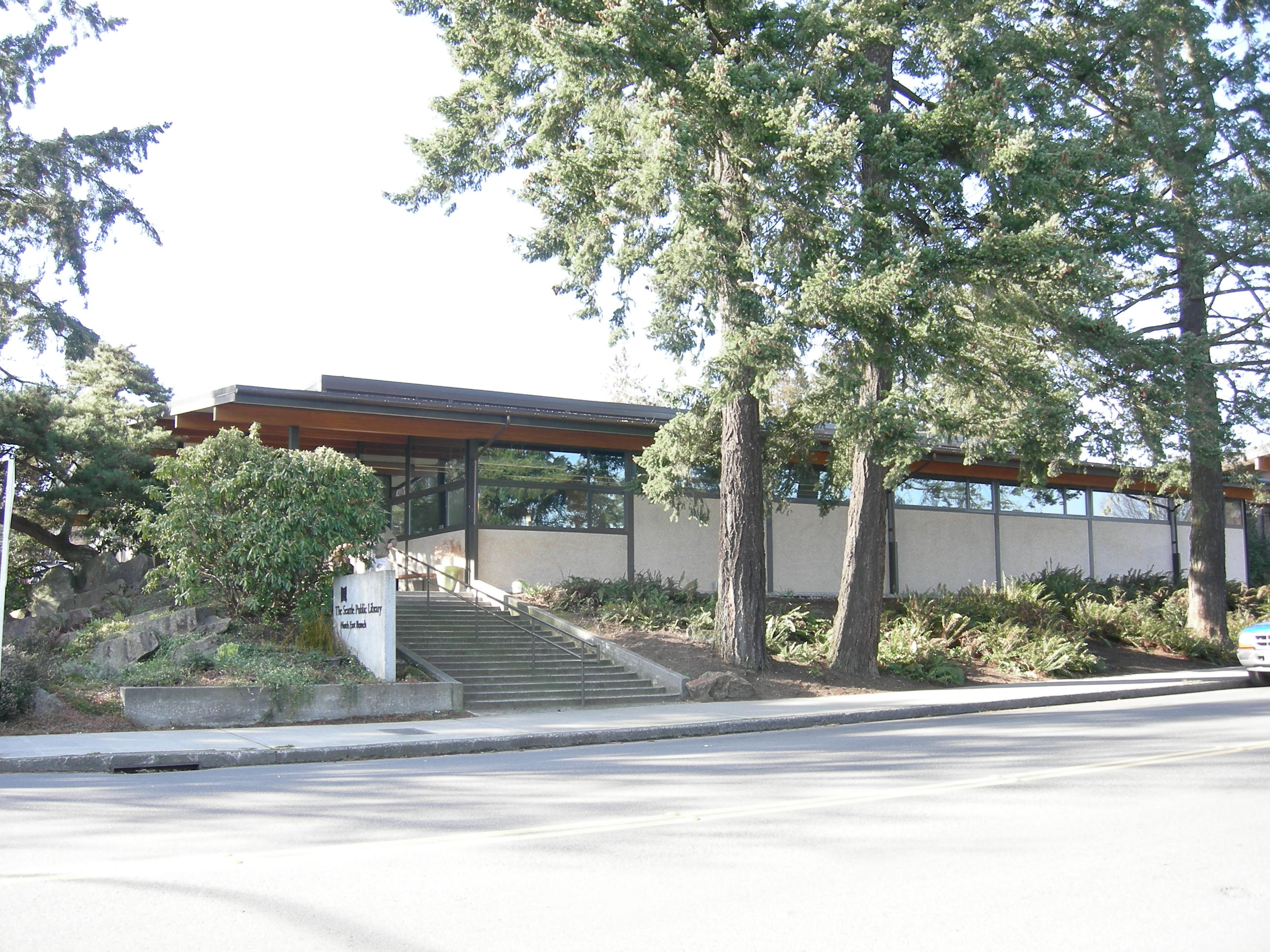
The Paul Thiry-designed North East branch (opened 1954) stood in sharp architectural contrast to the older branch libraries.

Seattle suffered heavily in the Great Depression. The Library's official website describes the Library as having been "pummeled" in this period of "soaring demands and evaporating resources". In 1930, a 10-year-plan announced an "urgent" need for a $1.2 million bond issue to expand the Central Library. In the event, nothing of the sort happened. During the Depression, the Central Library became a refuge for the jobless. Library circulation hit record heights, passing 4 million in 1932. Meanwhile, budgets were cut, employees were laid off, and programs were terminated. The Library's 1939 budget was $40,000 less than its 1931 budget.

The Library's 50th anniversary in 1941 occasioned the foundation of Friends of The Seattle Public Library. The economic revival brought about by World War II, and the post-war prosperity, began to bring the library out of its institutional stagnation. Seattle spent $400,000 on a book stack addition to the Central Library in 1949, and three modern new branch libraries were built in 1954. Nonetheless, the library was simply not used nearly as much in this era as in the Depression years. While the city's population had grown from 368,000 to 463,000 since 1932, only 2.4 million books were being borrowed annually, as against over 4 million. Bond issue votes to build a more modern central library failed in 1950 and 1952.

At mid-century, The Seattle Public Library had numerous "book stations" for areas with no branch as such, in locations such as a "rented shop space, clubhouse, or hospital," each with a small, frequently changing collection of books. These book stations were open half-time, and serves one-sixth as many readers as the branch libraries. A bookmobile with 2,500 books serviced two dozen other locations. Also, at this time The Seattle Public Library was a mainstay of the King County Library System (then known as the King County Rural Library District), with 70,000 book loans in 1948 to King County patrons outside the city.

By mid-century, The Seattle Public Library circulated a lot more than books. Even in its early years, the library collection had included items such as sheet music. By 1948, the circulating collection included 3,500 phonograph records, which were borrowed a total of 53,000 times that year, as well as 6,000 pieces of sheet music, 6,000 song books and piano albums, 200 reproductions of famous paintings, and 27,000 other pictures. In 1950, the library subscribed to 200 newspapers (mostly from Washington State) and 1,700 periodicals.

=== The 1960s ===
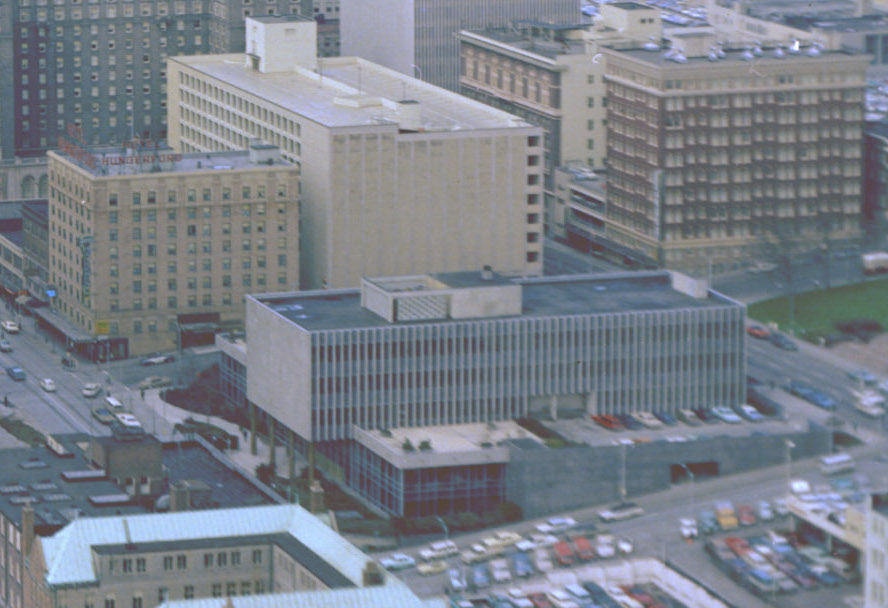
The Bindon and Wright downtown library (just below center), photographed here in 1969

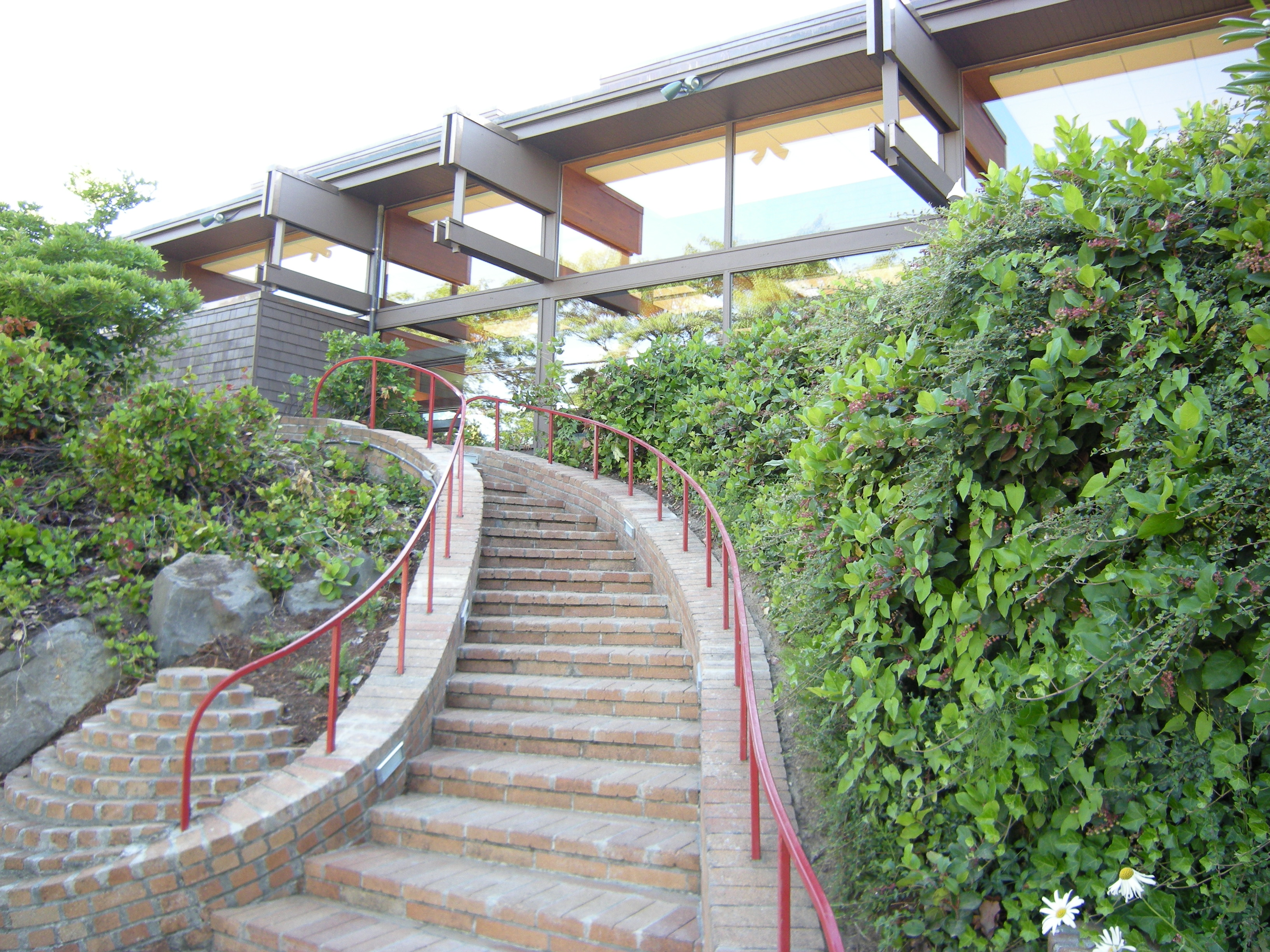
Stairs lead up through a garden to the Magnolia library

The city finally passed its first-ever library bond issue in 1956. This funded, among other things, a new $4.5 million, 206,000-square-foot (19,100 m^{2}) central library, designed in the International style by the Seattle firm of Bindon & Wright, and built on the same site as its Carnegie predecessor. Dedicated March 26, 1960, it featured the first-ever escalator in an American library, a drive-up window for book pick-ups and was Seattle's first public building to incorporate significant new works of art. Among the artists represented were James FitzGerald, Glen Alps, and Ray Jensen. It also incorporated a fountain by sculptor George Tsutakawa, the first of many fountains Tsutakawa would construct over the remainder of his career.

The new library energized the public library system. The library's official web site writes that "the atmosphere in the opening weeks was likened to a department store during the holiday shopping season. The new Central Library loaned out almost 1 million volumes in its first nine months, a 31 percent increase over the previous year's circulation." A library that had been "struggling with disinterest in a shabby headquarters" now found itself "loved to tatters," with greater demand than it could readily satisfy.

The 1956 bond issue also provided $500,000 for branch libraries. This paid for the construction of the Southwest Branch (1961), a new Ballard Branch (1963; later Abraxus Books), and the Magnolia Branch (1964). The Magnolia Branch was designed by Paul Hayden Kirk and incorporates the Japanese influences found in much Northwest architecture of the era. The bond issue also bought the land for the Broadview Branch, but did not provide the funds to build it; that branch finally opened in 1976.

=== Late 20th century: Recession and recovery ===
In the 1970s and into the 1980s, The Seattle Public Library experienced another period of tight budgets and constricted services, but the picture was never as bleak as in the Great Depression. In 1975 the Yesler Branch—earlier in danger of closing—was renamed as the Douglass-Truth Branch, honoring Frederick Douglass and Sojourner Truth. That branch features an extensive African American collection.

A $2.3 million federal grant refurbished and expanded public areas of the Central Library in 1979. Another federal grant gave $1.2 million for the Rainier Beach Branch (1981). In the late 1980s, a $4.6 million project restored the Library's six Carnegie branches; this project was recognized with an honor from the National Trust for Historic Preservation.

Meanwhile, capping the career of Library Board president Virginia Burnside, The Seattle Public Library Foundation was established in 1980 to increase outside financial support of the Library. By the mid-1990s, during the dot-com boom years, annual donations exceeded $1 million, while library circulation passed 5 million items annually.

=== 1998–present: "Libraries for All" ===
In 1998, Seattle voters, with an unprecedented 69 percent approval rate, approved the largest library bond issue then ever submitted in the United States. The $196 million "Libraries for All" bond measure, along with private funds raised by The Seattle Public Library Foundation, nearly doubled the square footage in Seattle's libraries, including the building of new branches and a new Central Library.

As of 2006, The Seattle Public Library system had 699 staff members (538 full-time equivalents). It circulated 3,151,840 adult books, 1,613,979 children's books, 570,316 WTBBL materials, and 3,895,444 other media (CDs, DVDs, videotapes, etc.) Staff members answered more than 1 million reference questions. The system also provides 1,134 public computers. Anyone with a library card can get up to one and a half hour a day of free computer use; the system accepts reservations for a computer at a particular time at a particular branch.

The library has moved to an RFID system for materials, which allows people to check out their materials without assistance, freeing librarians to focus on matters other than circulation.

From 1993 to 2004, the library was home to Nancy Pearl, one of the more well known librarians in the English-speaking world. Pearl's Book Lust book series and her "If All Seattle Read the Same Book" project (now called "Seattle Reads") resulted in her being perhaps the only librarian who has ever been honored with an action figure.

After the Great Recession resulted in eight separate operating budget cuts between 2009 and 2012, in November 2012 Seattle voters passed a 7-year levy to restore services. The levy enabled all branches to provide Sunday service (15 previously did not), increased the number of branches with 7-day-a-week service from 12 to 14, added to the maintenance and repair fund, and provided new funds to purchase physical materials, electronic content, and additional computer equipment.

The library unveiled its proposed rebranding strategy in September 2015, including a new name and new logo, that attracted widespread controversy over its cost; the first phase of the project cost $365,000 and the total cost would have been $1.3 million out of private donations. The board of trustees ultimately rejected the proposal on October 28, 2015, citing negative public feedback and other pressing uses for the funds.

A $219 million property tax levy was approved by Seattle voters in August 2019 to fund library services, including extended hours at branches, seismic renovations, social services. The levy also included funding to eliminate overdue fines for patrons, which came into effect on January 2, 2020.

During the beginning of the COVID-19 pandemic in March 2020, the library closed all of its branches and in-person services, operating exclusively with curbside pickup at some locations beginning in August. Five branches were reopened in April to provide public bathrooms to unsheltered and homeless people in the city, but other services remained closed. The first branches reopened on April 27, 2021, and the final branch reopened in October. The library system incurred an estimated $434,188 in property damage during the pandemic, particularly at the Central Library.

The library's checkout and online services were shut down by a ransomware attack in late May 2024 just before a planned scheduled maintenance. Full functionality was not restored until September 4, although branches remained open for physical access. Some online services, such as the Seattle Public Library website, were restored by May 29. By August, most online services had been restored, with the goal of all online services being available by the end of the month. The attack's data breach included information from 26,965 patrons and employees; the library's response and investigation was contracted to private consultants at a total cost of $1 million. In response to the attack and cybersecurity vulnerabilities, the city government considered a request to the Washington National Guard for assistance from the 252nd Cyberspace Operations Group but it was not forwarded to the mayor's office.

== Architecture ==
Many of The Seattle Public Library's facilities are notable works of architecture. They reflect the aesthetics of several very different periods. The various former Carnegie libraries and the Douglass-Truth library all date from a single period of two decades in the early 20th century. No further branch libraries were built between 1921 and 1954, and when branch construction resumed, the International style had swept away the earlier revivalism. Today's Greenwood and North East branches are both expanded versions of 1954 libraries, the latter originally designed by Paul Thiry; a third library from 1954, the Susan J. Henry branch on Capitol Hill, has been entirely replaced, as has Bindon & Wright's 1960 Central Library.

The Seattle Central Library opened in 2004 and was designed by Rem Koolhaas and Joshua Prince-Ramus of the Office of Metropolitan Architecture (OMA) in a joint venture with LMN Architects and Front Inc. Facade Consultants. In 2007, the building was voted #108 on the American Institute of Architects' (AIA) list of Americans' 150 favorite structures in the U.S. The building received a 2005 national AIA Honor Award for Architecture. The main library has also drawn criticism for its building being a focus on form over function, even from the design team. The signage director was quoted as saying, "“It is not without heart-breaking irony that we acknowledge a near-total lack of legibility… While librarians themselves should be commended for their improvisational tactics, overall the patrons confront a constant meddle, with one organizational layer of information Scotch-taped over another.”. Lead project designer Joshua Prince-Ramus was quoted as saying "“The wayfinding wasn't done perfectly, to put it kindly… What we thought is blatantly obvious, isn’t.”

Six current Seattle branch libraries are on the National Register of Historic Places: Columbia (architects: Harlan P. Thomas and W. Marbury Somervell), Fremont (architect: Daniel Riggs Huntington), Green Lake (architects: W. Marbury Somervell & Joseph S. Cote), Queen Anne (architects: Harlan P. Thomas and W. Marbury Somervell), University (architects: Somervell & Joseph S. Cote), and West Seattle (architects: W. Marbury Somervell & Joseph S. Cote). The original Ballard branch (architect: Henderson Ryan) also shares this status, as does the old Wallingford Fire and Police Station (architect: Daniel Riggs Huntington), which housed a branch library from 1986 to 2000.

In addition, several buildings have been designated as landmarks by the Seattle Landmarks Preservation Board: Columbia, Douglass-Truth, Fremont, Green Lake, Lake City, Magnolia, North East, Queen Anne, university, and West Seattle.

The new Ballard Branch is also one of the first buildings in Seattle to incorporate green architecture. The library is equipped with solar panels to reduce its electricity demands, as well as a green roof, which provides insulation to the building, and also serves to reduce stormwater runoff.

== Gallery ==
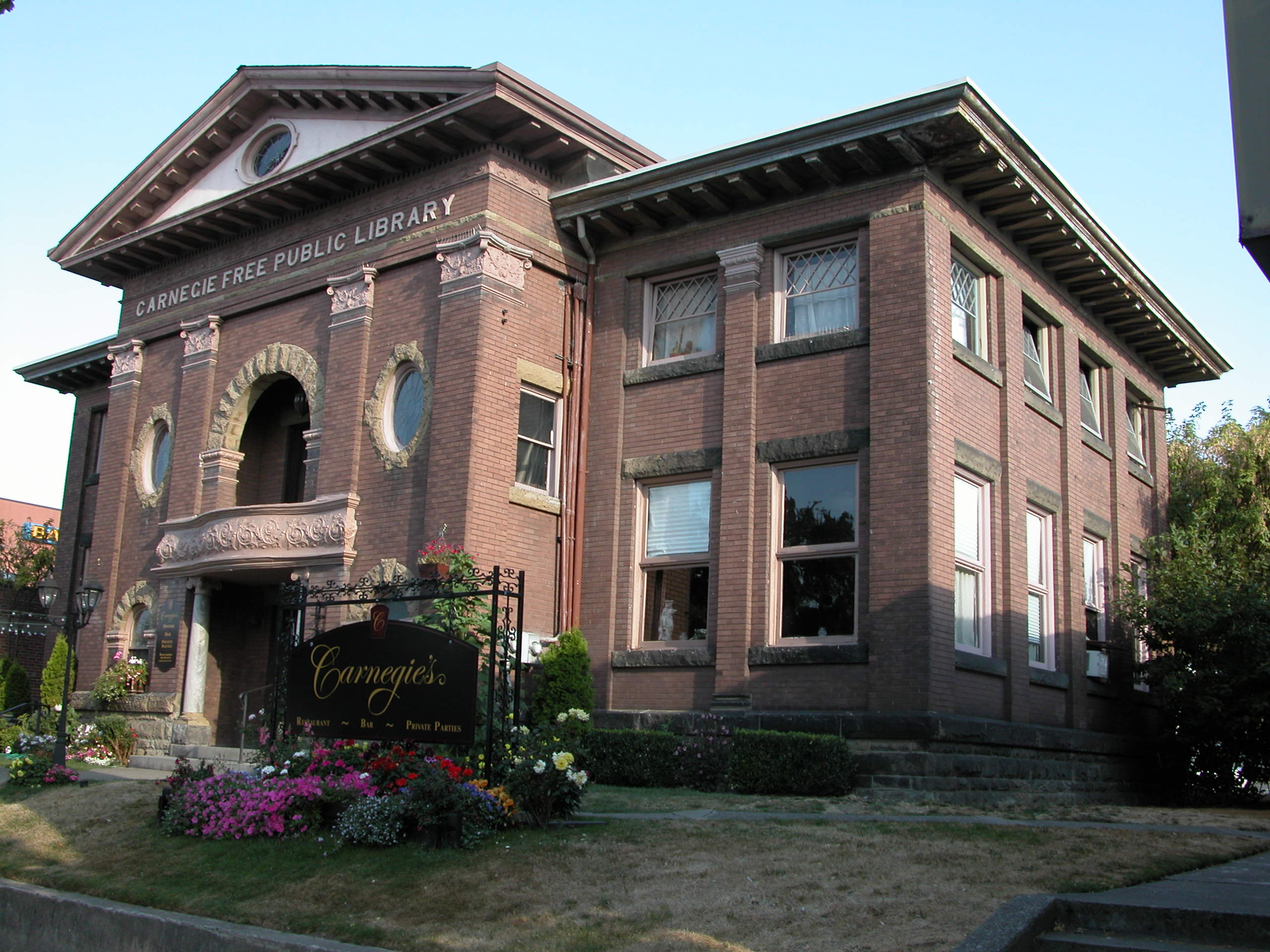
Ballard's former Carnegie Library

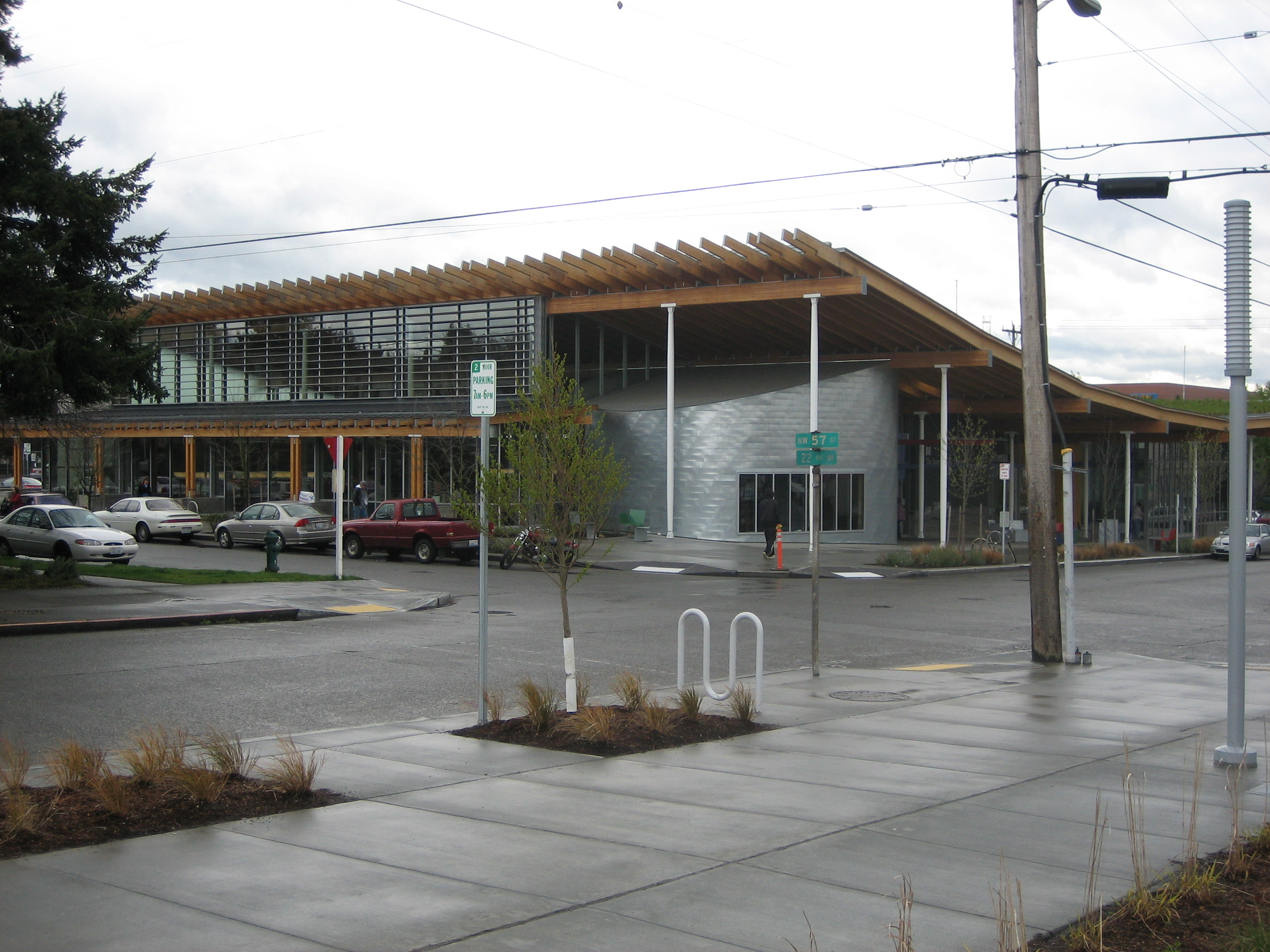
Ballard Branch

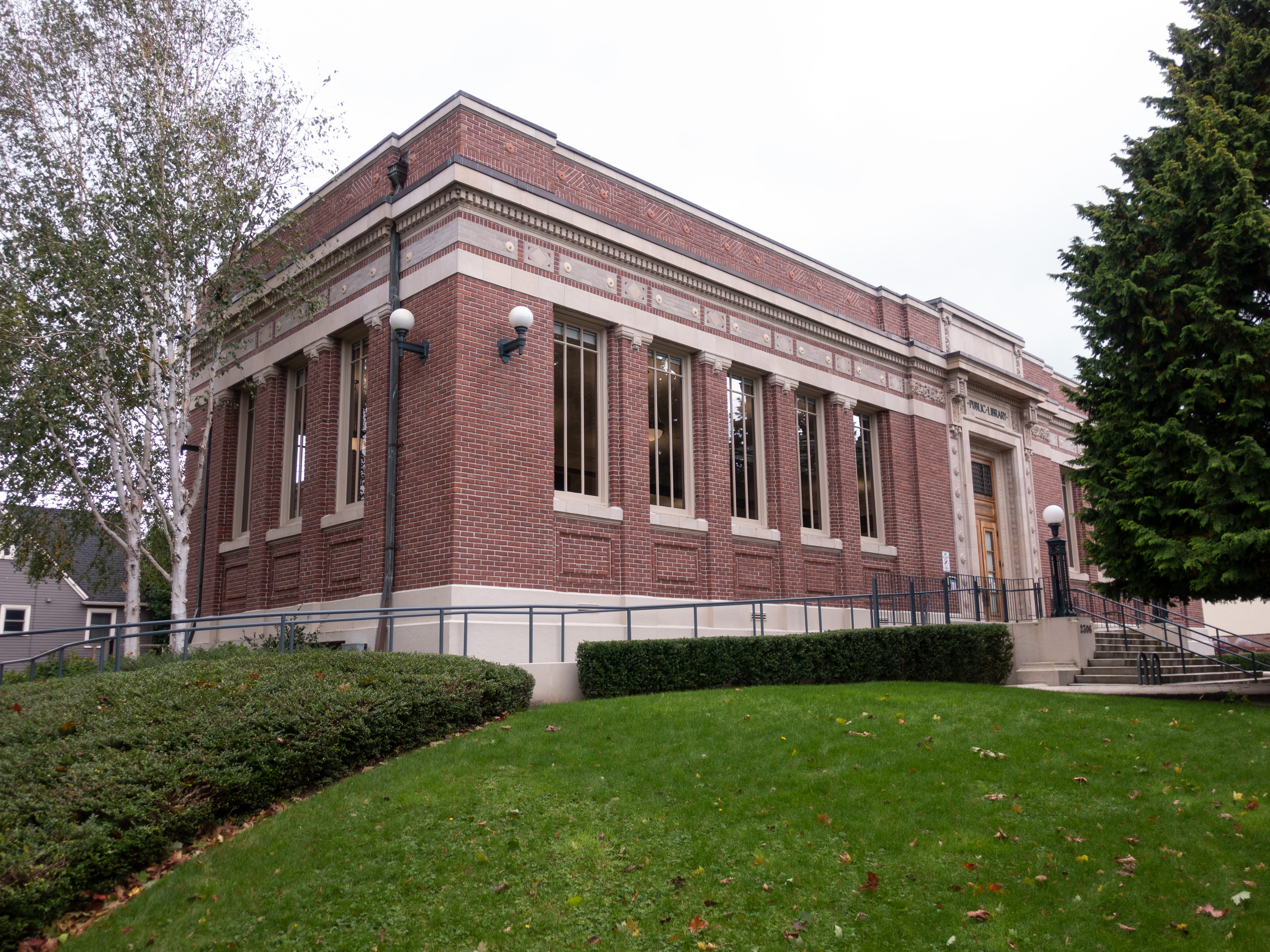
West Seattle Branch

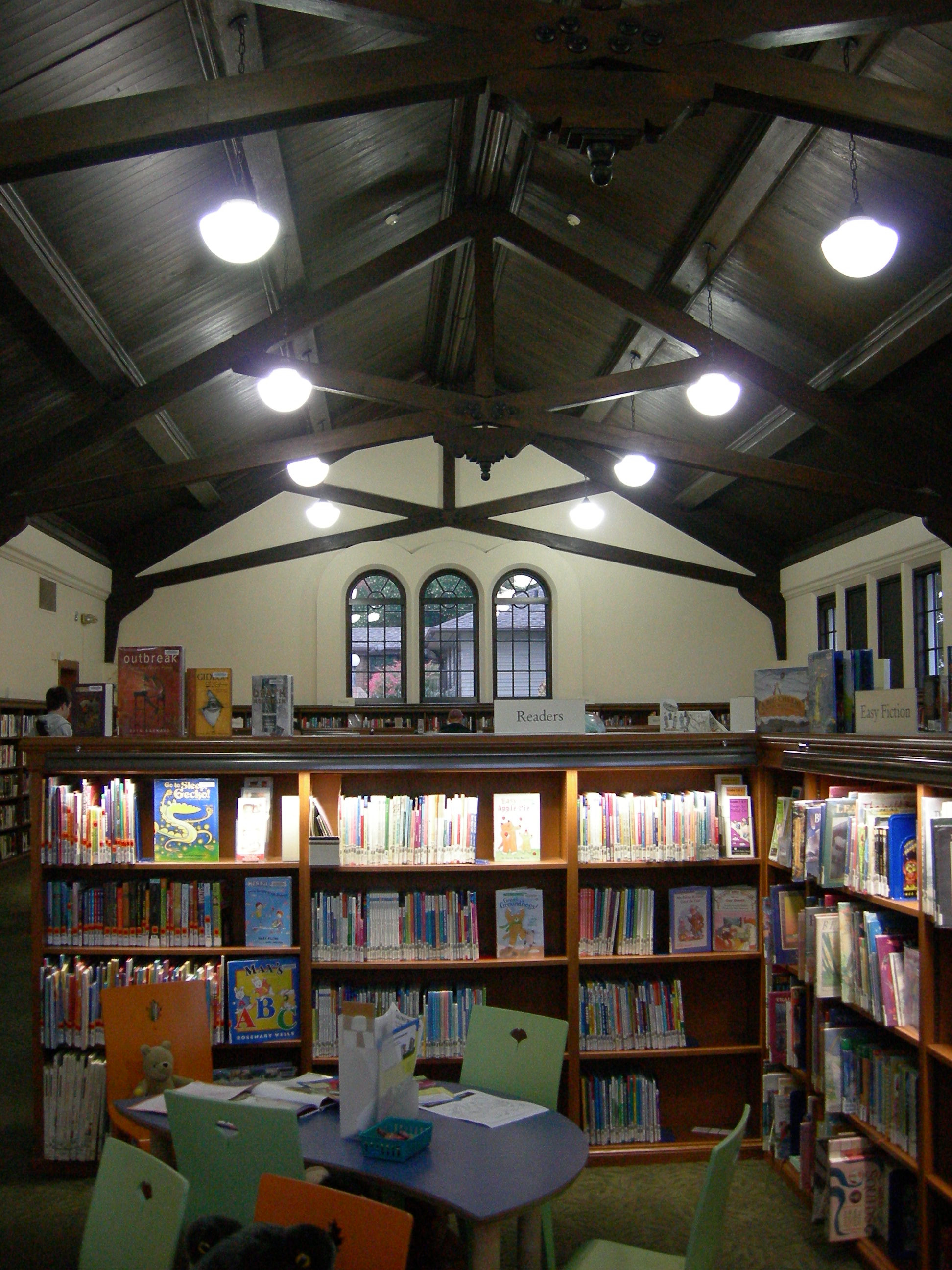
Fremont Branch (built 1921), originally a Carnegie library

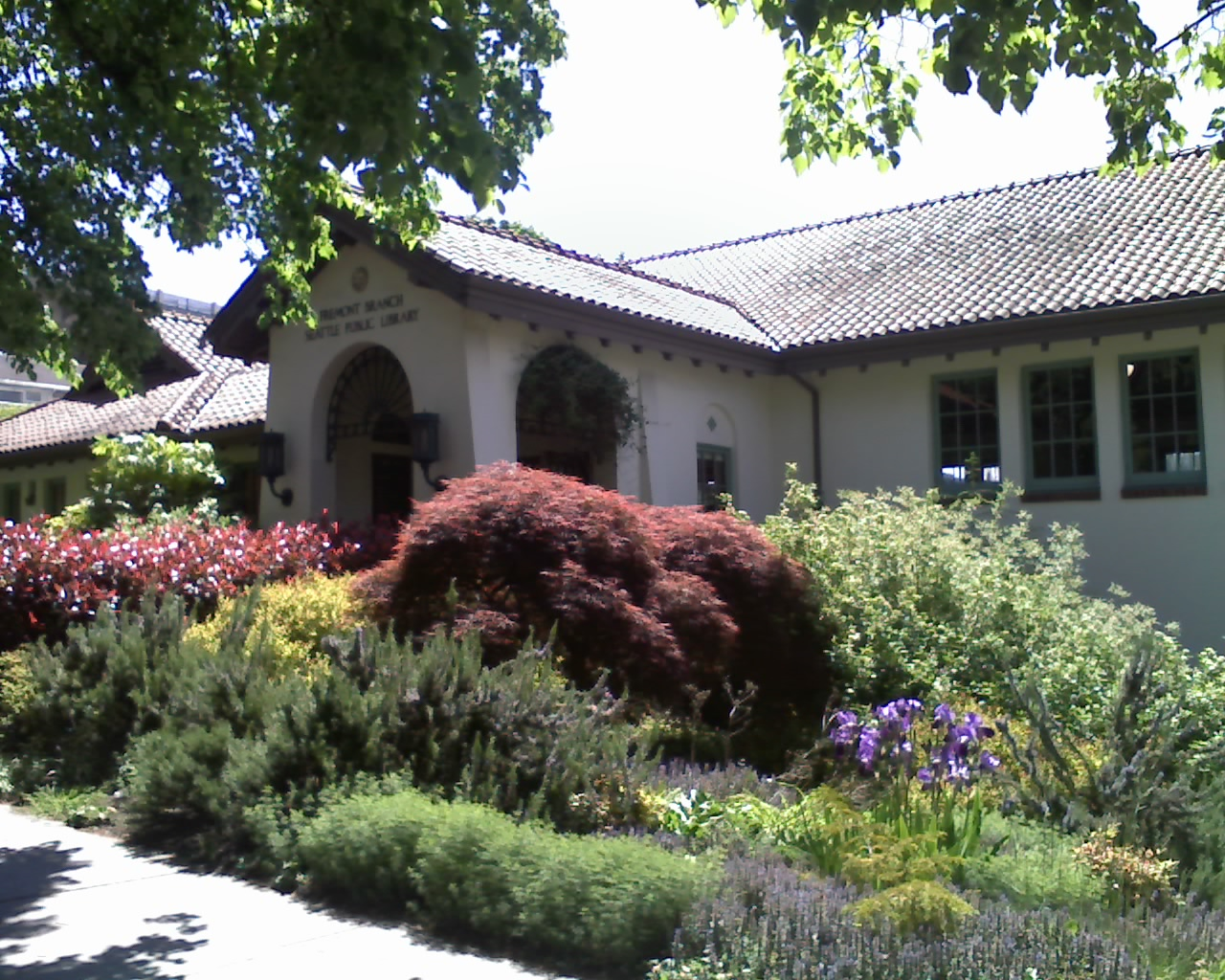
Fremont Branch, exterior

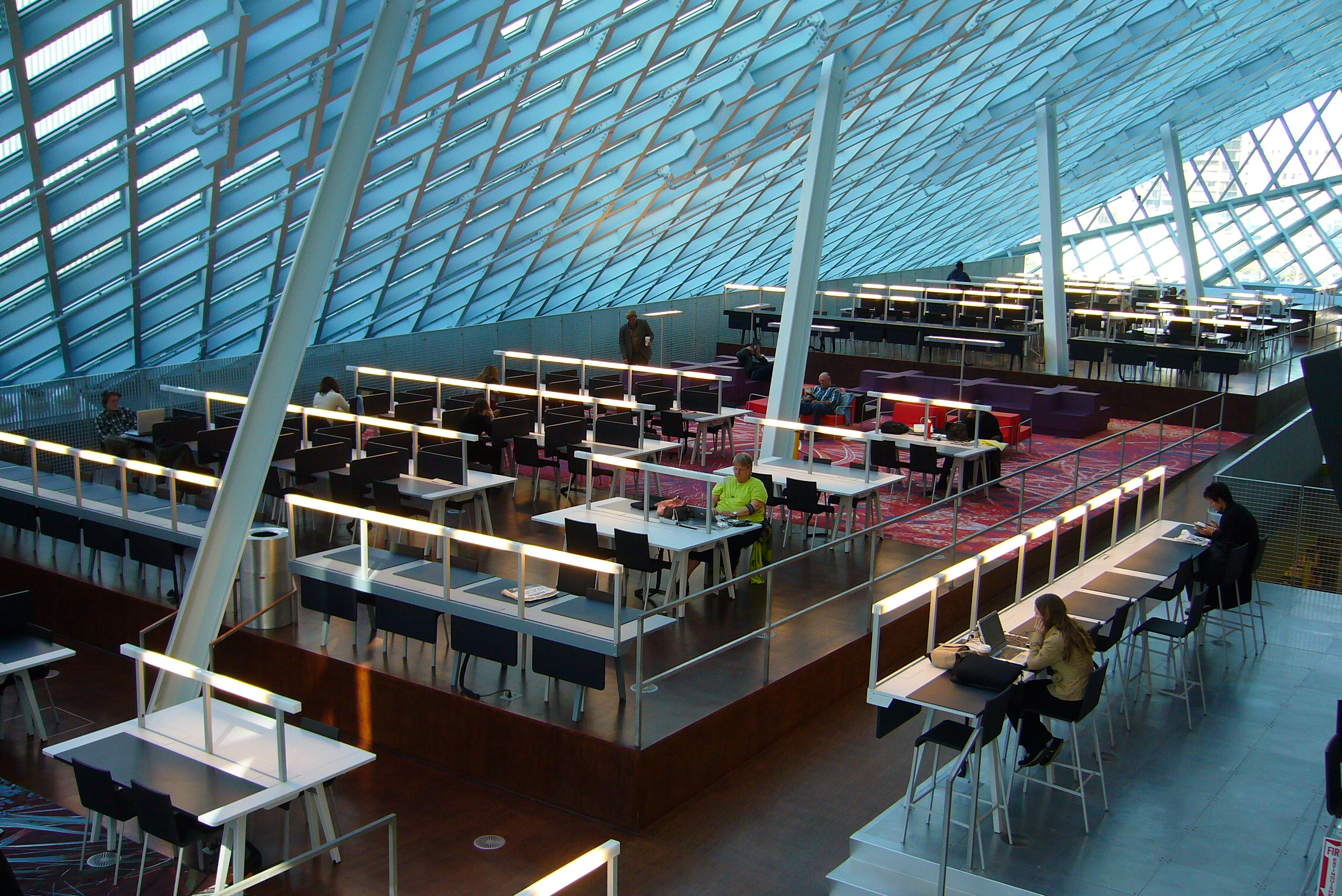
Reading Room in the present-day Central Library

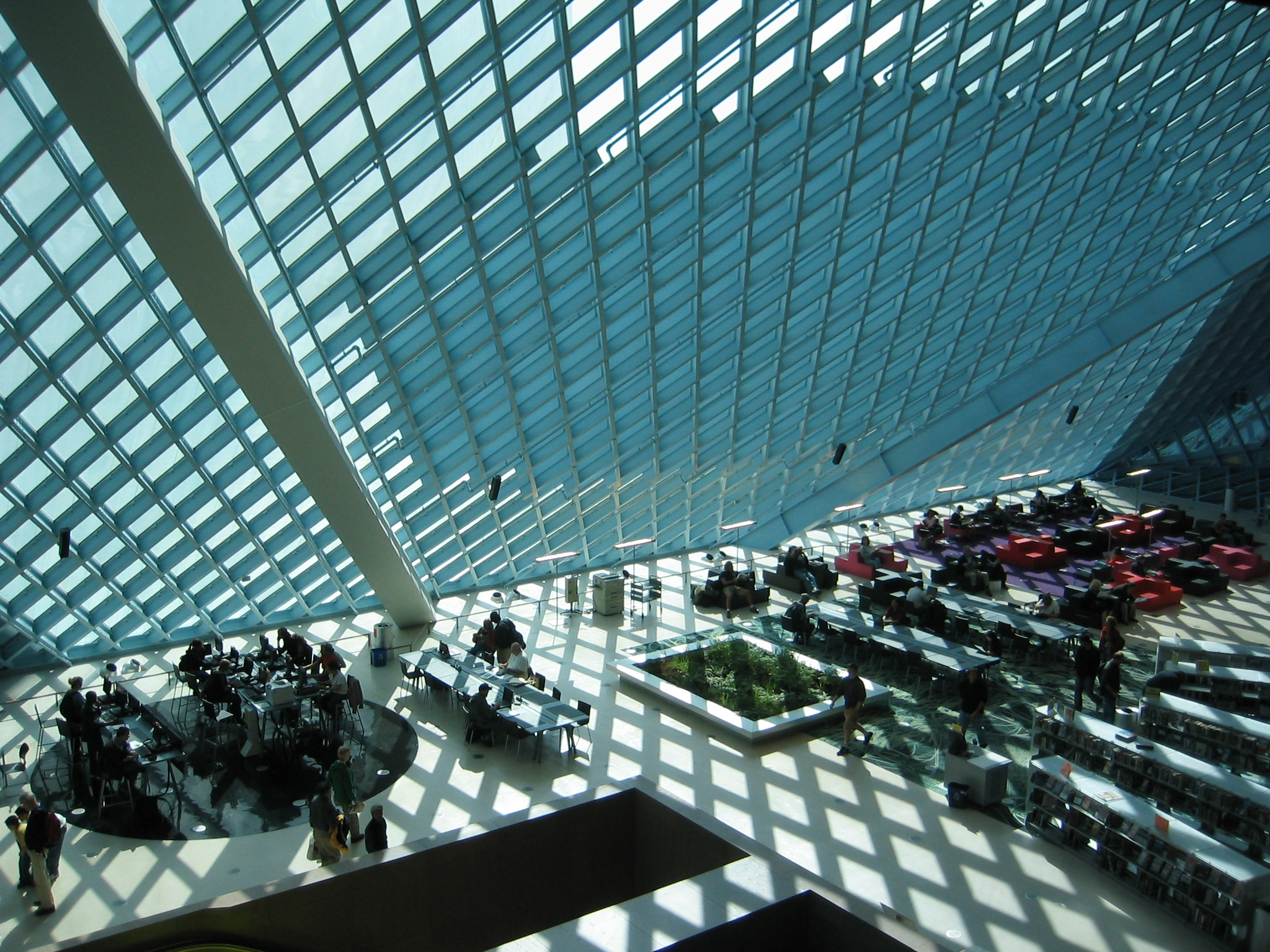
Main reading area in the Central Library

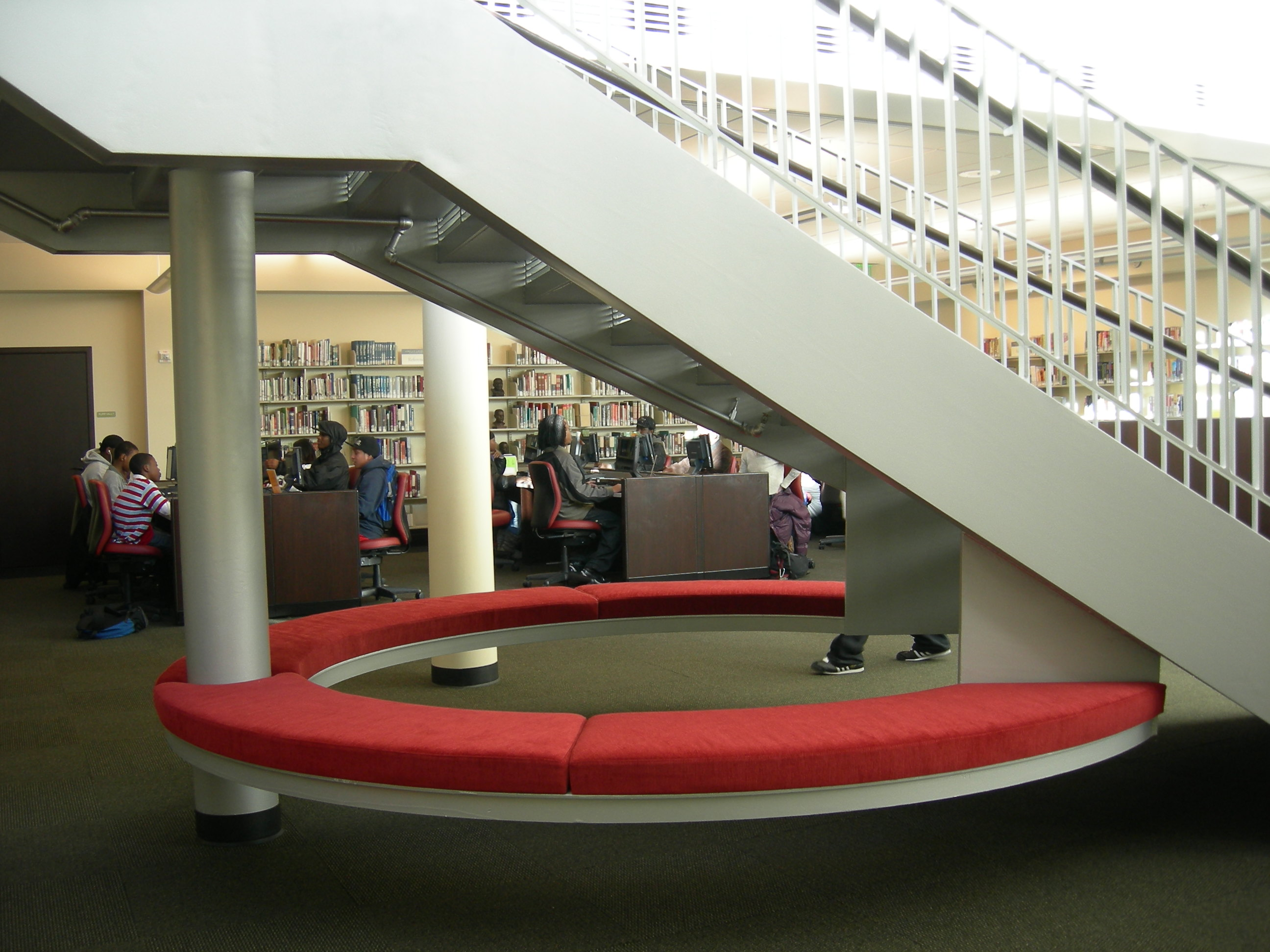
2006 wing of Douglass-Truth Branch, Central District
