= Zine Archive and Publishing Project =

Library in Seattle, Washington

The Zine Archive & Publishing Project (ZAPP) was a zine library located in Seattle, Washington, United States. ZAPP was a volunteer-driven living archive of over 30,000 self-published materials, independent media and zines. The mission statement of ZAPP is a DIY culture resource and educational center "committed to supporting zines from around the world, maintaining and validating publications outside the literary mainstream." ZAPP is a community around zines for the organization's volunteers. Zine Librarian Kelly McElroy, says that "Zines are naturally good at fostering a sense of community." ZAPP closed in April 2017

== History ==
ZAPP was founded in 1996 as a program of Hugo House and was housed in their basement until that basement flooded. ZAPP was closed to the public for one year while the volunteers mobilized to organize the move into the second floor of Hugo House and prepared a reopening party in September 2008. After the relocation to the second floor, ZAPP hosted several exhibitions based around zines, such as "Your Zine is Alive and Well and Living in ZAPP," an exhibition that featured historically-significant zines on December 8, 2011. ZAPP established an organization independent of Hugo House, operating under the fiscal sponsorship of Shunpike; the ZAPP steering committee planned to move the collection into its own building. When ZAPP announced that it would be leaving Hugo House, the volunteers hosted a special event at Vermillion Cafe in Seattle in May 2014. After three years of ZAPP planning for its own space, Hugo House, which still owned the collection, transferred it to the Seattle Public Library, leaving ZAPP without a home or collection. In response to this decision, ZAPP closed its doors and ceased activity on April 1, 2017. As of 2024, a room on the seventh floor of the Seattle Central Library houses what is now known as the ZAPP Zine Collection.

In the past, ZAPP partnered with The Vera Project on special programs and events, like "DIY Holiday Fair."

== See also ==
- Arts centre
- Alternative information centre
- Anarchist bookfair
- Cultural centre
- Infoshop
