= Iron Horse (restaurant) =

Former restaurant in Seattle, Washington, U.S.

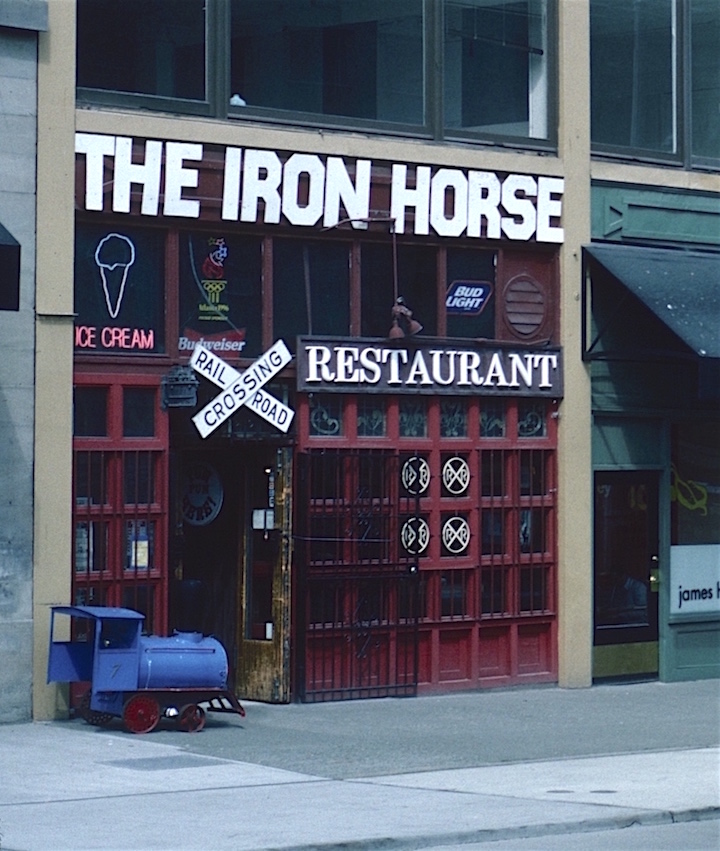
- The restaurant in April 2000
- Interactive map of Iron Horse

Restaurant information
- Established: 1971
- Closed: 2000
- Food type: Hamburger
- Location: 311 3rd Avenue South, Seattle, Washington, United States
- Coordinates: 47.599569°N 122.330478°W

The Iron Horse was a hamburger restaurant in Seattle, Washington, established in 1971 by Charlie Maslow. Located in Pioneer Square, food orders at the restaurant were delivered by model trains which moved along a track that circled the dining area. The Iron Horse closed in 2000, its then-owners citing increasing rents created by the dot com boom, combined with a loss of event business occasioned by the demolition of the Kingdome, as reasons for its shutdown.

After the closure of the Iron Horse, the subsequent closing of another train-themed Seattle restaurant – Andy's Diner – prompted the Seattle Weekly's Mike Seely to eulogize that in "the sweet hereafter ... the Big Engineer in the sky makes a choice between Andy's and the Iron Horse".

The restaurant was located at 311 3rd Avenue South, near the King Street Station.

== See also ==
- Beth's Cafe
- List of defunct restaurants of the United States
- List of hamburger restaurants
