= Feed Co. Burgers =

Restaurant in Seattle, Washington, U.S.

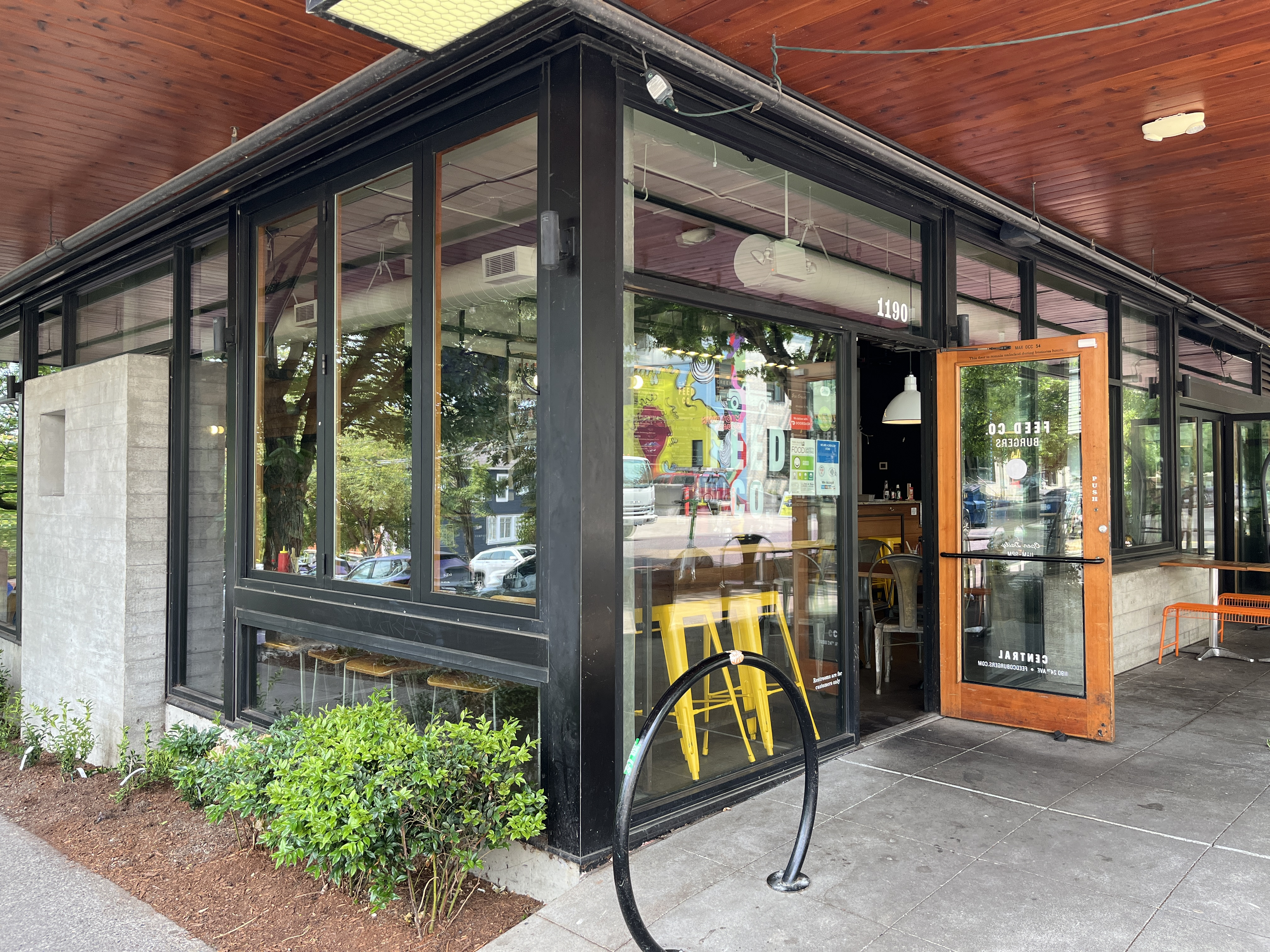
- The restaurant's exterior, 2024
- Interactive map of Feed Co. Burgers

Restaurant information
- Previous owners: Scott Staples; Heather Staples
- Location: 1190 24th Avenue, Seattle, King, Washington, 98122, United States
- Coordinates: 47.6127°N 122.3011°W

Feed Co. Burgers is a restaurant in Seattle's Central District, in the U.S. state of Washington. Previously a small chain of restaurants, the business originally operated in Redmond and has also operated in the Green Lake neighborhood. The current restaurant opened in October 2016, and the Redmond location closed in 2018. Feed Co. has garnered a positive reception and has been featured on the Food Network.

== Description ==
The restaurant Feed Co. operates in Seattle's Central District; previously, Feed Co. was a small chain, originally opened in Redmond and also operating in Seattle's Green Lake neighborhood. Seattle Metropolitan has described Feed Co. as "counter service casual, family friendly, and done up in a sort of countryside grange motif".

The menu includes burgers, sandwiches, salads, beer, and milkshakes. French fries (including sweet potato), fried cheese curds, onion rings, and tempura seasonal vegetables are available as sides. The Classic Feed Burger has a four-ounce beef patty with lettuce, pickle, tomato, and sauce. Feed Co. also has bison and lamb burgers, a turkey burger with bacon and avocado, and an Asian-inspired Bim burger with kimchi aioli. Other burger ingredients include blue cheese, caramelized onions, and watercress. The seasonal Turducken sandwich has roast turkey, sweet potato fries, and cranberry. Feed Co. also has hot dogs, a vegetarian burger, and gluten-free options.

== History ==
Feed Co. originally operated in Redmond. Scott and Heather Staples opened the Central District restaurant in October 2016. The Redmond location sold in 2018.

In 2018, the Central District location offered free burgers and kids' meals to costumed guests for Halloween. The Staples sold the Central District restaurant to Lan Bun in 2019.

Plans for a second location in Green Lake were announced in mid 2021.

Feed Co. was featured on the Food Network series Burgers, Brew and 'Que.

== Reception ==
Allecia Vermillion included Feed Co. in Seattle Metropolitan's 2020 overview of recommended eateries in the Central District. Megan Hill and Jade Yamazaki Stewart included the business in Eater Seattle's 2022 list of fifteen "great places to eat" in the neighborhood.
