= Woodland Park (Seattle) =

Park in Seattle, Washington, United States

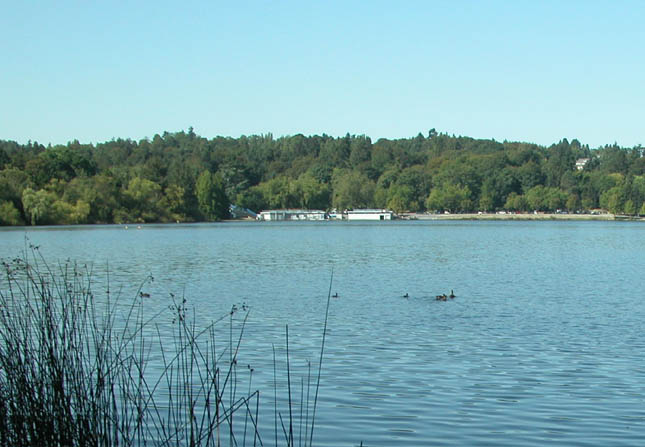
- Woodland Park in the distance, looking southwest across Green Lake
- Interactive map of Woodland Park
- Type: Urban Park
- Location: Seattle, Washington
- Coordinates: 47°40′05″N 122°20′38″W
- Area: 90.9 acres (36.8 ha)
- Established: 1902; 124 years ago
- Operator: Seattle Parks and Recreation

Woodland Park is a 90.9-acre (36.8 ha) public park in Seattle's Phinney Ridge and Green Lake neighborhoods that originated as the estate of Guy C. Phinney, lumber mill owner and real estate developer. Phinney died in 1893, and in 1902, the Olmsted Brothers firm of Boston was hired to design the city's parks, including Woodland Park.

The park is split in half by Aurora Avenue N. (State Route 99). Its western half is mostly given over to the Woodland Park Zoo and also has a baseball field and children's playground. Its eastern half, which is connected to the zoo by arched bridges over the highway and often called Lower Woodland Park, consists of trails, an off-leash dog park, a picnic area, ballfields, a pitch and putt golf course, horseshoe pits, skate park, and lawn bowling, and is contiguous with Green Lake Park.

== Wildlife in the park ==
The park is home to many species of birds and mammals as well as a few reptile and amphibian species. The most notable species are the western coyote, rabbit, barred owl, and Red-eared slider (released turtle).

The most common bird species are: American crow, American goldfinch, American robin, Anna's hummingbird, bald eagle, barn owl, barred owl, Bewick's wren, black-capped chickadee, bushtit, European starling, house finch, hairy and downy woodpeckers, northern flicker, Oregon junco, rock dove, spotted towhee, Steller's jay, various gulls, various sparrows, various swallows, and various waterfowl. The most common mammal species are: coyotes, coypus, feral rabbits, brown rats, western gray squirrels, mountain beavers, and North American beavers. The most common reptile and amphibian species are: red eared sliders, spring peepers and garter snakes.

== Warren G. Harding memorial ==
In 1925, a memorial was erected in the park to commemorate the July 27, 1923 speech delivered by President Warren G. Harding before a crowd of over 30,000 Boy Scouts who were gathered at Woodland for a national jamboree. It was one of the last speeches the president would give; he died six days later in San Francisco.

The memorial was demolished in 1977, and the site now lies buried beneath the Woodland Park Zoo's African Savanna exhibit. The memorial's only surviving elements—two life-sized bronze statues of Boy Scouts that once saluted the image of Harding—were relocated to the headquarters of the Chief Seattle Council of the Boy Scouts of America.
