= Andy's Diner =

Defunct restaurant in Seattle, Washington, U.S.

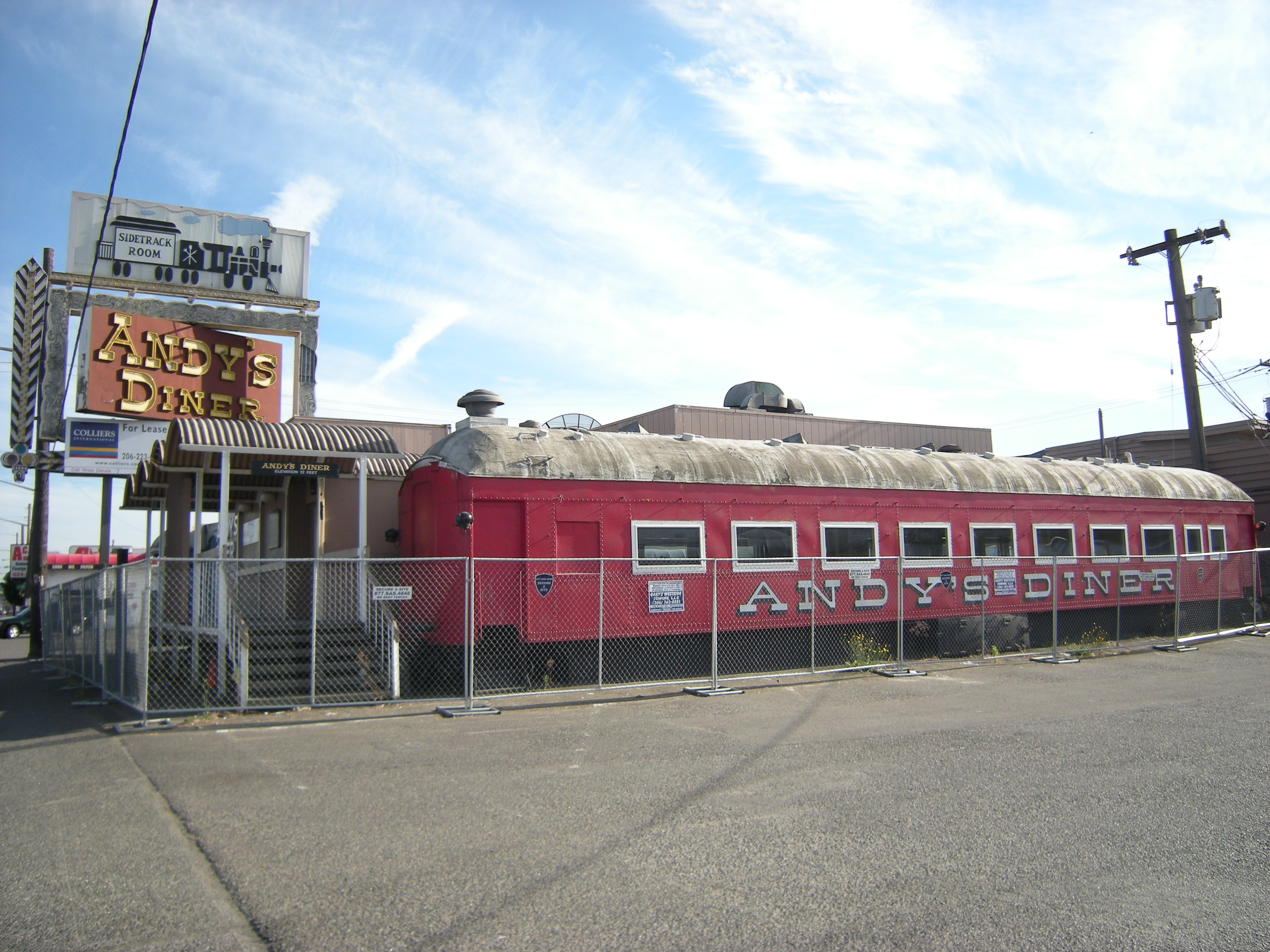
- Andy's Diner, pictured facing south in 2008, following its closure
- Interactive map of Andy's Diner

Restaurant information
- Established: 1949
- Closed: 2008
- Previous owners: Andy Nagy, Andy Yurkanin
- Food type: Diner fare
- Location: 2963 4th Ave S, Seattle, Washington, 98134
- Coordinates: 47.5758631°N 122.3317305°W

Andy's Diner (also known as Andy's Railroad) was a roadside diner, constructed from several decommissioned railcars, in Seattle, Washington, established in 1949 and closed in 2008. It was constructed on the former location of a more traditional diner that had been built in 1930.

== Concept and menu ==
Once described as a "longstanding slice of Route 66 Americana", Andy's Diner was housed in a series of adjoining railway cars located in the industrial SoDo neighborhood. The menu featured a selection of typical diner fare.

== History ==
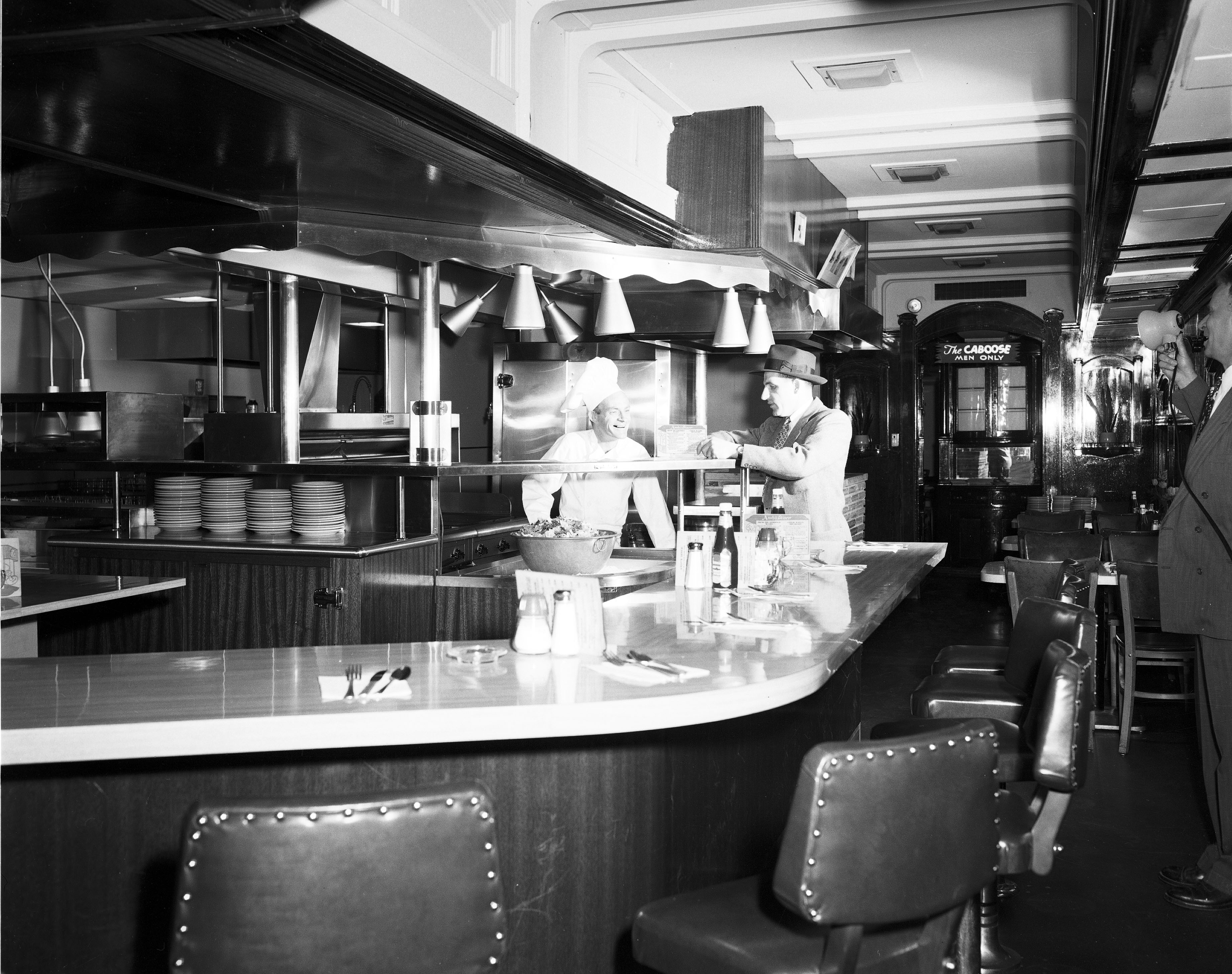
Interior of Andy's Diner, 1954

Andy's Diner was opened by Andy "Big Andy" Nagy in 1949, with Nagy subsequently joined in the business by his nephew Andy "Little Andy" Yurkanin. The restaurant's railway theme was reportedly inspired by a similar venue in Spokane. Andy's Diner was sited on the former location of a more traditional diner that had been built in 1930. Originally consisting of a single railcar, over time it grew to include a total of seven, including one used by Franklin Roosevelt during the United States presidential election of 1944.

During the restaurant's heyday it frequently served up to 1,200 people for lunch and was known as a "workingman's paradise". Boeing chief Thornton Wilson was among the diner's regular customers. In the 1960s, Nagy and Yurkanin attempted to open a chain of Li'l Abner-themed restaurants. Though that venture did not succeed, the duo later started several other railcar-housed restaurants in the Pacific Northwest including Andy's Tukwila Station (in Tukwila, Washington), the Eugene Station (in Eugene, Oregon), and Andy's Auburn Station (in Auburn, Washington).

In 1980 founder Nagy died. Yurkanin continued to operate the restaurant until 1996, when he retired, his son thereafter taking over the venture. The Yurkanins ultimately sold the business to a trio of local restauranters, though the facility's property owner – Seattle real estate developer Henry Liebman – maintained ownership of the site.

=== New ownership and closure ===
Andy's Diner was briefly closed in 2000 for remodeling before opening under its first new management since 1949. Eight years later, however, the restaurant permanently closed with co-owner Bill Howard explaining that the business had ceased to be profitable and that "times have changed since the heyday of Andy's Diner".

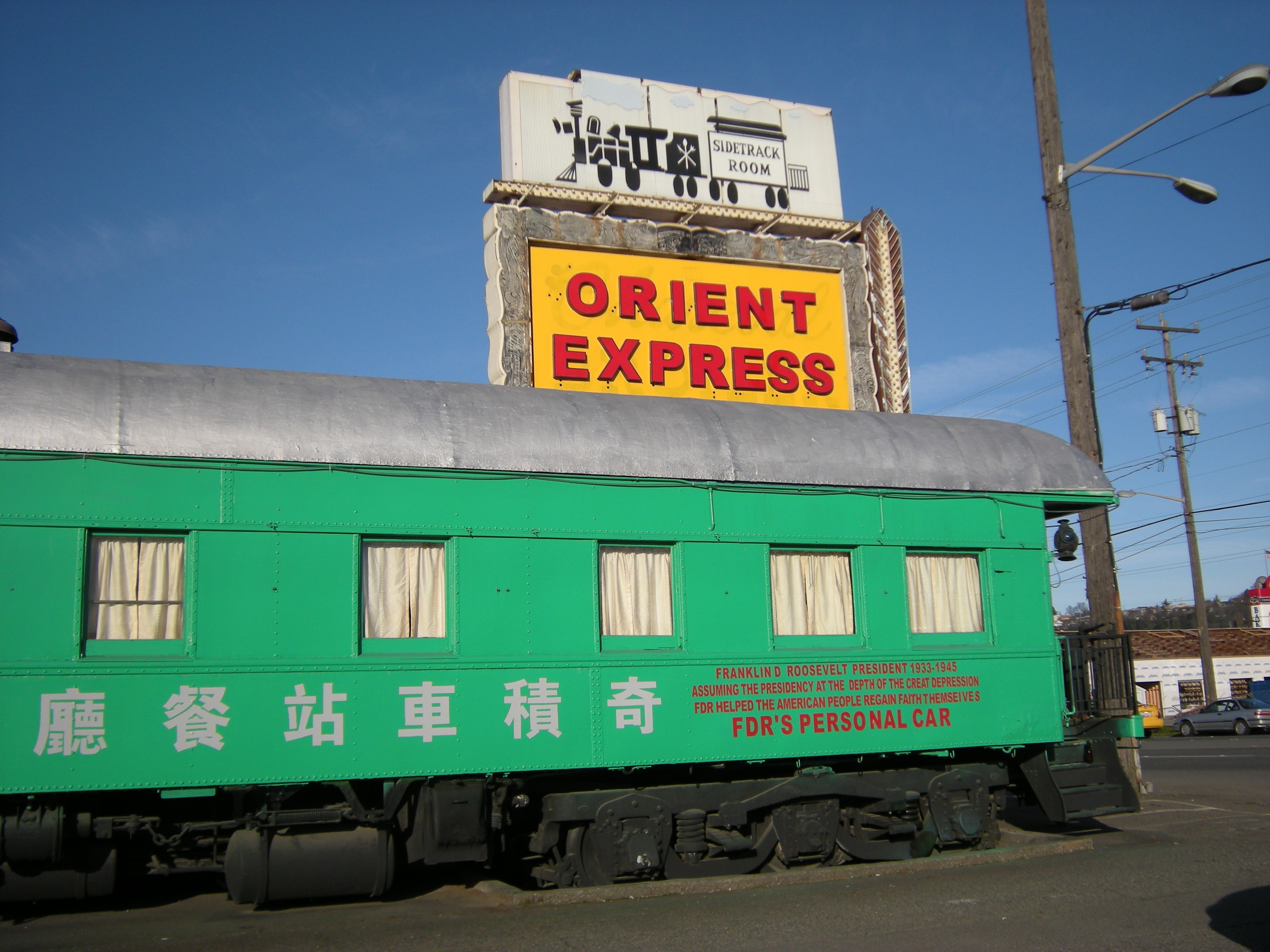
The Orient Express, which opened in the location which formerly housed Andy's Diner, pictured facing north in 2008

=== Reopening as Orient Express ===
After Andy's Diner closed in January 2008, developer Henry Liebman, owner of the restaurant property, began offering it for rent, hoping that if the new lessee "just got back to serving a decent steak and a potato," it would be more successful thanks to the location's parking spaces and closeness to Safeco Field and Qwest Field. Eventually, in October of that year, a Chinese restaurant, the Orient Express, opened on the site, occupying the same railcars that once housed Andy's Diner. The Seattle Times reported that the Orient Express, owned by Gun "Ed" Ting, had managed to attract former regulars of Andy's Diner, despite the significant change in menu from steak, potatoes, and other traditional diner fare to American Chinese cuisine. The Seattle Weekly would later applaud the Orient Express for the fact that there were "no tacky portraits of rickshaws and geisha girls" adorning the walls and that, indeed, the decor was essentially unchanged from the restaurant's time as a roadside diner. According to the newspaper, its "most mysterious dish" was a menu item called Henry Liebman's Noodle Soup.

== Legacy ==
The closure of Andy's Diner followed the earlier closure of another train-themed Seattle restaurant – the Iron Horse – and prompted the Seattle Weekly's Mike Seely to eulogize that in "the sweet hereafter ... the Big Engineer in the sky makes a choice between Andy's and the Iron Horse". Menus from Andy's Diner are archived in the special collections unit of the Seattle Public Library.

== See also ==
- Beth's Cafe
- List of defunct restaurants of the United States
