= Guy Carleton =

Guy Carleton may refer to:

- Guy Carleton (bishop) (1605–1685), Anglican bishop
- Guy Carleton, 1st Baron Dorchester (1724–1808), British Army officer and colonial administrator
- Guy Carleton (general), (1857–1946), United States Army major general

== See also ==
- Guy Carleton Wiggins (1883–1962), American landscape painter
- Guy Carleton Phinney (1851–1993), Canadian real estate tycoon
