= Weedin Place fallout shelter =

- Interactive map of the Weedin Place fallout shelter area

General information
- Type: Fallout shelter and bridge leg
- Location: Weedin Place at Interstate 5, Green Lake neighborhood, Seattle, Washington, US
- Coordinates: 47.6783°N 122.3214°W
- Groundbreaking: May 15, 1962
- Inaugurated: March 29, 1963
- Cost: $67,300
- Owner: Washington State Department of Transportation

Dimensions
- Diameter: 60 ft (18 m)
- Other dimensions: 15 in (380 mm) thick walls

Technical details
- Material: Concrete
- Floor area: 3,000 square feet (280 m^{2})

Design and construction
- Engineer: Andersen-Bjornstad-Kane
- Known for: First and only fallout shelter under public roadway in U.S.

The Weedin Place Fallout Shelter is a disused and sealed off fallout shelter in Seattle, Washington, United States. It was built in 1962–1963, under Interstate 5, to hold about 100 individuals. It had diesel generators, an air circulation system that included electric heating and air conditioning units; a well, pump and pressure tank; and piping connecting the facility to the city water and sewer systems. It was intended to be the prototype "for countless similar shelters that would be installed nationwide under interstate highways".

The fallout shelter is categorized by Washington State Department of Transportation (WSDOT) as a bridge, since it supports the southbound lanes of Interstate 5, and is eligible for inclusion in the National Register of Historic Places.

== Prototype fallout shelter ==
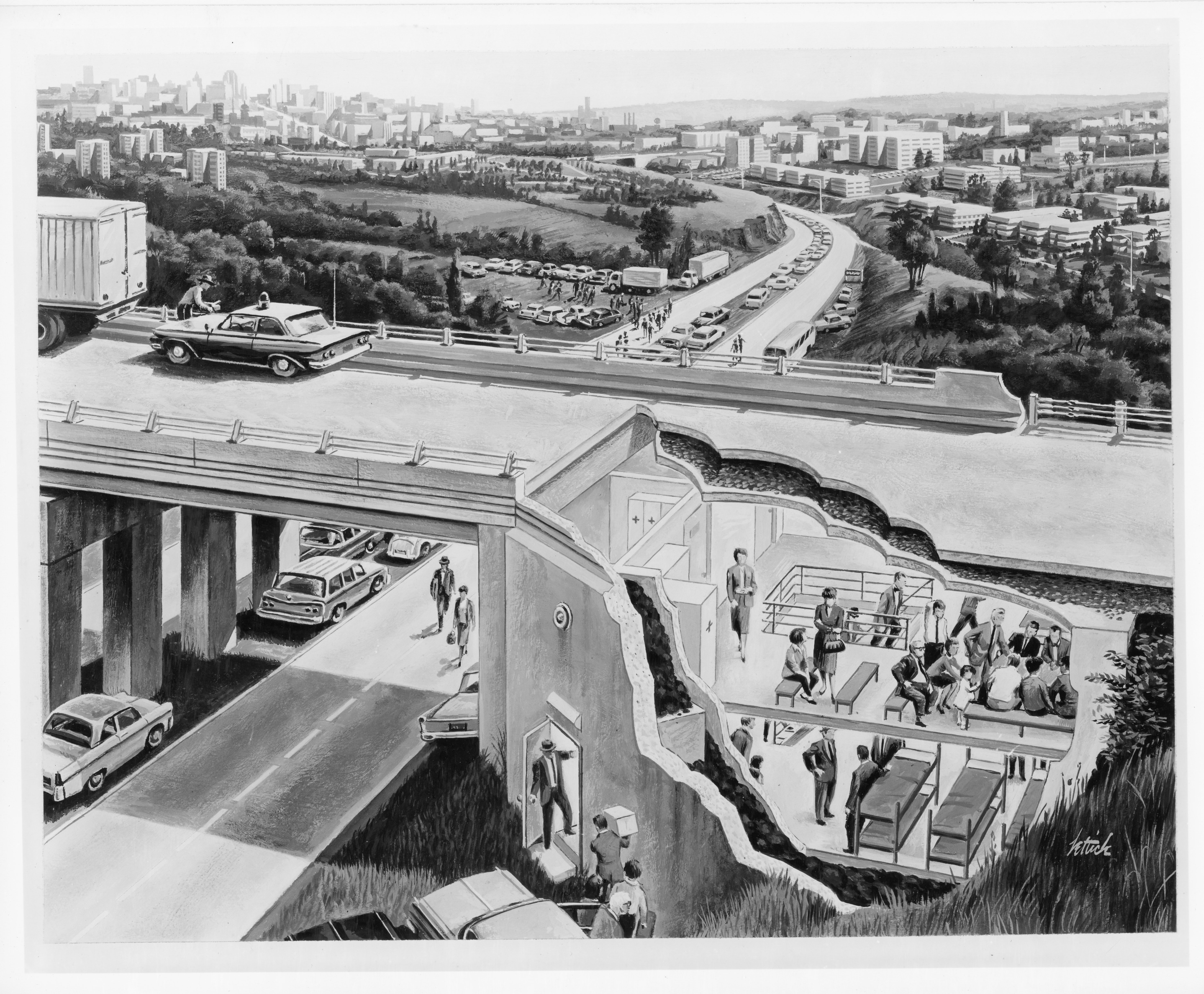
Black and white drawing of a bomb shelter under a highway (FEMA)

As a prototype "community fallout shelter", the structure is considered "perhaps the only one of its kind in the world" and "apparently the first, and only, fallout shelter ever constructed in the U.S. under a public roadway".

The shelter is 3,000 square feet (280 m^{2}) with a circular main room 60 feet (18 m) in diameter, and cost $67,300 to build. The walls are 15-inch (380 mm) thick concrete. It also had an artesian well. It was engineered by Andersen-Bjornstad-Kane firm in Seattle, and constructed by McDonald Construction of Seattle. It was originally designed to house 200 people and enough supplies for 2 weeks. When it was dedicated, pamphlets circulated that said its capacity had grown to 300 people. It was built to survive the initial fallout of any nuclear detonation, but was not designed to survive a direct nuclear strike.

It was built as a "dual purpose" building, meaning it would have other primary functions besides being a fallout shelter. Despite its purpose as a fallout shelter, it was never stocked with food or other survival supplies and there were never any drills run in the event of a nuclear attack. After its construction, it was initially used by the Washington State Patrol as a licensing office, then used by the WSDOT as file storage, and finally as storage for surplus furniture. Since 2018, it has been sealed shut by the WSDOT after being broken into, vandalized, and stripped for parts.
