= Guy Carleton Phinney =

Guy Carleton Phinney (1851–1893) was a real estate developer in Seattle.

== Career ==
Phinney made a fortune in Canadian real estate in the later half of the 19th century. In 1881, he relocated from Nova Scotia to Seattle. Phinney was successful in the real estate, lumber, and insurance industries.

He purchased land north of the city next to Green Lake and built an English-style manor. The tracts were considered suburban at the time. To attract people to the area, the 200-acre (81 ha; 0.31 sq mi) estate included a menagerie and what would become Woodland Park. A private street car serviced the park from nearby Fremont.

== Legacy ==
Six years after Phinney's death, the city council purchased the park over the veto of Seattle's Mayor, Thomas Humes. The park was further developed and the menagerie became the Woodland Park Zoo.

Phinney is the namesake of Seattle's Phinney Ridge neighborhood. In the Magnolia neighborhood, Carleton Park was named for him by his son.
