= Green Lake Crew =

American rowing club

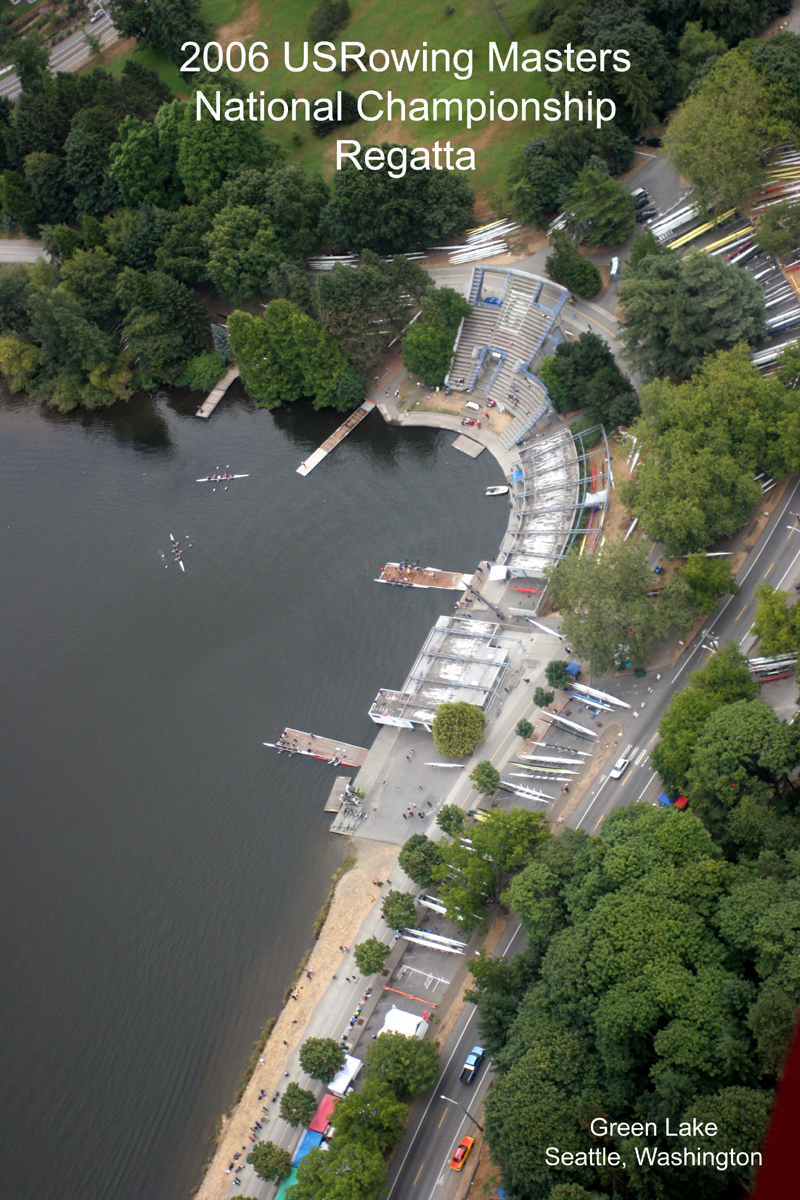
GLC is located at the Green Lake Small Craft Center in Seattle, Washington.

Green Lake Crew (GLC) is a public rowing club in Seattle, Washington (USA), jointly sponsored by the Seattle Parks and Recreation Department and the Rowing Advisory Council. The program is located on the southern shore of Green Lake at the Green Lake Small Craft Center (GLSCC). Green Lake Crew was chartered in 1947 and first went "on the water" in the spring of 1948.

== GLC created ==
GLC was created through the joint effort of community leaders from the Boys' Club of Seattle, the Seattle Times, and the University of Washington, working with professional staff of the Seattle Parks Department. Their collaboration culminated in the creation of both GLC and the Seattle Junior Rowing Commission. The latter body had as its mission organizing the efforts of program participants and other volunteers to support growth of "junior rowing" in the area. Originally a program for high school-age boys, it became open to girls and boys in 1963. With junior crew growing in popularity throughout the region, the Parks Department in 1984 created the Rowing Advisory Council (RAC) as the focal point of volunteer efforts to support GLC. Adult crew, i.e., "masters rowing," was initiated at Green Lake that same year.

== Hosting of regattas ==
Green Lake is a hub of rowing in the Pacific Northwest, as it hosts three regular regattas annually. The Spring Regatta is traditionally the year's first major rowing event in the region, with as many as 1,200 junior and masters athletes of all ages competing. GLC's Summer Extravaganza is a more relaxed event, traditionally the last major regatta of the summer. The event is the first major rowing competition for many of the novice and beginning rowers who are introduced to the sport during GLSCC summer classes. The Frostbite Regatta, a forty-year-old tradition, is the third major event hosted annually by GLC. It shares the last weekend of fall racing in the Northwest with the Lake Washington Rowing Club's annual Head of the Lake regatta. For many participants, this is an intense weekend where they race the 1000-meter course on Saturday at Green Lake, and then the three-mile head-race on Lake Washington the next day.

== Other hosted events ==
Beyond the three regattas annually hosted by the RAC at Green Lake, GLC intermittently hosts a variety of events of regional and national import. For instance, Green Lake in the summer of 2006 teamed with its sister-organization, Mt. Baker Rowing, to host USRowing's Masters National Championship regatta. Green Lake was the site for the United States Women's National Rowing Association's national championships in 1969, 1972, 1978, and 1985. The Collegiate Women's National Championships were held on Green Lake in 1984.

With its protected water and diverse inventory of rowing equipment, Green Lake also routinely figures prominently in the development and selection of the country's premier junior rowers. GLC co-hosted (with the University of Washington) the Junior Women's National Team Selection Camp in 2000 and 2001. The Junior Men's National Selection Camp was co-hosted by Green Lake in 1990. Green Lake regularly hosts summer “development camps” that serve as the vehicle from which Northwest junior athletes are groomed for further participation on a national level.

== GLC in competition ==
Green Lake Crew established its tradition of competitive excellence at the highest levels in 1959 when a coxed four of junior rowers earned the right to compete at the U.S. National Championships (i.e. not “Junior Nationals,” but “Nationals”) in Chicago. This crew not only won a gold medal in this event, but subsequently represented the United States at the Pan American Games in São Paulo, Brazil, where they rowed home first in that competition as well. That boat was nominated by the Seattle Post-Intelligencer for its "Man of the Year in Sports" award in 1959.
