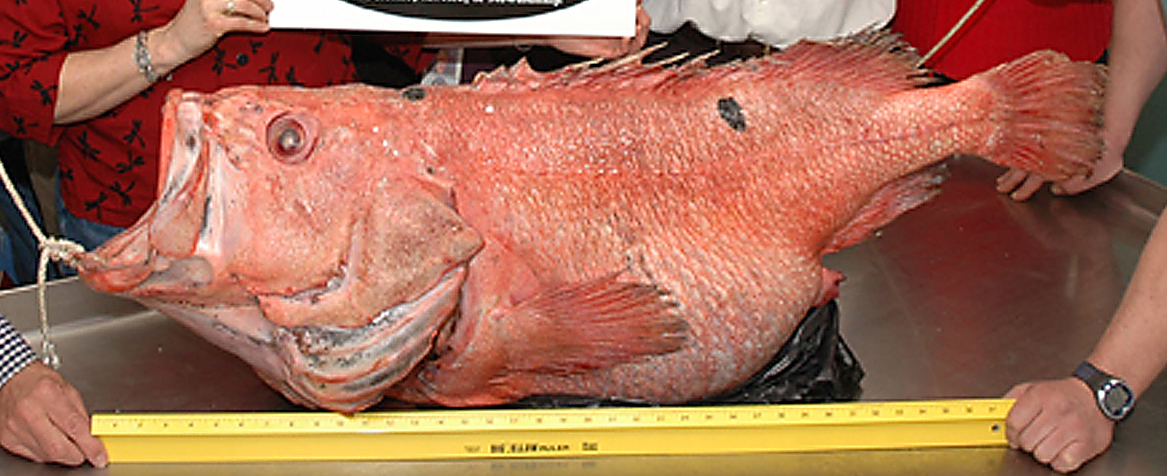

Scientific classification
- Kingdom: Animalia
- Phylum: Chordata
- Class: Actinopterygii
- Order: Perciformes
- Family: Scorpaenidae
- Genus: Sebastes
- Species: S. borealis

Binomial name
- Sebastes borealis Barsukov, 1970

= Shortraker rockfish =

Species of fish

The shortraker rockfish (Sebastes borealis) is an offshore, demersal species of marine ray-finned fish belonging to the subfamily Sebastinae, the rockfishes, part of the family Scorpaenidae. It is found in the northern Pacific Ocean.

== Taxonomy ==
The shortraker rockfish was first formally described in 1970 by the Soviet ichthyologist Vladimir Viktorovich Barsukov with the type locality given as the North Pacific at 57°41'N, 150°00'W at a depth of 270–310 m (890–1,020 ft). Some authorities place this species in the subgenus Zalopyr. The specific name borealis means "northern", an allusion which was not explained but which probably refers to the North Pacific.

== Description ==
The shortraker rockfish is pale pink, pinkish-orange or red marked with blotches and saddles. Each of the fins have some black coloration and the dorsal fin may have white tips to the spines. They have a red mouth, which may have black blotches. When captured, their color darkens. They get their name from their stubby gill rakers, which are tipped with little nobs. They have large pores on their lower jaw. The dorsal fin has 13 spines and 13 soft rays while the anal fin has 3 spines and 7 soft rays, The spines on the head may be moderately sized or large and the spines present are the nasal, preocular, supraocular, postocular, tympanic, parietal and nuchal spines although they may or may not be coronal spines. They have no more than 2 spines below the eye. The caudal fin is slightly concave. The shortraker rockfish is the largest species in the genus Sebastes and the maximum reported total length is 120 cm (47 in)>

== Distribution and habitat ==
The shortraker rockfish is distributed from the southeastern Kamchatka Peninsula, Russia, to Fort Bragg, California. It attains lengths greater than one metre (>39 inches) and weighs up to 20 kg (44 pounds). In the Gulf of Alaska, shortraker rockfish are sampled annually during longline surveys and are most abundant between depths of 300–400 metres (980–1,310 ft). It is a bathydemersal species found over soft substrates.

== Biology ==
The Shortraker rockfish lifespan is thought to average about 120 years, the second-longest of all varieties of rockfish to the rougheye rockfish, estimated at 140 years. This makes rockfish some of the world's oldest living fish. Like many other rockfishes it is a viviparous species.

== Fisheries ==
Commercial harvesting in the Gulf of Alaska began in the early 1960s when foreign trawl fleets were targeting more abundant species. In recent years, high catch rates indicate that the domestic trawl fleet targets this species; shortraker rockfish comprised 14.9% of the species composition of slope rockfish harvested in 1990, although trawl survey data indicates they comprised only 2.5% of the biomass.

In 1991, catch limits were established for shortraker rockfish to prevent overharvesting of this species in the Gulf of Alaska. Catch limits are based on biomass estimates derived from bottom trawl catch rates. These biomass estimates are questionable, however, because the catch efficiency of bottom trawls on shortrakers is unknown. Fishermen report that shortrakers school off-bottom and above rugged habitat in steep-slope areas where bottom trawls cannot sample effectively.

== Record specimens ==
Fish age is estimated by counting growth rings in its earbone, known as an otilith, similar to tree age dating. However, the method is only accurate in temperate regions, where variances between warm and cool season growth rates create distinct ring borders. In both tropical and arctic waters it becomes very difficult to distinguish such annual variations. However, as shortraker rockfish caught off Sitka are regarded as coming from waters along the boundary of temperate and arctic regions annual growth rings can be slightly discernible.

The record for oldest shortraker rockfish is 175 years, established by an 83 cm (33 in) specimen.

In 2007, fishermen caught a specimen that was estimated to be between 90 and 115 years old. The fish weighed in at 62 pounds (28 kg) and was measured at 112 centimetres (44 in). It was caught south of the Pribilof Islands at an estimated depth of 2,100 feet (640 m).

In 2013, Henry Liebman, a sport fisherman from Seattle, caught a specimen from 900 feet (270 m) below the surface and 10 miles (16 km) offshore near Sitka, Alaska. Experts believed the 42-inch, 39.08 pounds (17.73 kg), shortraker was the oldest ever caught, with an estimated age of 200 years. It was later found that the fish was only 64 years old.
