= Phinney Ridge, Seattle =

- Seattle Neighborhood
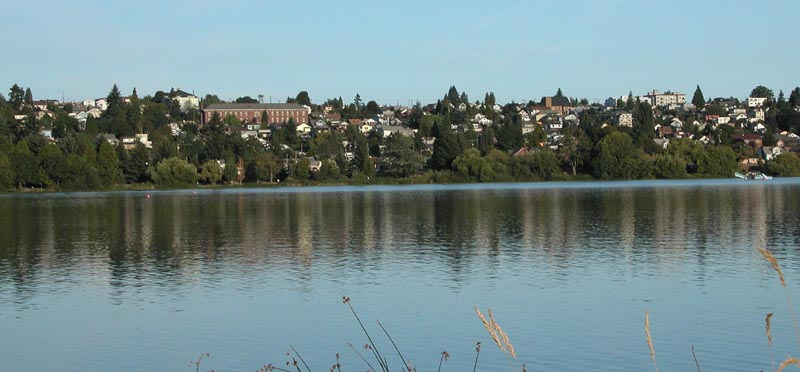
- Green Lake and the eastern side of Phinney Ridge

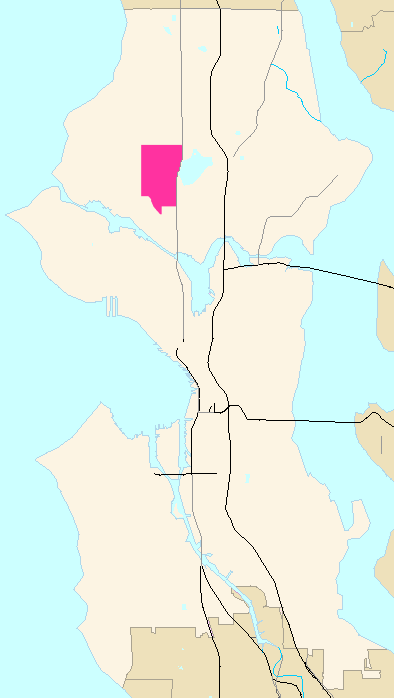
- Phinney Ridge Highlighted in Pink
- Coordinates: 47°40′33″N 122°21′15″W
- Country: United States
- State: Washington
- County: King
- City: Seattle
- ZIP Code: 98103
- Area Code: 206, 564

Phinney Ridge is a neighborhood in north central Seattle, Washington, United States. It is named after the ridge which runs north and south, separating Ballard from Green Lake, from approximately N. 45th to N. 70th Street. The ridge, in turn, is named after Guy C. Phinney, lumber mill owner and real estate developer, whose estate was bought by the city and turned into Woodland Park in 1899. Phinney's estate had included a private menagerie, and the western half of the park became what is now the Woodland Park Zoo.

The ridge is steep in places, especially along the western slope. 60th Street NW between 2nd and 3rd Avenues NW is one of the city's steepest streets with a 28% grade, although this block was never paved. The steep block mostly serves as a pedestrian street with dirt car tracks for residents who need to drive up to their homes.

== Routes ==
The rough boundaries of Phinney Ridge are Aurora Avenue N. (State Route 99) to the east, beyond which lies Green Lake and the eastern half of Woodland Park; N. 75th Street to the north, beyond which lies Greenwood; 8th Avenue N.W. to the west, beyond which lies Ballard, and N. 50th and Market Streets to the south, beyond which lies Fremont and Wallingford. Phinney Ridge's main thoroughfare, which runs atop the ridge south of N. 67th Street, is Phinney Avenue N. North of N. 67th Street, the arterial swings a block to the west and becomes Greenwood Avenue N. The route is lined with many small businesses and shops, as well as the Phinney Neighborhood Association, located at the corner of Phinney and 67th. It has occupied the former John B. Allen Elementary School building, which was built in 1904, since 1981, when the school closed.

== Wildlife ==
Wildlife in the area, especially adjacent to Woodland Park, has always been a subject of discussion; at least two medium-sized (8-15 individuals) coyote packs are known to inhabit the area feeding off the large population of released domestic rabbits that also called the park home until February 2006.
