= Green Lake (Seattle) =

Lake and park in north central Seattle, Washington

- dxʷƛ̕əš
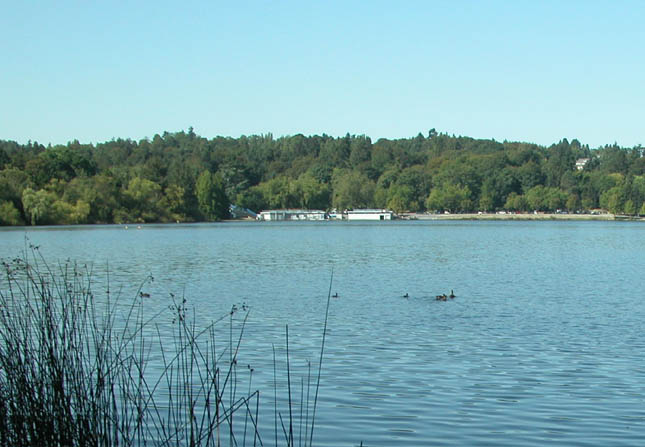
- Looking southwest toward Woodland Park

- Location within Washington (state) Location within the United States

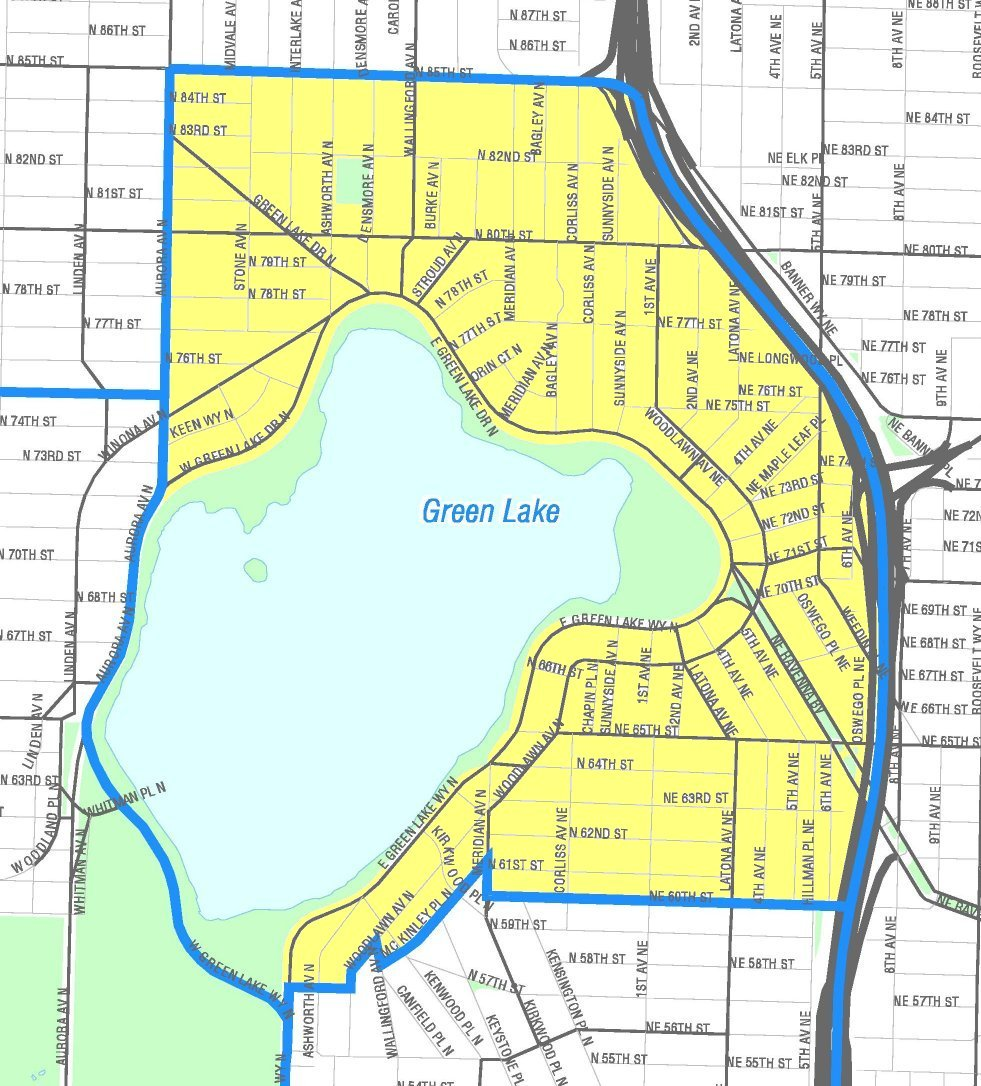
- Map of Green Lake
- Location: Seattle, Washington
- Coordinates: 47.678°N 122.337°W
- Basin countries: United States
- Surface area: 259 acres (1.05 km^{2})
- Average depth: 13 ft (4.0 m)
- Max. depth: 30 ft (9 m)
- Shore length^{1}: 2.8 mi (4.5 km)
- Surface elevation: 160 ft (49 m)
- ^{1} Shore length is not a well-defined measure.

Green Lake (Lushootseed: dxʷƛ̕əš) is a freshwater lake in north central Seattle, Washington, within Green Lake Park. The park is surrounded by the Green Lake neighborhood to the north and east, the Wallingford neighborhood to the south, the Phinney Ridge neighborhood to the west, and Woodland Park to the southwest. It is a glacial lake, its basin having been dug 50,000 years ago by the Vashon glacier, which also created Lake Washington, Union, Bitter and Haller Lakes.

== History ==
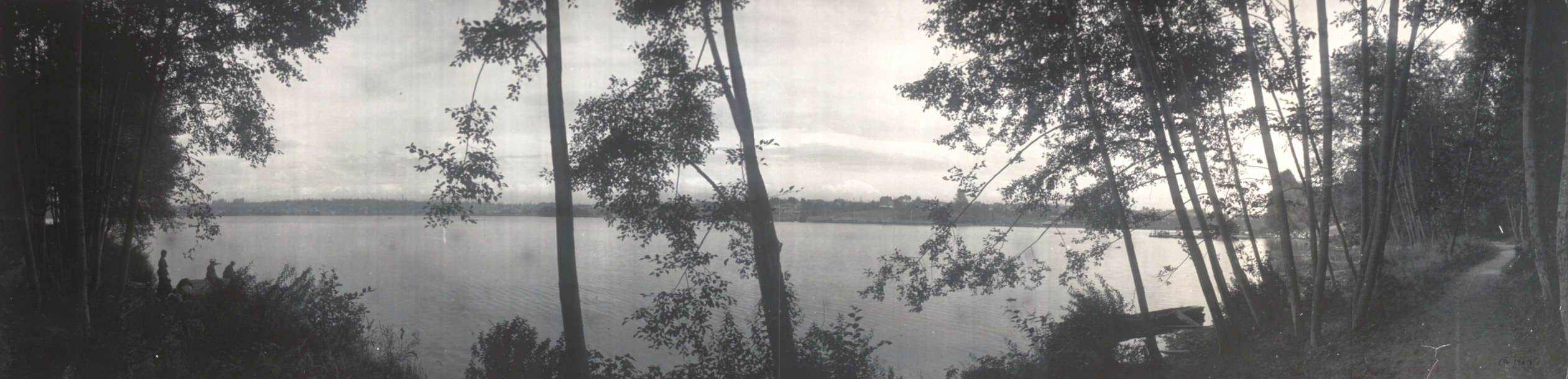
Green Lake in January 1907

Green Lake is called dxʷƛ̕əš in Lushootseed, the native language of Seattle. The etymology of the name is unknown. It was given its English name by David Phillips, who surveyed the area in September 1855 for the United States Surveyor General. His first notes referred to it as "Lake Green" because even in its natural state the lake is prone to algae blooms.

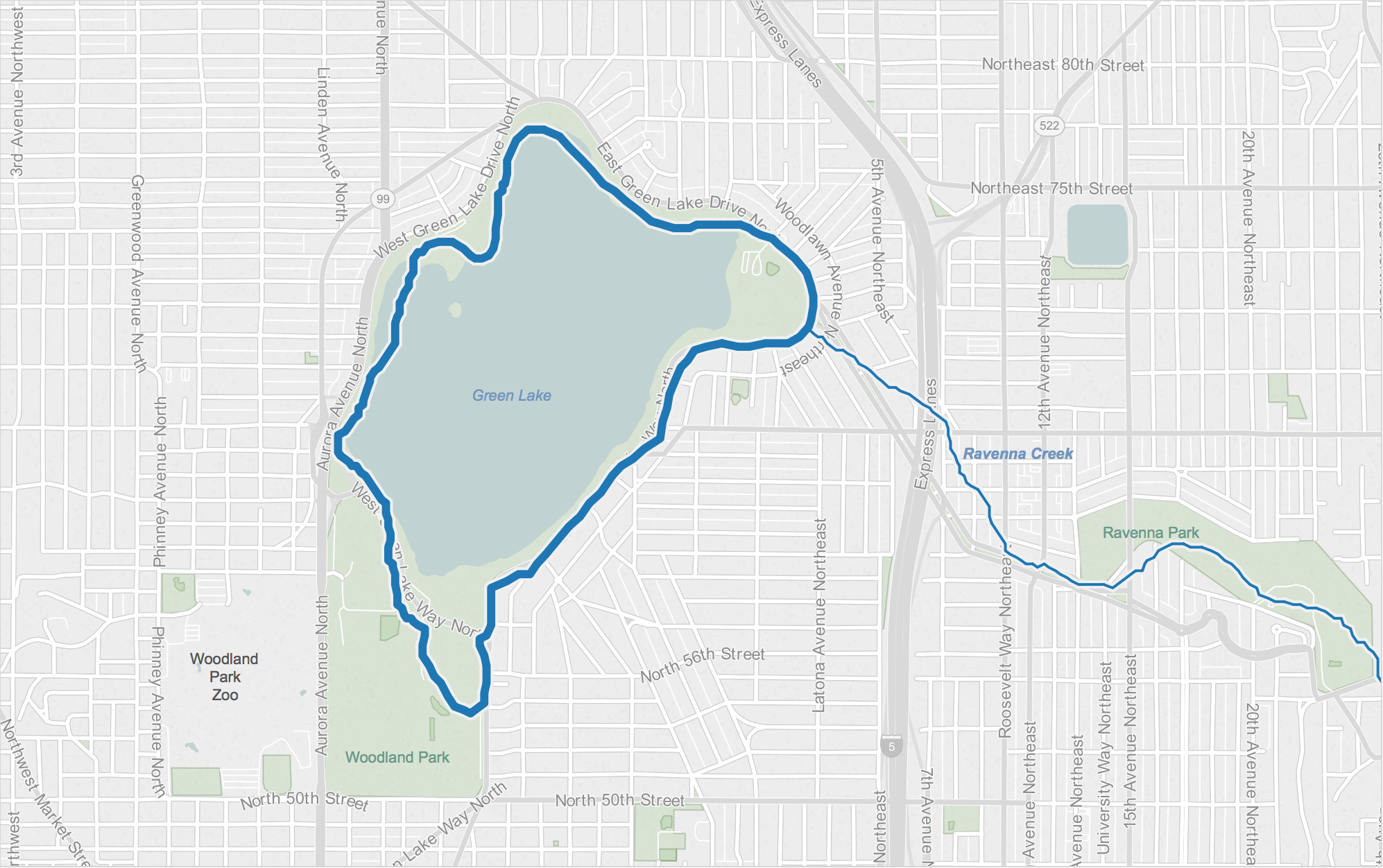
Green Lake in 2015 with blue line showing the shoreline in 1911 before the water level was lowered

The lake has a surface area of 259 acres (1.05 km^{2}), a mean depth of 13 feet (4.0 m), and a maximum depth of 30 feet (9.1 m). The lake has been dredged in order to maintain its depth. Green Lake lacks both surface water inflows and outflows. It once drained into Lake Washington via Ravenna Creek, but in 1911 the water level was lowered by 7 feet (2.1 m) to create parkland, causing the creek to dry up between Green Lake and Cowen Park. Ravenna Boulevard and its wide, grassy median were constructed over the creek bed. The lake is now fed by rainfall, storm runoff, and Seattle's municipal water supply.

The area was originally homesteaded by various pioneers, the first being Erhart Sarfried, "Green Lake John." Sarfried subdivided his homestead in 1888 and sold the land to various entrepreneurs. W.D. Wood built an "amusement park" on the west side of the lake (which never amounted to more than a glorified lawn for picnics). On the east side of the lake, A.L. Parker logged the woods and built a sawmill. Edward C. Kilbourne built the first trolley line connecting the area to the city, the route of which is now Green Lake Way North. The trolley lines kept growing, until by 1910 they extended completely around the lake and a round trip could be made on a separate line going back to the city.

In July 2008, several metal spikes up to 3 feet (0.91 m) in length were found along the bottom of the lake, injuring one person who accidentally stepped on them. The Seattle Parks Department later confirmed that the spikes were from a forgotten pilot program to control the growth of Eurasian water milfoil in Green Lake. The invasive aquatic plant had first appeared in the lake in the early 1980s. In 1984, the Parks Department installed 120,000 square feet (11,000 m^{2}) of black plastic sheeting along the bottom of the lake, using the spikes to hold the sheeting in place. The spikes originally had curved tips to prevent injury, but the tips had corroded and broken off. The city paid a team of divers to remove the remaining spikes in late July 2008. Throughout the course of the investigation, it was revealed that the city had also tried combating the milfoil with weed-eating fish, but hadn't made any serious efforts in the past 15 years aside from occasionally paying divers to pull the weeds by hand.

== Green Lake Park ==
After 1903 the area became part of Seattle's grand Olmsted Plan to create a series of interconnected greenspaces around the entire city. The park design still reflects the Olmsted vision.

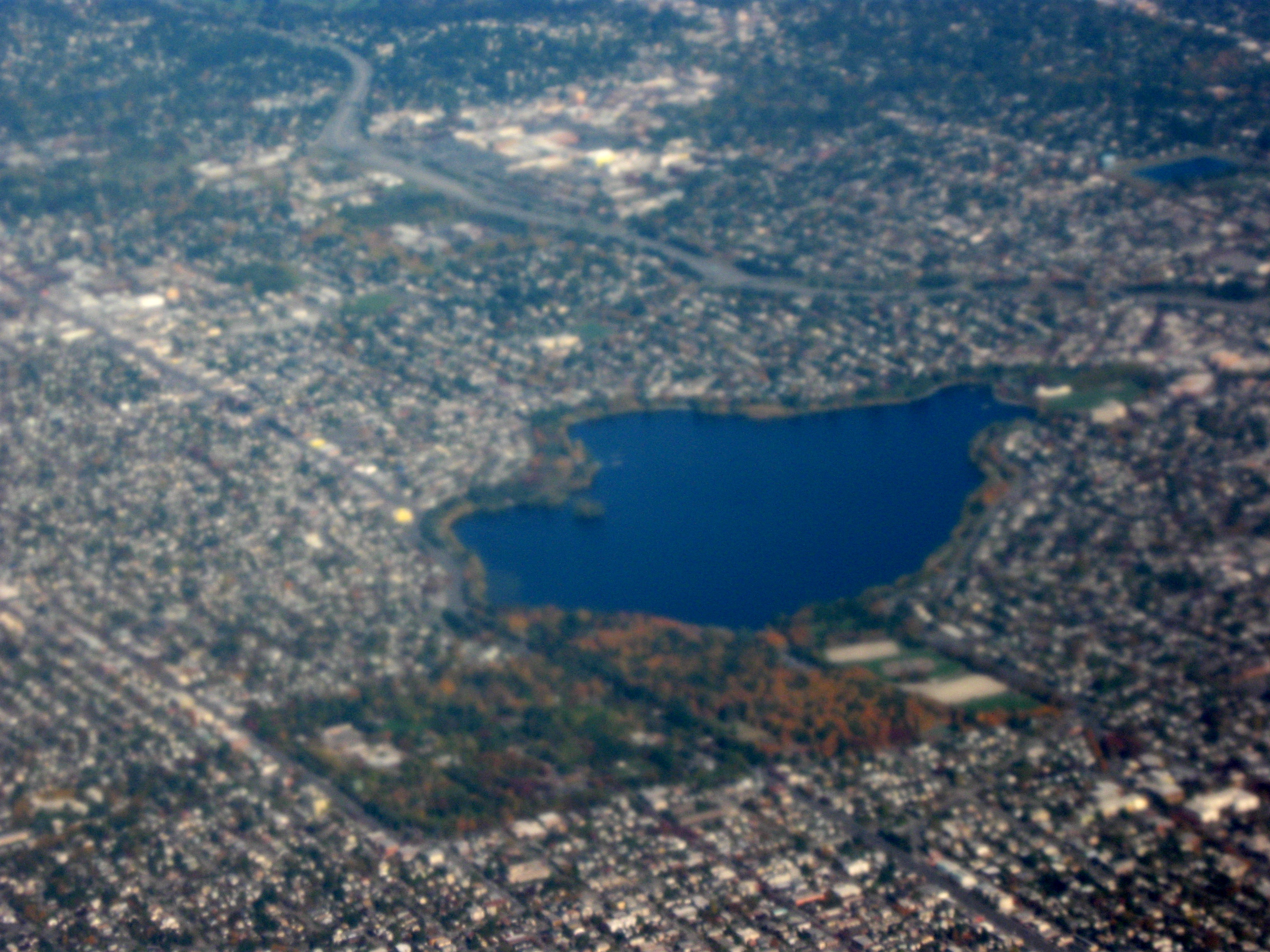
Aerial view of Green Lake from southwest, with Woodland Park at near corner.

Green Lake is surrounded by a 2.8 mi (4.5 km) paved pedestrian pathway. Bicycles, scooters, roller skates, and other wheeled vehicles were barred from using the paved pathway during the COVID-19 pandemic due to high pedestrian use and the construction of new protected bicycle lanes on Green Lake Way. This restriction, made by the Seattle Parks and Recreation department, is currently classified as a "long-term temporary use restriction".

The path attracts people seeking exercise and relaxation, and can be crowded. There is also an outer non-paved 3.2 mi (5.1 km) path along the edge of the park. The park is a popular spot for qigong classes, roller hockey, soccer, baseball, golf, the Derek Baker Memorial Boccie Ball Club, and lawn bowls, part of the Woodland Park Lawn Bowling Club, and a monthly midnight bicycle race.

The bathhouse was built in 1927 next to an outdoor swimming area with concrete steps leading into the water. A lifeguard station with a boat was built next to this area in 1930 after several drownings in 1929. The bathhouse is now home to the Seattle Public Theater at the Bathhouse, a small venue for plays.

Across the lake from the bathhouse, in the northeast part of the park, Green Lake's first community center was built in 1929 at a cost of $95,598. As it was built on the fill land from the 1911 draining, the community center was built on pilings. It contains two conference rooms, a gym with showers and bathrooms, and a stage. Toward the lake, another stepped swimming area was built. The tennis courts were added in 1945. In 1955 a 150,000 gallon (568 cubic meter) swimming pool was added. It was named the Evans Pool in honor of two brothers, Ben and Lou Evans, for their long service to athletics at Seattle parks.

On the east side of the park there is a basketball court, where local National Basketball Association players would occasionally appear for pick-up games in the 1990s.

The children's wading pool was a Works Progress Administration project, as was the drainage ditch and the arched stone bridge providing a path over the ditch. The wading pool is staffed in the summer by the Seattle Parks department, and operates daily from June 23–September 3, from 11 a.m.–8 p.m.

South of the bathhouse is a lawn and fishing pier. Since 1984 this part of the lake has hosted an annual floating lantern memorial dedicated to the victims of the atomic bombings of Hiroshima and Nagasaki and all other victims of war.

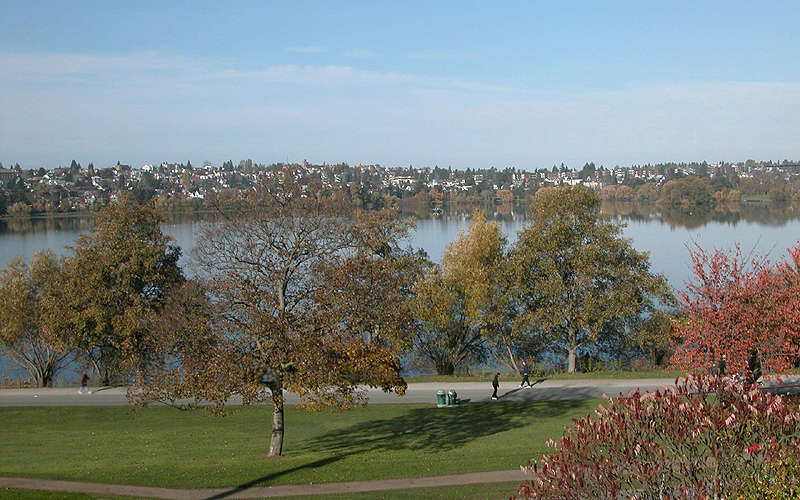
Park and path

Prospect Point, a spit of land that points toward Duck Island, protects a small area of water from high winds. This once was a popular spot for model boats, though model boating is no longer allowed on the lake.

The Green Lake Aqua Theater was built in 1950 for the first Seafair in order to house an attraction called the Aqua Follies and their "swimusicals," a combination of aqua ballet, stage dancing, and comedy. The theater included a round stage and floating (though still recessed below the stage) orchestra pit, encircling a section of the lake with high diving platforms on each side. The grandstand capacity was more than 5,000 seats. The Aqua Follies continued to run during Seafair until 1965. Outside of the Seafair schedule the theater was the stage for plays and musicals whose directors always took advantage of the unique setting. In the summer of 1962, coinciding with the Century 21 Exposition, the Aqua Theater stage was host to a jazz festival, popular performers such as Bob Hope, two plays, and a special presentation of the Aqua Follies with 100 performers. After the World's Fair, summer productions languished, which is usually blamed on Seattle's unpredictable weather, until the Aqua Theater was mostly abandoned. A 1969 concert by the Grateful Dead revealed that the grandstand was crumbling and dangerous. Beginning in 1970 the theater was dismantled, stage right now serving as a pedestrian pier and stage left providing dock and storage for crew shells. Some sections of the grandstand were left in place.

The southwest portion of the park connects with adjoining Woodland Park on land that is also mostly fill, much of which came from the excavation of a route for Aurora Avenue. The southwest portion of the lake once extended to what is now N. 54th Street.

In the summer, Green Lake is also popular for swimming and boating. Although public use of motorized boats has been banned since at least 1968, the lake was the site of hydroplane races from 1929 to 1984. Today many forms of motor-less boats, including sailboarding, pedal boats, rowboats, skiffs, and canoes, are commonly seen on the lake. The Milk Carton Derby is held annually on the lake as one of the opening events of Seafair. While remnants of boat launches still exist, all launches have been removed from the lake; all boats must be hand carried to the water.

The Green Lake Small Craft Center, a Seattle Parks facility, is located on the south end of the lake. It houses both Green Lake Crew and the Seattle Canoe and Kayak Club. From August 10–13, 2006, Green Lake hosted the USRowing Masters National Championship Regatta, which included an estimated 2,000 competitors ranging in age from 23 to 86 years of age.

To the east of the lake across from the park, sits the Green Lake Library, built in 1910 with funds from Andrew Carnegie.

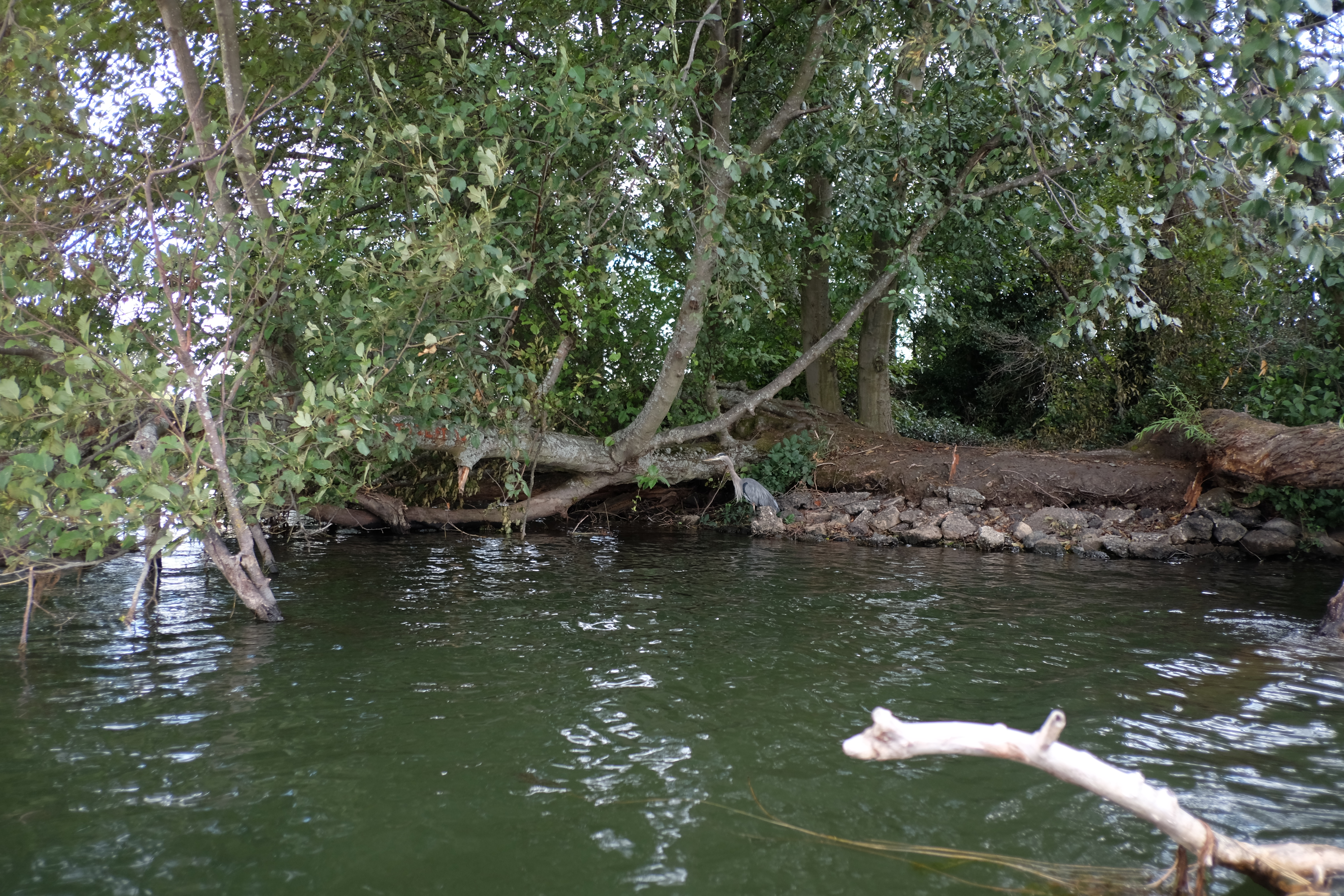
Heron on Duck Island

Within the lake is an artificial island that is commonly called Duck Island but was originally named Swan Island. It was built by the Works Progress Administration in 1936. The island was built (with dumped gravel) as a wildlife sanctuary and later housed some swan gifted to the city by Vancouver, British Columbia. The park board named the island Waldo's Wildlife Sanctuary, after Waldo J Dahl, who took care of the swan. The swans, which were intended to start a small flock, did not have proper breeding habitat around the island. Future attempts to breed swans on the island (at least until the 1970s) were also failures. The state game commission officially made the island a reserve, off limits to people, in 1956. That designation ended in 1983. Though not noted as supporting any unique wildlife, the Washington Department of Fish and Wildlife notes the island is part of a bald eagle management buffer encompassing the south end of the lake. The parks department still considers the island off-limits to people for safety reasons. But there is an occasional presence of rope swings and empty alcohol containers.

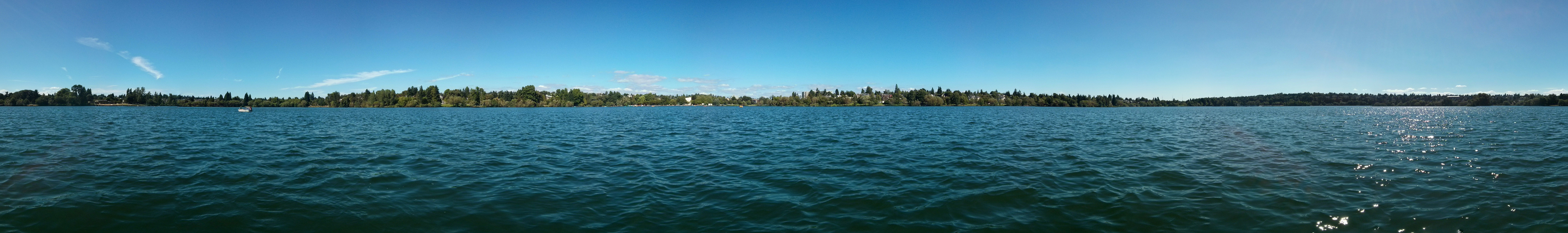
360 degree panorama of Green Lake's shoreline, taken from the middle of the lake

== Green Lake Crew ==
The Green Lake Small Craft Center, which is a Seattle Parks facility, is the training ground for Green Lake Crew, which has a history of successful rowing at the national level.

The Green Lake Small Craft Center also is home to the Seattle Canoe and Kayak Club. This Olympic style sprint paddling also competes at a national level.

== Animal and plant life ==
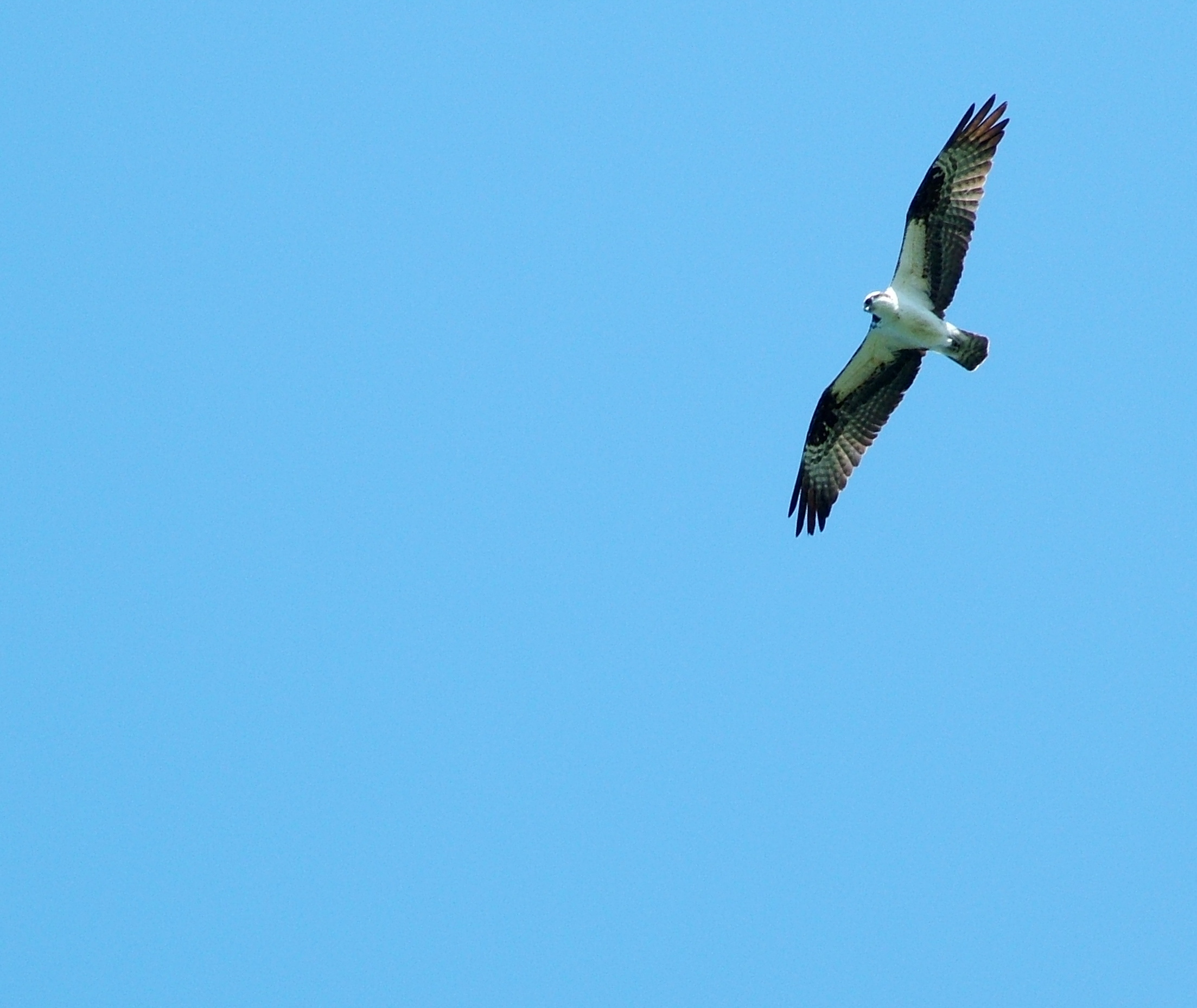
An osprey hunting fish over Green Lake.

Green Lake is a beacon for wildlife. Many types of wildlife, including toads, ducks, cormorants, loons, herons, geese, turtles, raccoons, rats, squirrels, bats, hawks, eagles, and osprey are among the wild creatures commonly viewed there.

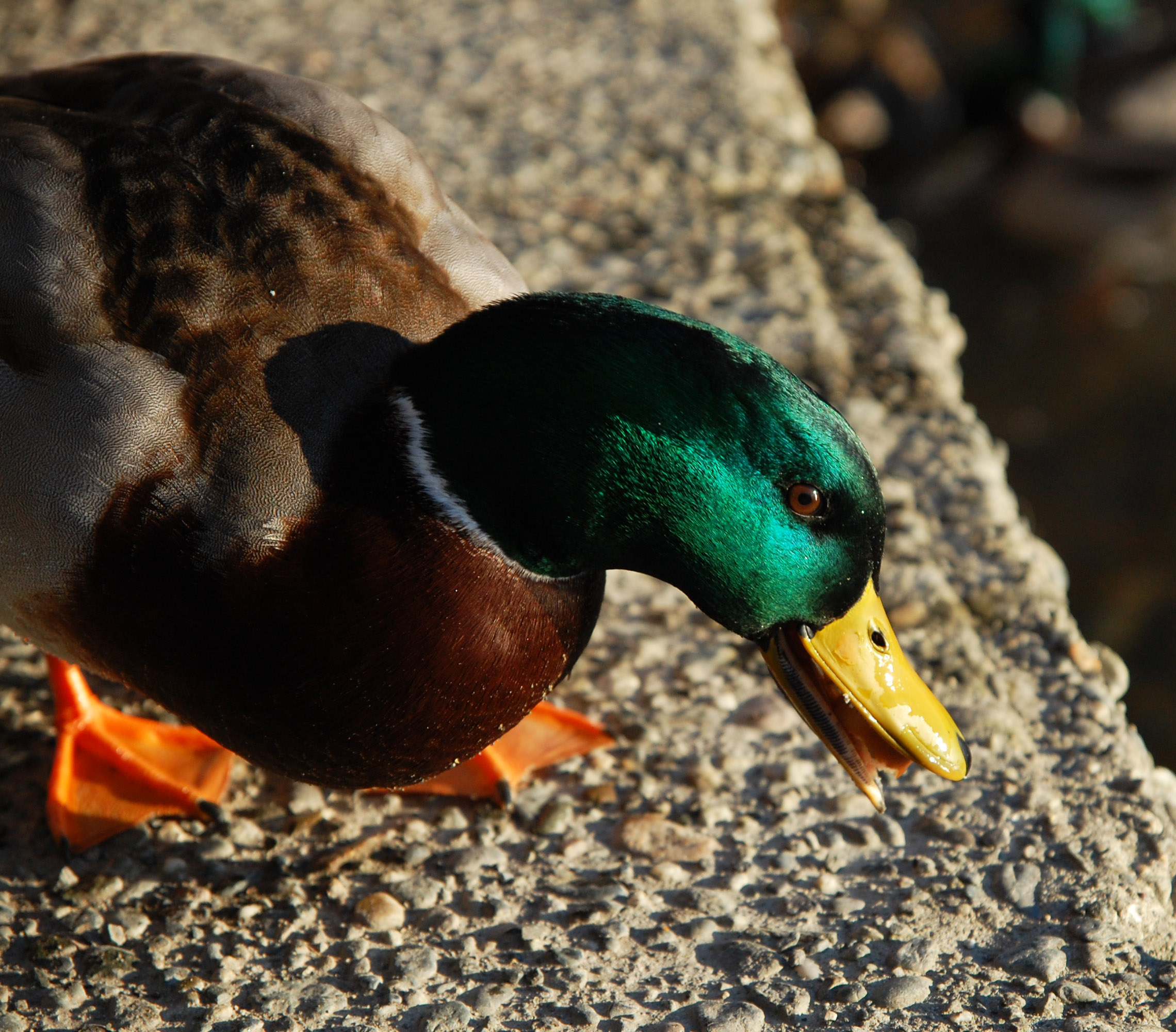
Despite rules against feeding the ducks at Green Lake, this mallard managed to nab some bread from a park goer.

Green Lake is a popular dumping ground for unwanted house pets and developed a large population of feral rabbits. The rabbits created problems by burrowing under streets and retaining walls and into the Woodland Park Zoo. Over the years volunteers adopted or removed the rabbits but not fast enough to keep the population under control. In 2005 the city and zoo combined with the Rabbit Sanctuary to remove all of the rabbits and present an educational outreach campaign to teach people not to abandon rabbits. The practice of abandoning pets into or around Green Lake has resulted in several other non-native species needing removal, mostly ordinary goldfish but including exotic species such as sturgeon and caiman at various times.

Recently, a program has been implemented to substantially reduce the number of ducks and geese. Their droppings raise the level of phosphorus in the lake, leading to excessive growths of algae and milfoil. In 2003 the lake was treated with aluminum sulfate to encapsulate the phosphorus. A paddle boat, moored in the lake, is used to cut the milfoil. The fowl also leave pathogens in the lake which can cause Swimmer's itch. This shows the difficulty of maintaining water quality in a stagnant lake.

Many species of fish live in Green Lake. Trout, mainly rainbow trout, are stocked for recreational fishing. A large population of common carp are present, and can be seen spawning in the shallows in spring. Tiger muskellunge were stocked to control the carp population, as carp are perceived as an invasive species and can contribute to eutrophication. The lake also contains largemouth bass, yellow perch, bluegill, yellow bullhead, channel catfish, and small populations of many different unexpected species.

During the spring, Green Lake Park is in bloom with pink and white cherry trees. Planted along the west side of the lake in 1931 and 1932, they were a gift from the Japanese Association of North America.

== See also ==
- Licton Springs and Pilling's Pond within one mile north of Greenlake, feed spring water into the lake and hosting a shared habitat for waterfowl.
- Green Lake park basketball court on the east side of the lake is featured in the game NBA Street Vol. 2
