= Henry Liebman =

American attorney and businessman

- Born: September 5, 1951 (age 74)
- Education: B.A., political science – University of Washington (1973); J.D. – University of Puget Sound (1980)
- Occupations: real estate investor, attorney

Henry Goodman Liebman (born September 5, 1951) is an American attorney and businessman from Seattle, Washington. Through his company, American Life, Liebman controls a large section of Seattle's industrial SoDo area and has been described as the neighborhood's "900 pound gorilla". Henry Liebman's Noodle Soup, a dish at SoDo's Orient Express restaurant, is named in his honor.

== Early life and education ==
Originally from Florida, Henry Liebman moved to Seattle in 1970 to attend the University of Washington, receiving his undergraduate degree in political science from there in 1973. After a brief stint as a tapestry salesman, he earned a Juris Doctor from the University of Puget Sound in 1980.

== Career ==
=== Early career ===
According to Liebman, he early worked as a tax specialist for Touche Ross and Company before moving to practice law at, first, Franklin and Watkins and, then, Franco, Asia, Bensussen. As a partner at Liebman-Mimbu and Coe-Nordwall-Liebman, Liebman added immigration and real estate law to his practice. During this time he also founded Northwest International Bank, and served on its board of directors.

=== American Life ===
In 1996 Liebman founded American Life, a company that facilitates EB-5 visas, a U.S. government program which offers green cards to non-U.S. citizens willing to invest $1 million or more into American businesses. Under the American Life business model, its clients would invest money in Seattle real estate and receive 70 percent of the returns their investments generated from rent, with American Life keeping the rest. By the early 2000s, through American Life, Liebman controlled large swaths of real estate in Seattle's SoDo neighborhood, a fact which reportedly made city officials, area businesses, and labor leaders "nervous". In 2007, Knute Berger described Liebman as the "900 pound gorilla" of SoDo. By 2011, Liebman's company had brought in $700 million in foreign real estate investments into Seattle. In 2016 American Life was fined $1 million for using unlicensed advisers to direct aspiring EB-5 applicants into Liebman projects; Liebman himself was fined $240,000. As part of the settlement, neither American Life nor Liebman admitted wrongdoing.

== Personal life ==
Liebman is chief executive officer of the Washington State Panda Foundation, which leads efforts to import giant pandas into Washington state for exhibition purposes. The project requires a ten-year panda renting agreement at $1,000,000 per year.

A dish called "Henry Liebman's Noodle Soup" is a menu item at the Seattle Chinese restaurant The Orient Express. Named in tribute to Liebman, it was described by the Seattle Weekly as "the most mysterious dish" on the restaurant's menu. However, Liebman himself has said he hates the soup.

In 2013, Liebman caught what was believed to be a 200-year-old shortraker rockfish while fishing in Alaska. The catch was heralded by media as the oldest rockfish ever caught. It was later, however, dated to 64 years of age.
