= Edward C. Kilbourne =

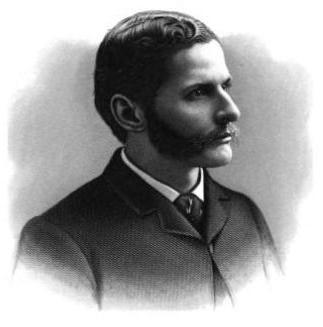
Kilbourne circa 1890

Edward Corliss Kilbourne (January 13, 1856 in St. Johnsbury, Vermont–1959) was the founder of the Seattle public electricity system.

Kilbourne was born in Vermont in 1856 and was raised in Aurora, Illinois. He lived in Colorado before moving out to Seattle where he had been preceded by his uncle Corliss P. Stone. Kilbourne was trained as a dentist but became active in numerous other fields of endeavor.

Together with his uncle Corliss P. Stone he was the developer of city of Fremont, annexed in 1891 to become a neighborhood of Seattle. He was a pioneer in urban mass transit having founded a horse trolley line.

He was the founder of the first electric railway in Seattle. He and his uncle Corliss Stone were among the founders of the Union Electric Company. After it was acquired by the city Kilbourne became superintendent of the Seattle Lighting Department, a municipal electricity system, later Seattle City Light. He also supported the YMCA after the original backer Dexter Horton had withdrawn his support and was involved with the Plymouth Congregational Church of Seattle.
