= Beth's Cafe =

Restaurant in Seattle, Washington, U.S.

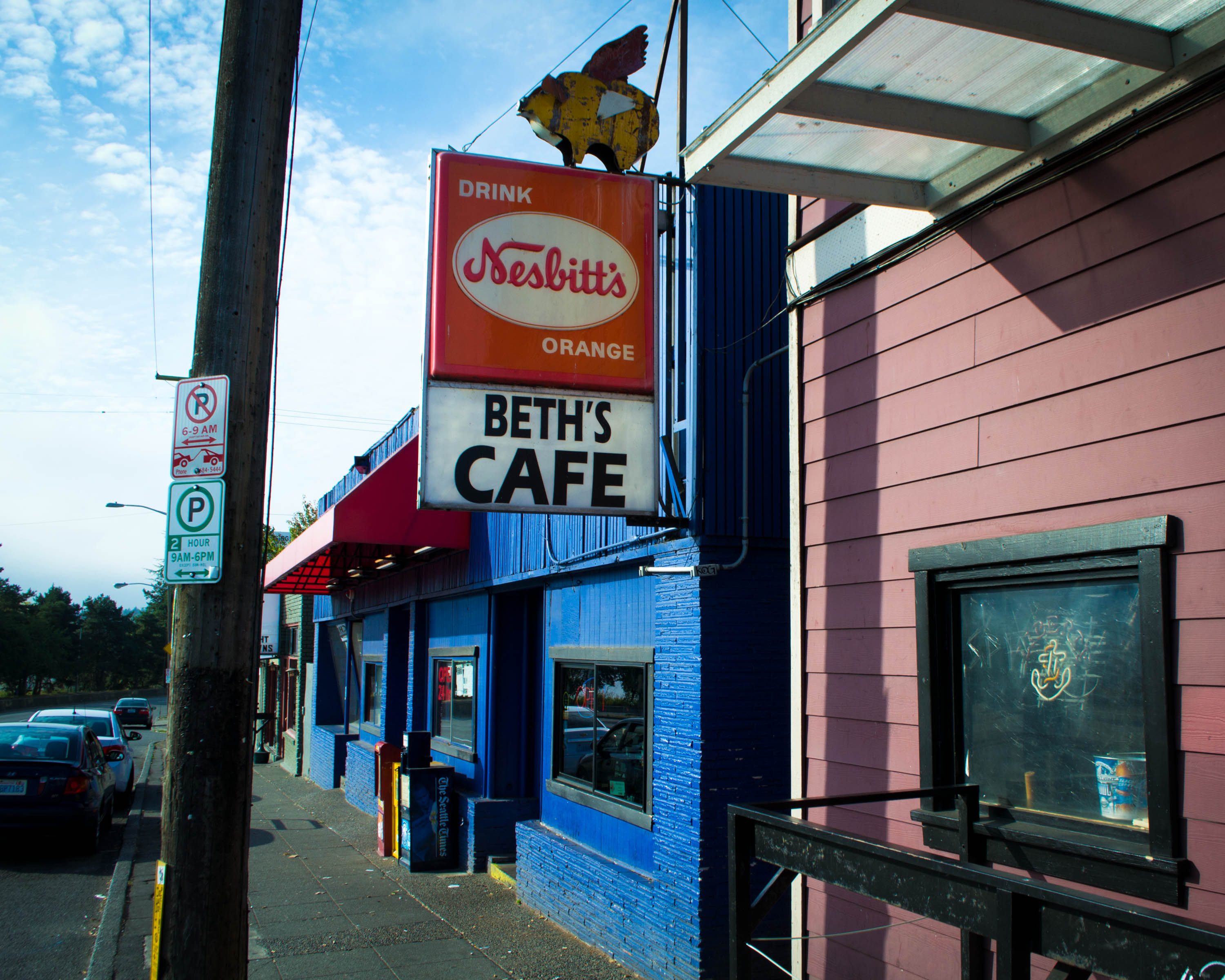
- The front entrance to Beth's Cafe on Aurora Avenue
- Interactive map of Beth's Cafe

Restaurant information
- Established: 1954; 72 years ago
- Owner: Mason Reed
- Food type: Greasy spoon
- Location: 7311 Aurora Avenue North; Seattle, Washington, U.S., 98103
- Coordinates: 47°40′56″N 122°20′41″W
- Website: bethscafe.com

Beth's Cafe is a restaurant in Seattle, Washington, United States. Located on Aurora Avenue North in the Green Lake neighborhood, it is known largely for its "greasy spoon" cuisine and large portions. Beth's opened in 1954 and has remained at the same location since, under various owners. It closed in 2021 but reopened in 2023.

A 24-hour establishment, Beth's Cafe is popular among Seattle residents during late-night hours. The walls are covered with crayon drawings made by customers, which are taken down and archived each January to make room for new ones. The restaurant and its "Southwestern Exposure" 12-egg omelette challenge were featured in a 2009 episode of Man v. Food. The cafe had also been noted in Seattle guidebooks by Lonely Planet and Moon Publications among others.

== History ==
In 1954, Beth's Cafe was opened by Beth and Harold Eisenstadt. It started out as a nickel slot gambling parlor but transformed into a restaurant to keep customers around.

On June 1, 1998, the cafe had to be temporarily shut down after some cardboard in a dumpster behind the restaurant unexpectedly caught fire and caused substantial structural damage.

In 2002, Chris Dalton answered a classified ad selling Beth's and became the latest owner of the breakfast eatery. After Dalton's purchase, Beth's started to add home-baked goods, many previously frozen and canned ingredients were switched over to fresh ingredients (such as meats, chili, corned beef hash, etc.), and vegetarian options became available. Beth's is famous for its wide array of breakfast food, accounting for 80 percent of its business. Beth's runs through more than 450,000 eggs per year. In 2014, Beth's celebrated its sixtieth anniversary with weekly specials that included 1950s pricing and hosted a 1950s-themed party.

Beth's was put up for sale in 2019 so that Dalton could focus on treatment for stage four pancreatic cancer, but no buyer was found. Dalton died in April 2020. Beth's closed in October 2020 due to occupancy restrictions enforced during the COVID-19 pandemic. The restaurant briefly re-opened on July 8, 2021, under the management of Hazel Dalton, closing again two months later. It re-opened on February 1, 2023, with limited hours, closing at 3 or 5 p.m.

As of September 2026, the establishment is open 24 hours, including holidays.

== 12 egg omelette ==
Beth's Cafe is well known for its 12-egg omelette; the restaurant and this menu item are listed in 1,000 Places to See in the USA and Canada Before You Die and other books. There are six varieties of their omelettes, with the "Triple Bypass", a mixture of bacon, sausage, ham, and two types of cheese, being the most popular. The 12-egg omelettes are served on a pizza tray with all-you-can-eat hash browns and toast and are intended for sharing. Prizes are not awarded for finishing the 12-egg omelette.

In a 2009 episode of Man v. Food, host Adam Richman took part in the 12-egg omelette challenge. Richman and a previous omelette challenge winner competed to finish a Southwestern Exposure 12-egg omelette (filled with cheddar, sour cream, salsa, and brisket chili). Richman and his competitor could not finish the omelette. After the Man vs. Food episode aired there was a significant rise in business that sometimes resulted in an hour and a half wait times for patrons.
