= Green Lake, Seattle =

Neighborhood in Seattle, Washington

Coordinates: 47°40′49″N 122°19′40″W

Green Lake
- Seattle Neighborhood
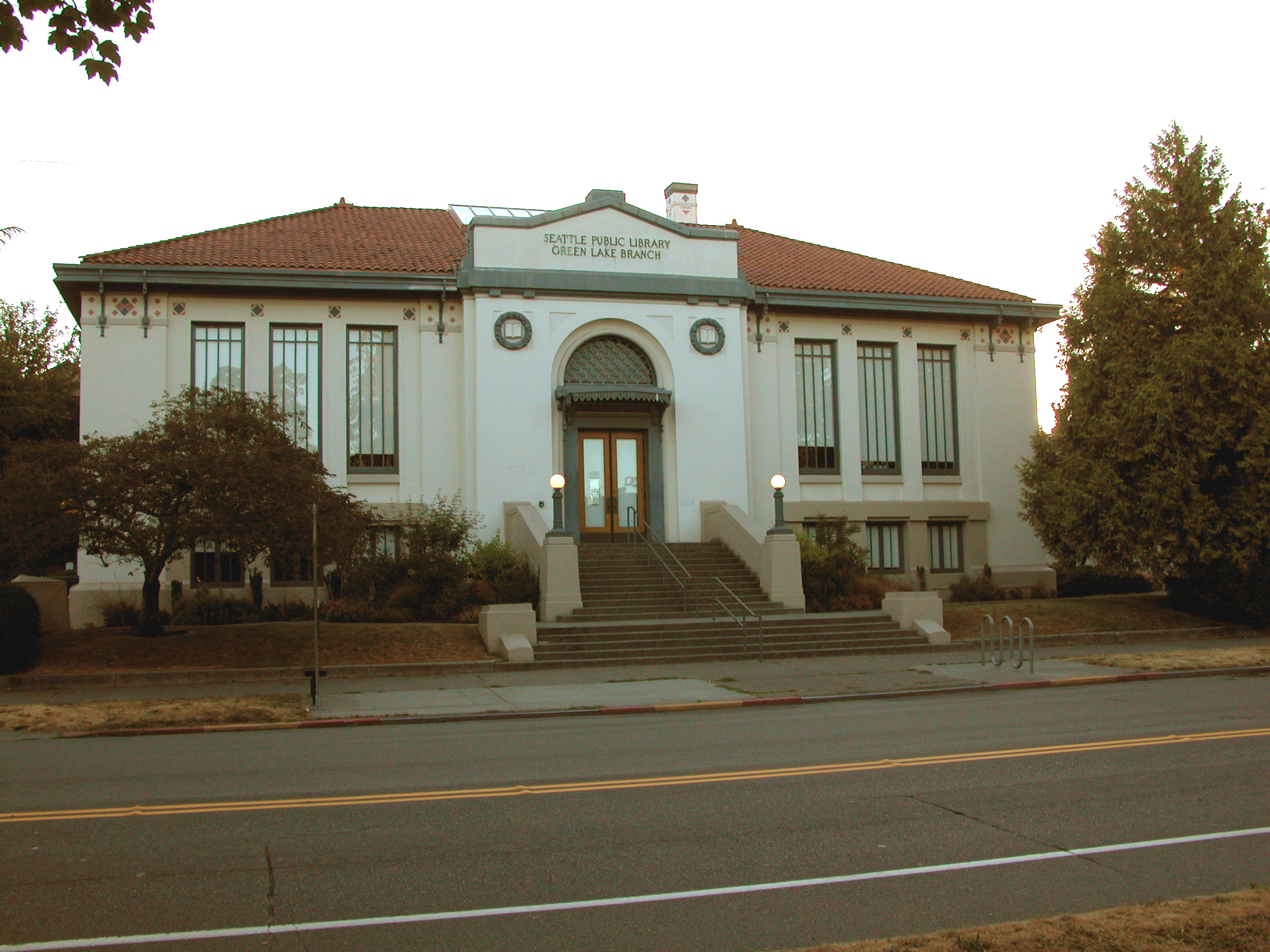
- Green Lake Branch of the Seattle Public Library

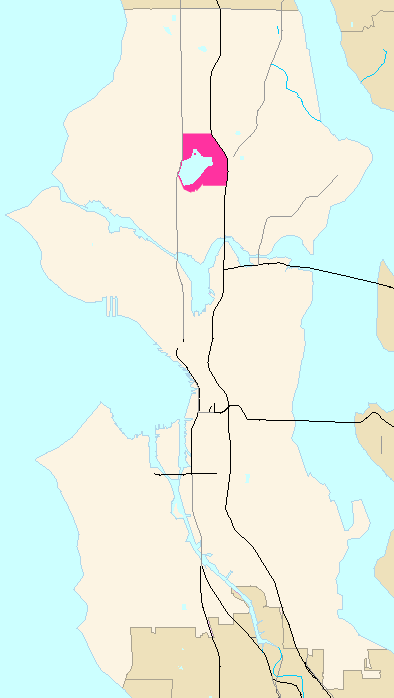
- Map of Green Lake's location in Seattle
- Country: United States
- State: Washington
- City: Seattle
- City Council: District 6
- Neighborhood Council: Northwest District
- Police District: North Precinct, J3
- Legislative District: 43rd, 46th
- First Settled: 1869
- Founded by: Erhart Seifried
- Named after: Green Lake

Area
  - Total: 2.32 sq mi (6.0 km^{2})

Population
  - Total: 17,516
  - Density: 7,550/sq mi (2,920/km^{2})
- ZIP code: 98103, 98115

Green Lake is a neighborhood in north central Seattle, Washington. Its centerpiece is the lake and park after which it is named.

Its generally accepted boundaries are Interstate 5 to the east, beyond which lie Roosevelt and Maple Leaf; N 85th Street to the north, beyond which lies the neighborhood North College Park/Licton Springs; Aurora Avenue N (State Route 99) to the west, beyond which lies Phinney Ridge and Greenwood, and N 60th Street and Woodland Park to the south, beyond which lies Wallingford.

Its main thoroughfares are the circumferential road around the lake, known at different points as East Green Lake Way N, East Green Lake Drive N, West Green Lake Drive N, Aurora Avenue N, and West Green Lake Way N; N 65th, N 71st, and N 80th Streets (east- and westbound); Wallingford Avenue N and 1st, 5th, Latona, and Woodlawn Avenues NE (generally north- and southbound but following the contours of the shoreline at some points); Green Lake Drive N and NE Ravenna Boulevard (northwest- and southeast-bound); and Winona Avenue N (northeast- and southwest-bound).

David Phillips surveyed the Green Lake area in September 1855 for the United States Surveyor General. The first settler was Erhart Seifried with a 132-acre (0.53 km^{2}) homestead on the northeast shore of the lake in 1869. In 1891 a trolley line was extended from Fremont along the eastern shore and around the northern end of Green Lake. Also in 1891, Green Lake was annexed to Seattle.

There is an extensive variety of housing types in Green Lake. Since 1995, the neighborhood has undergone significant redevelopment. Many houses have been completely remodeled and enlarged, often with the addition of another floor. This is a consequence of Green Lake's easy access to Downtown via both Interstate 5 and Aurora Avenue N.

The Green Lake Library, a Carnegie library that occupies 5,000 square feet (460 m^{2}) and cost $35,000 to build, was opened in 1910. In 1999 the library held 54,000 catalogued items. It is part of the Seattle Public Library system.

Prior to the 1991 redistricting, Green Lake formed the center of Washington's 32nd Legislative District. The well-organized and rather left-leaning Democratic Party organization of that district was widely known both to friend and foe alike as "the Soviet of Green Lake", possibly an allusion to James Farley's legendary (though possibly apocryphal) 1930s remark "there are 47 States in the Union, and the Soviet of Washington".

Green Lake is home to Green Lake Elementary School, Daniel Bagley Elementary School, Bishop Blanchet High School, and Seattle Parks and Recreation Department's Green Lake Small Craft Center (GLSCC). GLSCC is the site of both Green Lake Crew, a public rowing program, and the Seattle Canoe and Kayak Club.

There is also a 2.8-mile path around the lake for runners, bikers, skaters and walkers. Many others use the athletic fields or visit the park for boating, picnics and swimming.

== Landmarks ==
Green Lake Library is an officially designated Seattle landmark. Other, unofficial landmarks include:

- Beth's Cafe a notable restaurant in the Green Lake neighborhood since 1954
- Colson House is a historic house constructed in 1904 by Charles and Sophie Colson.
