= List of parks in Seattle =

The city of Seattle, Washington, is home to hundreds of parks of various classifications.

== National parks ==
Seattle contains one area administered by the National Park Service.

Name	Image	Established	Location	Size	Description
Klondike Gold Rush National Historical Park		1976	Pioneer Square		This is one of four units that make up the national historical park. The other three are in Skagway, Alaska.

== City parks ==
Seattle's city parks are administered by Seattle Parks and Recreation, a city department. Several bike and pedestrian trails are maintained by the Seattle Department of Transportation or administered jointly by both departments. A number of waterfront parks are administered by the Port of Seattle, a municipal corporation.

Seattle's oldest park is Denny Park and its largest is Discovery Park. This list has only the notable parks.

Name	Image	Established	Location	Size	Description
Alki Beach Park		1907	West Seattle	135.9 acres (55.0 ha)	
Alvin Larkins Park		1975	Madrona		
Beer Sheva Park		1905	Rainier Beach		Originally named Atlantic City Park, it was renamed after Beer Sheva, Israel in 1977.
Bryant Playground		1978	Bryant/View Ridge	3.1 acres (1.3 ha)	
Burke–Gilman Trail		1978		27 miles (43 km)	Jointly maintained with Seattle Department of Transportation.
Cal Anderson Park		1901	Capitol Hill	7.37 acres (2.98 ha)	
Carkeek Park			Broadview	216 acres (87 ha)	
Cascade Playground			Cascade		
Chief Sealth Trail		2007		3.6 miles (5.8 km)	Maintained by Seattle Department of Transportation.
City Hall Park		1916	Pioneer Square	1.3 acres (0.53 ha)	
Colman Park		1907	Mount Baker	24.3 acres (9.8 ha)	
Cowen Park		1906	Ravenna	8.4 acres (3.4 ha)	Contiguous with Ravenna Park.
Denny Park		1883	South Lake Union		Seattle's oldest park, it was completely flattened in the Denny Regrade in 1930.
Denny-Blaine Park			Denny-Blaine		
Discovery Park		1973	Magnolia	534 acres (216 ha)	
Dr. Jose Rizal Park		1979	Beacon Hill	9.6 acres (3.9 ha)	
East Montlake Park			Montlake		
Fairview Park			Eastlake	0.8 acres (0.32 ha)	
Fauntleroy Park		1971	Fauntleroy	32.9 acres (13.3 ha)	
Freeway Park		1976	Downtown/First Hill	5.2 acres (2.1 ha)	
Fremont Peak Park		2007	Fremont	0.5 acres (0.20 ha)	
Frink Park		1906	Leschi	17.2 acres (7.0 ha)	
Gas Works Park		1975	Wallingford	19.1 acres (7.7 ha)	
Genesee Park			Rainier Valley	57.7 acres (23.4 ha)	
Golden Gardens Park			Ballard, Seattle	87.8 acres (35.5 ha)	
Green Lake Park		1903	Green Lake		
Hamilton Viewpoint		1954	West Seattle	16.9 acres (6.8 ha)	
Hing Hay Park		1973	Chinatown-International District	0.64 acres (0.26 ha)	
Hoa Mai Park		2024	Little Saigon, Chinatown–International District	0.27 acres (0.11 ha)	Pocket park
I-5 Colonnade		2005	Capitol Hill/Eastlake	7.5 acres (3.0 ha)	This park is located under Interstate 5.
Interlaken Park			Capitol Hill/Montlake	51.7 acres (20.9 ha)	
Jack Block Park		2001	West Seattle	15 acres (6.1 ha)	Maintained by the Port of Seattle.
Jackson Park		1928	Haller Lake/Northgate/Lake City	160.7 acres (65.0 ha)	
Jefferson Park		1908	Beacon Hill	52.4 acres (21.2 ha)	
Kerry Park		1927	Queen Anne	1.26 acres (0.51 ha)	
Kinnear Park		1892-94	Queen Anne	14.1 acres (5.7 ha)	
Kiwanis Ravine			Magnolia	8.7 acres (3.5 ha)	
Kobe Terrace			Chinatown-International District	1 acre (0.40 ha)	
Kubota Garden		1927	Rainier Beach	20 acres (8.1 ha)	It has been a public park since 1987.
Lake City Beach Park			Cedar Park	0.084 acres (0.034 ha) land; 0.315 acres (0.127 ha) including water	
Lake People Park		2005	Columbia City	0.5 acres (0.20 ha)	
Lake Union Park		2010	South Lake Union	12 acres (4.9 ha)	
Lakeview Park			Denny-Blaine	4.5 acres (1.8 ha)	
Leschi Park			Leschi	18.5 acres (7.5 ha)	
Licton Springs		1960	Licton Springs	6.3 acres (2.5 ha)	
Lincoln Park			West Seattle	135 acres (55 ha)	
Louisa Boren Park		1913	Capitol Hill	7.2 acres (2.9 ha)	
Madison Park			Madison Park	8.3 acres (3.4 ha)	
Madrona Park			Madrona	31.2 acres (12.6 ha)	
Magnuson Park		1977	Sand Point	350 acres (140 ha)	Originally called Carkeek Park and occupied by the United States Navy from 1922-1975.
Matthews Beach Park		1951	Matthews Beach	22 acres (8.9 ha)	
McCurdy Park (former)			Montlake	1.5 acres (0.61 ha)	
Me-Kwa-Mooks Park		1994	West Seattle	20.2 acres (8.2 ha)	
Meridian Playground			Wallingford		The site features a building called the Good Shepherd Center, which is listed on the National Register of Historic Places as the Home of the Good Shepherd.
Montlake Playfield		1935	Montlake	27 acres (11 ha)	
Myrtle Edwards Park			Belltown	4.8 acres (1.9 ha)	
North Passage Point Park		1977	Northlake	0.8 acres (0.32 ha)	
Northacres Park			Haller Lake	20.7 acres (8.4 ha)	
Occidental Park		1971	Pioneer Square	0.6 acres (0.24 ha)	
Oxbow Park			Georgetown		
Peace Park		1990	University District		
Ravenna Park			Ravenna	49.9 acres (20.2 ha)	Contiguous with Cowen Park.
Roanoke Park		1908	Capitol Hill/Portage Bay	2.2 acres (0.89 ha)	
Schmitz Park		1908	West Seattle	53.1 acres (21.5 ha)	
Seattle Center		1962	Lower Queen Anne	74 acres (30 ha)	Administered by the Seattle Center Department, a city department.
Seattle Japanese Garden		1960	Madison Park	3.5 acres (1.4 ha)	
Seward Park		1911	Seward Park	300 acres (120 ha)	
South Passage Point Park		1977	Eastlake	0.9 acres (0.36 ha)	
Terry Pettus Park			Eastlake	0.9 acres (0.36 ha)	
Tilikum Place			Belltown		
Victor Steinbrueck Park		1970	Downtown	0.8 acres (0.32 ha)	
Viretta Park			Denny-Blaine	1.8 acres (0.73 ha)	
Volunteer Park		1901	Capitol Hill	48.3 acres (19.5 ha)	
Washington Park Arboretum		1934	Montlake/Madison Valley/Washington Park	230 acres (93 ha)	Jointly administered by Seattle Parks and Recreation, the University of Washington, and the Arboretum Foundation.
Waterfront Park			Central Waterfront		
Westlake Park		1988	Downtown	0.1 acres (0.040 ha)	
West Montlake Park		1909	Montlake		
Woodland Park		1902	Phinney Ridge/Green Lake	90.9 acres (36.8 ha)	Site of Woodland Park Zoo, and contiguous with Green Lake Park.

== Other non-profit parks ==
A number of parks are operated by educational institutions or other non-profit organizations.

Name	Image	Established	Location	Size	Description
Carl S. English Jr. Botanical Gardens			Ballard		Part of the Hiram M. Chittenden Locks, operated by the United States Army Corps of Engineers.
Olympic Sculpture Park		2007	Belltown	9 acres (3.6 ha)	Operated by the Seattle Art Museum.
South Seattle College Arboretum			West Seattle		
Union Bay Natural Area		1972	University District	50 acres (20 ha)	Administered by University of Washington Botanic Gardens.
Woodland Park Zoo			Phinney Ridge		Operated by a non-profit organization.

== Private parks ==
Private individuals and organizations maintain a number of parks which are open for use by the public.

Name	Image	Established	Location	Size	Description
Streissguth Gardens		1962	Capitol Hill		
Waterfall Garden Park		1978	Pioneer Square		

== Other ==
Name	Image	Established	Location	Size	Description
O.O. Denny Park		1922	47.71°N 122.248611°W	46 acres (19 ha)	Owned by Seattle since its inception, but currently managed by the city of Kirkland.

== All Seattle parks ==
Parks administered by Seattle Parks and Recreation.

1. 12th Ave. Square Park
2. 12th West & West Howe Park
3. 14th Avenue NW Boat Ramp
4. 3001 E Madison Park
5. 32nd Ave W Boat Launch
6. 6th Avenue NW Pocket Park
7. A. B. Ernst Park
8. Adams Street Boat Ramp
9. Albert Davis Park
10. Alice Ball Park
11. Alki Beach Park
12. Alki Playground
13. Alvin Larkins Park
14. Amy Yee Tennis Center Park
15. Andover Place
16. Arroyos Natural Area
17. Atlantic City Boat Ramp
18. Atlantic Street Park
19. B.F. Day Playground
20. Bagley Viewpoint
21. Baker Park on Crown Hill
22. Ballard Commons Park
23. Ballard Corners Park
24. Ballard Playground
25. Bar-S Playground
26. Bayview Playground
27. Bayview-Kinnear (Lower Kerry Park)
28. Beacon Hill Playfield
29. Beacon Place
30. Beer Sheva Park
31. Bell Street Park
32. Bellevue Place
33. Belltown Cottage Park
34. Belmont Place
35. Belvedere Park
36. Belvoir Place
37. Benefit Playground
38. Benvenuto Viewpoint
39. Bergen Place
40. Bhy Kracke Park
41. Bitter Lake Playfield
42. Bitter Lake Reservoir Open Space
43. Blaine Place
44. Blue Dog Pond
45. Blue Ridge Circle
46. Blue Ridge Places
47. Boren Park
48. Boren Place
49. Boylston Place
50. Bradner Gardens Park
51. Brighton Playfield
52. Broadway Hill Park
53. Bryant Neighborhood Playground
54. Burke-Gilman Playground Park
55. Burke-Gilman Trail
56. Cal Anderson Park
57. California Place
58. Camp Long
59. Carkeek Park
60. Carleton Center
61. Carleton Highlands
62. Cascade Place
63. Cascade Playground
64. Cayton Corner Park
65. Cedar Park
66. Charles Richey Sr Viewpoint
67. Cheasty Boulevard
68. Cheasty Natural Area
69. Cheshiahud Lake Union Loop
70. Chinook Beach Park
71. Christie Park
72. City Hall Park
73. Cleveland Playfield
74. Coe Play Park
75. College Street Park
76. College Street Ravine
77. Colman Park
78. Colman Playground
79. Columbia Park
80. Commodore Park
81. Corliss Place
82. Cormorant Cove
83. Cottage Grove Park
84. Counterbalance Park
85. Cowen Park
86. Crescent Place
87. Crown Hill Glen
88. Crown Hill Park
89. Daejeon Park
90. Dahl Playfield
91. Dakota Place Park
92. David Rodgers Park
93. Day Street Boat Ramp
94. Dearborn Park
95. Delridge and Myrtle Park
96. Delridge Playfield
97. Denny Blaine Lake Park
98. Denny Park
99. Denny Blaine Park
100. Discovery Park
101. Dr. Blanche Lavizzo Park
102. Dr. Jose Rizal Park
103. Don Armeni Boat Ramp
104. Donnie Chin International Childrens Park
105. Duwamish Waterway Park
106. E.C. Hughes Playground
107. East Duwamish Greenbelt
108. East Montlake Park
109. East Portal Viewpoint
110. East Queen Anne Playground
111. Eastmont Place
112. Eddie Vine Boat Ramp
113. Ella Bailey Park
114. Emma Schmitz Memorial Overlook
115. Endolyne Park
116. Ercolini Park
117. Fairmount Playground
118. Fairview Park
119. Fairview Walkway
120. Fauntleroy Creek Ravine
121. Fauntleroy Park
122. Fauntleroy Place
123. Ferdinand Street Boat Launch
124. Firehouse Mini Park
125. First Hill Park
126. Fletcher Place
127. Flo Ware Park
128. Freeway Park
129. Fremont Canal Park
130. Fremont Peak Park
131. Frink Park
132. Fritz Hedges Waterway Park
133. Froula Playground
134. Garfield Playfield
135. Gas Works Park
136. Gemenskap Park
137. Genesee Park and Playfield
138. Georgetown Playfield
139. Georgetown Pump Station
140. Gerber Park
141. Gilman Playground
142. Golden Gardens Park
143. Grand Army of the Republic Cemetery
144. Green Lake Park
145. Greenwood Park
146. Greenwood Triangle
147. Greg Davis Park
148. Haller Lake Street End
149. Hamilton Viewpoint Park
150. Harrison Ridge Greenbelt
151. Harvard-Miller/Roanoke Annex
152. Herring's House Park
153. Hiawatha Playfield and Community Center
154. Highland Drive Parkway
155. Highland Park Playground
156. Highland Place
157. Hing Hay Park
158. Hitt's Hill Park
159. Homer Harris Park
160. Horiuchi Park
161. Horton Hill Corridor
162. Howell Park
163. Hubbard Homestead
164. Hunter Boulevard
165. Hutchinson Playground
166. Hyde Place
167. I-5 Colonnade
168. Interbay Athletic Complex
169. Interlaken Park
170. Inverness Ravine Park
171. Japanese Garden
172. Jefferson Park
173. Jimi Hendrix Park
174. John C. Little, Sr. Park
175. Judge Charles M. Stokes Overlook
176. Judkins Park and Playfield
177. Julia Lee’s Park
178. Junction Plaza
179. Katie Black's Garden
180. Kerry Park
181. Keystone Place
182. Kilbourne Park
183. Kinnear Park
184. Kinnear Place
185. Kirke Park
186. Kiwanis Memorial Preserve Park
187. Kobe Terrace
188. Kubota Garden
189. Lake City Memorial Triangle
190. Lake City Mini Park
191. Lake People Park
192. Lake Union Park
193. Lake Washington Boulevard
194. Lakeridge Park
195. Lakeridge Playfield
196. Lakeview Park
197. Lakeview Place
198. Lakewood Playground
199. Lakewood Triangle
200. Lambert Place
201. Landing Parkway
202. Lawton Park
203. Laurelhurst Playfield
204. Leschi-Lake Dell Natural Area
205. Leschi Park
206. Licton Springs Park
207. Lewis Park
208. Lincoln Park
209. Linden Orchard Park
210. Little Brook Park
211. Llandover Woods Greenspace
212. Lowman Beach Park
213. Longfellow Creek Natural Area
214. Loyal Heights Playfield
215. Lynn Street Mini Park
216. MacLean Park
217. Madison Park
218. Madison Park North Beach
219. Madrona Briar Patch
220. Madrona Park
221. Madrona Playground
222. Madrona Ravine
223. Magnolia Boulevard
224. Magnolia Greenbelt
225. Magnolia Manor Park
226. Magnolia Park
227. Magnolia Playfield
228. Magnolia Tidelands Park
229. Magnuson Park
230. Maple Leaf Reservoir Park
231. Maple School Ravine
232. Maple Wood Playfield
233. Marra-Desimone Park
234. Marshall Park
235. Martha Washington Park
236. Martin Luther King Jr. Civil Rights Memorial Park
237. Marvin's Garden
238. Matthews Beach Park
239. Mayfair Park
240. McGilvra Boulevard
241. McGilvra Place
242. McGraw Square
243. Meadowbrook Playfield
244. Me-Kwa-Mooks Natural Area
245. Me-Kwa-Mooks Park
246. Meridian Playground
247. Miller Playfield
248. Miller Triangle
249. Mineral Springs Park
250. Mock Creek Ravine
251. Montlake Boulevard
252. Montlake Playfield
253. Morgan Junction
254. Mount Baker Boulevard
255. Mount Baker Park
256. Mount Claire Park
257. Mt Baker Ridge Viewpoint
258. Myrtle Edwards Park
259. Myrtle Reservoir
260. Nantes Park
261. Nathan Hale Playfield
262. NE 60th Street Park
263. NE 130th Street End
264. Nora's Woods
265. North Beach Park
266. North Passage Point
267. Northacres Park
268. Northeast Queen Anne Greenbelt
269. Northgate Park
270. Northlake Park
271. Northwest 60th Viewpoint
272. Observatory Courts
273. Occidental Square
274. Olympic Sculpture Park
275. Open Water Park
276. Orchard Street Ravine
277. Othello Playground
278. Oxbow Park
279. Park Home Circle
280. Parkmont Place
281. Parsons Gardens Park
282. Peace Park
283. Pelly Place Natural Area
284. Peppi's Playground
285. Piers 62 and 63
286. Pigeon Point Park
287. Pinehurst Playground
288. Pinehurst Pocket Park
289. Pioneer Square
290. Pipers Creek Natural Area
291. Plum Tree Park
292. Plymouth Pillars Park
293. Powell Barnett Park
294. Pratt Park
295. Prefontaine Place
296. Prentis I. Frazier Park
297. Pritchard Island Beach
298. Puget Boulevard Commons
299. Puget Creek Greenspace
300. Puget Park
301. Puget Ridge Playground
302. Queen Anne Boulevard
303. Queen Anne Bowl Playfield
304. Rainbow Point
305. Rainier Beach Playfield
306. Rainier Beach Urban Farm and Wetlands
307. Rainier Place
308. Rainier Playfield
309. Ravenna Boulevard
310. Ravenna Park
311. Ravenna Ravine
312. Ravenna Woods
313. Ravenna-Eckstein Park
314. Regrade Park
315. Riverview Playfield
316. Roanoke Park
317. Roanoke Street Mini Park
318. Rogers Playground
319. Ross Playground
320. Rotary Viewpoint
321. Roxhill Park
322. Sacajawea Playground
323. Salmon Bay Park
324. Sam Smith Park
325. Sandel Playground
326. Schmitz Boulevard
327. Schmitz Preserve Park
328. Seacrest Park
329. Seola Park
330. Seven Hills Park
331. Seward Park
332. Sierra Place
333. Smith Cove Park
334. Solstice Park
335. Soundview Playfield
336. Soundview Terrace
337. South Park Meadow
338. South Park Playground
339. South Passage Point
340. Spring Street Mini Park
341. Spruce Street Mini Park
342. St. Marks Greenbelt
343. Stan Sayres Memorial Park
344. Stevens Place
345. Stevens Triangle
346. Sturgus Park
347. Sturtevant Ravine
348. Summit Place
349. Summit Slope Park
350. Sunnyside Ave N Boat Ramp
351. Sunset Hill Park
352. Sunset Place
353. SW Queen Anne Greenbelt
354. T.T. Minor Playground
355. Tashkent Park
356. Taylor Creek Headwaters
357. Terry Pettus Park
358. Thayer Place
359. Thomas C. Wales Park
360. Thomas Street Mini Park
361. Thorndyke Park
362. Thornton Creek Natural Area
363. Thyme Patch Park
364. Tilikum Place
365. Troll’s Knoll Park
366. Trolley Hill Park
367. Trudy's Triangle
368. Twelfth Avenue South Viewpoint
369. Union Bay Boglands
370. Union Station Square
371. University Circle
372. University Heights Plaza
373. University Lake Shore Place
374. University Playground
375. Urban Triangle Park
376. Ursula Judkins Viewpoint
377. Van Asselt Playground
378. Victor Steinbrueck Park
379. Victory Creek Park
380. Victory Heights Playground
381. View Ridge Playfield
382. Viretta Park
383. Virgil Flaim Park
384. Volunteer Park
385. Volunteer Parkway
386. Wallingford Playfield
387. Wallingford Steps
388. Walt Hundley Playfield
389. Ward Springs Park
390. Washington Park Arboretum
391. Washington Park Playfield
392. Washington Street Boat Landing
393. Waterfront Park
394. Waterway 19
395. Watton Site
396. Webster Park
397. Wedgwood Square
398. West Duwamish Greenbelt
399. West Ewing Mini Park
400. West Montlake Park
401. West Queen Anne Playfield
402. West Seattle Stadium
403. Westcrest Park
404. Westlake Greenbelt
405. Westlake Park
406. Westlake Square
407. William Grose Park
408. Williams Place
409. Wolf Creek Ravine Natural Area
410. Woodland Park
411. Woodland Park Rose Garden
412. Yesler Terrace Park
413. York Park
414. York Playground

== All Port of Seattle parks ==
- Bridge Gear Park
- Centennial Park (formerly Elliott Bay Park)
- Duwamish River People’s Park and Shoreline Habitat
- Seattle Fishermen's Memorial.
- həʔapus Village Park and Shoreline Habitat (formerly Terminal 107 Park)
- Jack Block Park (formerly Terminal 5 Park)
- Salmon Cove Park and Shoreline Habitat (formerly Turning Basin #3)
- sbəq̓ʷaʔ Park and Shoreline Habitat (formerly Terminal 108/Diagonal Park)
- t̓ałt̓ałucid Park and Shoreline Habitat (formerly 8th Ave. South Park)
- Terminal 115 Public Access
- Terminal 18 Park
- Terminal 91 Bike Trail (part of the Elliott Bay Trail)
- t̓uʔəlaltxʷ Village Park and Shoreline Habitat (formerly Terminal 105 Park)

== See also ==
- List of Olmsted parks in Seattle
- Shoreline street ends in Seattle
- The Beach at Expedia Group
