= List of eponymous places in Seattle =

This is a list of eponymous places in Seattle, focusing on public spaces.

== Parks ==
Park	Named after	Year (re)named	Location	Notes
Alice Ball Park	Alice Ball	2019	Greenwood	Ball was born in Seattle and invented the most effective leprosy treatment of the early 1900s. She was also the first woman, and Black person, to get a master's from the University of Hawai'i.
Alvin Larkins Park	Alvin Larkins	1979	Madrona	Larkins was a jazz musician, choir director, and music teacher in Seattle.
Betty Bowen Viewpoint	Betty Bowen	1977	Queen Anne	Bowen was a founding member of the Seattle Arts Commission, assistant director for the Seattle Art Museum, and journalist.
Bill Wright Golf Complex	Bill Wright	2024		Wright was a professional golfer and also the first Black person to win the US Amateur Public Links Championship. He learned to play at this course and was a member of Fir State Golf Club there.
Cal Anderson Park	Cal Anderson	2003	Capitol Hill	Anderson was an activist and the first openly gay Washington legislator.
Carkeek Park	Morgan James Carkeek and Emily Gaskill Carkeek	1929	Broadview	Morgan was a contractor and stonemason, and the Carkeeks donated money to purchase Piper's Canyon for use as a park named after them.
Cayton Corner Park	Horace Cayton Sr. and Susie Revels Cayton	2014	Capitol Hill	The Caytons ran The Seattle Republican and led community organizations. They were early Black residents of Seattle.
Cheasty Natural Area	Edward C. Cheasty			Cheasty was a Seattle Park Board member.
Cheryl Chow Park	Cheryl Chow	2025	Rainier Valley	Chow was a Seattle City Council member who helped support parks, recreation, and school programs.
Danny Woo Community Garden	Danny Woo	1987	C-ID	Woo owned the parkland originally and leased it to Bob Santos for $1 a year for use as a community garden for neighborhood seniors. It was named for him after his death.
Denny Park	David Denny	1887		Denny and his wife Louisa were some of Seattle's early white settlers, and donated this area from their land claim for Seattle's first municipal cemetery.
Detective Cookie Chess Park	Detective Denise "Cookie" Bouldin	2022	Rainier Beach	Bouldin is a longtime member of the Seattle Police Department and runs a chess club and anti-violence programs for youth.
Donnie Chin International Children's Park	Donnie Chin	2016	C-ID	Chin founded the International District Emergency Center as a teenager and was a community activist and mentor.
Dr. Blanche Lavizzo Park	Dr. Blanche Lavizzo	1991		Lavizzo was the first Black woman pediatrician in Washington.
Dr. Jose P. Rizal Park	José Rizal	1974	Beacon Hill	Filipino activists and immigrants in Seattle campaigned to name a street after Rizal as a heroic symbol of Filipino civic engagement. The park and bridge were renamed together.
Flo Ware Park	Flo Ware	1982		Ware was a Seattle community activist for healthcare and education.
Fritz Hedges Waterway Park	Frederick "Fritz" Hedges	2020	Portage Bay	Hedges was a longtime Seattle Parks and Recreation employee, serving as their Director of Policy, Planning, and Evaluation.
Homer Harris Park	Dr. Homer E. Harris	2002	Central District	Harris was a Seattle dermatologist and football player, the first Black captain of a Big Ten football team.
Jimi Hendrix Park	Jimi Hendrix	2006	Central District	Hendrix was a famous guitarist and rock musician who grew up in the Central District.
Jim Ellis Freeway Park	Jim Ellis			Ellis was a community activist who advocated for local parks and led the campaign to create this park on top of an I-5 lid.
John C. Little, Sr. Park	John C. Little, Sr.	2004	NewHolly	Little co-founded the Central Area Youth Association and was a Seattle community activist, often serving youth.
Judge Charles M. Stokes Overlook	Charles Moorehouse Stokes	1998	I-90 lid	Stokes was the first Black legislator from King County and first Black judge on the King County District Court.
Kerry Park	Albert Sperry Kerry			Kerry and his wife Katherine donated this park's land to the city for its view. Kerry was a lumberman and had been president of the Seattle Park Board.
Kubota Garden	Fujitaro Kubota	1927		Kubota was a professional gardener and Japanese immigrant who created this garden and introduced Japanese gardening techniques to Seattle.
Leschi Park	Chief Leschi			Leschi was a chief of the Nisqually Tribe who objected to the Treaty of Medicine Creek and fought in the Yakima War. He often visited the area where this park was created.
Louisa Boren Park	Louisa Boren Denny	1914	Capitol Hill	Denny and her husband David were some of Seattle's early white settlers. She served on the first King County Jury to include women.
Martin Luther King, Jr. Civil Rights Memorial Park	Martin Luther King Jr.	1991		King was a civil rights leader who had spoken in Seattle. Activist Eddie Rye Jr. campaigned to rename Martin Luther King Jr. Way for King, and this park was created as a memorial.
Myrtle Edwards Park	Myrtle Edwards	1976		Edwards was a Seattle City Council member and chaired the city's parks committee. She led two local Leagues of Women Voters.
Powell Barnett Park	Powell Barnett	1969		Barnett was a Seattle civil rights and community activist.
Pratt Park	Edwin T. Pratt	1976		Pratt founded the Central Area Motivation Program and Seattle Opportunities Industrialization Center.
Prentis I. Frazier Park	Prentis I. Frazier	1983	Central District	Frazier was a businessman who supported Black entrepreneurship and founded the Seattle Enterprise. The park is behind his house.
Sam Smith Park	Sam Smith	1998	I-90 lid	Smith was Seattle's first Black city councilmember.
Victor Steinbrueck Park	Victor Steinbrueck	1985		Steinbrueck was a Seattle architect who led the campaign to preserve Pike Place Market and helped design this park.
Terry Pettus Park	Terry Pettus	1985	Lake Union	Pettus was a Seattle journalist and activist for waterway environmental protection and houseboat communities.
Ursula Judkins Viewpoint	Ursula Judkins			Judkins was an advocate for parks and environmentalism in the Magnolia neighborhood.
Walt Hundley Playfield	Walter R. Hundley	2013		Hundley was the first Black superintendent of Seattle Parks and Recreation and led the acquisition of this park.
Warren G. Magnuson Park	Warren G. Magnuson	1977		Magnuson was a U.S. senator who helped the city acquire this park after its previous use as a Naval Air Station.
William Grose Park	William Grose	1983		Grose was an early Seattle settler, helping found the First African Methodist Episcopal church in Seattle and starting the Central District.

== Buildings ==
Building	Named after	Year (re)named	Location	Notes
Amy Yee Tennis Center	Amy Woo Yee	2002		Yee was a championship-winning tennis player who was inducted into the U.S. Tennis Association's Pacific Northwest Hall of Fame. She taught free lessons and expanded the sport in Seattle.
Helene Madison Pool	Helene Madison			Madison was an Olympic gold medalist and world record holder in swimming. She learned at Green Lake.
Langston Hughes Performing Arts Institute	Langston Hughes	1974	Central District	Hughes was a poet and Harlem Renaissance leader. He had visited Seattle and spoken about its racial history.
Medgar Evers Pool	Medgar Evers	1970		Evers was a U.S. civil rights leader whose assassination in 1963 spurred support for the Civil Rights Act of 1964.
Wing Luke Museum	Wing Luke	1966	C-ID	Luke was a civil rights activist and the first person of color elected to the Seattle City Council, as well as the first Chinese American elected to office in King County.

== Pathways ==
=== Bridges ===
Bridge	Named after	Year (re)named	Location	Notes
Dr. Jose P. Rizal Bridge	José Rizal	1974	C-ID, Beacon Hill	Filipino activists and immigrants in Seattle campaigned to name a street after Rizal as a heroic symbol of Filipino civic engagement. The bridge and park were renamed together.
John Lewis Memorial Bridge	John Lewis	2021	Northgate	Lewis was a national civil rights leader. City councilmember Debora Juarez campaigned for the bridge to be named after him to increase recognition of people of color, who are underrepresented in the city's names.
Joe Desimone Bridge	Giuseppe "Joe" Desimone		Pike Place Market	Desimone was a local farmer who began visiting the market in the 1910s. He became president of the company that owned the market in the 1930s and ran it until his death in the 1940s.

=== Trails ===
Bridge	Named after	Year (re)named	Location	Notes
Burke–Gilman Trail	Thomas Burke, Daniel Gilman		Seattle, Kenmore	Burke and Gilman ran the Seattle, Lake Shore and Eastern Railway, whose tracks eventually became the trail.
Cheshiahud Loop	Cheshiahud		Lake Union	Cheshiahud was the chief of a Duwamish village on Lake Union. He also worked as a guide on the lake when white settlers arrived there.
Chief Sealth Trail	Chief Sealth	2007	Beacon Hill, NewHolly	Sealth was Seattle's namesake and a leader in the Duwamish community.
