= Puget Park =

Park in Seattle, Washington, United States

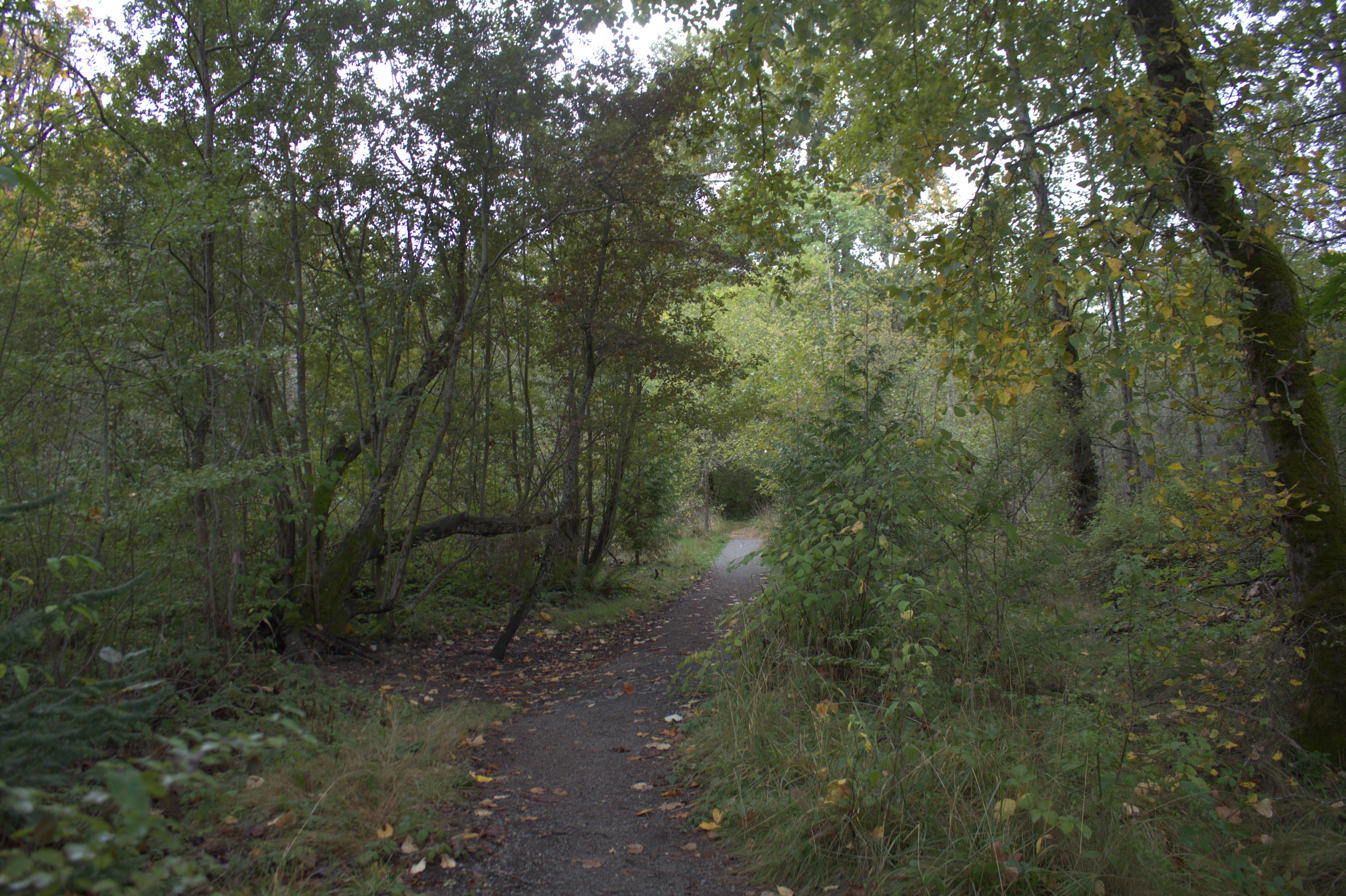
- A trail in Puget Park, Seattle, near Pigeon Point.
- Interactive map of Puget Park
- Type: Urban Park
- Location: Seattle, Washington
- Coordinates: 47°33′35.775″N 122°21′25.704″W
- Established: 1912; 114 years ago
- Operated by: Seattle Parks and Recreation

Puget Park is a part of the West Duwamish Greenbelt east of West Seattle. The Greenbelt encompasses the forest on the eastern slopes of West Seattle.

In 1912, the park land was given to the city by the Puget Mill Company. The Seattle Parks Board designated the space as Puget Park. However, the space was designated as an undeveloped area for many years after that, with minimal maintenance.

In recent years, several Seattle youth groups have been allowed to build and maintain bridges and trails in the park.
