= Hoa Mai Park =

Park in Seattle, Washington, U.S.

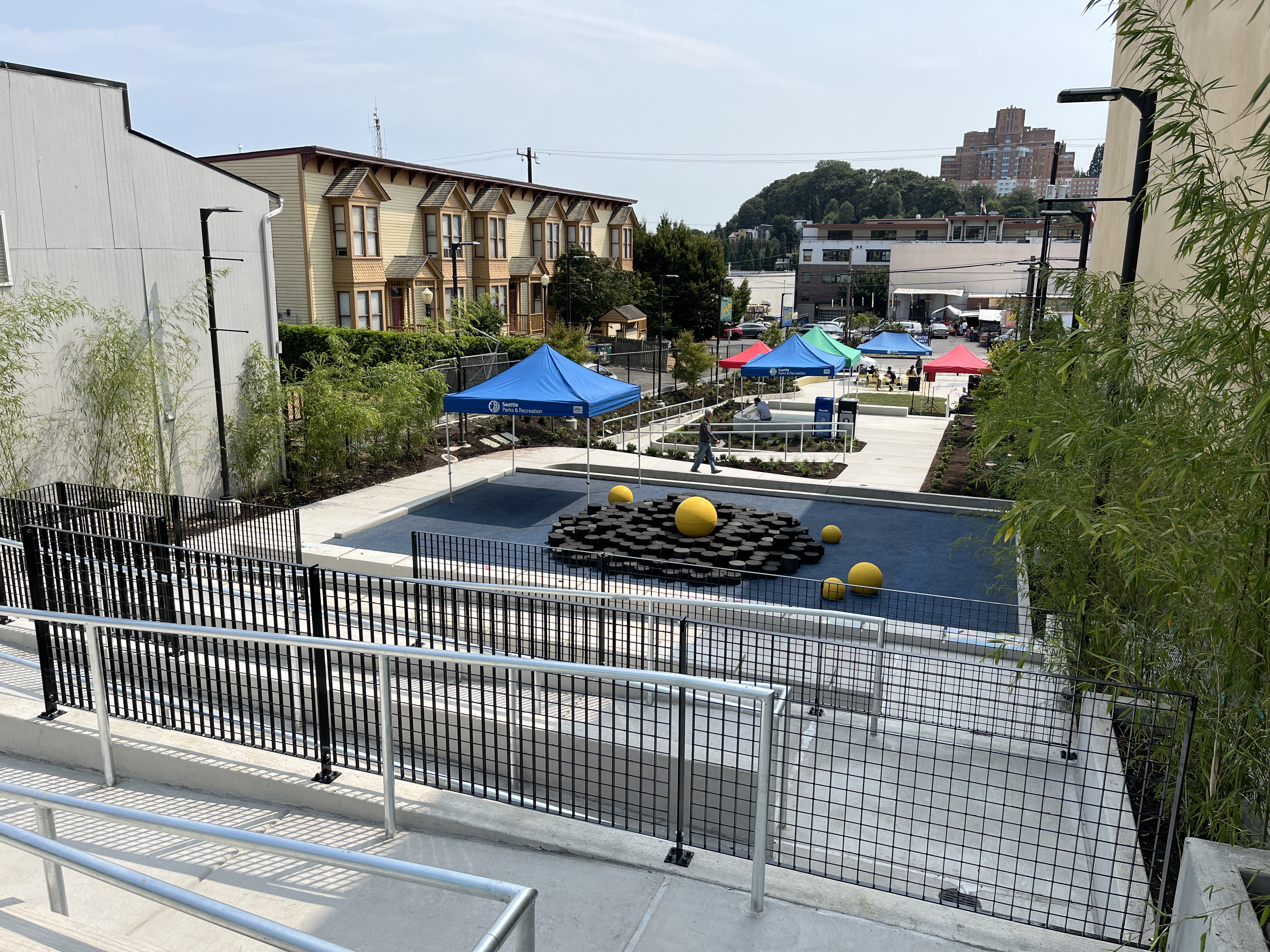
- The park in 2024
- Interactive map of Hoa Mai Park
- Location: Seattle, Washington, U.S.
- Coordinates: 47.5988°N 122.3160°W
- Area: .27 acres (0.11 ha)
- Opened: July 27, 2024
- Operator: Seattle Parks and Recreation

Hoa Mai Park is a public pocket park in the Little Saigon part of Seattle's Chinatown–International District, in the U.S. state of Washington. The .27-acre (0.11 ha) green space opened on July 27, 2024.

== Description and history ==
The .27-acre (0.11 ha) green space between Jackson and King Streets is operated by Seattle Parks and Recreation. It cost approximately $3.5 million to develop. The park's opening in July 2024 was attended by mayor Bruce Harrell and featured a lion dance. Hoa Mai Park is patrolled by park rangers and hosts buskers.

The Jackson Street entrance has a monumental sculpture by artist Kalina Chung called Through. The park also has bamboo, flowers, and trees. There is also a playground, an area for events and performances, and permanent light fixtures.

In March 2025, the park was closed and gates installed to deal with criminal activity and drug use in the park.

== See also ==
- List of parks in Seattle
