= Yesler Terrace Park =

Public park in Seattle, Washington, U.S.

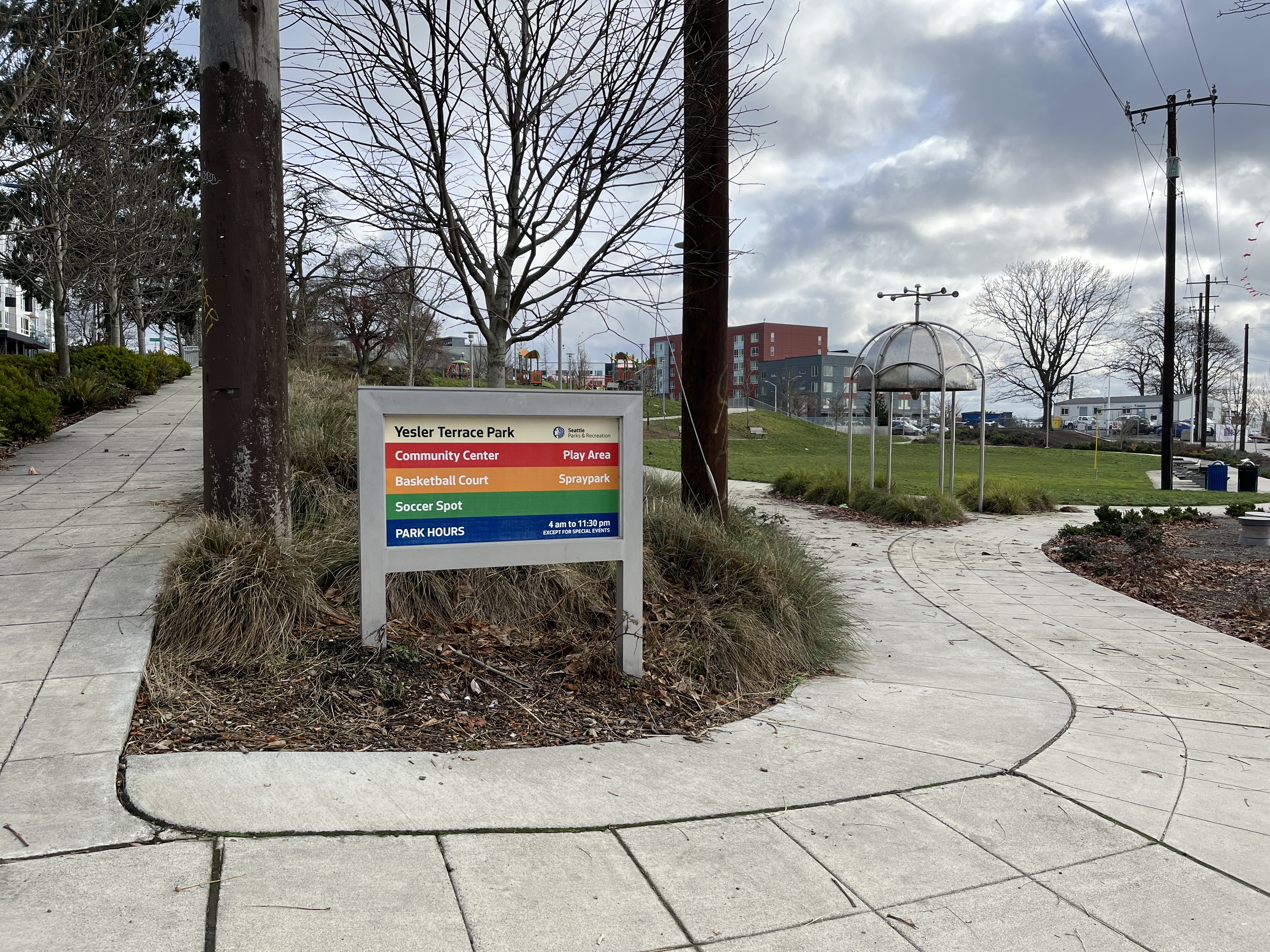
- The park and signage, 2022
- Interactive map of Yesler Terrace Park
- Location: Seattle, Washington, U.S.
- Coordinates: 47.6013°N 122.3208°W
- Area: 1.7 acres (0.69 ha)
- Established: 2018
- Operator: Seattle Parks and Recreation

Yesler Terrace Park is a 1.7-acre (0.69 ha) public park operated by Seattle Parks and Recreation, in Seattle's Yesler Terrace neighborhood, in the U.S. state of Washington. Located next to the Yesler Community Center, the park opened in 2018.

== Features ==
Yesler Terrace Park features a playground and climbing structures, a (not always functional) restroom, a spray park, a turf hill, and a small soccer field. The park is considered accessible and inclusive. According to Seattle's Child, the park "has stacked rubber rings that a wheelchair user or a kid with cerebral palsy can climb. Someone who needs more challenge can choose the complex net climbers. This park also has a saucer swing that fits bigger bodies and provides sensory play as well as a spinner designed at transfer-height where everyone's facing each other."

Ela Lamblin's stainless steel gazebo structure Whirl Piece: Current Events (2005) is installed in the park. The spray pad has red and gray stone sculptures by Christine Bourdette.

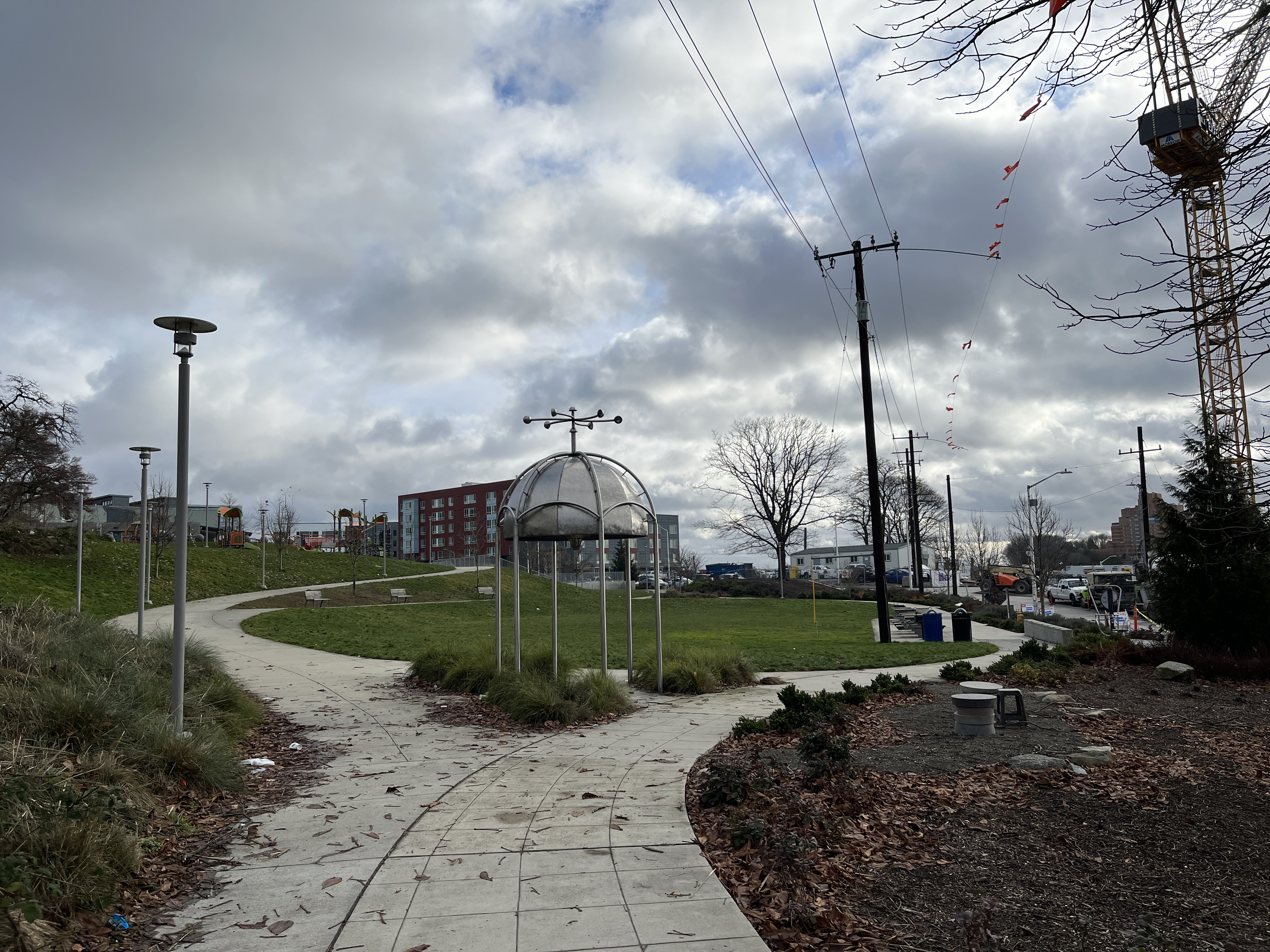
Steel gazebo

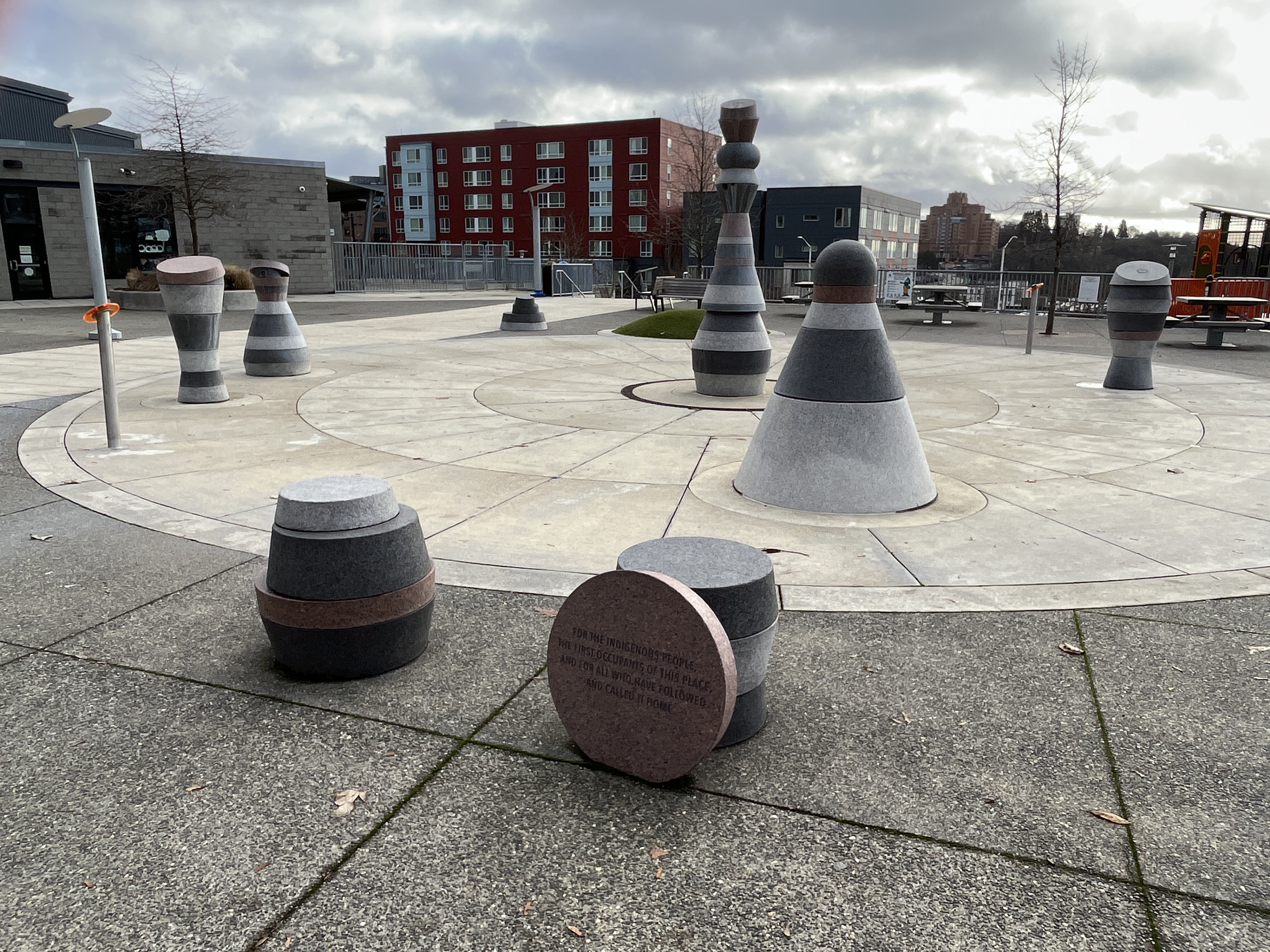
Spray pad

== See also ==
- List of parks in Seattle
