= Plymouth Pillars Park =

Public park in Seattle, Washington, U.S.

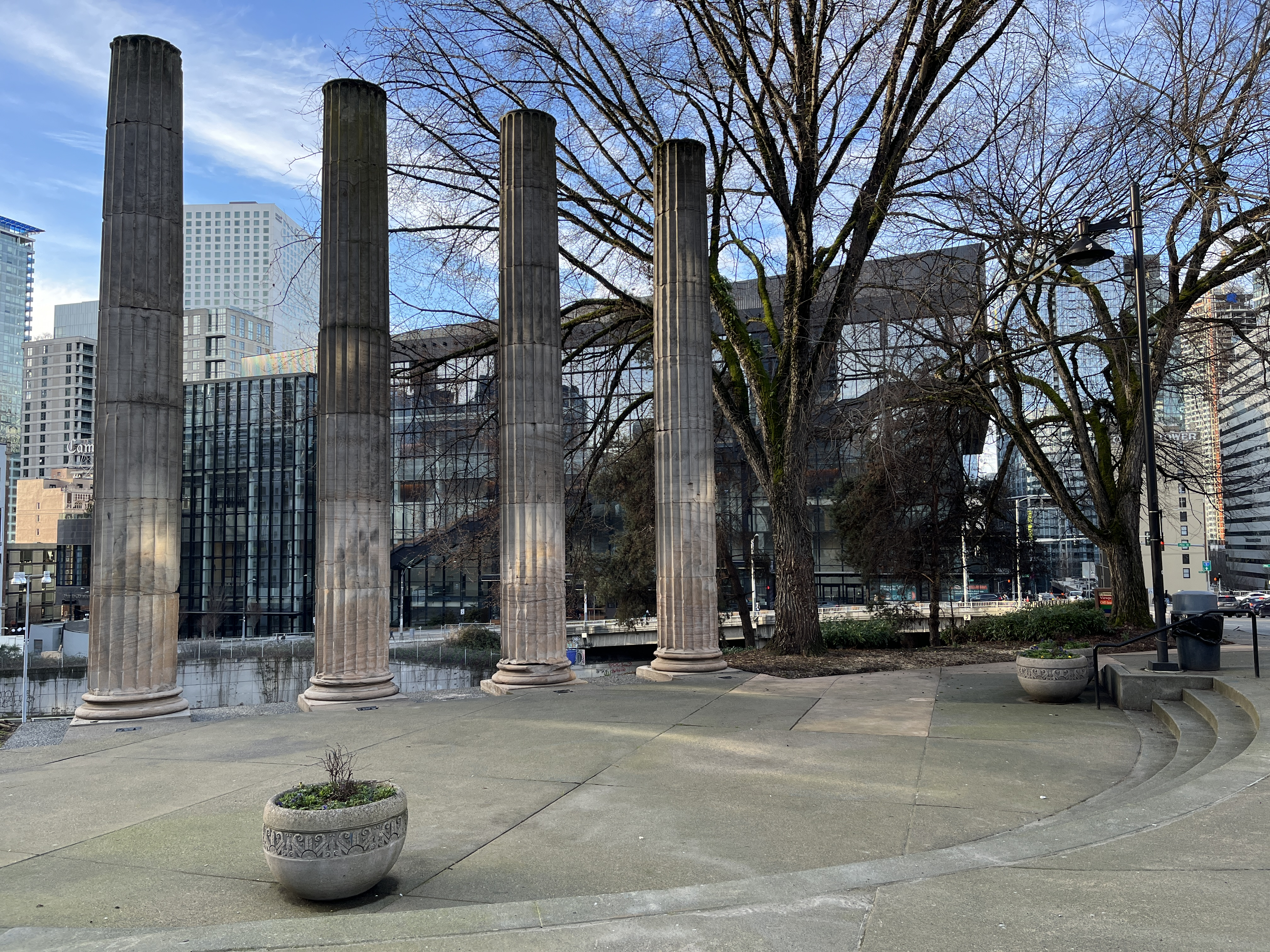
- The park in 2024

- Location within Washington (state)
- Location: Seattle, Washington, U.S.
- Coordinates: 47.6136°N 122.3294°W
- Area: .6 acres (0.24 ha)
- Operator: Seattle Parks and Recreation

Plymouth Pillars Park is a public park in Seattle, in the U.S. state of Washington.

== Description and history ==
The .6-acre (0.24 ha) park is located at the intersection of Boren Avenue and Pike Street, on the southwestern edge of Capitol Hill. The park has an off-leash area for dogs, benches, a pedestrian walkway, and public art. The four pillars were originally part of the Plymouth Congregational Church at the intersection of 6th Avenue and University Street, which was damaged by the 1965 Puget Sound earthquake and rebuilt without the pillars.

The church's columns were removed in March 1966 and sold to local businessman and art collector John Hauberg. They were gifted by Hauberg to the city, who announced plans to erect them on a triangular plot of state-owned land overlooking Interstate 5. The columns were installed in April 1967 and the land was transferred to the Seattle Parks Department. The monument was formally dedicated on October 24, 1967, and for decades framed views of Pike Place Market and the Space Needle until nearby development blocked them. Plymouth Pillars Park was rededicated in January 2006 and was previously known unofficially as Four Pillars Park.

In 2018, sketcher and Seattle Times news artist Gabriel Campanario said the park "may have one of the most bizarre viewpoints in Seattle".

== See also ==
- List of parks in Seattle
