= Miller Playfield =

Park in Seattle, Washington, U.S.

- Interactive map of Miller Playfield
- Location: Seattle, Washington, U.S.
- Coordinates: 47°37′17″N 122°18′23″W
- Operator: Seattle Parks and Recreation

Miller Playfield is a public park in Seattle, in the U.S. state of Washington.

Millery Playfield has a spraypark and pickleball courts. It is also used for youth sports. In the 2020s, the park attracted homeless encampments. Dozens of tentes were removed in April 2021.

== See also ==
- List of parks in Seattle
