= Seven Hills Park =

Park in Seattle, Washington, U.S.

- Interactive map of Seven Hills Park
- Location: Seattle, Washington, U.S.
- Coordinates: 47.6178°N 122.3118°W
- Operator: Seattle Parks and Recreation

Seven Hills Park is a public park at the intersection of 16th and Howell in Seattle, Washington, United States. Operated by Seattle Parks and Recreation, the site was acquired in 2007.

The park has seven boulders, representing the seven hills of Seattle. In September 2025, the park was fenced in. It is slated to remain closed until the end of the year.

== See also ==
- List of parks in Seattle
