= Blanche Lavizzo Park =

Park in Seattle, Washington, U.S.

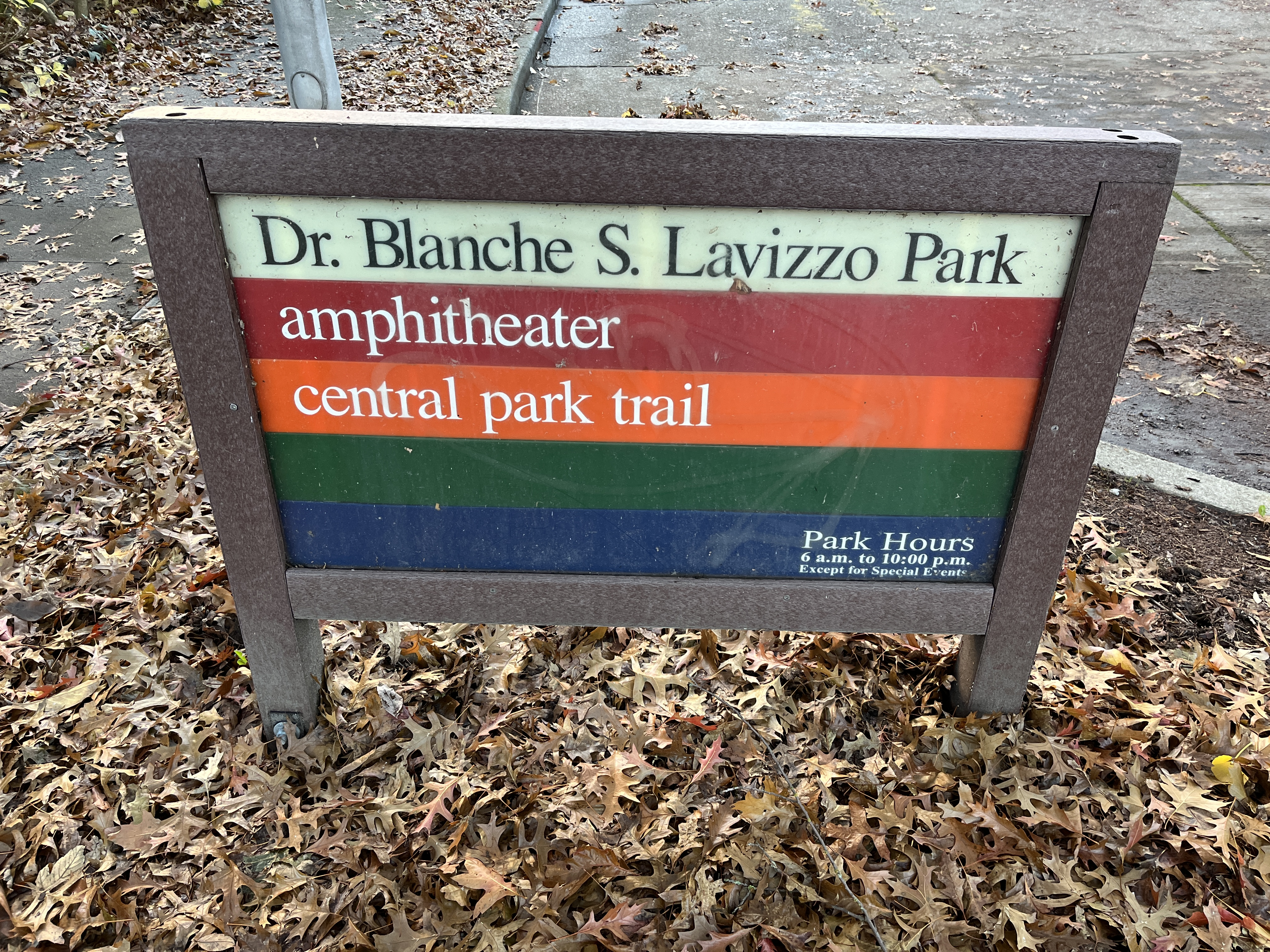
- Sign for the park, 2022
- Interactive map of Blanche Lavizzo Park
- Location: Seattle, Washington, United States
- Coordinates: 47.6003°N 122.3043°W

Dr. Blanche Lavizzo Park is a public park in Seattle, Washington, United States. Previously known as Yesler Atlantic Pedestrian Pathway, the park was later named after the first African-American female pediatrician in Washington. The narrow park connects South Jackson Street and East Yesler Way. It is being considered for a dog park.

== Contents ==
Dr. Blanche Lavizzo Park has many trees, including poplar and oak. The park has picnic tables, a picnic shelter, and a small amphitheater.

== History ==
The Yesler Atlantic Pedestrian Pathway was renamed the Dr. Blanche Lavizzo Park in 1991. It was a 1,953 acre park. In 1995 the Edwin T. Pratt Park's water play area was also named after Lavizzo.

=== Dr. Blanche Lavizzo ===
Lavizzo was Washington State's first African American woman pediatrician, having moved from New Orleans to Seattle in 1956. In 1970 she became the first medical director of Odessa Brown Children's Clinic, serving children in the Central Area. She also obtained a Masters in Public Health from the University of Washington in 1975. She was the president of the Seattle Chapter of Links, Inc., on the board of the Girls Club of Puget Sound, and volunteered for the Seattle Urban League, United Way of King County, and health organizations. Lavizzo died in 1984.

=== Recent history ===
The park hosted a production of William Shakespeare's play Much Ado About Nothing in 2010.

The park's play area was redone in 2023. It was closed temporarily in late 2025. After Seattle Parks and Recreation met with community members to discuss park activation and safety changes, they announced short-term next steps and potential plans for park changes in February 2026. Immediate changes included park cleanup and lighting additions, removing fencing around the picnic shelter, and running a survey on Crime Prevention Through Environmental Design, followed by repairing trail surfaces and expanding the concrete pad to support temporary skate features.

From the February 2026 outreach sessions, Seattle Parks and Recreation concluded that preferred future park uses included spaces for community gardening, an off-leash dog area, playground features, pickleball courts, skate or bike features, outdoor furniture, basketball courts, youth soccer fields, and adult exercise equipment. They also surveyed the community's preferred park events programming, finding that outdoor markets, concerts, movies, food trucks, and fitness classes were popular suggestions.

== See also ==
- List of parks in Seattle
