= Lake People Park =

Park in Washington, United States

- Lake People Park, looking east
- Interactive map of Lake People Park
- Location: 3070 S. Bradford Street; Seattle, Washington, U.S.
- Coordinates: 47.5689°N 122.292°W
- Operator: Seattle Parks and Recreation

Lake People Park is a 1/2-acre (0.20 ha) park at 3070 S. Bradford Street in the Columbia City neighborhood of Seattle, Washington, just south of the intersection of Martin Luther King Jr. Way S. and Rainier Avenue S. In 2003, the land was donated to the Seattle Parks Foundation by Monte Powell, a developer who was responsible for much of the newer construction in the neighborhood. He decided to make the donation after attending a presentation on community-established parks.

The property is made up of a flat upper area that drops off into a steep hill slope. Upon its donation, the lot was overgrown with blackberries, ivy, and other invasive plants. Neighbors of the park formed the Friends of Goat Hill and worked in partnership with Seattle Parks Foundation to clear the land and raise sufficient funds for landscaping, footpaths, park benches, boulders for informal seating, picnic tables, and interpretive signage. The completed park was dedicated in spring 2005, and for the three years following, maintenance was overseen by Seattle Parks Foundation. The park was then turned over to Seattle Parks and Recreation for ongoing stewardship.

"Lake People" is a calque of the Lushootseed word x̌ačuʔabš, the name of the Indigenous peoples of Lake Washington and Lake Union, today considered a subgroup of the Duwamish. Although they were not historically a unified group, they were united in their lake-oriented lifestyle, and hence, are known as the "Lake People."
