= East Queen Anne Playground =

Public park in Seattle, Washington, U.S.

- Interactive map of East Queen Anne Playground
- Location: Seattle, Washington, U.S.
- Coordinates: 47°38′10″N 122°21′14″W

East Queen Anne Playground, also known as "Little Howe" or Little Howe Park, is a public park in Seattle, in the U.S. state of Washington. It was established in 1910 after the city acquired land from John and Ida Watrons.

The small park has benches, a playground, a restroom, and a wading pool. It is being considered for a dog park.

During a teachers strike in 2022, the park was among locations where students could get meals.

== See also ==
- List of parks in Seattle
