= Martin Luther King Jr. Civil Rights Memorial Park =

Park in Seattle, Washington, U.S.

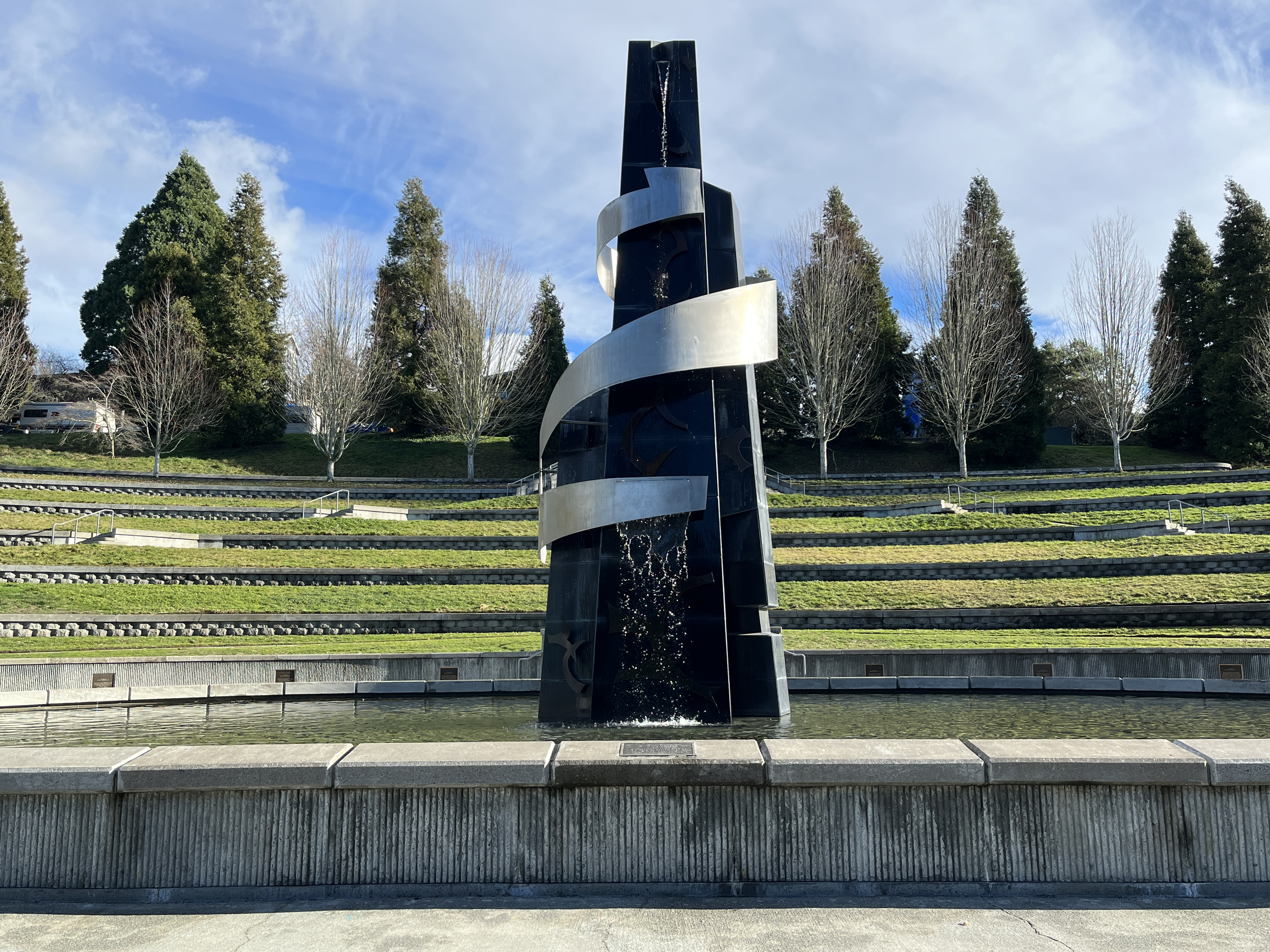
- The park in 2023
- Interactive map of Martin Luther King Jr. Civil Rights Memorial Park
- Location: Seattle, Washington, U.S.
- Coordinates: 47.583°N 122.298°W
- Operator: Seattle Parks and Recreation

Martin Luther King Jr. Civil Rights Memorial Park (also known as Dr. Martin Luther King Jr. Memorial Park and Martin Luther King, Jr. Memorial Park) is a 4.5-acre public park in Seattle, in the U.S. state of Washington. The park features Robert Kelly's 30-foot-tall sculpture inspired by King's "I've Been to the Mountaintop" speech, which was gifted to the city by the Martin Luther King Jr. Memorial Committee in 1991. Surrounding the artwork are hills offering views of Rainier Valley. "Civil Rights" was added to the park's name in 2018.

== See also ==
- List of memorials to Martin Luther King Jr.
- List of parks in Seattle
