= Broadway Hill Park =

Park in Seattle, Washington, U.S.

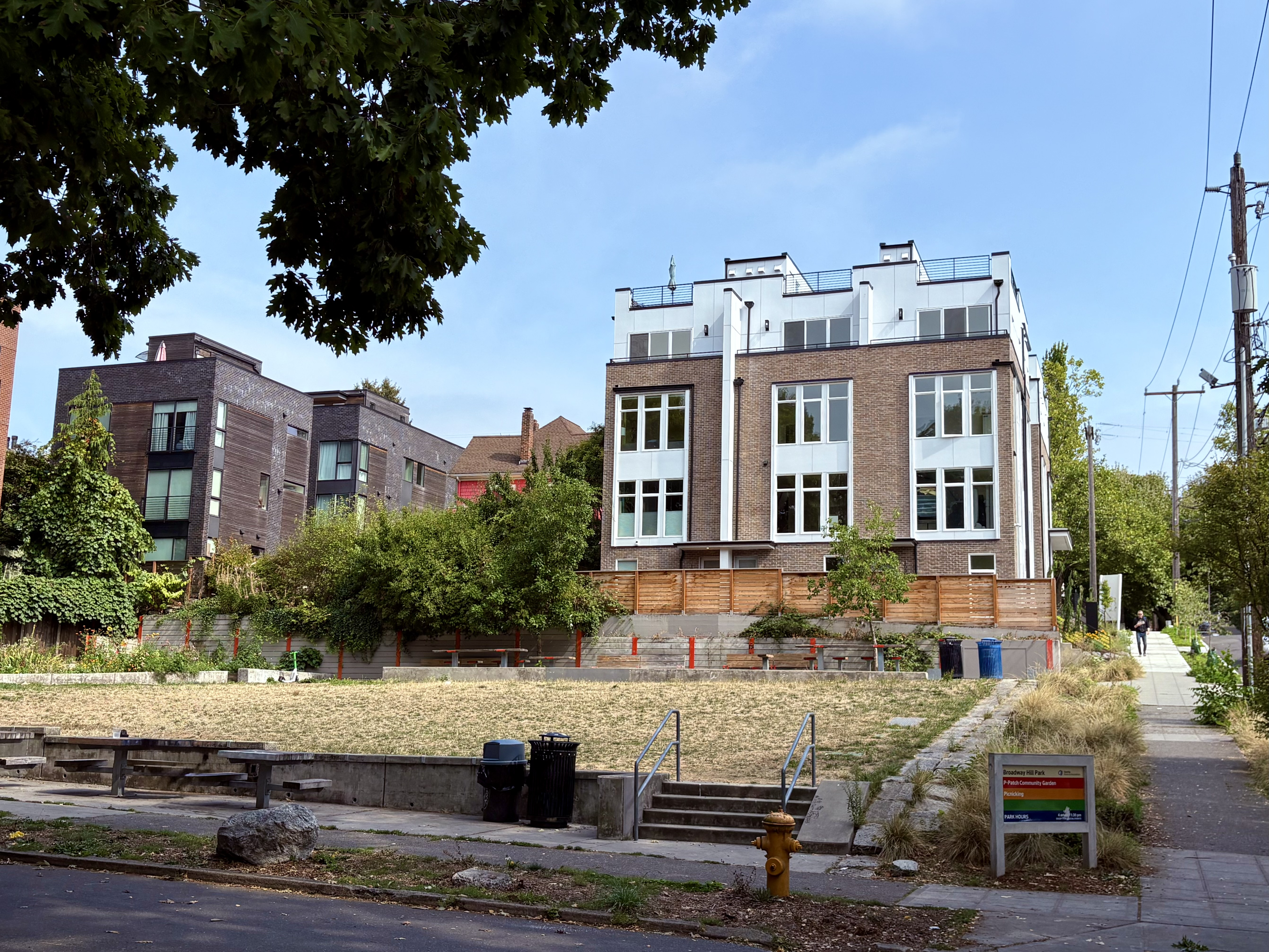
- The park in 2025
- Interactive map of Broadway Hill Park
- Type: Urban park
- Location: Seattle, Washington, U.S.
- Coordinates: 47.6233°N 122.3186°W
- Created: July 14, 2016
- Operator: Seattle Parks and Recreation
- Open: All year

Broadway Hill Park is a public park on Seattle's Capitol Hill, in the U.S. state of Washington. Located at the intersection of Federal Ave and Republican St, it is operated by Seattle Parks and Recreation.

The park was built on 12,000 square feet of land acquired by the city for $1.975 million in 2010, after the previous owners, Fedrep Investors, failed to develop a townhome project. Construction was originally planned to complete later in the same year, but the park opened in July 2016.

In 2021, Broadway Hill Park experienced public safety issues related to homeless encampments. Seattle Fire Department responded to ten fires at the park over six months, including tent fires and illegal burns that caused damage to the park. In May 2021, the city intensified outreach efforts to relocate residents to shelter and permanent housing. The mayor's office said that 30 people were referred to shelter before camps were cleaned up.
