= Summit Slope Park =

Park in Seattle, Washington, U.S.

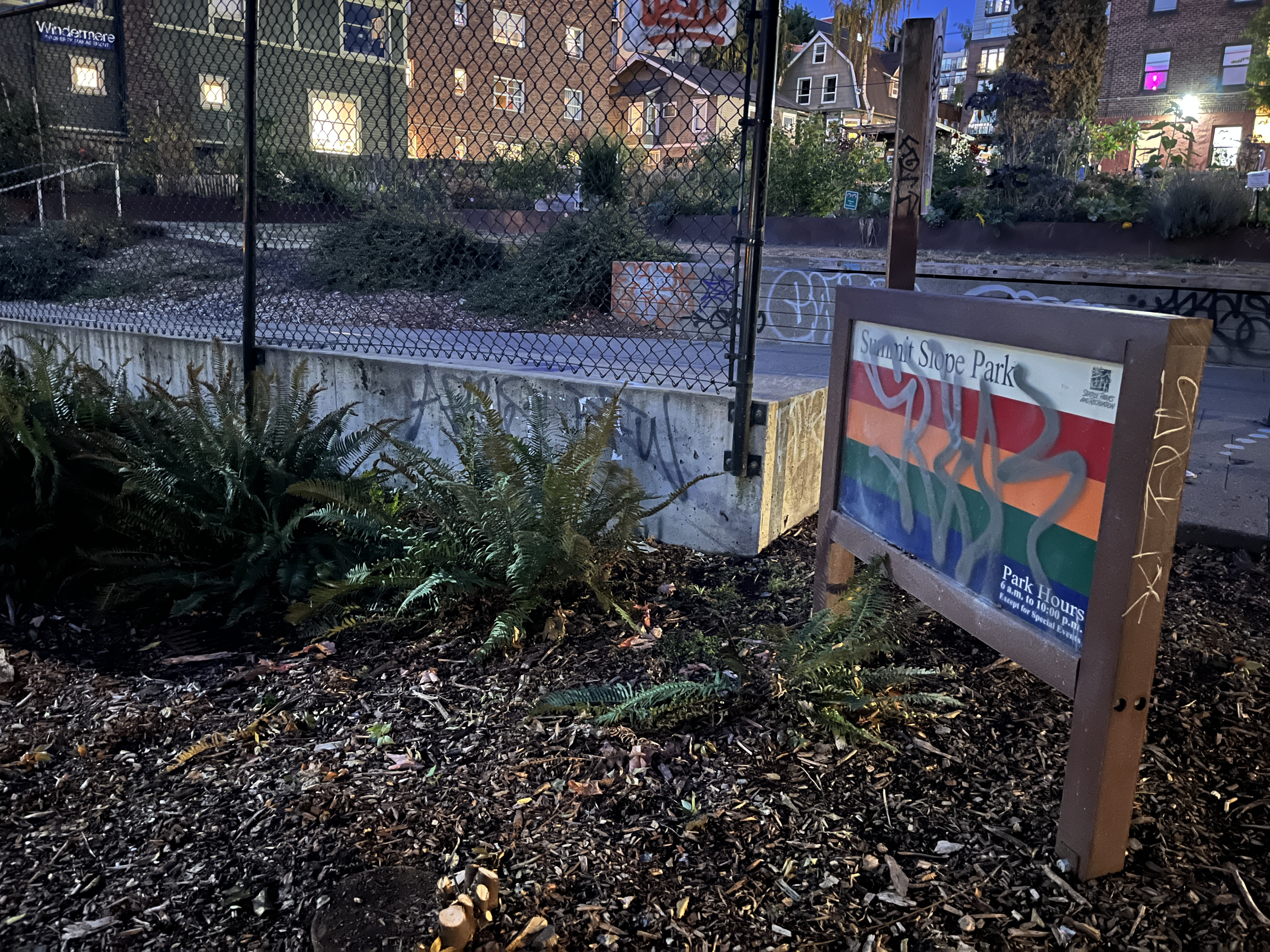
- Park sign, 2023
- Interactive map of Summit Slope Park
- Nearest city: Seattle, Washington, U.S.
- Coordinates: 47°37′11.5″N 122°19′30″W

Summit Slope Park (formerly the John and Summit Park) is a public park in Seattle, in the U.S. state of Washington.

== Description ==
Located at East John Street and Summit Avenue East in Capitol Hill, the park was designed by Mithun for Seattle Parks and Recreation. According to the Seattle Post-Intelligencer, the park "integrates un-manicured gardens, formal lawns, gathering places and seating into a small area".

== Reception ==
The Seattle Design Commission, which recognized Summit Slope Park at the 2010-2011 design awards, has said, "The park is a clear example of how simple design and detailing can become a backdrop to the neighborhood, enhance our experience of the city and create a well used and loved space for the community."
