= Bhy Kracke Park =

Public park in Seattle, Washington, U.S.

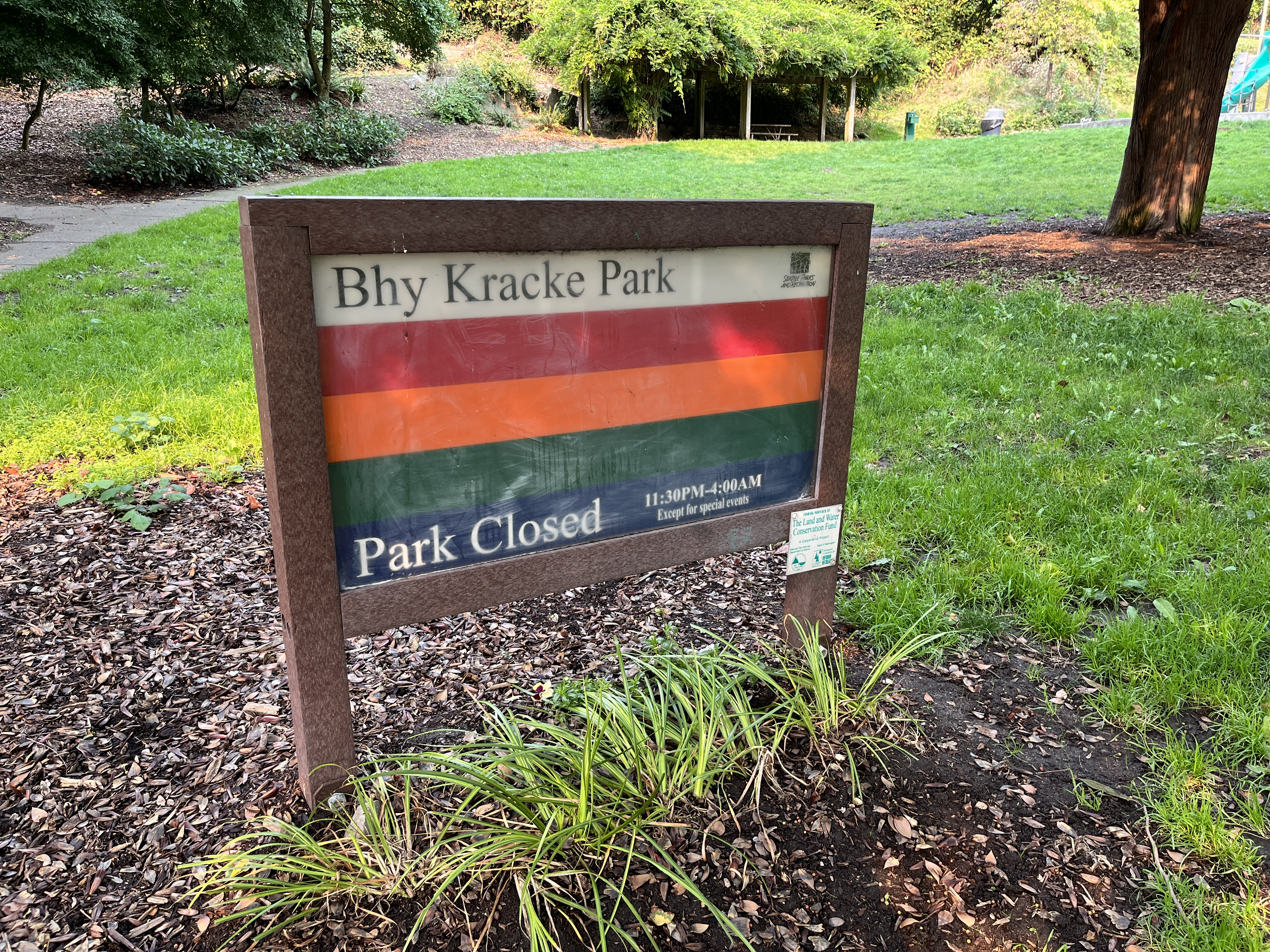
- Park sign, 2024
- Interactive map of Bhy Kracke Park
- Location: Seattle, Washington, United States
- Coordinates: 47°37′50″N 122°20′55″W

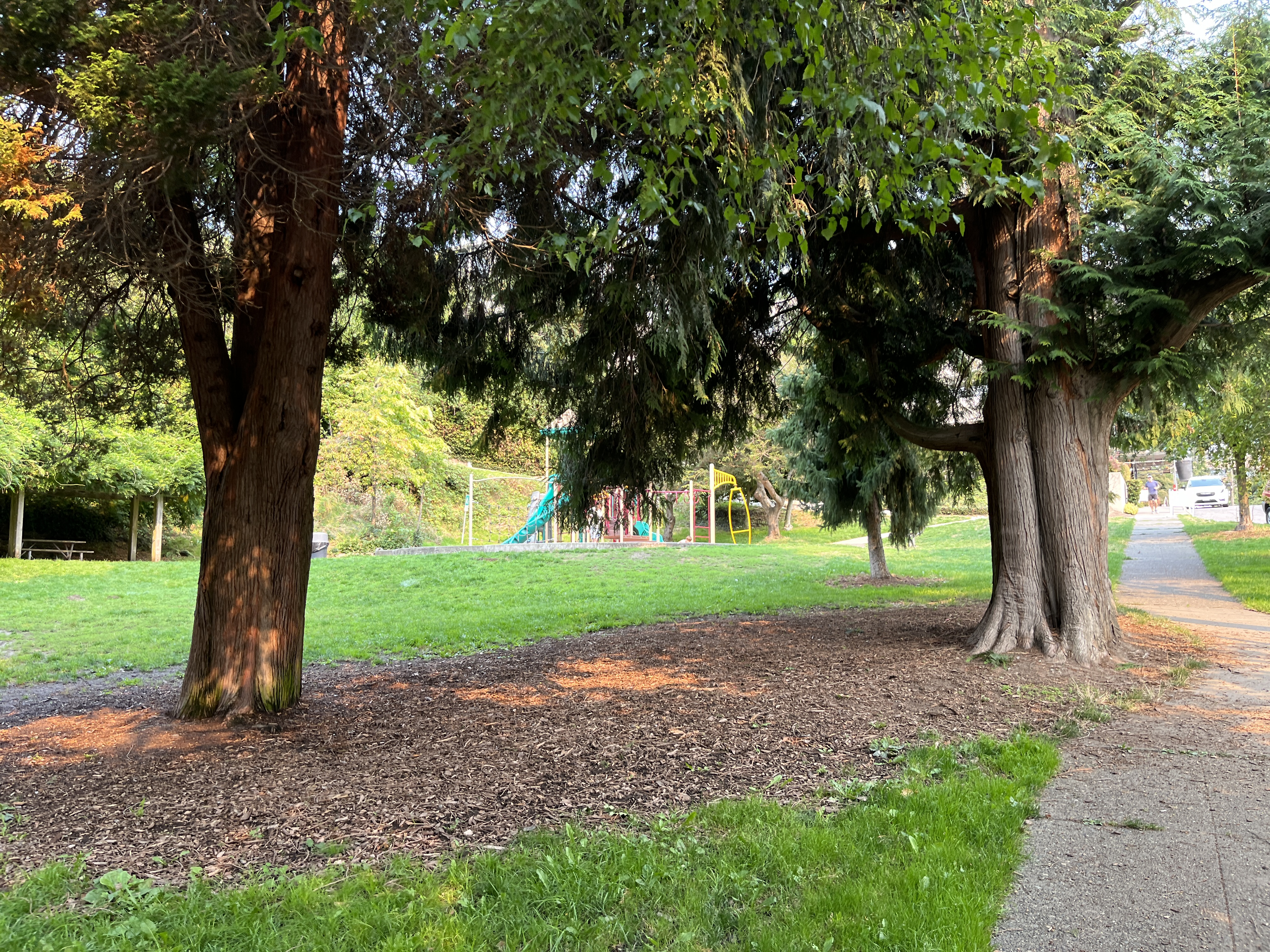
The park in 2024

Bhy Kracke Park (also known as Comstock Place Park) is a public park in Seattle's Queen Anne neighborhood, in the U.S. state of Washington. It is on the southeast side of Queen Anne Hill, between Bigelow Avenue (part of Queen Anne Boulevard) and 5th Avenue North. The park offers views of the Cascade Range, downtown Seattle, Lake Union, and the Space Needle.

The park was named for Werner H. "Bhy" Kracke, who deeded the property to the city shortly after his death in 1971, along with $20,000 to develop it. It was designed by landscape architect Roy Lehner to center around a winding trail between two levels—the viewpoint at the top and other amenities at the bottom. Bhy Kracke Park has azaleas, magnolias, and rhododendrons. It has been described as "one of the best hidden parks" in the city. Bhy Kracke has been considered for an off-leash dog park.

== See also ==
- List of parks in Seattle
