= Counterbalance Park =

Park in Seattle, Washington, U.S.

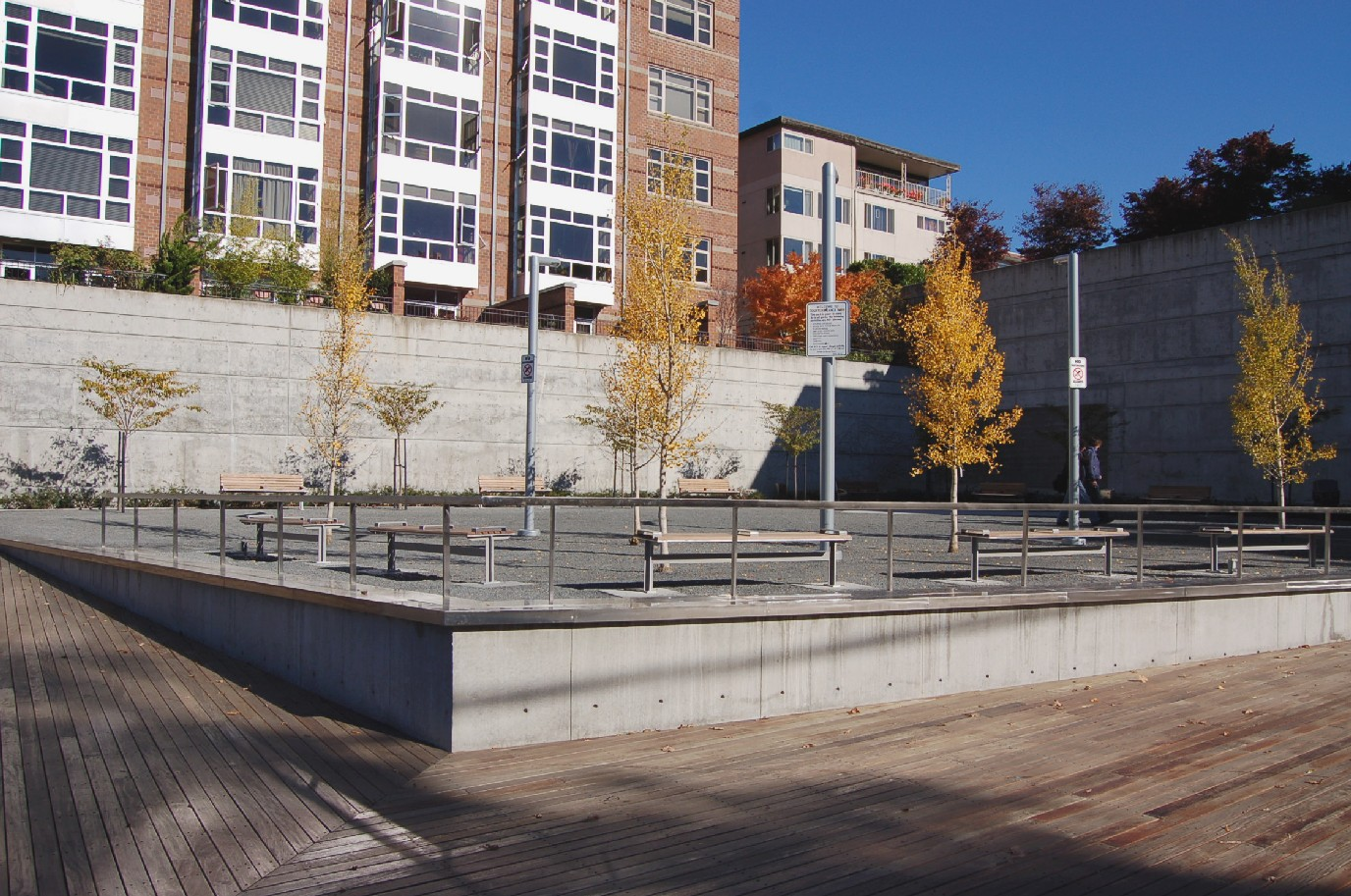
- The park in 2014
- Interactive map of Counterbalance Park
- Location: Seattle, Washington, U.S.
- Coordinates: 47.6256919°N 122.35635°W

Counterbalance Park is a small 12,000 ft^{2} (1,100 m^{2}) municipal park in Seattle, in the U.S. state of Washington. Located at 700 Queen Anne Ave N. (northeast corner of the intersection with Roy St), it is named for the Counterbalance line which ran nearby.

== Description and history ==
The park was designed by landscape architect Robert Murase and artist Iole Alessandrini. The Pro Parks Levy, approved by voters in November 2000, made funds available to acquire a park site tentatively named Queen Anne Park; the identified site was formerly occupied by a gasoline station, and was purchased by the City of Seattle in 2004. The design was largely complete by October 2005, when it was presented to the Seattle Design Commission, and detail modifications were made for a follow-up review in March 2007; by then the park had received its current name. The park was completed in 2008 and a ribbon-cutting ceremony was held on July 19.

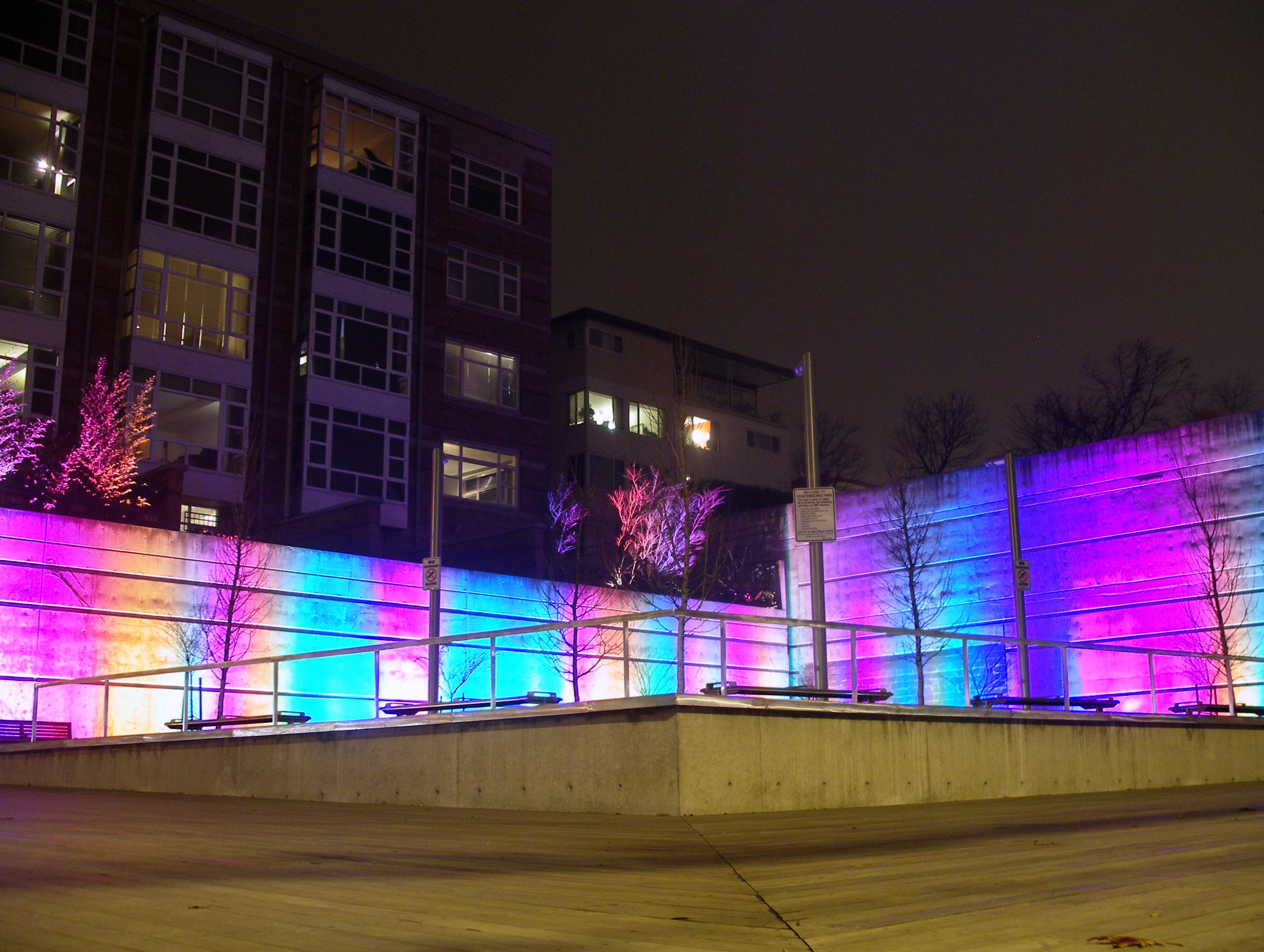
The park at night, 2009

The original design was a plaza with shade trees lining the concrete retaining walls on the north and east edges of the plaza; there is a narrow outer area paralleling each street covered with ipe wood decking, and a larger inner area covered with decomposed granite. The inner area was set off from the outer ipe decking with a lit, elevated corner, which would be echoed by uplighting on the north and east retaining walls. Originally, Counterbalance Park was designed by Murase with a water feature flowing over boulders in the northeast corner of the inner area; however, due to budget constraints, this was never implemented. The park was completed under a public-private partnership, with private donors contributing approximately half the cost of construction. To honor the private donor that made the largest single contribution, an "art element" was added consisting of five sculpted rocks. The implemented "art element" was criticized because the final designs were never reviewed or approved by Seattle Parks staff prior to installation, and the execution was seen as inelegant.

The park was panned initially as unimpressive and uninviting. After the lighting system designed by Alessandrini and Murase was debugged, programmable LED fixtures illuminate the park's vertical concrete retaining walls and corner element from 5 PM to 2 AM nightly and the site was praised as "Seattle's best after-hours park", provided that foot traffic would increase.

== See also ==
- List of parks in Seattle
