= The Beach at Expedia Group =

Park in Seattle, Washington, U.S.

Coordinates: 47°37′37″N 122°22′40″W

- Beach
- Interactive map of The Beach at Expedia Group
- Location: Seattle, Washington, U.S.
- Website: www.expediagroup.com/home/default.aspx

The Beach at Expedia Group, or simply The Beach, is a 2.6-acre beach on the Expedia Group campus in Seattle, Washington, United States.

== See also ==
- List of parks in Seattle
