= Judkins Park and Playfield =

Public park in Seattle, Washington, U.S.

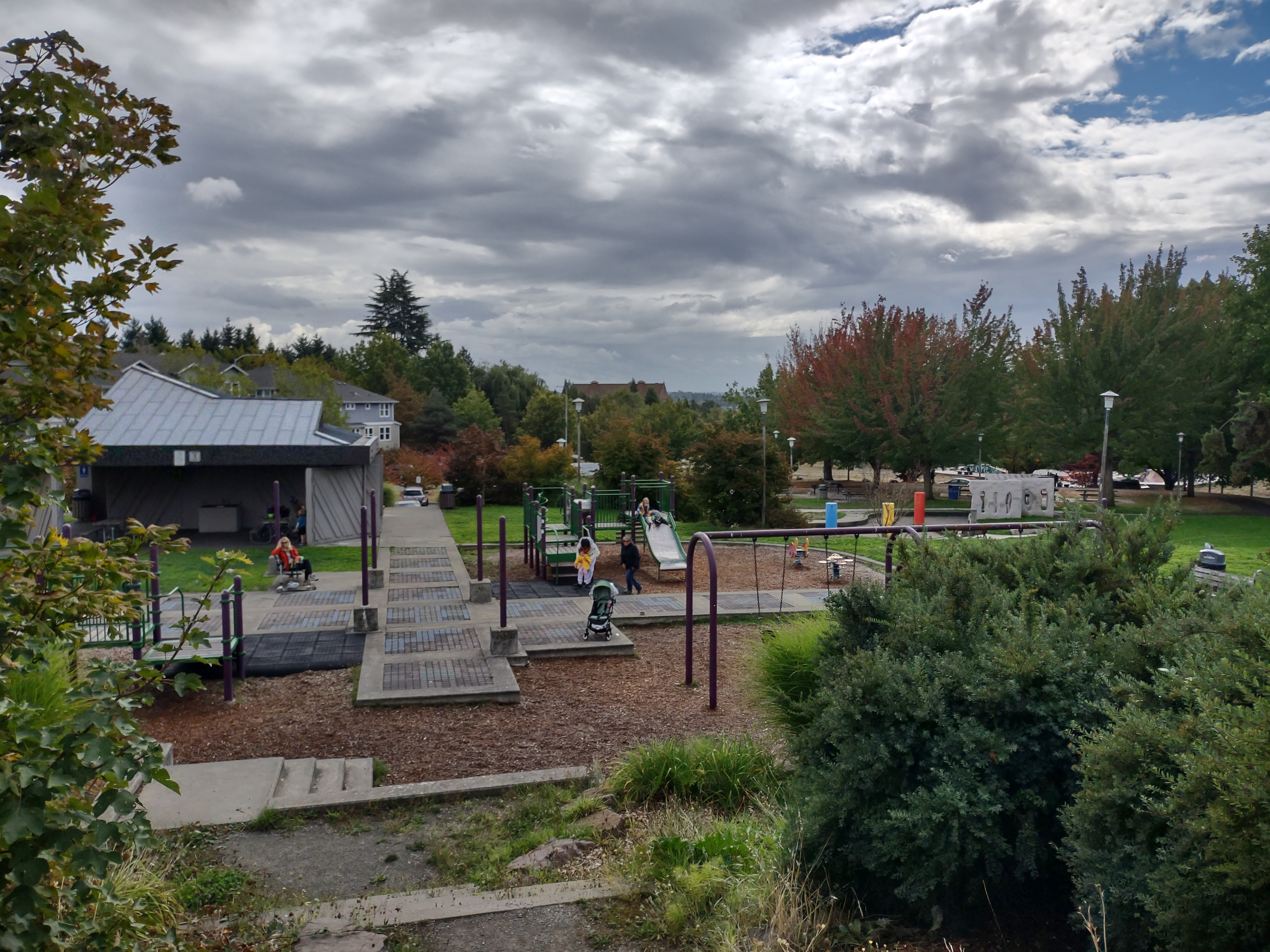
- Playground at the park, 2021
- Interactive map of Judkins Park and Playfield
- Location: Seattle, Washington, U.S.
- Coordinates: 47°35′39″N 122°18′14″W

Judkins Park and Playfield is a public park in Seattle's Central District, in the U.S. state of Washington. The park has a concrete roller rink.

The park has been the site of protests and other events, including the Umoja Fest Africatown Heritage Festival & Parade. Thousands gathered for a Black Lives Matter demonstration in 2020. In 2022, demonstrators gathered on May Day in support of immigrant rights. Additionally, the Northwest African American Museum hosted Skate to Freedom Party & Community Day" in conjunction with Juneteenth, and approximately 100 educators gathered on Labor Day in preparation to strike.

== See also ==
- List of parks in Seattle
