= Pratt Park =

Park in Seattle, Washington, U.S.

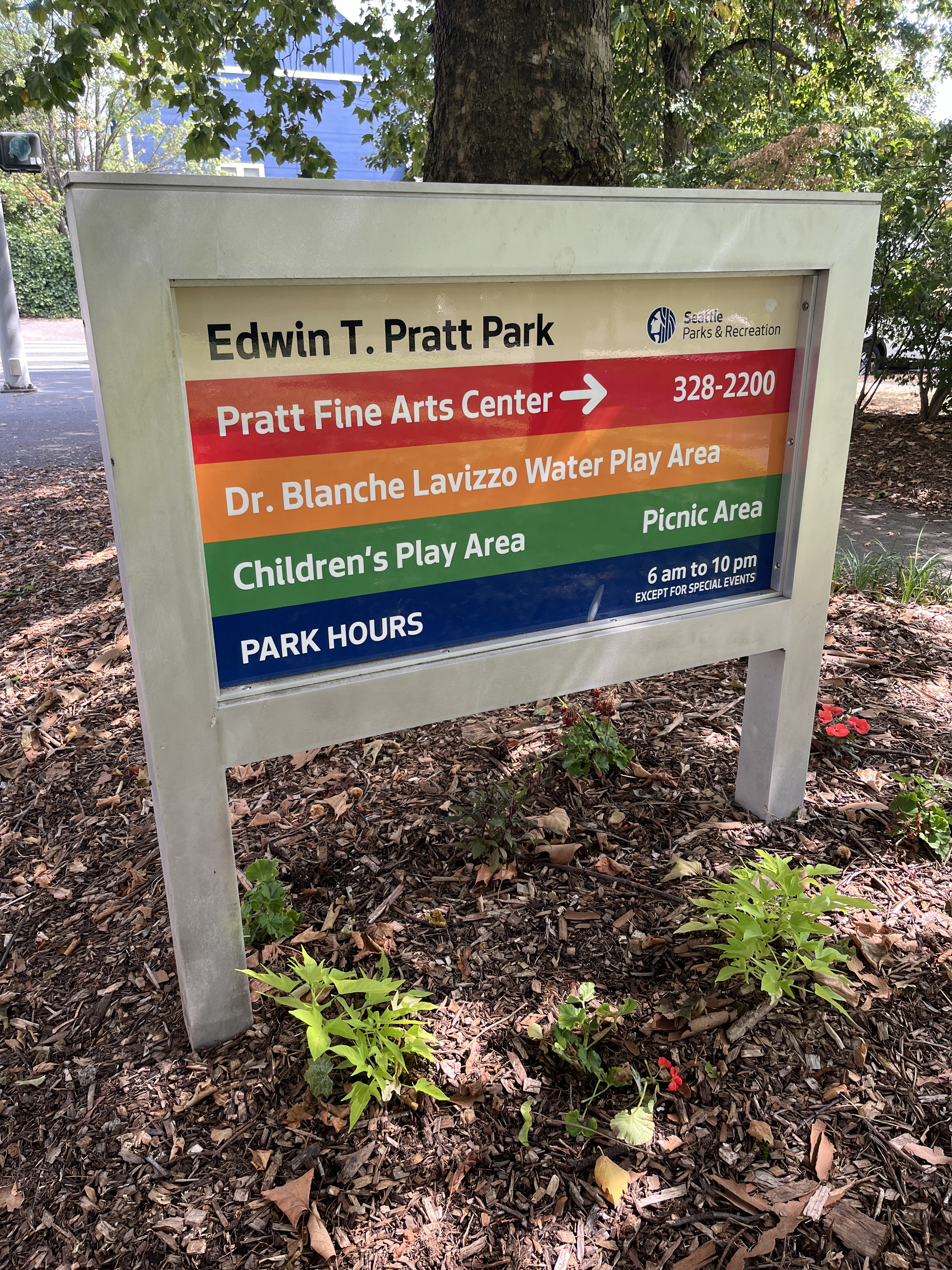
- Sign for the park, 2024
- Interactive map of Pratt Park
- Location: Seattle, Washington, U.S.
- Coordinates: 47°36′03″N 122°18′27″W
- Operator: Seattle Parks and Recreation

Pratt Park is a public park operated by Seattle Parks and Recreation, in the U.S. state of Washington. Named after Edwin T. Pratt, the founder of the Central Area Motivation Program and the Seattle Opportunities Industrialization Center, it has basketball courts, a playground, and a spray park. The park has also hosted art installations and musical performances.

== See also ==
- List of parks in Seattle
- Pratt Fine Arts Center
