= Alvin Larkins Park =

Park in Seattle, Washington, United States

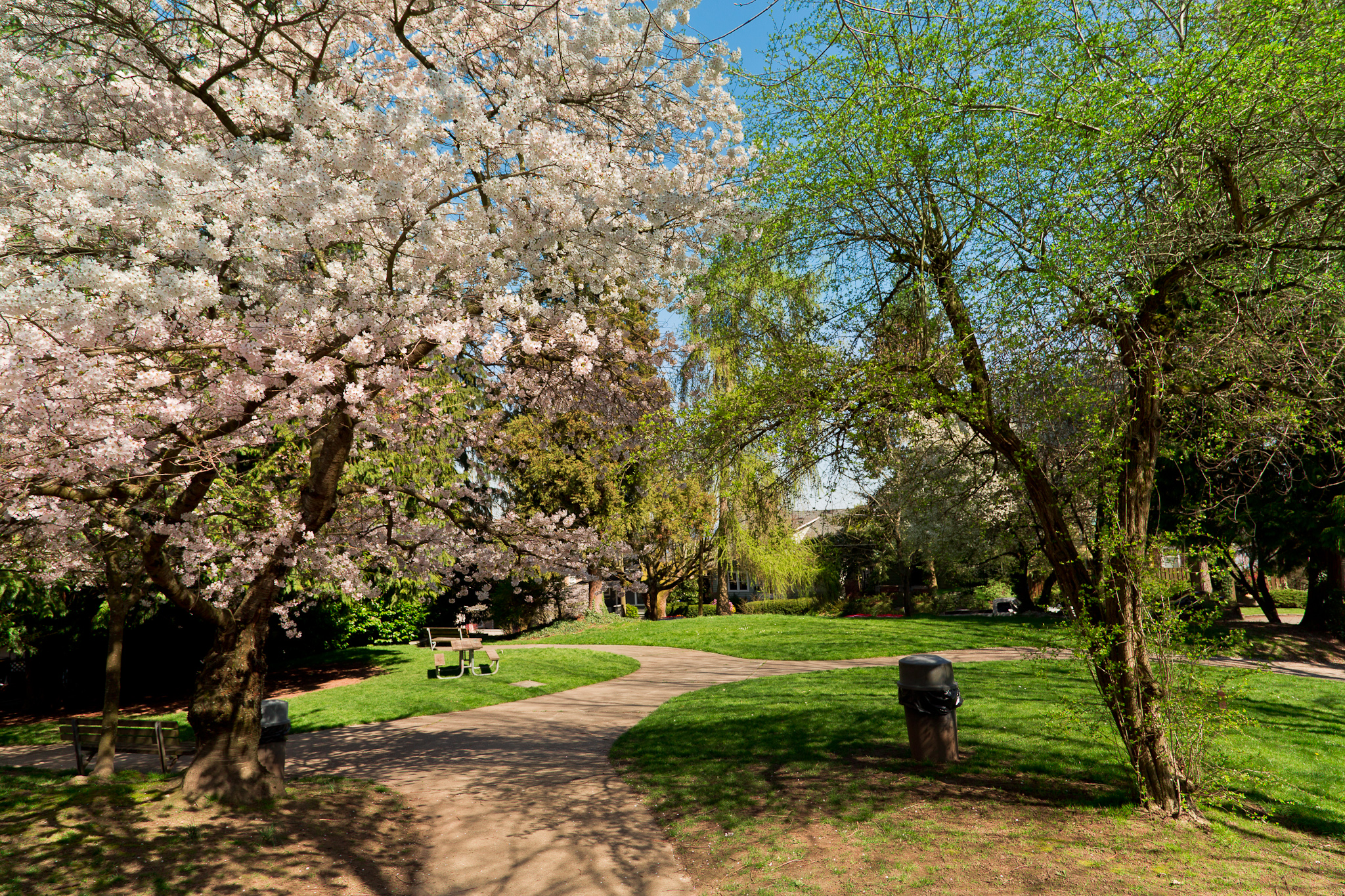
- Alvin Larkins Park in 2013
- Interactive map of Alvin Larkins Park
- Type: Urban Park
- Location: Seattle, Washington
- Coordinates: 47°36′51″N 122°17′19″W
- Created: 1975; 51 years ago
- Operator: Seattle Parks and Recreation

Alvin Larkins Park is a park in the Madrona neighborhood of Seattle, Washington, located on the north side of E. Pike Street between 34th and 35th Avenues.

The land was purchased by the city in 1973 and made into a park in 1975. In 1979, it was named after Alvin Larkins, a resident of the neighborhood from 1949 until he died in 1977.
