= Montlake Playfield =

Park in Seattle, Washington, U.S.

Coordinates: 47°38′31.8″N 122°18′36″W

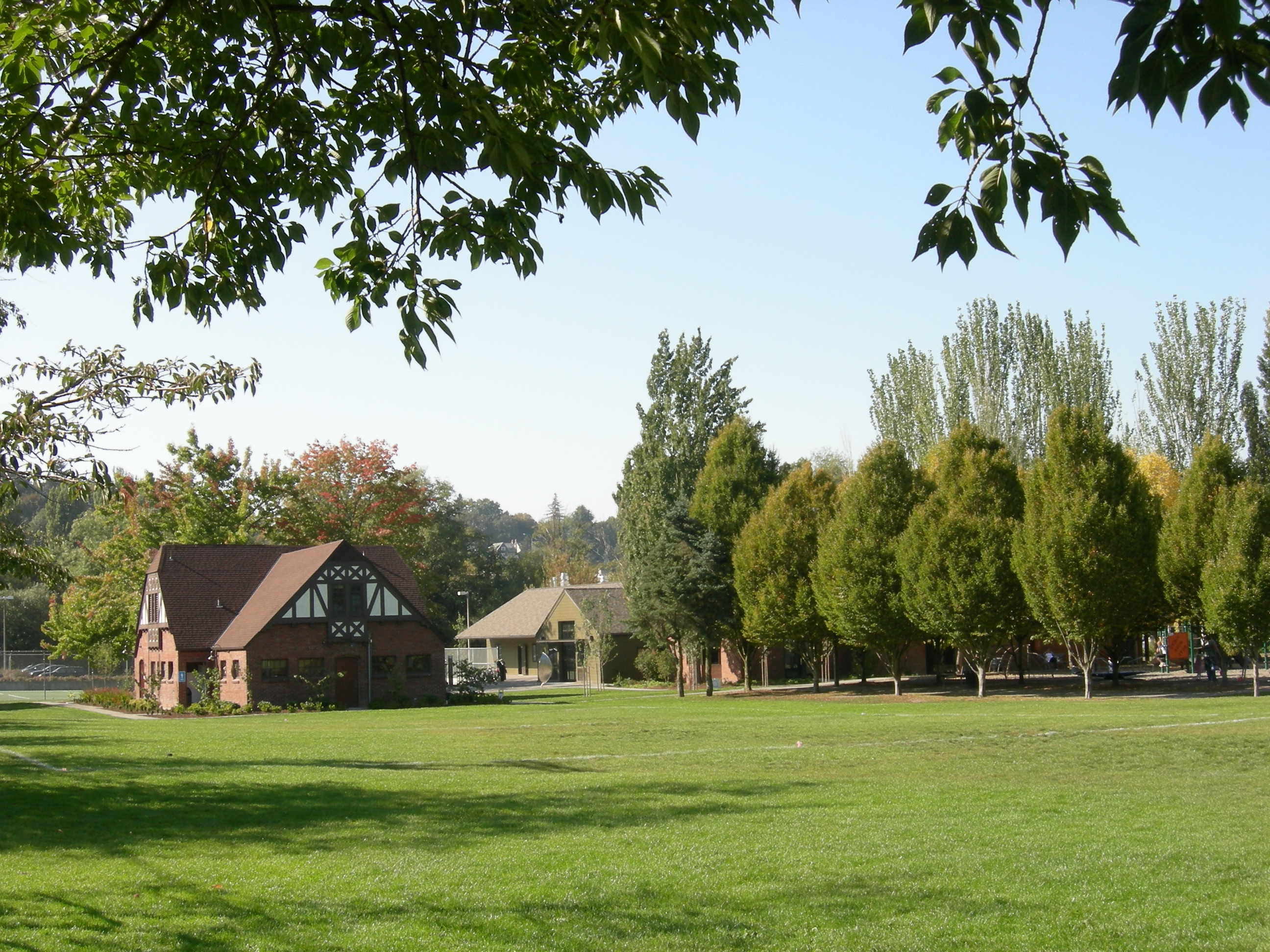
- Part of Montlake Playfield and Montlake Community Center.
- Interactive map of Montlake Playfield
- Type: Playfield
- Location: Seattle, Washington, United States

Montlake Playfield is a 27-acre (100,000 m²) park and playfield on Portage Bay in the Montlake neighborhood of Seattle, Washington, USA.

Originally a 20-foot-deep peat bog, the playfield site was first developed as part of a dahlia farm. The farm extended considerably further south than the present playfield: its southernmost part was south of Lynn Street, the land used to build St. Demetrios Greek Orthodox Church. In the late 1920s, the principal of Garfield High School declared the need of a playfield and community center, and the farm was chosen. After some controversy and condemnation proceedings, the playfield was dedicated in 1935.

In 1960, to remedy flooding, the playfield began to be raised with fill, including dirt from the excavation of State Route 520 through Montlake. The ground remains uneven and boggy to this day.
