= Tashkent Park =

Park in Seattle, Washington, U.S.

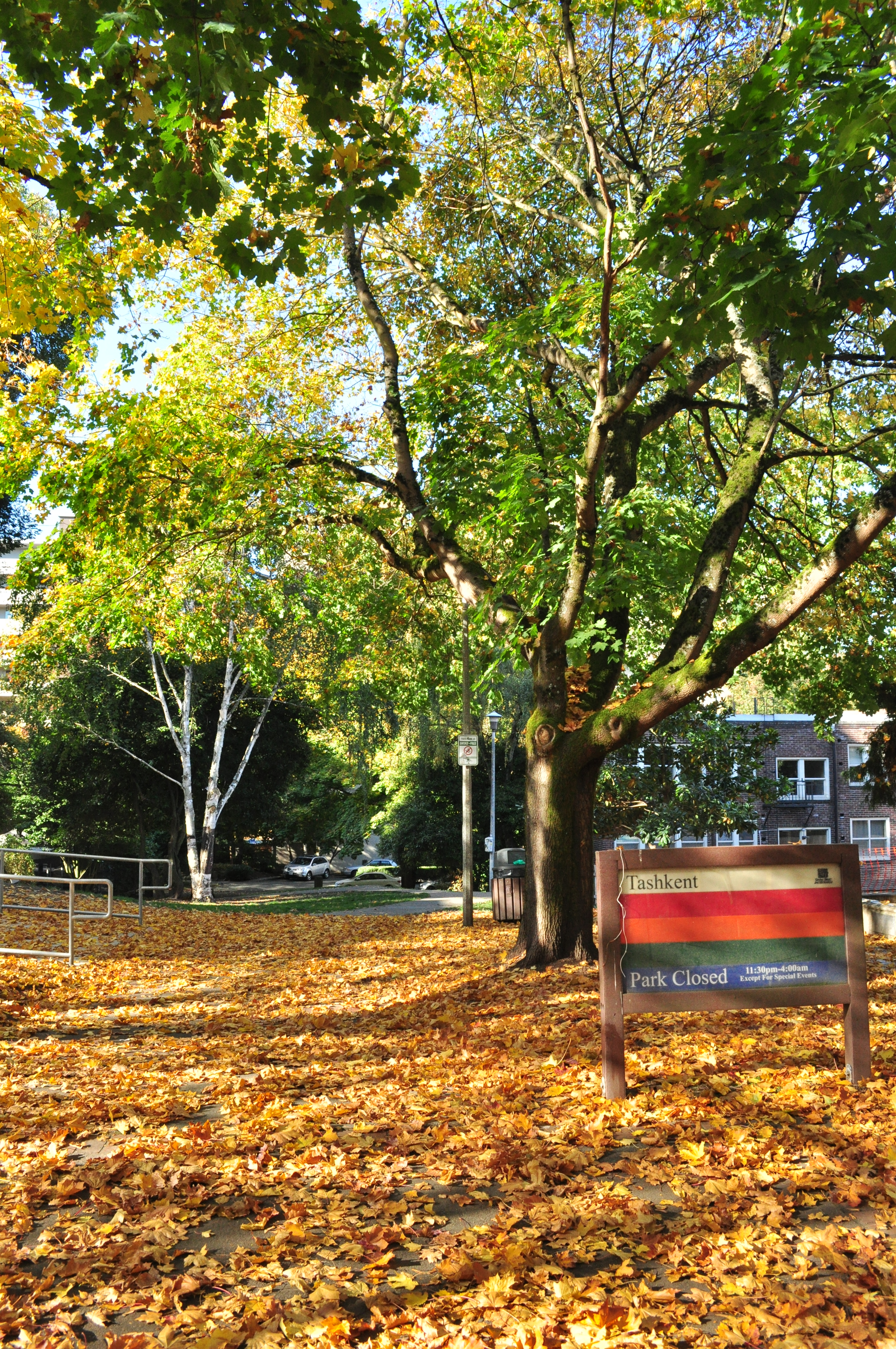
- The park in 2017
- Interactive map of Tashkent Park
- Nearest city: Seattle, Washington, U.S.
- Coordinates: 47°37′26″N 122°19′24″W

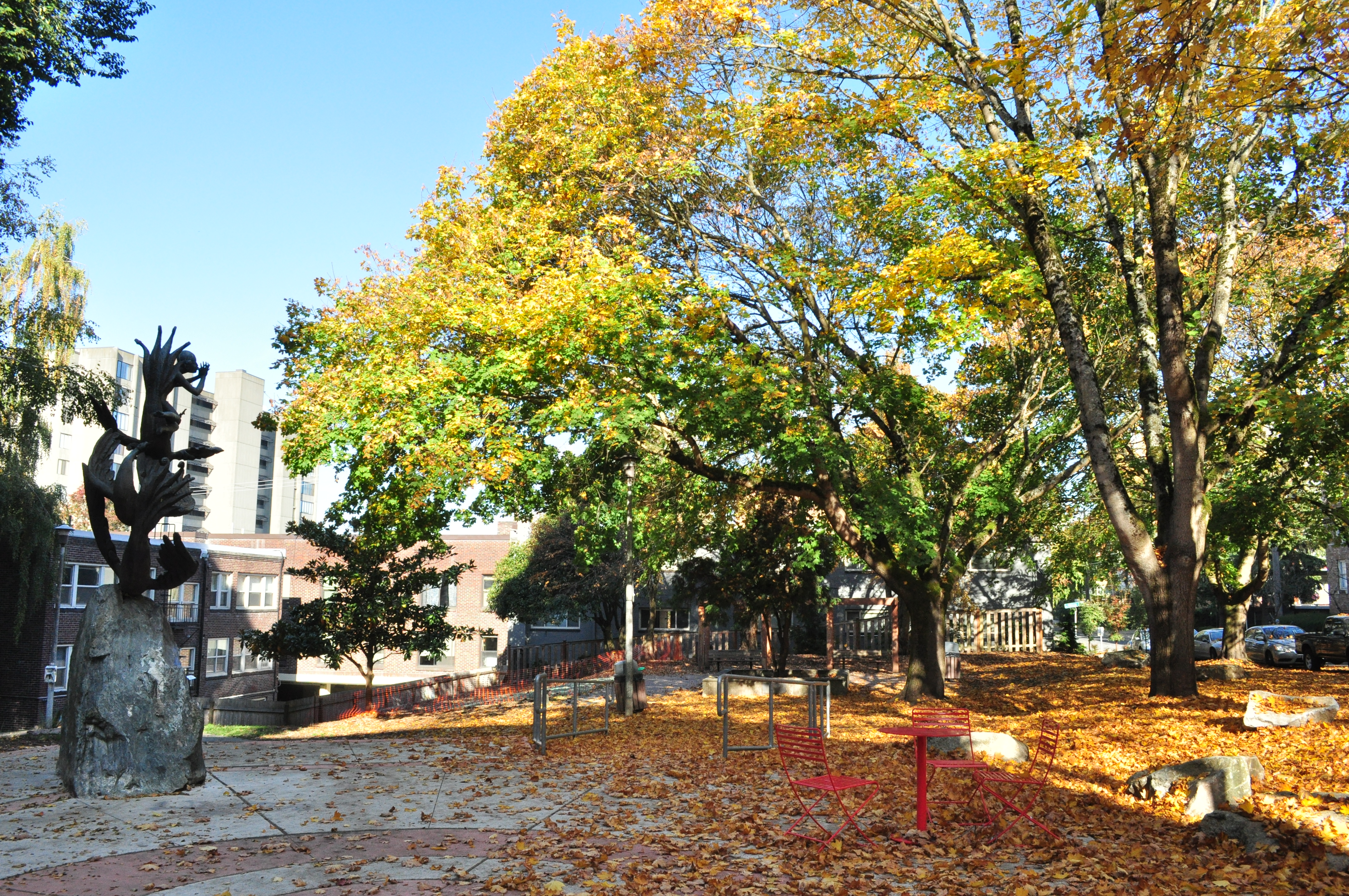
Sculpture in the park, 2017

Tashkent Park is a public park on Seattle's Capitol Hill, in the U.S. state of Washington. Dedicated in 1974, the park is named after Tashkent, Uzbekistan.

According to Curbed, "This little park bisects an apartment-filled block in Capitol Hill. In the middle of the day it has some sunny spots, but it's best for relaxing in the shade, with both a decently-sized lawn and a wide selection of seating options."
