= First Hill Park =

Public park in Seattle, Washington, U.S.

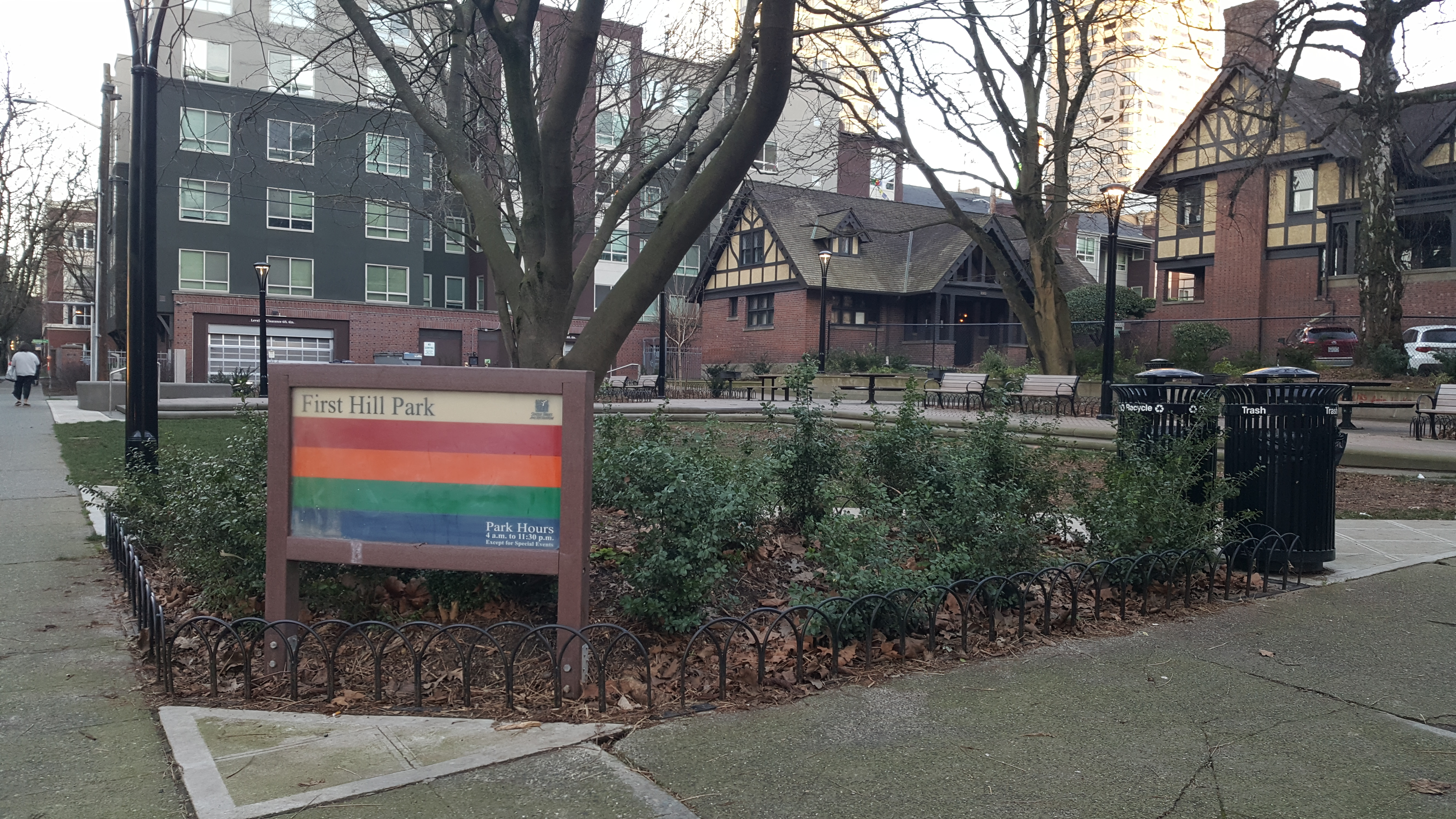
- The park in 2022
- Interactive map of First Hill Park
- Location: Seattle, Washington, U.S.
- Coordinates: 47°36′43″N 122°19′32″W

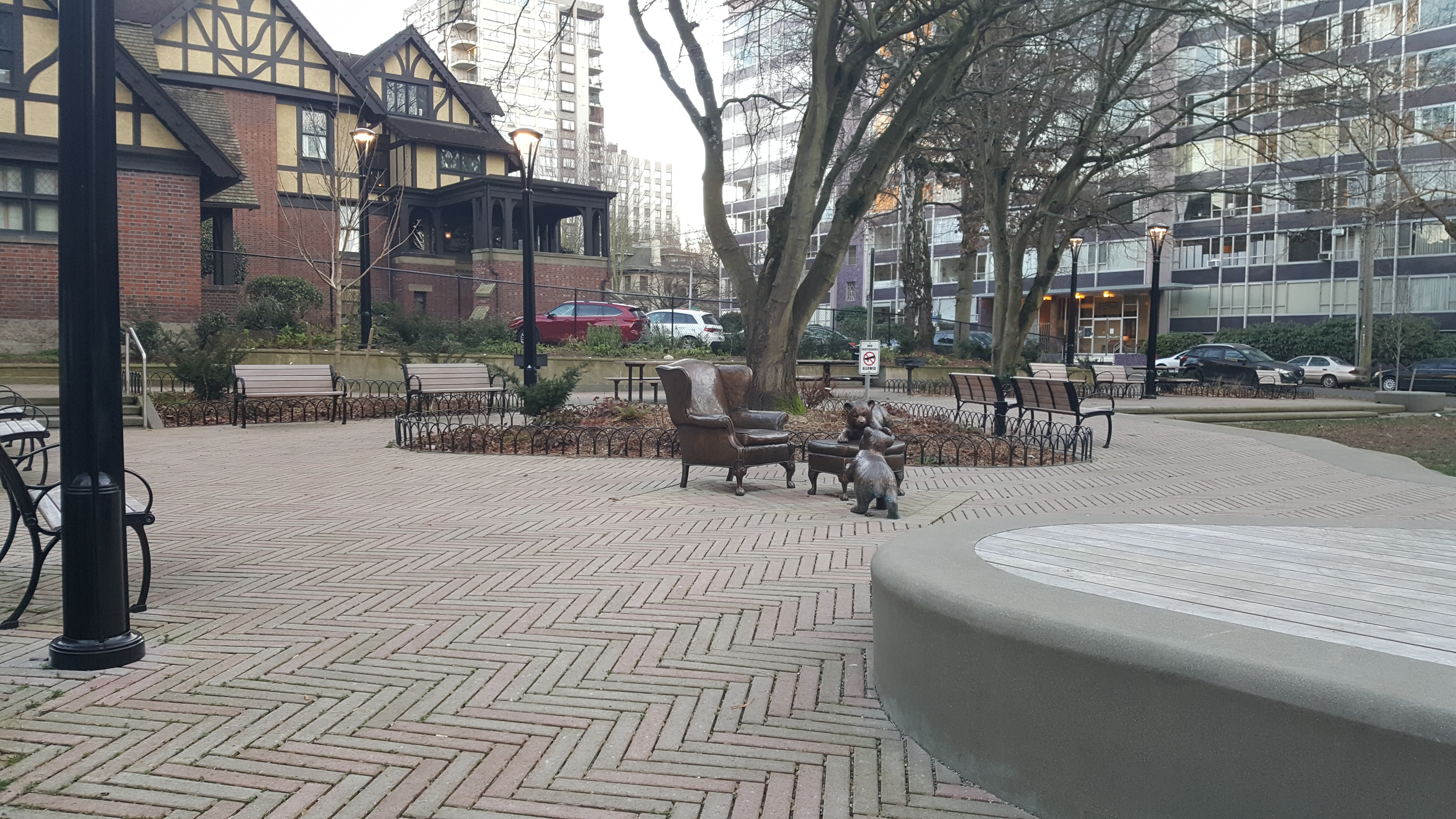
Sculpture in the park, 2022

First Hill Park is a public park in Seattle's First Hill neighborhood, in the United States. The park opened in 1987 and underwent a renovation in 2021.
