= Ballard Commons Park =

Park in Seattle, Washington, U.S.

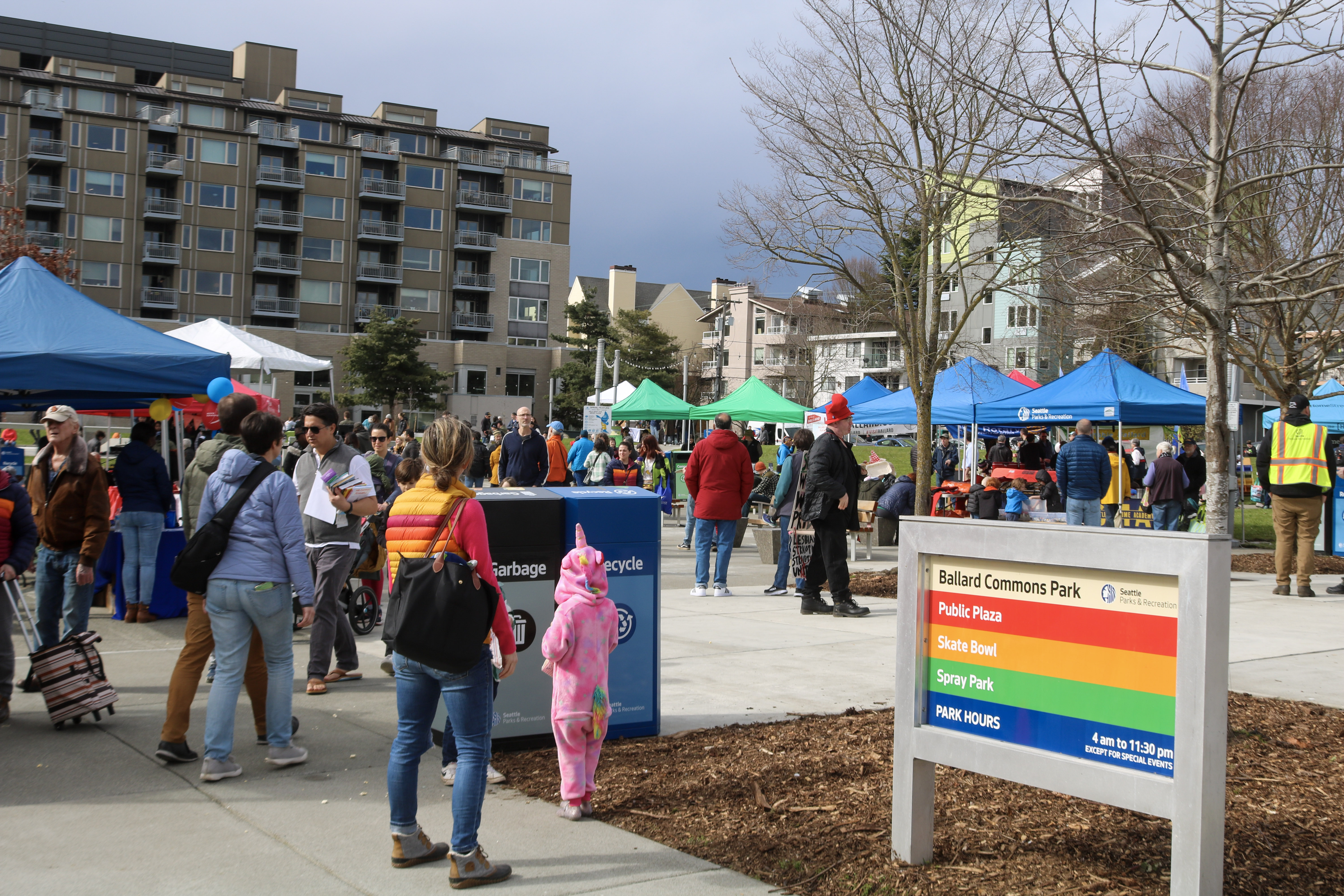
- The park's reopening in March 2023
- Interactive map of Ballard Commons Park
- Location: Ballard, Seattle, Washington, United States
- Coordinates: 47°40′14″N 122°23′8″W

Ballard Commons Park is a public park in Ballard, Seattle, in the U.S. state of Washington.

Following the December 2021 clearing of a large encampment, the park reopened in March 2023.
