= Chief Sealth Trail =

Multi-use trail in Seattle, Washington, United States

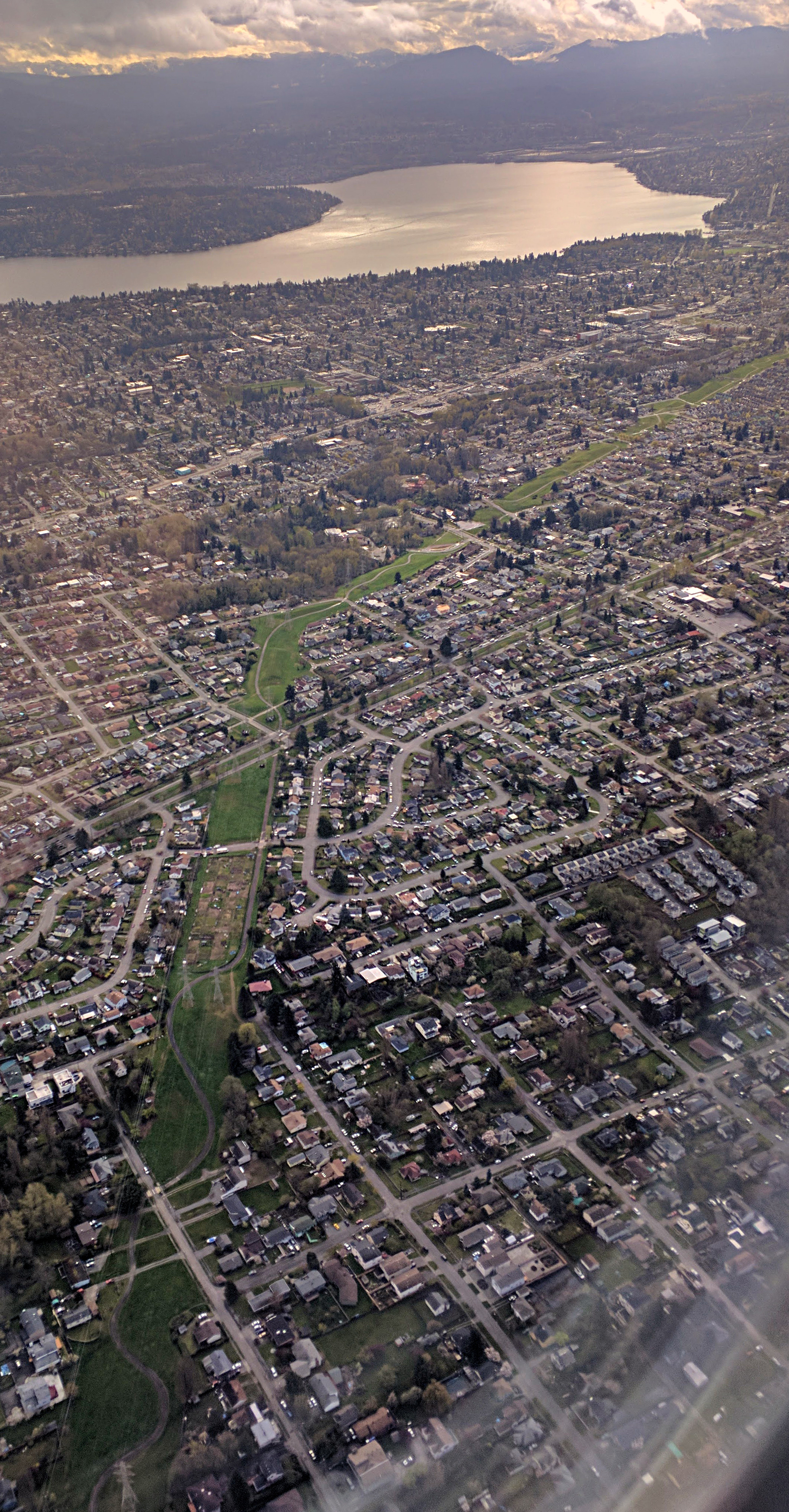
- The Chief Sealth Trail in Seattle, along the Seattle City Light transmission right of way – the green strip in this aerial view
- Interactive map of Chief Sealth Trail
- Nearest city: Seattle, Washington
- Coordinates: 47°30′45″N 122°15′55.08″W
- Hiking trails: 4.3 miles (6.9 km)
- Public transit: King County Metro

The Chief Sealth Trail is a multi-use recreational trail in Seattle, Washington.

The 3.6-mile (6 km) trail, which opened on May 12, 2007, follows the Seattle City Light transmission right-of-way from S. Angeline Street and 15th Avenue S. in Beacon Hill, near Jefferson Park, to S. Gazelle Street and 51st Avenue S. in Rainier Valley, near Kubota Gardens. Extensions are planned northward to Downtown and southward to the city limits.

The trail was constructed from the recycling of excavated soils and concrete from the construction of Link light rail along Martin Luther King Jr. Way in South Seattle. The trail is 4.3 miles (7 km) long.
