= Seattle Parks and Recreation =

Parks and recreation department of the City of Seattle

Department of Parks and Recreation

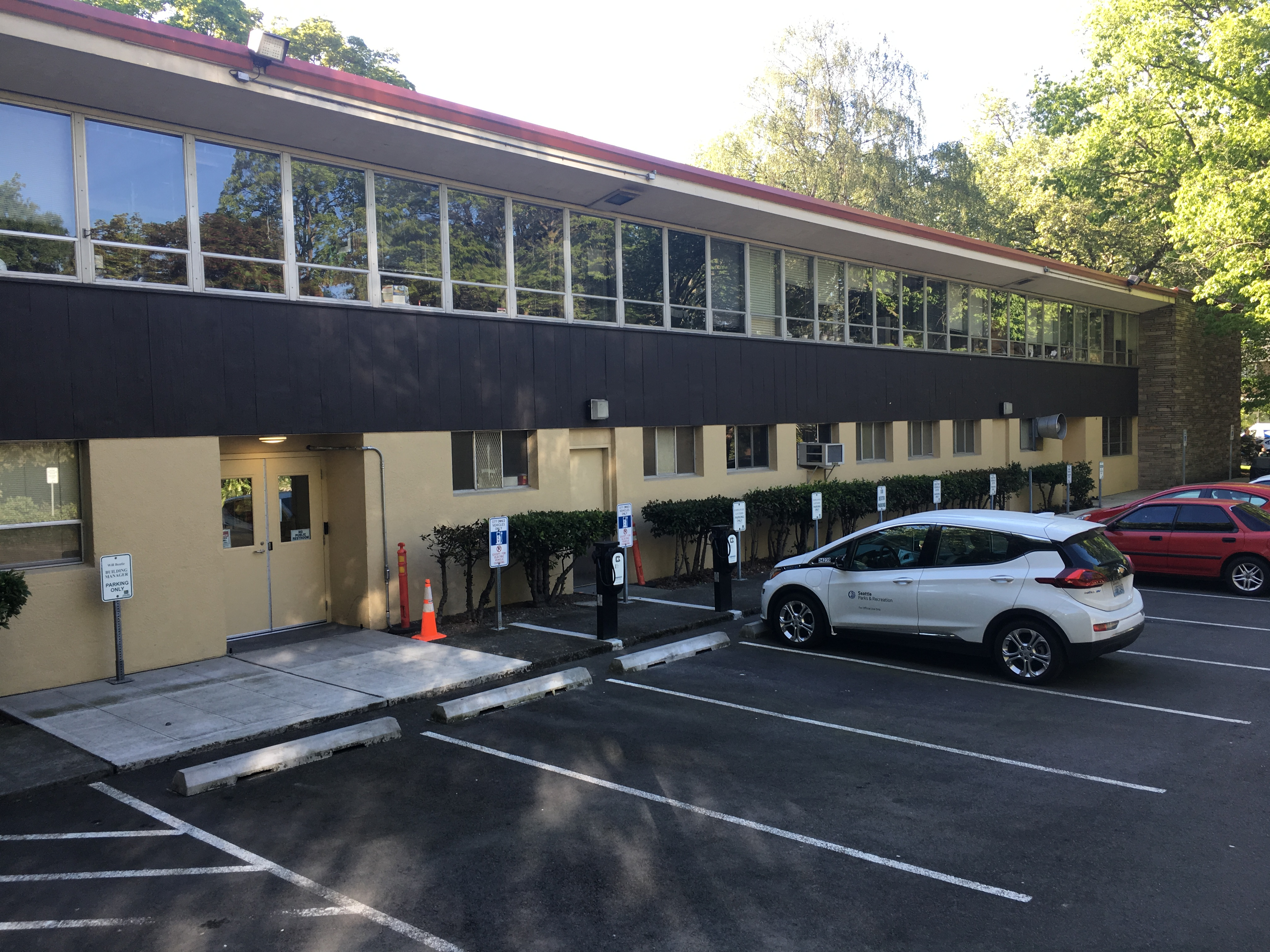
- Seattle Parks and Recreation headquarters in 2019

Department overview
- Formed: 1887
- Jurisdiction: City of Seattle
- Headquarters: 100 Dexter Ave N Seattle, Washington, U.S.; 47.619195°N 122.341928°W
- Department executive: AP Diaz, Superintendent of Parks and Recreation
- Key document: Parks Code of the City of Seattle
- Website: seattle.gov/parks

Seattle Parks and Recreation (officially the Department of Parks and Recreation (DPR)) is the government department responsible for maintaining the parks, open spaces, and community centers of the city of Seattle, Washington. The department maintains properties covering an area of over 6,200 acres (25 km^{2}), which is equivalent to roughly 11% of the city's total area. Of those 6,200 acres (25 km^{2}), 4,600 acres (19 km^{2}) are developed.

As of 2007, the department managed 450 parks, 485 buildings, and 22 miles (35 km) of boulevards, with facilities including 185 athletic fields, 122 children's playgrounds, four golf courses, 151 outdoor tennis courts and an indoor tennis center, 26 community centers and two outdoor and eight indoor swimming pools. It also maintains fishing piers, boat ramps, the Volunteer Park conservatory, the Washington Park Arboretum, the Seattle Aquarium, and Woodland Park Zoo.

The department's operating budget in 2007 was US$117 million. Its largest park is Discovery Park in Magnolia, while the oldest is Denny Park in South Lake Union. Seattle Parks and Recreation is run by a superintendent and advised by a volunteer Board of Park Commissioners.

== History ==
=== Early Seattle parks ===
The Seattle Board of Park Commissioners was established in 1887 to oversee the city's first park, then known simply as Seattle Park. Originally the Seattle Cemetery, the site was donated in 1884 by Seattle pioneer David Denny. (The park is today named Denny Park in his honor.) In 1892 the position of Park Supervisor was created, with E.O. Schwagerl being the office's inaugural holder. There was no budget at the time to purchase parks, but Schwagerl envisioned parks extending north along the Lake Washington shore from the Bailey Peninsula (today's Seward Park) to Madison Park with a boulevard along roughly the northern third of this area, from Leschi to Madison Park.

It was no coincidence that Schwagerl would single out Leschi and Madison Parks. Both of these stood on the lakeshore at the end of trolley lines and were already privately developed as parks of a sort by the promoters of those lines. Leschi had a hotel, cottages, and footpaths leading through virgin forest, and John Cort built a six-story casino there in 1892, which was also a prominent early vaudeville venue. John J. McGilvra's Madison Park had cottages and tent platforms, but also an amusement park. George K. Beede's 500-seat Madison Park Pavilion had a baseball park (eventually used by an early incarnation of the Northwest League), excursion boats touring the lake, and eventually a track for horse racing.

Beede's and Cort's facilities both began by offering family entertainment, but eventually became beer halls. Madison Park was refurbished for the 1909 Alaska-Yukon-Pacific Exposition (A-Y-P Exposition) as White City Park. Leschi Park, which had become less profitable, was purchased outright by the city at that time. Madison Park also became less profitable (especially after Washington state adopted prohibition of alcohol in 1916) and was eventually sold to the city parks system. Madrona Park on Lake Washington and Alki Beach, originally reachable from downtown Seattle only by water, share a similar history.

=== Rise of the parks system ===
In the 1890s - long before the city took over the commercial parks - George F. Cotterill, assistant city engineer and chairman of the Paths Committee of the Queen City Good Roads Club, organized volunteers to build 25 miles (40 km) of bicycle paths, mainly along the lake. He was possibly inspired in this venture by the ideas of Schwagerl. In 1903, the park commissioners hired the Olmsted Brothers to design a comprehensive plan for the city's parks. They used Cotterill's bicycle paths as the basis of a citywide plan for a system of boulevards and parks.

The Olmsted plan had both populist and elitist elements. On the one hand, it intended to place a park or playground within half a mile (800 m) of every home in the city. On the other hand, their boulevards connected wealthy residential neighborhoods and bypassed the tawdrier popular amusement areas. For example, Lake Washington Boulevard bypassed the Leschi waterfront, leaving the lake shore and passing through the uplands. The Olmsted plan became a de facto plan for the city's development.

By 1917, nearly all of the major Seattle parks of today already existed. Woodland and Washington Parks were purchased in 1900. From 1903, Woodland Park on Phinney Ridge was home to a zoo that had previously been privately operated at Leschi. Most of Washington Park would become an arboretum in 1941.

In 1904 the city charter was revised by initiative. The new charter enhanced the power of the Park Board, which it brought out from under the control of Seattle City Council and gave authority over not only parks but also playgrounds, parkways, and boulevards; the board was additionally granted its own tax base. Over the next eight years, voters approved $4 million in bond issues for the purchase of parklands. Seward Park (Bailey Peninsula) and Ravenna Park north of the University District were obtained before the 1909 A-Y-P Exposition using the right of eminent domain. Further lakeshore lands were gained from the state in 1913 with assistance from Hiram Chittenden of the Port of Seattle. The resulting construction and landscaping projects made the Park Board a significant employer, especially during times when the economy slackened.

=== Continued development of the system ===
In February 1968, as part of the Forward Thrust program, Seattle passed a $118 million bond issue in support of the Department of Parks and Recreation. At the time, it was the largest parks and recreation bond issue ever passed in the United States.

As of 2025, Seattle has 14 off-leash dog parks and prohibits dogs from many of its facilities. The city's Find It, Fix It app is used to report violations of dog rules at parks; in 2024, there were 1,100 complaints categorized as "nuisance dogs in a park".

== See also ==
- List of parks in Seattle

== Bibliography ==
- Berner, Richard C. (1991), Seattle 1900-1920: From Boomtown, Urban Turbulence, to Restoration, Seattle: Charles Press, ISBN 0-9629889-0-1.
