= Olympic Hills, Seattle =

Neighborhood in Seattle, Washington, United States

Coordinates: 47°43′35.2″N 122°18′9.3″W

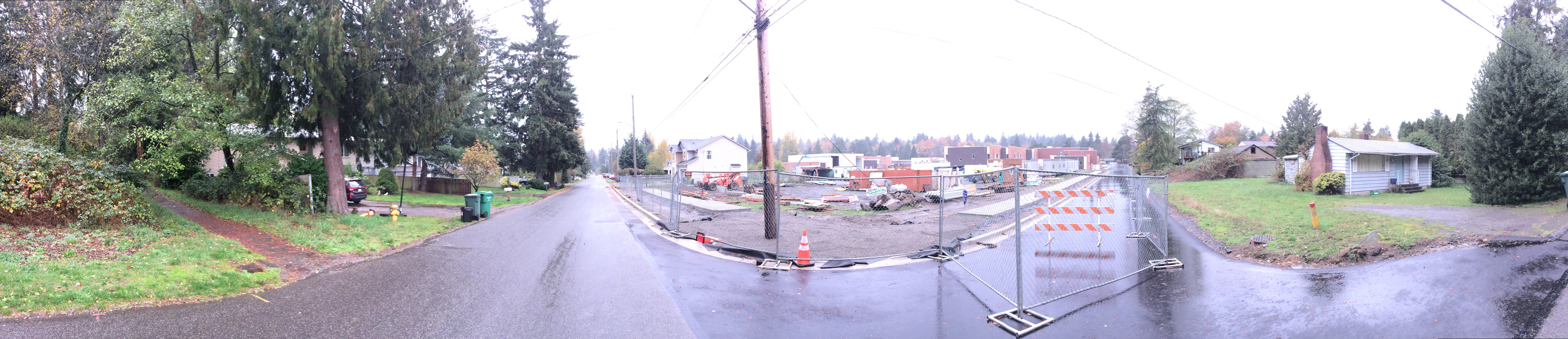
Olympic Hills residential area with new construction on 23 Ave. NE

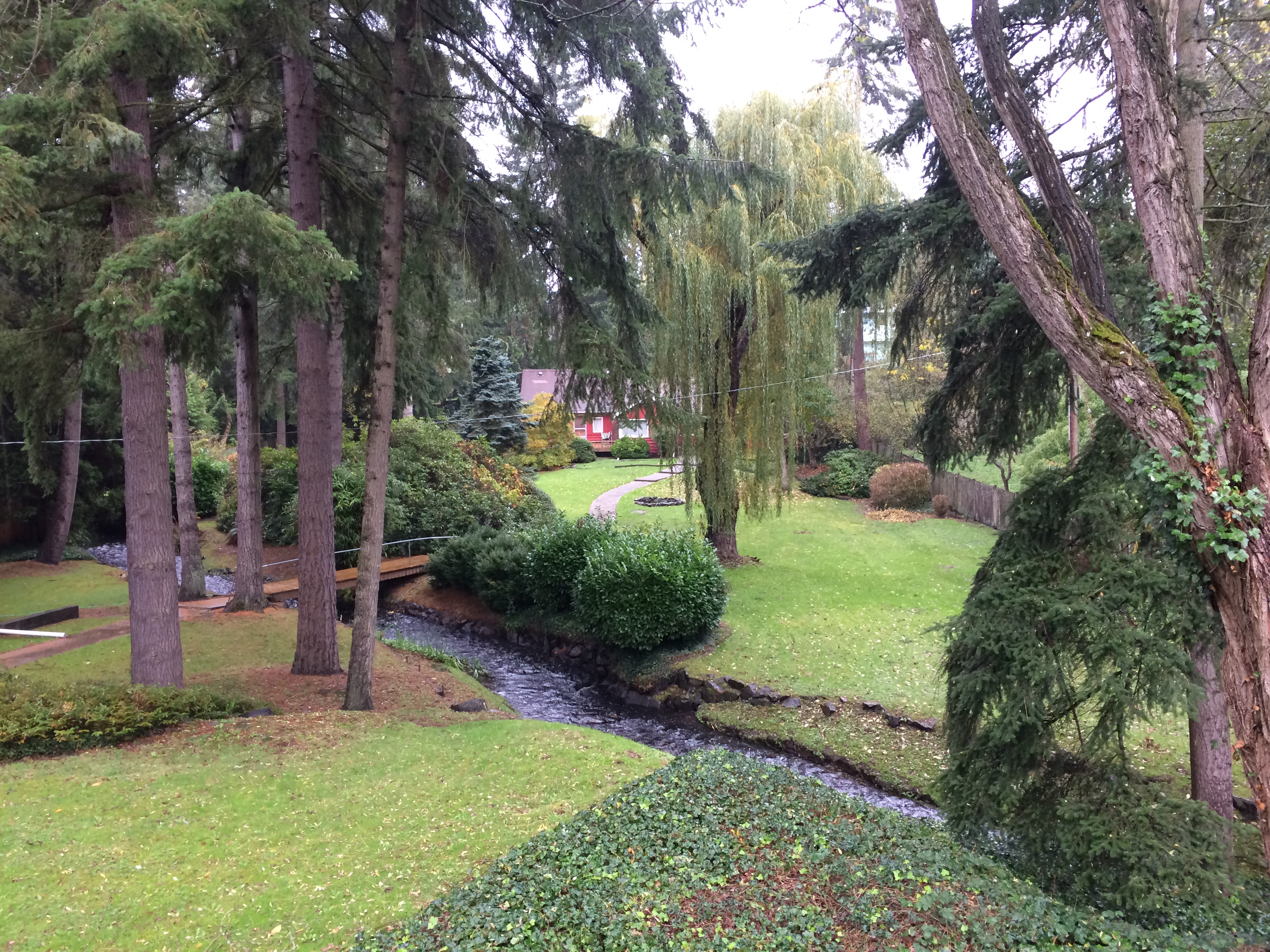
Thornton Creek, running from Olympic Hills into the adjacent Victory Heights neighborhood

Olympic Hills is a neighborhood in the Lake City district of Seattle, Washington.

The architecture is very diverse, ranging from homes displaced from the Interstate 5 construction, to newer construction.

In 1935, Will Rogers played his last game of polo in this verdant neighborhood north of Seattle. The Olympic Riding Club with its Stables and Polo Field was located across the street from the Jackson Golf Course which was built in 1930. The field was between N.E.135th St. and N.E.137th St. along 15th Ave. N.E. to 20th Ave. N.E. It was surrounded by stately poplar trees and in the distance rose the green, rolling Olympic Hills. A monument to Will Rogers was placed at the field, but later moved to Albert Davis Park. Albert Davis Park is behind the Lake City Library which is a historic landmark. In the late 1930s, prior to the riding club being sold and divided into single family home lots, the suburbs were forming in the area and hill to the east from 21st to 27th St, from 135th to 140th Ave. NE was being subdivided and developed into an area advertised as Olympic Village. On Sunday, May 7, 1939 multiple lots were auctioned off for what was expected to cost $200-$300.

Thornton Creek runs through the neighborhood as it makes its way to Lake Washington. The Olympic Hills neighborhood is part of the Lake City district which includes the neighborhoods of Cedar Park, Matthews Beach, Meadowbrook, and Victory Heights.

Albert Davis Park, located in the Olympic Hills neighborhood, was a gift to the City of Seattle in 1964, it is named after Albert Davis, a Lake City community leader who died in 1971. Born in Buffalo, New York, in 1890, Davis was a charter member of the Lake City Vigilantes, a member of the Keystone Kops, originated the annual salmon barbecue with his Secret Seasoning, spearheaded the Lake City Pioneer Days celebration, was active in the Youth Center, and served as the unofficial goodwill "ambassador-mayor" of Lake City. He was awarded the Golden Acorn award by the PTA in 1971.

Homer Kelly, author of The Golfing Machine, taught golfing lessons at the Jackson Golf Course. He and his wife Rosella are buried at the Acacia Memorial Park which is north of Lake City. Golfers still practice at the public course and there is a perimeter trail where neighbors can enjoy a bit of nature just west of this urban neighborhood.
