= Lake City =

Lake City may refer to:

== Places ==
- Lake City, Arkansas
- Lake City, California (disambiguation)
- Lake City, Modoc County, California
- Lake City, Nevada County, California
- Lake City, Colorado
- Lake City, Florida
- Lake City, Georgia
- Lake City, Illinois
- Lake City, Iowa
- Lake City, Kansas
- Lake City, Michigan
- Lake City, Minnesota
- Lake City, Pennsylvania
- Lake City, South Carolina
- Lake City, South Dakota
- Lake City, Texas
- Rocky Top, Tennessee, a town formerly named Lake City, Tennessee
- Lake City, Seattle, Washington, a neighborhood district

== Schools ==
Lake City, as a school name, may also refer to any of the following schools:

- Lake City High School (Idaho)
- Lake City High School (South Carolina)
- Jagran Lakecity University, private university in Bhopal, Madhya Pradesh, India

== Nickname ==
Lake City, as a city nickname, may also refer to any of the following cities:

- Bhopal, Madhya Pradesh, India
- Coeur d'Alene, Idaho
- Lake Charles, Louisiana
- Lohja, Finland
- Plattsburgh, New York

== Other uses ==
- Lake City (film), a 2008 American drama film
- Lake City Army Ammunition Plant
- Lake City Way station, a SkyTrain station often referred to as "Lake City" in official notices and signage
- Lakecity FC, association football club based in Bhopal, Madhya Pradesh, India

== See also ==
- Lake (disambiguation)
- Lake Town (disambiguation)
- Salt Lake City (disambiguation)
- City of Lakes (disambiguation)
