= Matthews Beach Park =

Lakefront park in Seattle, Washington, United States

Matthews Beach park
- Matthews Beach
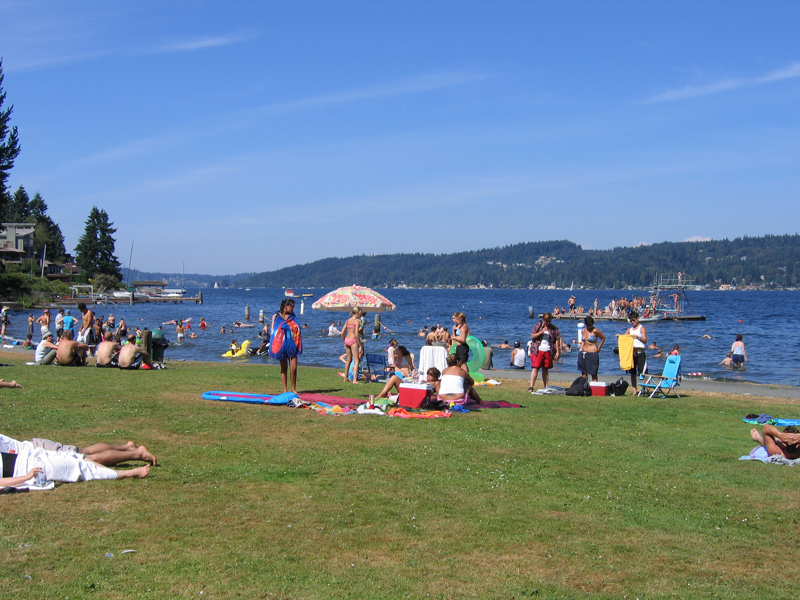
- Lake Washington as seen from Matthews Beach

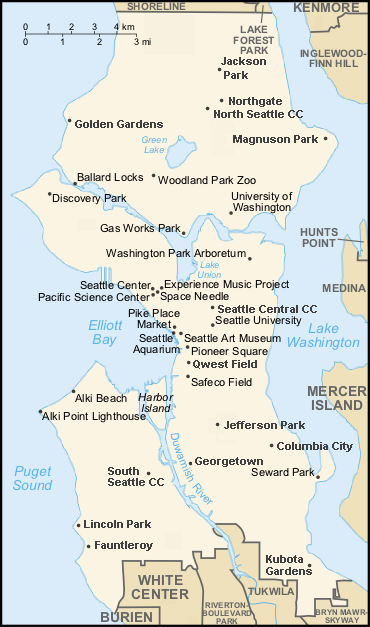
- Location within Seattle
- Type: Urban park
- Location: Seattle, Washington
- Coordinates: 47.6966°N 122.2733°W
- Area: 22 acres (0.089 km^{2})
- Created: 1951
- Operator: City of Seattle
- Status: Open year round
- Website: www.seattle.gov/parks/park_detail.asp?id=347

Matthews Beach Park is a 22-acre (0.9 km^{2}) park in the Matthews Beach neighborhood of Seattle, Washington. It is a popular swimming beach in the summer, although it is also open during winter months.

The park also hosts an annual "Polar Bear Plunge" sponsored by Seattle Parks and Recreation on New Year's Day.

== Geography ==
Matthews Beach Park is in a residential area on the shore of Ponitac Bay, on the west shore of Lake Washington. It is bordered on the west by the Burke-Gilman Trail and on the east by Matthews Beach, its namesake. The Matthews Beach, Seattle Neighborhood is also named for the same beach. Thornton Creek empties into Lake Washington at the southern end of the park.

== History ==
The area has been Inhabited since the last glacial period. The people living around Lake Washington were collectively known as the hah-choo-AHBSH, "People of the Large Lake", as opposed to the doo-AHBSH, "People of the Inside", who lived around Elliott Bay, the Cedar River, and the Green River. Both groups were part of the Duwamish Tribe and spoke Lushootseed. The village of too-HOO-beed was of the too-oh-beh-DAHBSH extended family and was near what is now called Thornton Creek in what is now Matthews Beach, near Meadowbrook.

In the 1880s, pioneer John G. Matthews, namesake of the modern-day park, established a homestead near what is now Matthews Beach. The park was incorporated into Seattle Parks and Recreation in 1951.

== Amenities ==
The main attraction of the park is the swimming beach, open during summer months. During summer months, a diving platform is anchored offshore, and the beach is staffed by lifeguards. The park also features a playground, locker rooms, and several picnic tables and barbecue pits.

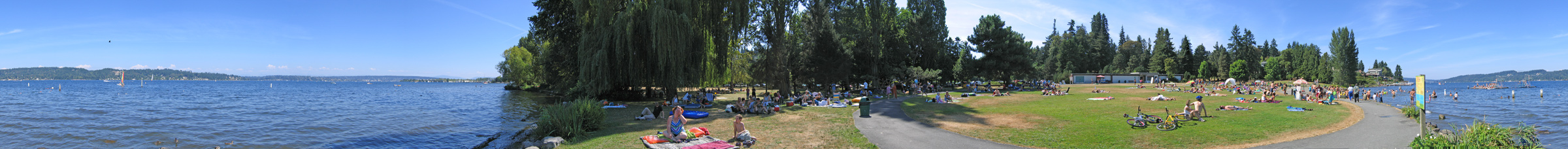
A panorama of Matthews Beach, taken from near the southern end of the beach.

== See also ==
- Lake City, Seattle, Washington, the neighborhood in which the Matthew's beach neighborhood is located
