= Thornton Creek =

Creek in North Seattle that empties into Lake Washington

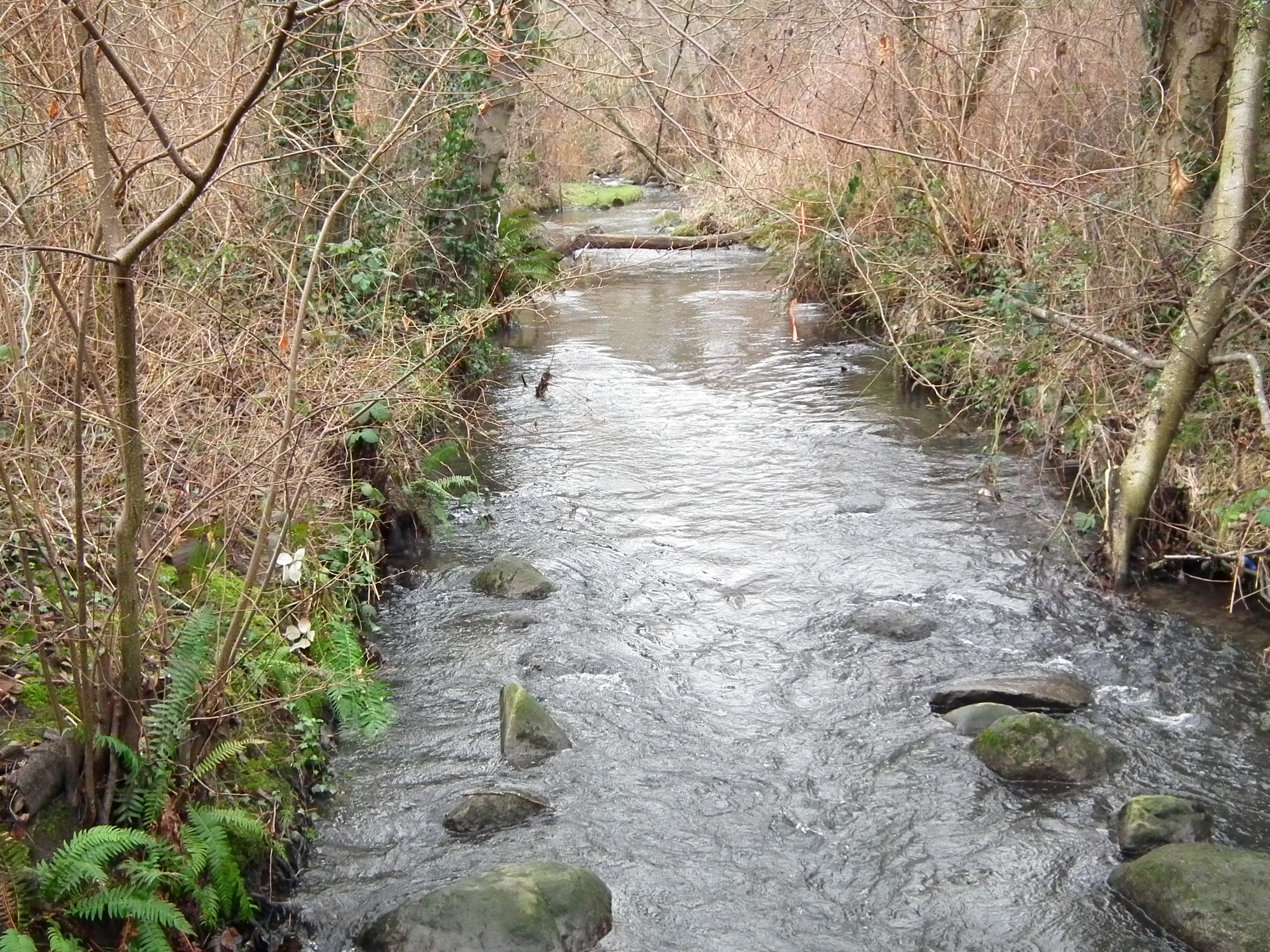

- Location of the mouth of Thornton Creek in Washington Thornton Creek (the United States)

Location
- Country: United States
- State: Washington
- County: King

Physical characteristics
- Source: Cromwell Park, Shoreline (north fork)
  - location: North Seattle College and environs (south fork)
  - coordinates: 47°43′45″N 122°19′13″W
- Mouth: Lake Washington
  - coordinates: 47°41′42″N 122°16′17″W
- Length: 18 mi (29 km)
- Basin size: 12.1 sq mi (31 km^{2})
- Discharge
  - location: USGS gage 12128000, river mile 0.25
  - average: 11.3 cu ft/s (0.32 m^{3}/s)
  - minimum: 0.39 cu ft/s (0.011 m^{3}/s)
  - maximum: 129 cu ft/s (3.7 m^{3}/s)

Thornton Creek is 18 miles (29 km) of urban creeks and tributaries from southeast Shoreline through northeast Seattle to Lake Washington. Its 12-square-mile (31 km^{2}) watershed, the largest in Seattle, exhibits relatively dense biodiversity for an urban setting; it is home to frogs, newts, ducks, herons, and beavers, in addition to more than 75,000 people. From west of Jackson Park Golf Course in North Seattle, from Sunny Walter-Pillings Pond in Licton Springs–North College Park, and north Northgate Thornton Creek flows through Maple Leaf and Lake City, including the Victory Heights, Meadowbrook, and Matthews Beach neighborhoods, and empties into the lake at Matthews Beach Park.

== Habitat and stewardship ==
Thornton Creek flows through Meadowbrook Pond, known for its birdwatching and resident beavers. The Thornton creek watershed is land formerly inhabited by the Duwamish tribe. One of the Duwamish's historic longhouse sites was located near the mouth of Thornton Creek at Mathews beach. Early in the 1900s, the creek contained dense runs of at least five species of Pacific salmon and trout. Today, only a few Kokanee still travel up stream. The areas surrounding the creek were developed without regard for that habitat and the riparian corridor; species' diversity declined, and the creek became a typical degraded urban watershed. Storm water retention, sites restoration, an Environmental Learning Center next to a school, and a fish ladder contributed to restoration and the return of native plants and wildlife. Thornton creek is home to many native species of muskrats, beavers, otters, bats, crayfish and coyotes, and in addition, is an important breeding ground for great blue herons. Common for urban creeks, there are also many problematic invasive species like Japanese knotweed, black rats and New Zealand mud snails.

== Thornton Creek Water Quality Channel ==
For many decades, much of the stream has run through culverts, notably under the parking lot south of Northgate Mall. Building on gradual successes in restoration, activist neighbors began working with the City of Seattle and developers toward daylighting parts of the buried creek.

In 2004, the City of Seattle purchased the 2.4-acre (0.97 ha) parking lot from Northgate Mall and began building the Thornton Creek Water Quality Channel. Opened in 2009, it achieved several community goals in limited space: integrating a water-quality facility, providing a diverse housing mix, and allowing public open space. It receives and treats runoff from 680 acres (280 ha) by providing a multilayered landscape of native plants that also serves as an amenity for surrounding private development.

Organizations of citizens have cleaned up nearby wetlands, educated the public about stream health and quality of neighborhood life, and rallied to bring more of the creek to daylight. Many restoration projects in Seattle have been in some way connected to or inspired by Thornton Creek.

== Neighborhoods of the Thornton Creek watershed ==
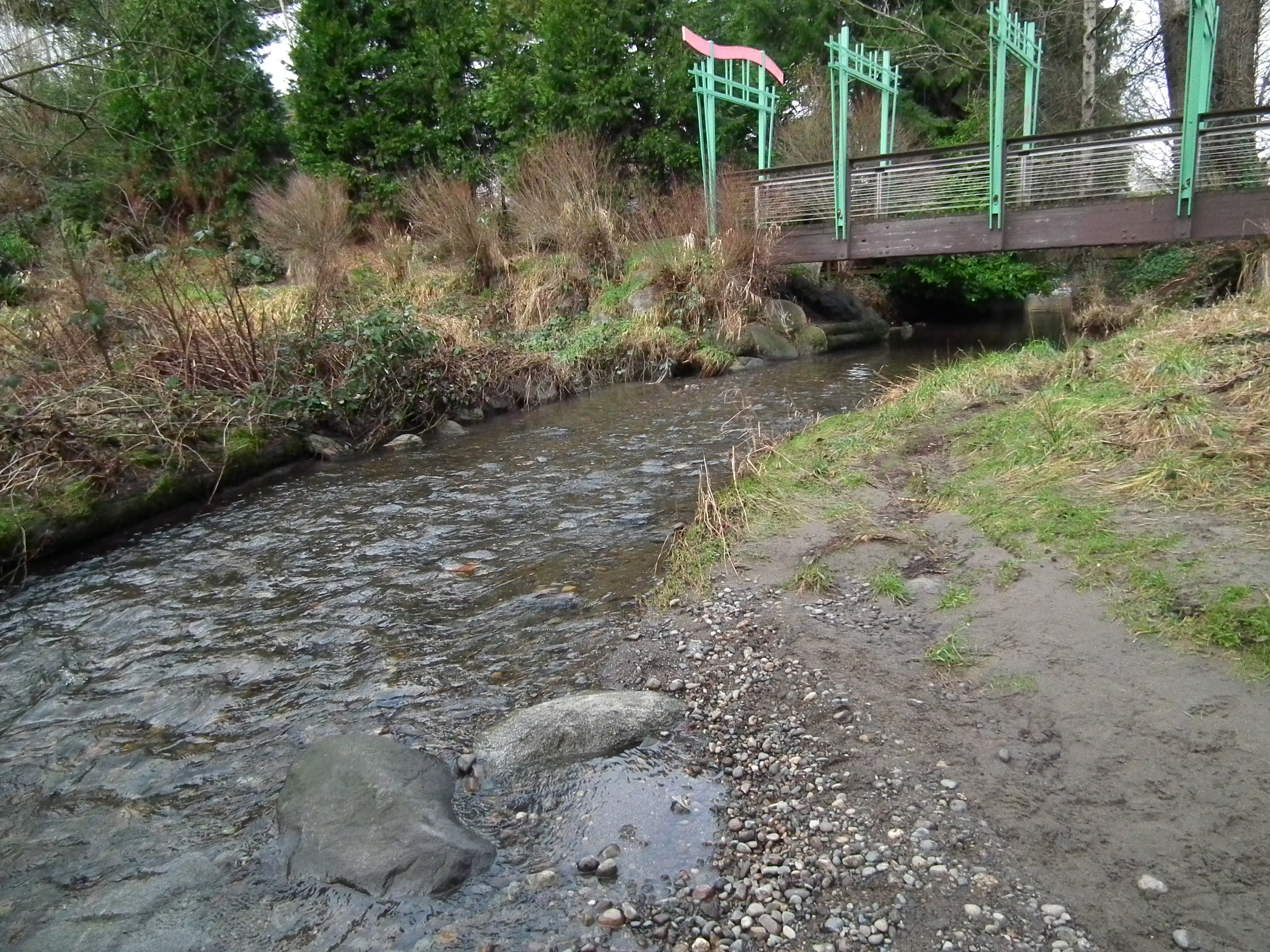
Thornton Creek near Meadowbrook Pond

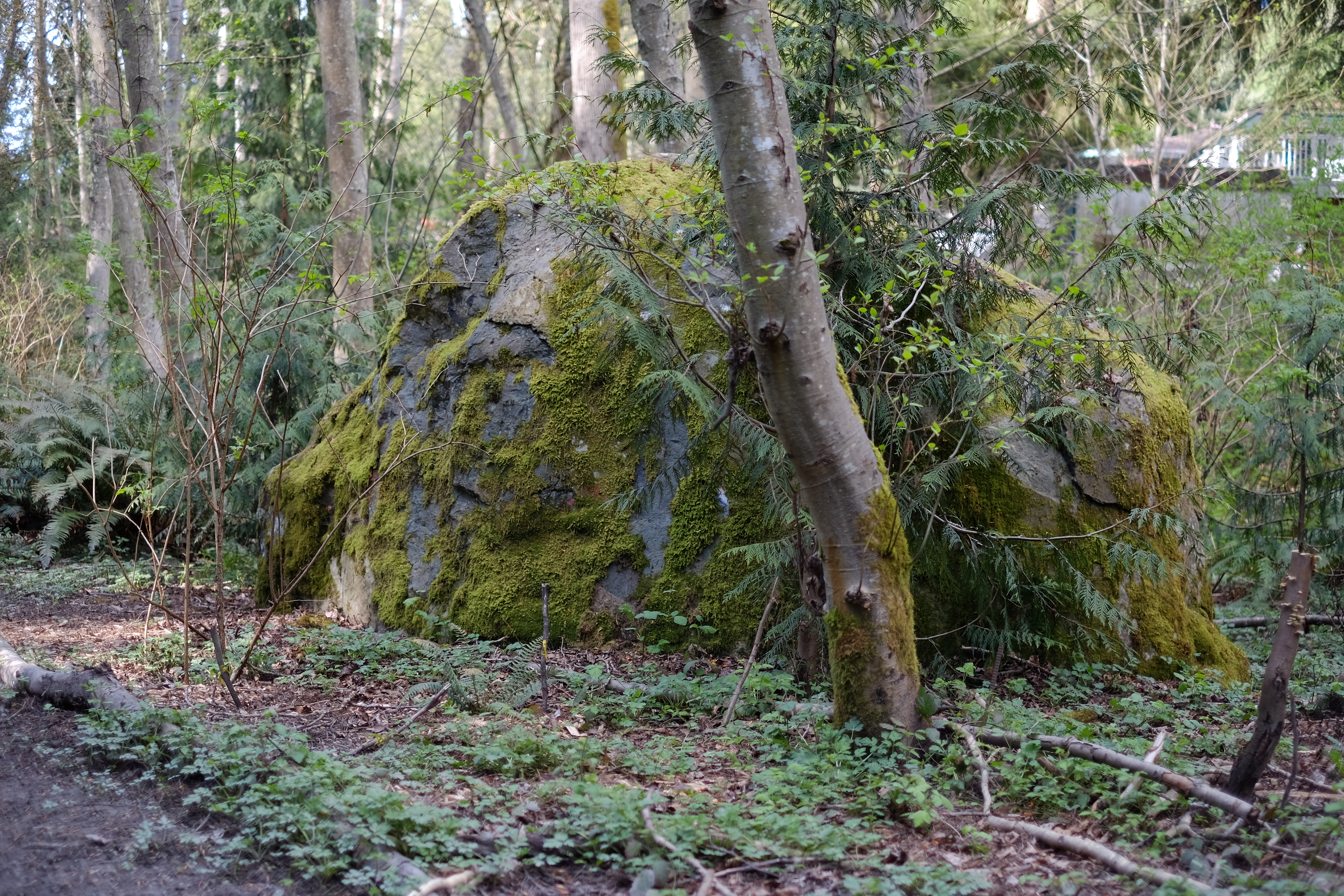
The Thornton Creek glacial erratic located southwest of 17th Ave NE and NE 104th St., in Seattle Parks' Kingfisher Natural Area

- Southeast neighborhoods of the city of Shoreline, north fork headwaters
- Lake City neighborhoods
  - Olympic Hills
  - Victory Heights
  - Meadowbrook, confluence of forks
  - Matthews Beach
- Northgate neighborhoods
  - Pinehurst
  - Licton Springs–North College Park, south fork headwaters
  - Maple Leaf
  - Northgate Mall

== See also ==
- List of rivers of Washington (state)
- Daylighting (streams)
- Neighborhoods of Ravenna Creek
- Water resources
- Boeing Creek
- Ravenna Creek
- Yesler Creek

== Bibliography ==
- Bowditch, Elise; Wang, Man; Wilson, Matthew (2002-01-30). "North Seattle Community College Trail Siting". GEOG461 Urban GIS, Department of Geography. University of Washington. Archived from the original on 2006-09-17.
  Elise Bowditch, Teaching Assistant; Man Wang, Teaching Assistant; Matthew W. Wilson, Research Associate.
- Boyer, Tom (2005-09-21). "Parking lot to become park for Northgate". Business & Technology. The Seattle Times.
- Brokaw, Michael (n.d.). "Grounds Department Wetland". North Seattle Community College Grounds Maintenance. Archived from the original on November 15, 2004.
- Dolan, Maria; True, Kathryn (2003). "North Seattle Community College Wetlands". Nature in the city: Seattle. Seattle: Mountaineers Books. pp. 242–7. ISBN 0-89886-879-3.
- Hodson, Jeff (2000-02-16). "Restoration urged for Thornton Creek : Local News". The Seattle Times. Archived from the original on 2008-04-21.
  Was , NF.
- "Thornton Creek Watershed". Homewaters Project. Archived from the original on 2006-06-20.
- "Licton Springs Neighborhood: Local Interest". Licton Springs Community Council. Winter 2000. Archived from the original on 2006-06-02.
- Mulady, Kathy (2004-06-08). "Thornton Creek may see daylight again". Seattle Post-Intelligencer.
- "Otter and Spawning Salmon Sighted in Thornton Creek". The Seattle Press. 2000-10-18. Archived from the original on August 25, 2006.
  Archive of The Seattle Press.
- "Seattle Parks - Matthews". Seattle Parks and Recreation. 2004-08-18. Archived from the original on January 30, 2000.
  History excerpted from Morgan, Brandt. Enjoying Seattle's parks. Seattle: Greenwood Publications, 1979. ISBN 0-933576-01-3
- "Meadowbrook Pond". Title of Complete Work. Seattle Parks and Recreation. 2006. Archived from the original on 2006-02-17.
- "Thornton Creek". Restoration. Seattle Public Utilities. 2006. Archived from the original on 2012-12-30.
- Sheridan, Mimi; Tobin, Carol (n.d.). "A Neighborhood History". Licton Springs Community Council. Archived from the original on 2006-07-03.
- "Restoration Activities: A Few of Our Accomplishments". Thornton Creek Alliance, Seattle Community Network. n.d. Archived from the original on 2006-05-02.
- Walter, Sunny; local Audubon chapters (2006-02-10). "Sunny Walter's Washington Nature Weekends: Wildlife Viewing Locations - Greater Seattle Area". Archived from the original on 2005-03-22.
  Viewing locations only; the book has walks, hikes, wildlife, and natural wonders.
  Walter excerpted from
  - Dolan, Maria; True, Kathryn (2003). Nature in the city: Seattle. Seattle: Mountaineers Books. ISBN 0-89886-879-3.
    "with additions by Sunny Walter and local Audubon chapters." See "Northeast Seattle" section, bullet points "Meadowbrook", "Paramount Park Open Space", "North Seattle Community College Wetlands", and "Sunny Walter -- Twin Ponds".
