= Matthews Beach, Seattle =

- Seattle Neighborhood
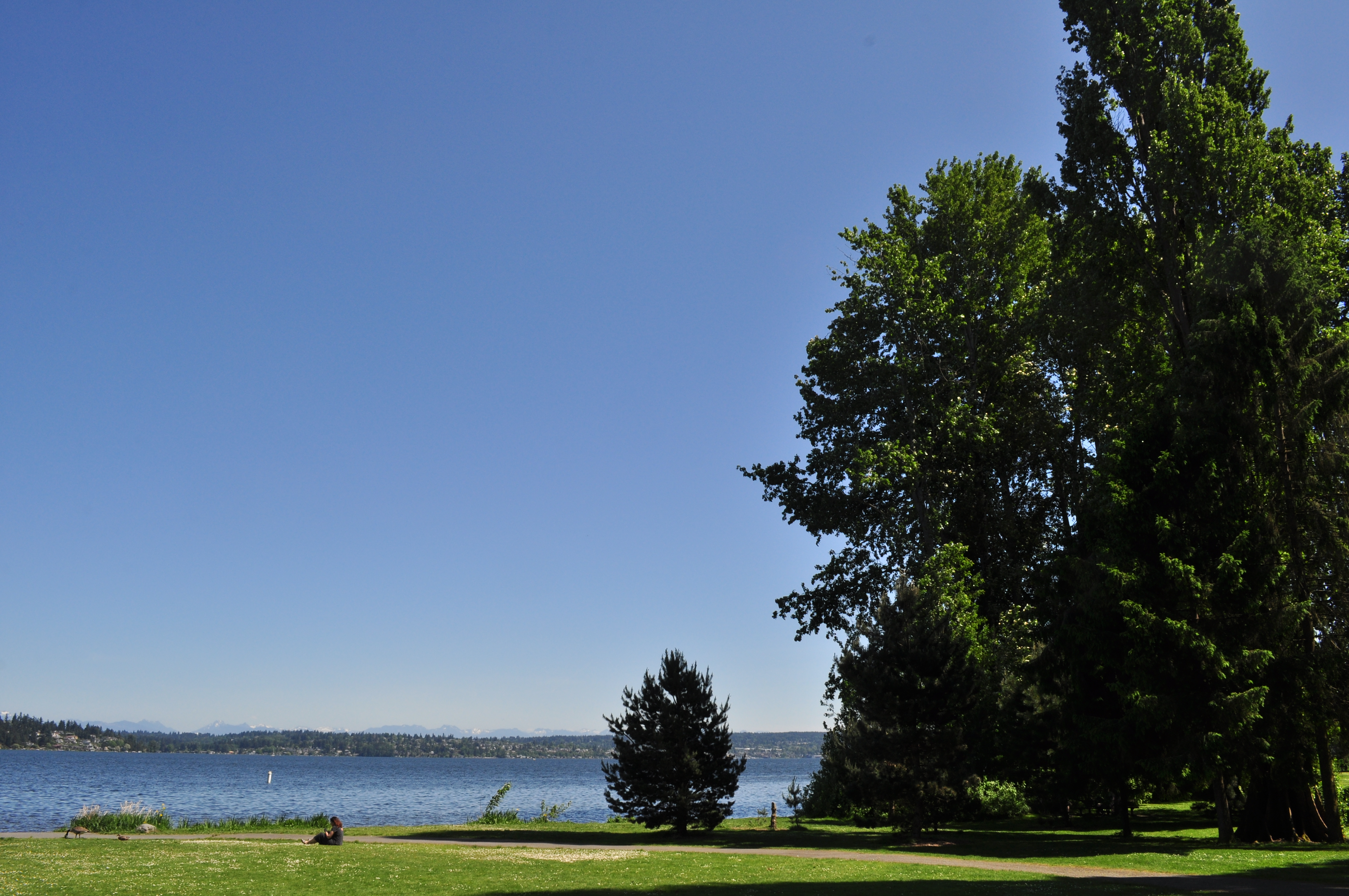
- Matthews Beach Park in the Matthews Beach neighborhood.

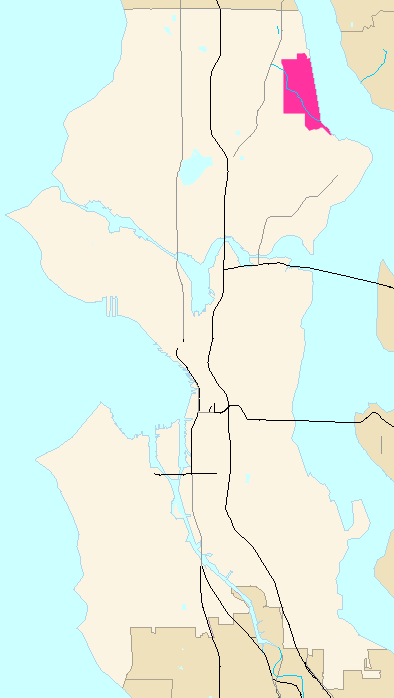
- Matthews Beach Highlighted in Pink
- Coordinates: 47°41′54″N 122°16′36″W
- Country: United States
- State: Washington
- County: King
- City: Seattle
- Named for: Matthews Beach Park
- ZIP Code: 98115
- Area code: 206, 564

Matthews Beach is a neighborhood in Seattle, Washington; it and Meadowbrook are the southern neighborhoods of the annexed township of Lake City (1954). Matthews Beach lies about 2 miles (3.2 km) northeast of the University of Washington, about 8 miles (13 km) northeast of Downtown.

The general boundaries of Matthews Beach are:

- bounded on the north by NE 120th Street and Lakeside Place NE, the Cedar Park neighborhood,
- on the east by Lake Washington;
- on the south by NE 95th Street and Paisley Drive NE, the Sand Point and View Ridge neighborhoods; and
- on the west by 35th and 45th avenues, the Meadowbrook neighborhood (see map.

Neighborhoods in Seattle are informal. The residents living west of Sand Point Way may consider themselves belonging to the adjacent neighborhoods of Meadowbrook or Wedgwood. The entirely residential neighborhood abuts Lake Washington and includes Matthews Beach, a seasonally popular city park with the largest Fresh water swimming beach in the city.

== History ==
Matthews Beach is named after John G. Matthews, who had his homestead on the site in the 1880s. What is now Matthews Beach neighborhood has been inhabited since the end of the last glacial period (c. 8,000 BCE—10,000 years ago). The tu-hoo-beed (Thornton Creek) hah-chu-ahbsh (Lake People) of the Duwamish (Dkhw’Duw’Absh, People of the Inside) tribe Lushootseed (Skagit-Nisqually) Coast Salish village was about 1/4 mile (0.40 km) north.

== Matthews Beach Park ==
The Burke–Gilman Trail borders Matthews Beach Park on the west and follows the course of the old Northern Pacific Railway line, originally of Judge Burke and Daniel Gilman's Seattle, Lake Shore and Eastern Railway (c. 1886). The low-lying areas of the park and adjacent neighborhood is a former wetland which surrounded the mouth of Thornton Creek. As with nearby Magnuson Park at Sand Point, most of the wetland disappeared when the Army Corps of Engineers lowered the lake in 1916 by building the Montlake Cut and the Lake Washington Ship Canal. The area south of the main beach was the site of Pan Am's offices and the dock for Pan Am’s Boeing "Clipper Ships"—the world’s first commercial air transports over ocean.

Matthews Beach Park now boasts a hilly knoll with towering Douglas firs and other trees, picnic tables, a playground, and a swimming beach with lifeguards and a diving platform in summer months. Thornton Creek empties at the southern end of the park, which has been partially rehabilitated to include a wildlife pond, native plants, and bird nesting areas. The Thornton Creek watershed has hosted at least five indigenous species of Pacific salmon and trout, and has been the subject of daylighting efforts at locations further upstream.

== Gallery ==
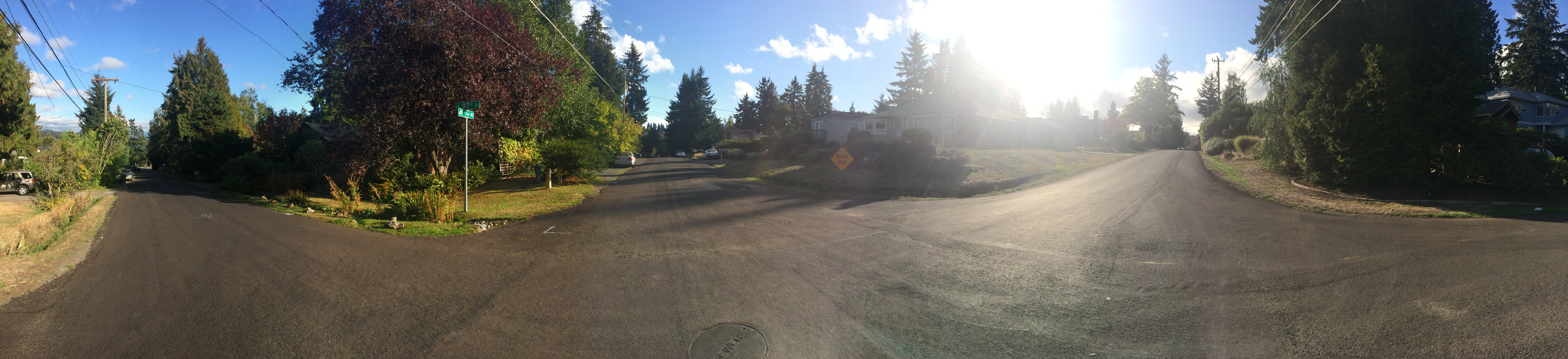
Residential area in Matthews Beach

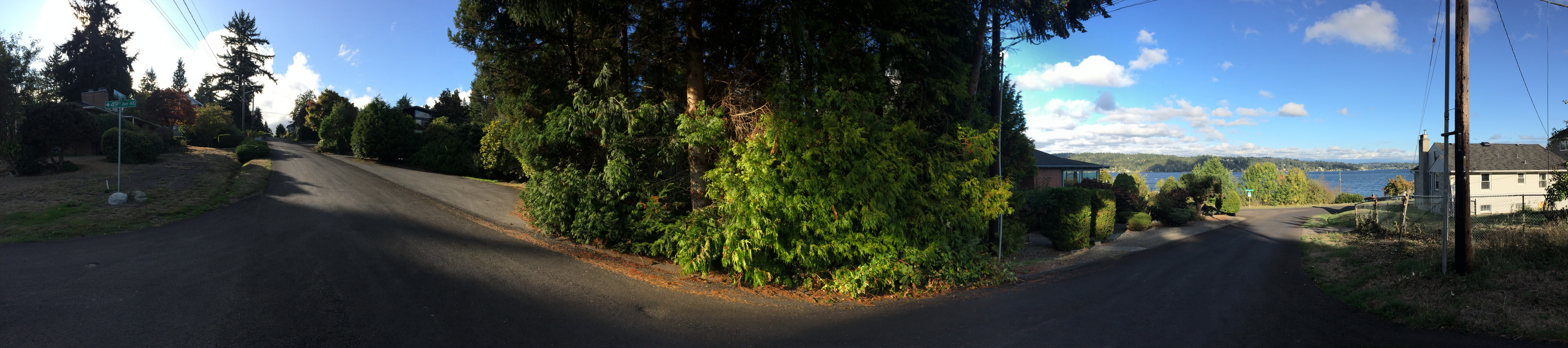
Residential area with a view of Lake Washington

== See also ==
- Thornton Creek
- Meadowbrook neighborhood
- Northgate district
