= Meadowbrook, Seattle =

- Seattle Neighborhood
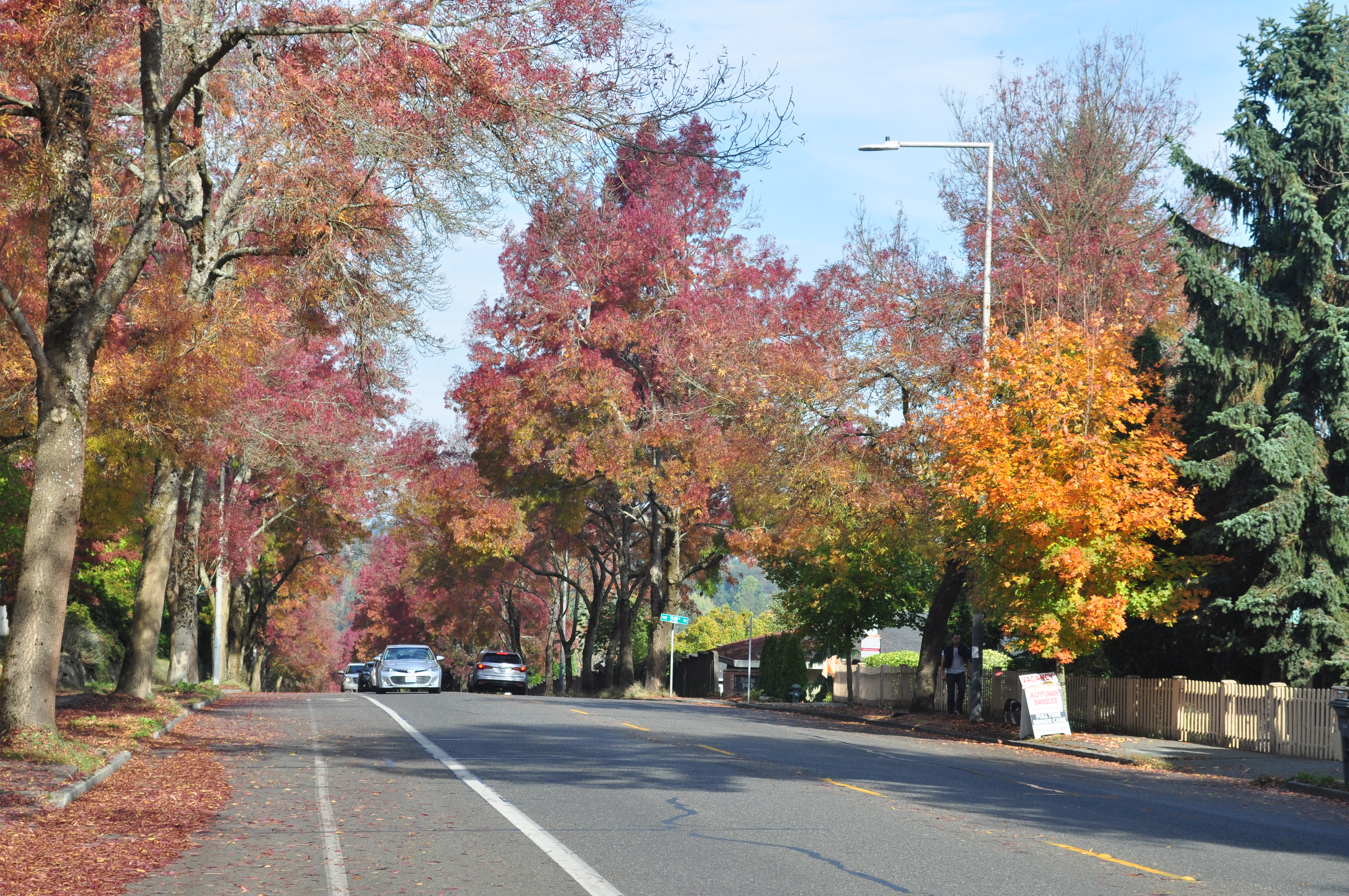
- NE 35th Street in Meadowbrook is one of the few Seattle streets dominated by deciduous trees that change color in the autumn.

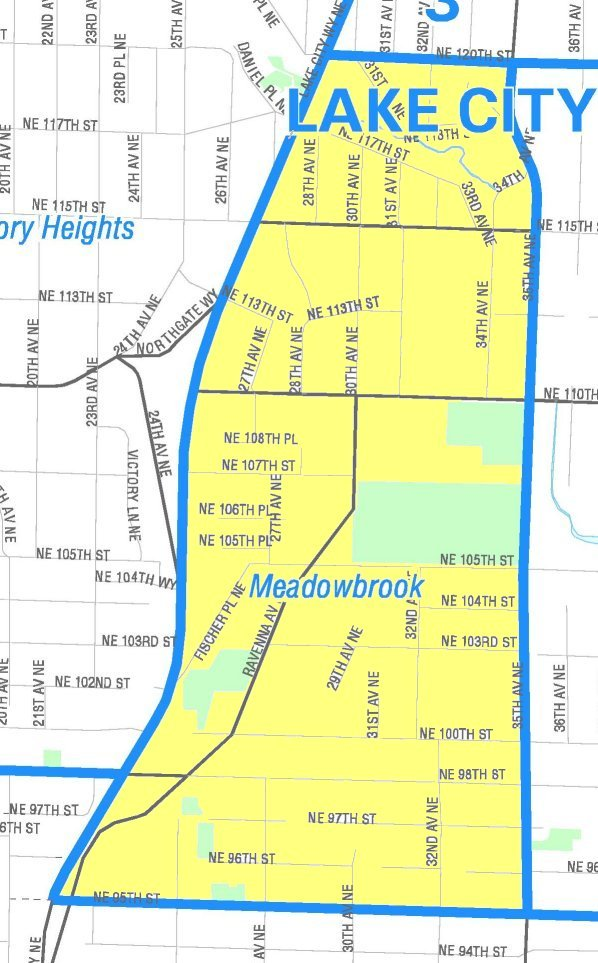
- Meadowbrook Highlighted in Yellow
- Coordinates: 47°42′23″N 122°17′40″W
- Country: United States
- State: Washington
- County: King
- City: Seattle
- ZIP Code: 98125
- Area code: 206, 564

Meadowbrook is a neighborhood in the Lake City district (township annexed in 1954) of Seattle, Washington. Meadowbrook is centered on open fields adjacent to the Community Center, Meadowbrook swimming pool, and Nathan Hale High School. It is bounded on the south by NE 95th Street and the Wedgwood neighborhood, on the north by NE 120th Street and Cedar Park, on the west by Lake City Way NE (State Route 522) and Victory Heights, and on the east by 35th Avenue NE and Matthews Beach.

The neighborhood is almost entirely residential. There are no commercial strips, though there are some small restaurants and other businesses. The area is served by a number of public schools, including John Rogers Elementary, Jane Addams Middle School, and Nathan Hale High School. The site where Nathan Hale High School now sits was formerly Meadowbrook Golf Course.

== History ==
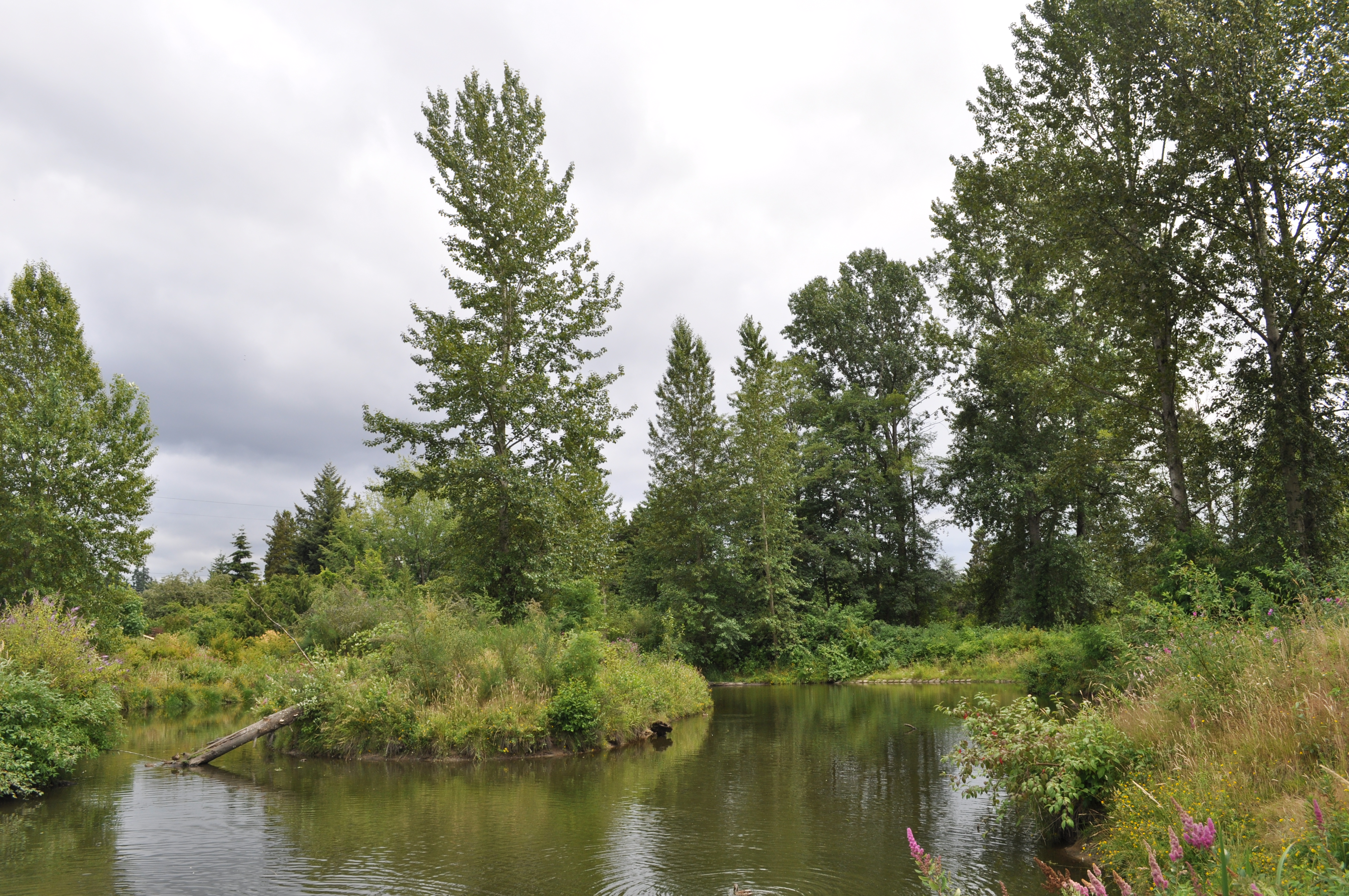
Meadowbrook Pond, July 2009

Meadowbrook, with Thornton Creek near Lake Washington, has been inhabited since the end of the last glacial period (c. 8,000 BCE—10,000 years ago). The tu-hoo-beed (Thornton Creek) hah-chu-ahbsh (Lake People) of the Duwamish (Dkhw’Duw’Absh, People of the Inside) Lushootseed (Skagit-Nisqually) Coast Salish native people lost their rights in 1854. The Lake City area was clearcut by crude wagon road or by using Lake Washington from 1850 through the start of the 20th century, more rapidly with the Seattle, Lake Shore and Eastern Railway (c. 1886) providing easy access along what is now the Burke–Gilman Trail through adjacent Matthews Beach neighborhood and along the lake. A Little Germany neighborhood of several immigrant farmers grew up in the 1870s around where Nathan Hale High School now stands.

The Blindheim family LaVilla Dairy, located on what is now the 10300 block of Fischer Place NE, and the orchards extending up the adjacent hill to the east are defining characteristics of Meadowbrook. The dairy operated from 1913 to 1929, although it was occupied until 1990. The dairy was also called La Villa. Both the dairy building and the family house still stand. Traces of the original Bothell-Everett highway can still be found nearby. The centerpiece of Meadowbrook is on land sold by the family to the City for the park (as well as for other green space).

== Thornton Creek in Meadowbrook ==
Thornton Creek, flowing through Meadowbrook, has been largely restored and daylighted, notably the confluence of the north and south forks near the Meadowbrook fields. The environmental restoration near the school and in the neighborhood is used for school class work in the sciences. The Community Center nearly faces the entry to restored Meadowbrook Pond and wetland across 35th Avenue in Matthews Beach neighborhood.

== See also ==
- Northgate, Seattle

== Bibliography ==
- "About the Seattle City Clerk's On-line Information Services". Information Services. Seattle City Clerk's Office. April 30, 2006.
  See heading, "Note about limitations of these data".
- Dailey, Tom (n.d.). "Duwamish-Seattle". Coast Salish Villages of Puget Sound.
  Page links to Village Descriptions Duwamish-Seattle section.
  Dailey referenced "Puget Sound Geography" by T. T. Waterman. Washington DC: National Anthropological Archives, mss. [n.d.] [ref. 2];
  Duwamish et al. vs. United States of America, F-275. Washington DC: US Court of Claims, 1927. [ref. 5];
  "Indian Lake Washington" by David Buerge in the Seattle Weekly, 1–7 August 1984 [ref. 8];
  "Seattle Before Seattle" by David Buerge in the Seattle Weekly, 17–23 December 1980. [ref. 9];
  The Puyallup-Nisqually by Marian W. Smith. New York: Columbia University Press, 1940. [ref. 10].
  Recommended start is "Coast Salish Villages of Puget Sound"
- Hayes, Peter (n.d.). "Case 5B - Milk From the Cow". Thornton Creek Watershed Community Library. Archived from the original on September 1, 2004.
- Hayes, Peter (n.d.). "Ole Blindheim". Thornton Creek Watershed Community Library. Archived from the original on September 20, 2004.
- Phelps, Myra L. (1978). Public works in Seattle. Seattle: Seattle Engineering Department. ISBN 0-9601928-1-6.
- "Meadowbrook". Seattle City Clerk's Neighborhood Map Atlas. Office of the Seattle City Clerk. n.d.
  Maps "NN-1030S", "NN-1040S".jpg dated 17 June 2002.
- Seattle Parks and Recreation staff (March 9, 2006). "Seattle Parks & Recreation: Meadowbrook Community Center". Seattle Parks and Recreation.
- Seattle Parks and Recreation staff (September 20, 2004). "Seattle Parks and Recreation: Meadowbrook Playfield". Seattle Parks and Recreation.
- Seattle Parks and Recreation staff (March 14, 2006). "Seattle Parks and Recreation: Meadowbrook Pool". Seattle Parks and Recreation.
- Seattle Public Utilities staff (2006). "Meadowbrook Pond". Title of Complete Work. Seattle Parks and Recreation. Archived from the original on February 17, 2006.
- Seattle Schools staff (n.d.). "Nathan Hale High School". Title of Complete Work. Seattle Parks and Recreation.
- Shenk, Carol; Pollack, Laurie; Dornfeld, Ernie; Frantilla, Anne; Neman, Chris (June 26, 2002). "About neighborhood maps". Seattle City Clerk's Office Neighborhood Map Atlas. Information Services, Seattle City Clerk's Office.
  Sources for this atlas and the neighborhood names used in it include a 1980 neighborhood map produced by the Department of Community Development (relocated to the Department of Neighborhoods and other agencies), Seattle Public Library indexes, a 1984-1986 Neighborhood Profiles feature series in the Seattle Post-Intelligencer, numerous parks, land use and transportation planning studies, and records in the Seattle Municipal Archives.
  [Maps "NN-1120S", "NN-1130S", "NN-1140S".Jpg [sic] dated 13 June 2002; "NN-1030S", "NN-1040S".jpg dated 17 June 2002.]
- Wilma, David (July 18, 2001). "Seattle Neighborhoods: Lake City -- Thumbnail History". HistoryLink.org Essay 3449. HistoryLink On-line Encyclopedia of Washington State History.
  See also Bibliography at Lake City for complete list Wilma referenced.
- Walter, Sunny; local Audubon chapters (February 10, 2006). "Sunny Walter's Washington Nature Weekends: Wildlife Viewing Locations - Greater Seattle Area". Archived from the original on March 22, 2005.
  "with additions by Sunny Walter and local Audubon chapters."
  Viewing locations only; the book has walks, hikes, wildlife, and natural wonders.
  Walter excerpted from
  - Dolan, Maria; True, Kathryn (2003). Nature in the city: Seattle. Seattle: Mountaineers Books. ISBN 0-89886-879-3.
    See "Northeast Seattle" section, bullet points "Meadowbrook", "Paramount Park Open Space", "North Seattle Community College Wetlands", and "Sunny Walter -- Twin Ponds".
- "LaVilla Dairy and Blindheim House". Thornton Creek Heritage Sites. Thornton Creek Watershed Community Library. n.d. Archived from the original on August 29, 2004.
