= Daniel Gilman =

Daniel Gilman may refer to:

- Daniel Coit Gilman (1831–1908), American educator and academician
- Daniel Hunt Gilman (1845–1913), railroad builder
