= Maple Leaf, Seattle =

- Seattle Neighborhood
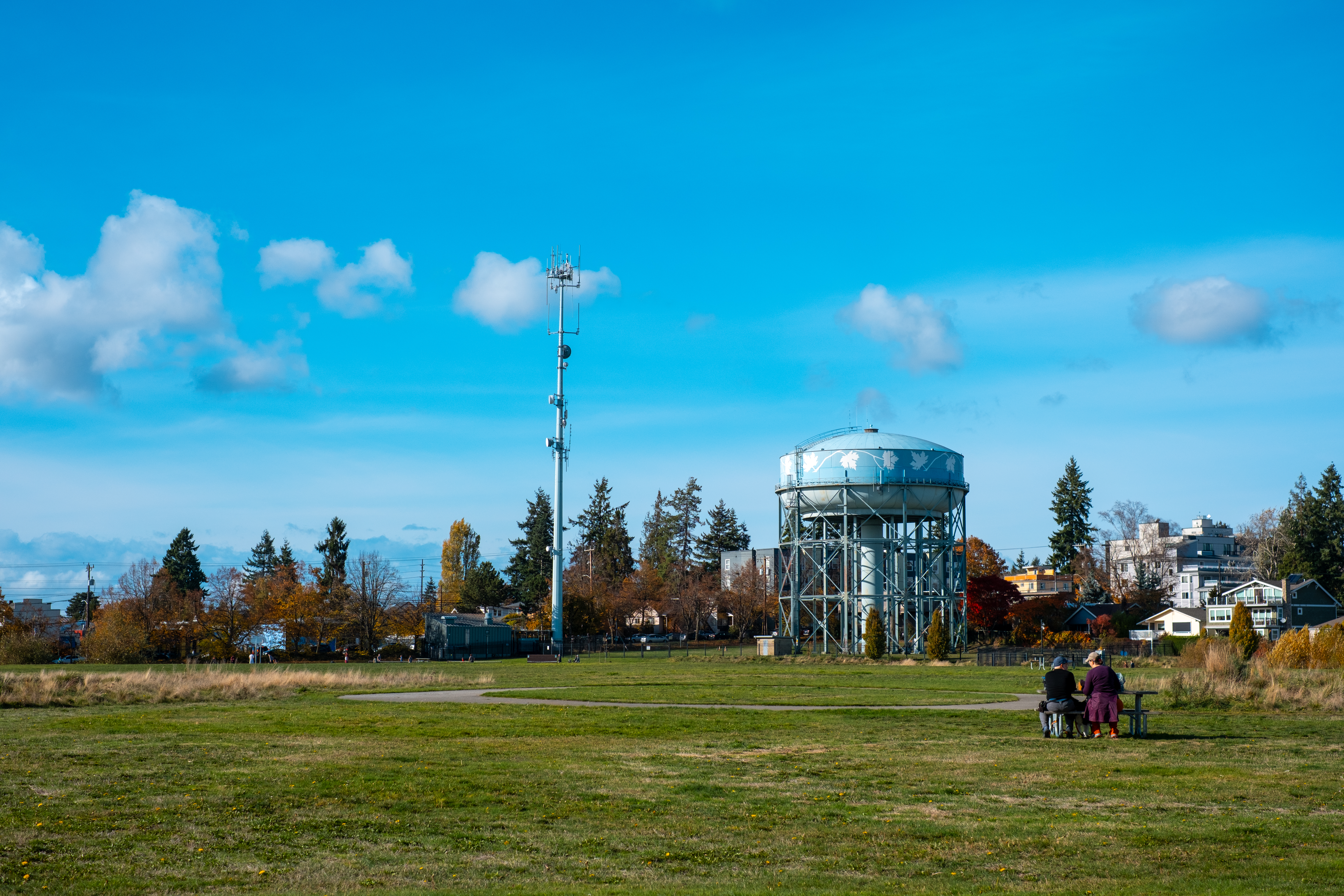
- Maple Leaf Park

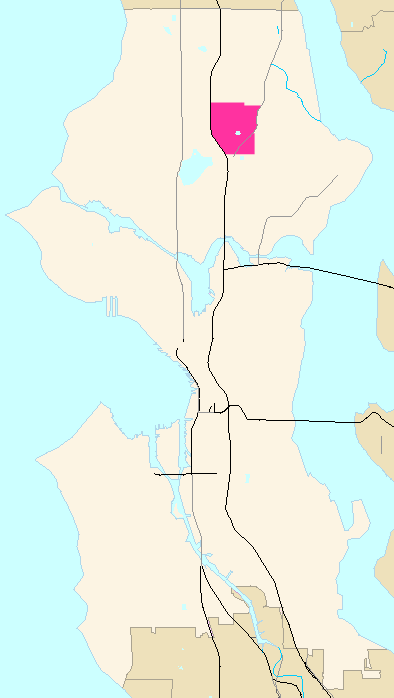
- Coordinates: 47°41′44″N 122°19′03″W
- Country: United States
- State: Washington
- County: King
- City: Seattle
- ZIP Code: 98115
- Area code(s): 206, 564

Maple Leaf is a mostly residential neighborhood located in northeast Seattle.

== History ==
The area that is now the Maple Leaf neighborhood appeared on maps in 1894 as a plat by real estate promoters and was called the Maple Leaf Addition to the Green Lake Tract. The name may have come from the Maple Saw Mill that operated to the east on Lake Washington or from some maple trees that once grew in the area. There is also an apocryphal story that Maple Leaf was so far north of downtown Seattle that it got its name for being near Canada.

The neighborhood established itself through the early 1900s, gaining a school district in 1907 and the Maple Leaf Reservoir in 1912. The neighborhood's earliest residents were Japanese American farmers. These included immigrants like Denjiro and Jin Nishitani, who established a nursery and garden and raised their family in the neighborhood. The U.S. interned the Nishitani family during World War II, but the property remained in the family until they sold it for redevelopment in 1973.

During the early 1900s, Maple Leaf and many other Seattle neighborhoods began to use racial restrictive covenants to block people of color from buying property or living there unless they were "servants domesticated with an owner or tenant". Many developers began instating these covenants after the U.S. Supreme Court ruled against the use of city ordinances in enforcing residential segregation in 1917. Two documented covenants in Maple Leaf covered at least 50 properties.

In 1924, William Earl Waldo created the Waldo Sanitarium next to the Maple Leaf Reservoir. It was founded as a place for osteopathic medicine, which had been legalized in Washington in 1909, but still not permitted in any Seattle hospitals. The sanitarium expanded throughout the 1900s, creating intern training programs and becoming a nonprofit as the Waldo General Hospital. The organization moved closer to Northgate in the 1960s, and closed in 1985.

During the 1940s, a 100-foot tall water tower was constructed in the neighborhood. It wasn't until after World War II that the entirety of Maple Leaf neighborhood was within the Seattle city limits. Prior to 1954 the city line was located at 85th Street, but after a series of annexations took place the city limits moved to its current location of 145th Street.

Maple Leaf was affected by nearby redevelopment through the next decades, with Northgate Mall's construction in 1950 and I-5 being built into the hill's edge in the 1960s. Puni Hokea and Peter Orser created the Maple Leaf Community Council in 1983, successfully campaigning against upzoning along Roosevelt Way NE.

=== Neighborhood of the Year ===
In 1986 Maple Leaf was given the title of national "Neighborhood of the Year" by Neighborhoods USA. Seattle Mayor Charles Royer nominated Maple Leaf for the award.

== Boundaries and geography ==
Although Seattle neighborhood boundaries are unofficial, Maple Leaf lies between Interstate 5 in the west and State Route 522 (also known as Lake City Way) in the east. The neighborhood goes as far north as Northgate Way and as far south as NE 75th Street.

Bordering neighborhoods include Roosevelt neighborhood to the south; Pinehurst and Victory Heights neighborhoods of the Northgate district to the north; Lake City and Wedgwood neighborhoods to the east; North College Park or Licton Springs neighborhood to the west.

The highest point in Maple Leaf, located on 92nd Street and Roosevelt Way, is 466 feet above sea level, making it the third highest point of elevation in Seattle.

Distinctive features of the neighborhood include the water tower and reservoir located at 85th and Roosevelt, plus historic Waldo Hospital at 85th NE and NE 15th, which has since been replaced by an Aegis Living senior housing complex. The water tower is painted with a distinctive coupling of maple leaves viewable from Interstate 5.

=== Park and reservoir ===
The Maple Leaf reservoir was completed in 1910 with the purpose of creating a reservoir for residential and commercial water use. In 2009 the Seattle city government began plans to move the reservoir underground. This was part of a citywide plan to replace all open reservoirs with underground structures in order to improve the quality and security of the water supply and provide new public open spaces on reservoir lids throughout Seattle. In 2013 the 16-acre park was completed.

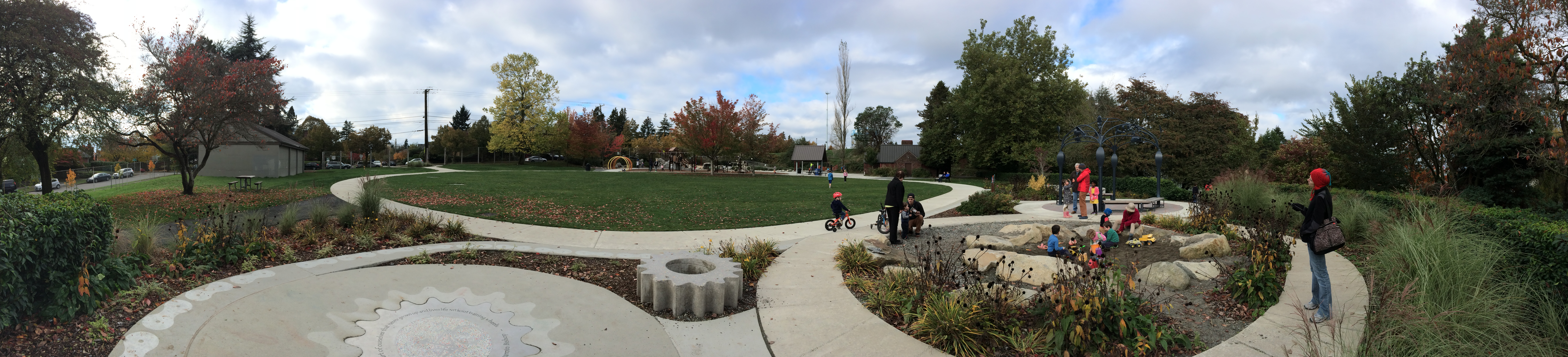
Maple Leaf Playground, near the water tower and the covered Maple Leaf Reservoir that serve as the main recreation area in the neighborhood

== Schools and library ==
=== Schools ===
There are two public elementary schools in Maple Leaf which are part of the citywide Seattle Public Schools district.

- Olympic View Elementary School is a 20-room, 2-story brick building located on the 500 block of 95th Street. Founded in 1903 as the East Oak Lake School, Olympic View is one of the oldest schools in the city. The current building was constructed in 1989.
- Sacajawea Elementary School opened in 1955 with nine portable buildings. The current building was completed in 1959 and is located on the 9500 block of 20th Avenue. The school was named after Sacagawea, a Shoshone Indian woman who helped to guide the Lewis and Clark Expedition.

Along with the two public elementary schools Maple Leaf is home to a handful of private schools.

- The Fairview School: A K-8th grade school affiliated with the Church of God. The building was built in 1908 and housed a public elementary school for 70 years. After the school closed the site was put up for bid, with the neighborhood fiercely opposing a plan to convert the school to low-income housing units. Originally the site was sold to the Pacific Northwest Ballet but after that deal fell through the Woodland Park Avenue Church purchased the building.
- St. Catherine School: A Catholic school serving students ranging from K-8th grade. The school was founded in 1941 and was staffed by the Sisters of Providence for 35 years.
- The Perkins School: A K-5th grade school located on the 9000 block of Roosevelt Way.

==== The Maple Leaf School ====
Although it would be considered outside of the current Maple Leaf neighborhood's boundaries, the Maple Leaf School opened in 1896 near Lake Washington.

=== Library ===
The Northgate Library, which is a branch of the Seattle Public Library system, is located on 10500 block of 5th Avenue, across from Northgate Mall. The library and the adjacent community center and park opened in July 2006.
