= Laketon =

Laketon may refer to:

== Canada ==
- Laketon, British Columbia
- Laketon, New Brunswick

== United States ==
- Laketon, Indiana
- Laketon, Luce County, Michigan
- A former name of the post office for Bridgman, Michigan
- Laketon Township, Michigan
- Laketon, a township of Brookings County, South Dakota

== See also ==
- Laketown (disambiguation)
- Lake Town (disambiguation)
