= Town Lake (disambiguation) =

Town Lake is a colloquial name for Lady Bird Lake, a reservoir in Austin, Texas.

Town Lake or Towne Lake may also refer to:

- Town Lake, Alberta, Canada
- Towne Lake, Georgia, US

== See also ==
- Lake Town (disambiguation)
