= Thomas Burke (railroad builder) =

American lawyer

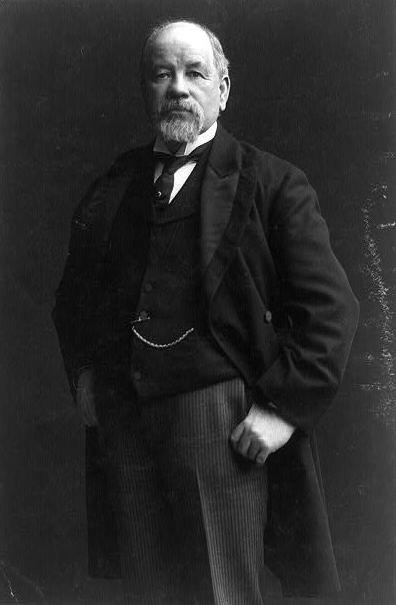
- Thomas Burke
- Born: December 22, 1849
- Died: December 4, 1925 (aged 75)
- Burial place: Evergreen Washelli Memorial Park
- Occupations: American lawyer, railroad builder, and judge

Thomas Burke (December 22, 1849 – December 4, 1925) was an American lawyer, railroad builder, and judge who made his career in Seattle, Washington. He served as chief justice of the Supreme Court of the Washington Territory from 1888 to 1889. He was the main representative of railroad magnate James J. Hill in Seattle. Burke Avenue, The Burke-Gilman Trail and the Burke Museum are named in his honor.

Burke frequently organized subscription drives to raise money for Seattle projects, to the point that he often described himself as a "professional beggar." His would often be the first name on the petition, pledging the first dollar—or, later, the first thousand dollars.

== Early career ==
Burke arrived in Seattle in 1875 and formed a law partnership with John J. McGilvra; he soon married McGilvra's daughter Caroline. He established himself as a civic activist: one of his first projects was to raise funds for a planked walkway from roughly the corner of First and Pike (now site of Pike Place Market) through Belltown to Lake Union.

He served as probate judge 1876-1880 and as chief justice of the Washington Territorial Supreme Court in 1888.

"Irish as a clay pipe," and well liked by early Seattle's largely Irish working class, as a lawyer Burke was well known for collecting large fees from his wealthy clients and providing free legal services for the poor. Therefore, many were surprised when he opposed the working-class anti-Chinese agitation in 1885–86, allying instead with George Kinnear and his Home Guard in providing armed defense for the Chinese against vigilantism. In this, he was a defender not so much of the Chinese themselves as of the rule of law. When one of the anti-Chinese rioters died of a gunshot incurred during the violence of February 7, 1886, Burke was among those charged with shooting with intent to kill; none were ever actually brought to trial.

== Railwayman ==
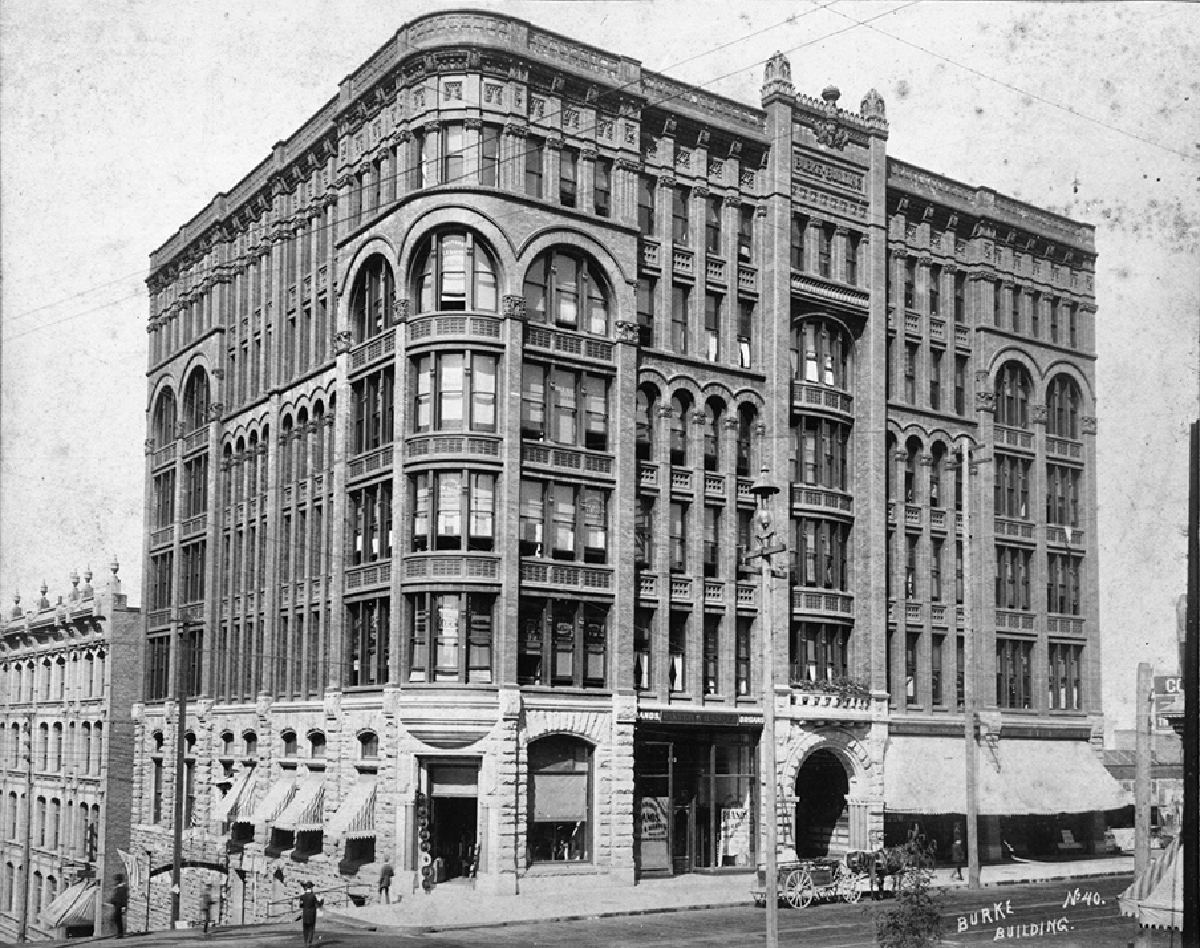
The Burke Building, downtown Seattle, built 1890, photographed 1900. On the site of today's Henry M. Jackson Federal Building.

Two years before Burke's arrival in Seattle, the Northern Pacific Railway had chosen nearby Tacoma as its western terminus. Many thought that this would condemn Seattle to, at best, a secondary role on Puget Sound. Burke would rise to prominence as a leader in Seattle's effort to avoid that fate.

Seattle's first attempt to build its way into the national rail network—the Seattle and Walla Walla Railroad—never got out of King County, although it did make a decent profit for its investors when Henry Villard bought it out in 1883 during his brief tenure at the head of Northern Pacific. However, Villard's successors operate the line intermittently at best, leaving the city little benefit from its support for the venture.

Burke raised money to send Daniel Hunt Gilman back east to seek investment for another railroad, the Seattle, Lake Shore and Eastern Railway (SLS&E). (Others involved in the founding of the railroad included David Denny, Thomas T. Minor, and George Kinnear.) In the event, Burke ended up accompanying Gilman on the trip. It became clear that any eastern investment would be dependent upon at least 10% of the investment coming from Seattle-area locals. The investment was found, and Burke became a railway attorney.

The building of the SLS&E was a combination of hard-headed business and frontier disregard for law. On at least one occasion, Burke convinced the Snohomish County sheriff to head off to the wilderness with all of his deputies to prevent a representative of a rival railway scheme from serving a writ that would have prevented the construction of a bridge across the Snohomish River. Exploits like this helped to bring him to the attention of James J. Hill of the Great Northern Railway.

Along with Judge Cornelius H. Hanford, Burke convinced the Seattle City Council to establish the 120-foot (37 m) Railroad Avenue (now Alaskan Way) along the downtown waterfront. The SLS&E got first choice of a right-of-way.

The Northern Pacific eventually gained control of SLS&E by purchasing a majority of its stock. By this time, Seattle had established itself well enough as a city that Northern Pacific chose actually to operate the line (though the city did not get a major passenger terminal until 1905).

Burke was a partner with Bostonian Frank Osgood and Seattle pioneer David Denny in the city's first horse-drawn streetcars (1884); only five years later, the three built one of the country's first electric streetcar lines.

James J. Hill hired Burke in 1890 as the local counsel for the Great Northern, virtually guaranteeing Seattle's role as that line's western terminus. However, city engineer Reginald H. Thomson opposed adding yet another railroad to the crowded waterfront. When the Great Northern ran its first train to Seattle June 20, 1893, the end of the line was at Smith Cove in Interbay, a bit north of downtown. Eventually, Hill, Burke, and the city engineer's office reached a mutually satisfactory solution to the problem: the Great Northern Tunnel, a railway tunnel under downtown Seattle, built 1903–1906.

== Death ==
Burke died on December 4, 1925. He is buried at the Burke family monument at Evergreen Washelli Memorial Park.

The Roseburg News-Review said:

He died of apoplexy while speaking at a meeting of the Carnegie Endowment for international peace to which he had come from his home in Seattle. The meeting was attended by Robert Lansing, former secretary of state, Elihu Root, President Nicholas Murray Butler of Columbia University and others of prominence. Judge Burke was making an appeal for justice in behalf of the Japanese empire when he suddenly collapsed and fell into the arms of Dr. Butler. He died before medical aid could be summoned. Dr. Butler, who was presiding, adjourned the meeting immediately and went to the Roosevelt hotel to notify Mrs. Burke of her husband's death. Escorted by Dr. Butler's secretary she returned to Seattle immediately. Judge Burke’s body followed as soon as preparations were made.

== See also ==
- Burke-Gilman Trail
