= Lake Town =

Lake Town may refer to:

- Lake Town, Kolkata, India
- Lake Town Township, Barnes County, North Dakota, United States
- Lake-town (Esgaroth), a town in The Hobbit by J. R. R. Tolkien

== See also ==
- Lake (disambiguation)
- Lake City (disambiguation)
- Lake Township (disambiguation)
- Laketon (disambiguation)
- Laketown (disambiguation)
- Town Lake (disambiguation)
