= Laketown =

Laketown may refer to:

== United States ==
- Laketown, Illinois
- Laketown, Utah
- Laketown, Wisconsin
- Laketown Township, Minnesota
- Laketown Township, Michigan

== Fiction ==
- Laketown (Middle-earth), from J. R. R. Tolkien's The Hobbit

== See also ==
- Laketon (disambiguation)
- Lake Town (disambiguation)
