= Lake City, California =

Lake City, California may refer to:

- Lake City, Modoc County, California
- Lake City, Nevada County, California
- Burnt Ranch, California, in Klamath County; previously known as "Lake City"
