= City of Lakes =

City of Lakes is a nickname for several places. It may refer to:

== Places ==
=== Asia ===
- Bathinda, Punjab, India (thermal lakes)
- Bengaluru, Karnataka, India
- Bhopal, Madhya Pradesh, India
- Chuncheon, South Korea
- Hanoi, Vietnam
- Hyderabad, Telangana, India
- Nainital, Uttarakhand, India
- Pokhara, Nepal
- Srinagar, Jammu and Kashmir, India
- Thane, Maharashtra, India
- Udaipur, Rajasthan, India
- Udaipur, Tripura, India

=== North America ===
- Dartmouth, Nova Scotia, Canada
- Greater Sudbury, Ontario, Canada
- Minneapolis, Minnesota, United States
- Lake Mary, Florida, United States

== Music ==
- "City of Lakes", a song on the album Matt Mays
- City of Lakes (album), an album by Irish ambient composer Seamus Ó Muíneacháin.
