= Lake City High School (South Carolina) =

Location
- 652 N. Matthews Road; Lake City, South Carolina 29560; United States
- 33.8710°N 79.7484°W

Information
- Type: Public school
- Established: 1970
- Principal: Ned Blake
- Grades: 9–12
- Enrollment: 552 (2023-2024)
- Colors: Blue and Gold
- Slogan: "Educating Students Who Are Equipped With The Tools Necessary To Achieve success"
- Team name: Panthers

Lake City High School is a secondary education institution located near Lake City, South Carolina. The school enrolls approximately 1,000 students.
