= Burke–Gilman Trail =

Rail trail in Seattle, US

Coordinates: 47°41′44″N 122°16′41″W

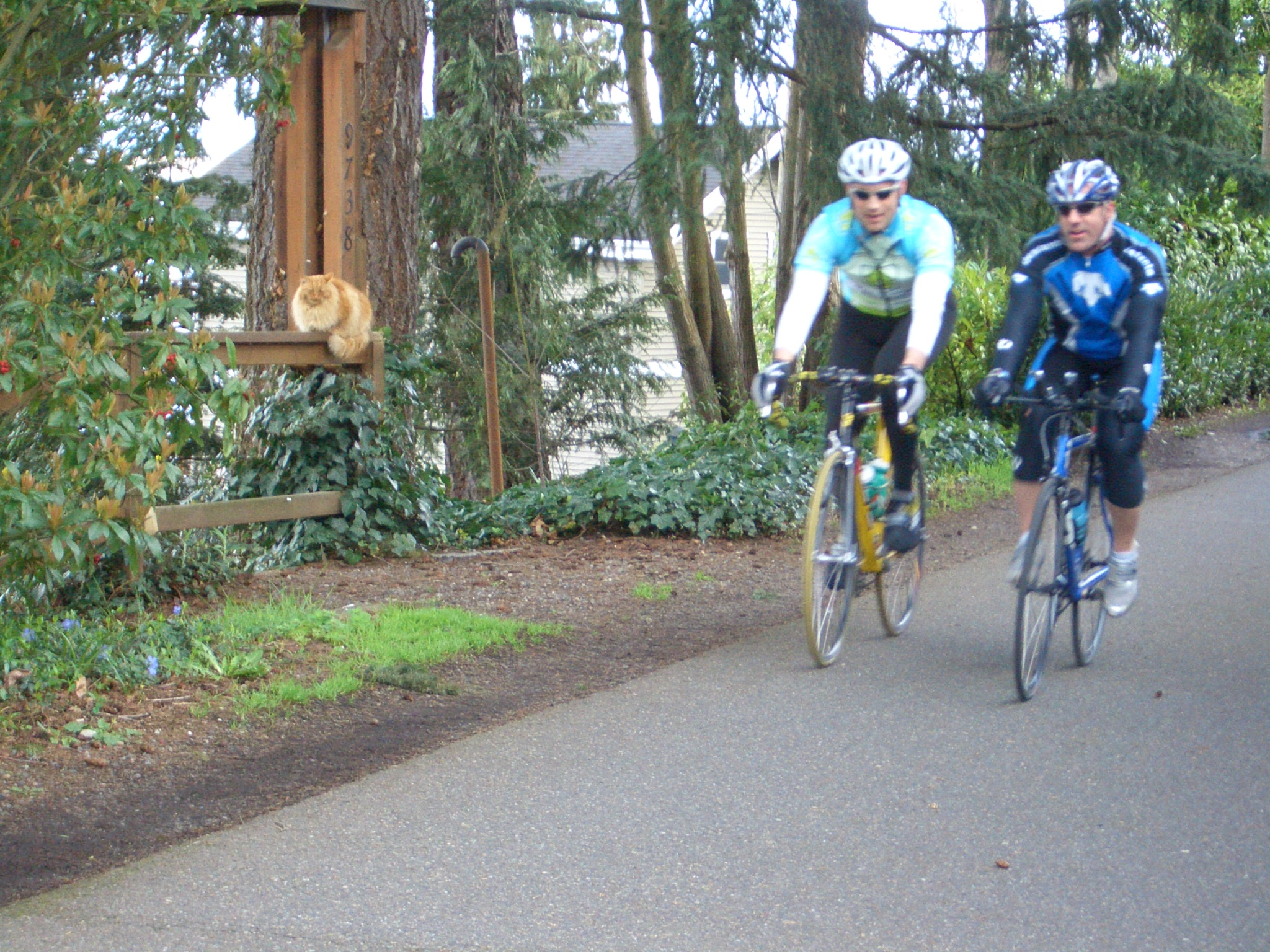
- A cat watches over Lake Washington and bicyclists on the Burke–Gilman Trail
- Length: 19.8 mi (31.9 km)
- Location: King County, Washington
- Established: August 19, 1978
- Use: Multi-use
- Grade: Flat

Trail map
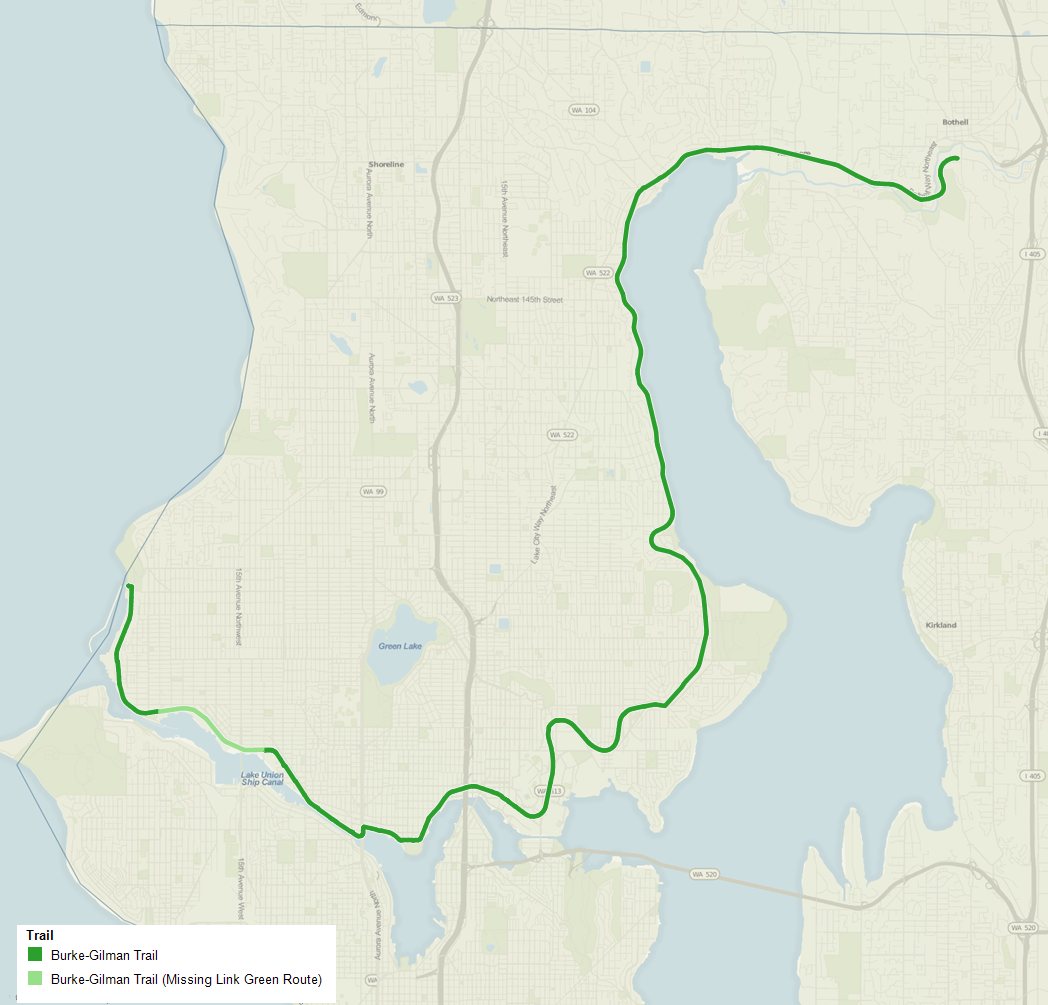
- Map of the Burke–Gilman Trail, including the proposed Green Route connection for the "missing link"

The Burke–Gilman Trail is a rail trail in King County, Washington. The 20-mile (32 km) multi-use recreational trail is part of the King County Regional Trail System and occupies an abandoned Seattle, Lake Shore and Eastern Railway (SLS&E) corridor.

A portion of the Burke–Gilman trail is managed by the City of Seattle. The trail begins at 11th Avenue NW in Ballard and follows along the Lake Washington Ship Canal and north along Lake Washington, designated as ending in Bothell.

== Route ==
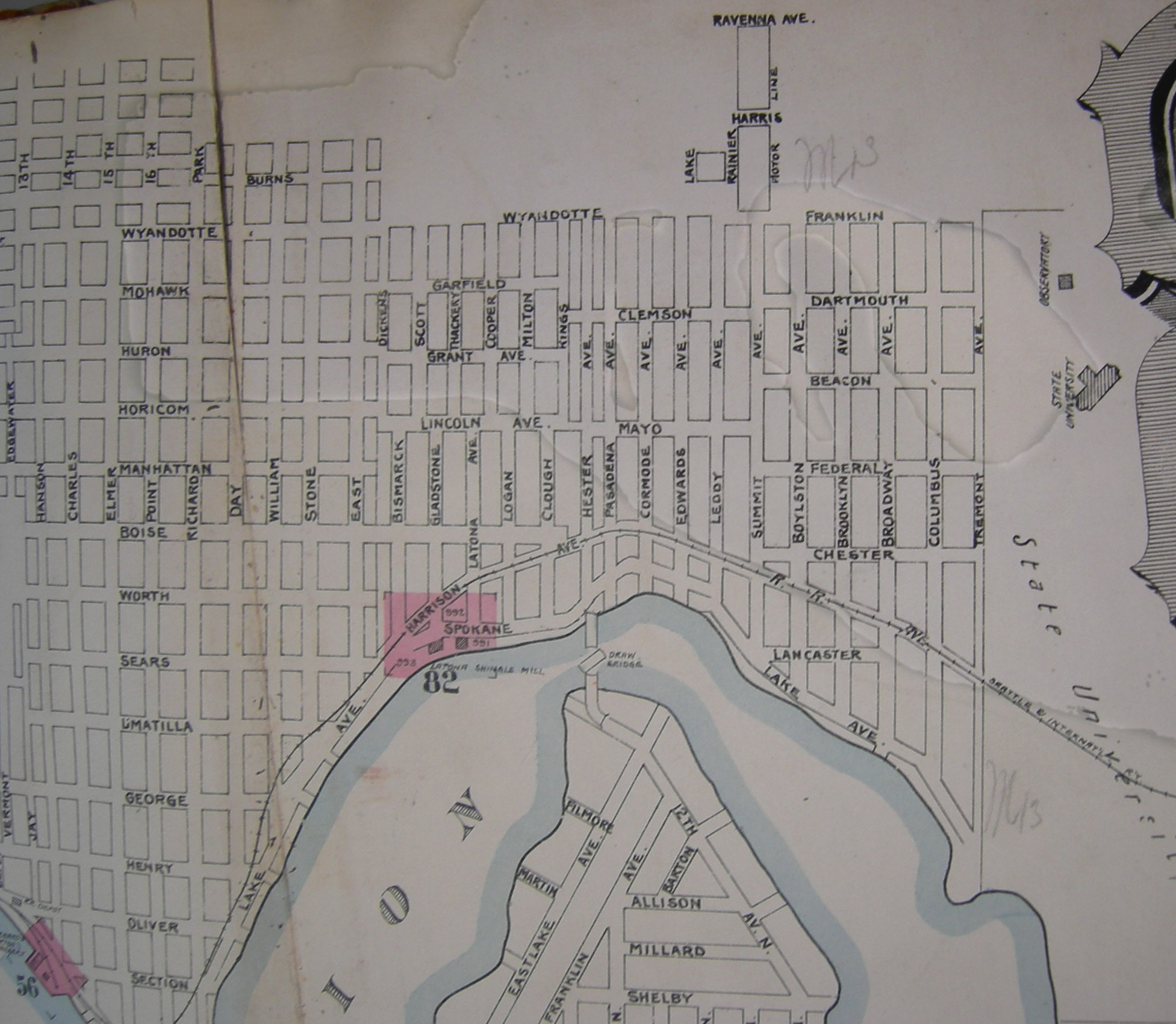
This 1893 map shows part of the rail route that later became the Burke–Gilman Trail.

The trail is a substantial part of the 90 miles (140 km) of signed bike routes in Seattle and the 175 miles (282 km) of trails in the King County Trails System. A segment of the Burke–Gilman portion, opened in July 2005, runs for 0.7 miles (1.1 km) from NW 60th Street and Seaview Avenue NW to the Ballard Locks. The main trail resumes at 11th Avenue NW and NW 45th Street and runs 17 miles (27 km) to Blyth Park in Bothell. There, it becomes the Sammamish River Trail segment, which parallels the Sammamish River for 10 miles (16 km) to Redmond.

The Burke–Gilman trail runs along the Fremont Cut, Lake Union (an old freight depot remains visible at the foot of Stone Way), and through the University of Washington campus. After passing the University Village shopping center, the trail heads up through northeast neighborhoods, alongside the Hawthorne Hills, Laurelhurst and Windermere neighborhoods; through the Sand Point neighborhood, passing Magnuson Park, then alongside Lake Washington from just before the Matthews Beach and Cedar Park neighborhoods of the former Lake City, continuing on through Lake Forest Park and Kenmore to Bothell. The trail throughout is nearly level with few large intersection crossings — it is a former railroad right-of-way.

The trail runs 14.1 miles (22.7 km) between Ballard and Tracy Owen Station in Kenmore (its initial eastern end), or 17 miles (27 km) to Blyth Park. The Seattle Parks Department considers the Burke–Gilman segment of the trail to end in Kenmore; while King County considers that the segments divide in Bothell. The total distance from Golden Gardens Park to Bothell, including the proposed "missing link" through Ballard, is 19.8 mi (31.9 km).

=== Sammamish River Trail ===
At Blyth Park in Bothell the trail becomes the Sammamish River Trail and continues for 10 miles (16 km) to Marymoor Park, Redmond, on Lake Sammamish. With the completion of a connector trail through Marymoor Park in May 2009 the trail network continues to the city of Issaquah via the East Lake Sammamish Trail for another 10 miles (16 km). The trail is over the Seattle, Lake Shore and Eastern Railway (SLS&E) line and in conjunction with Issaquah's Rainier Trail, Preston Trail, and the Preston Snoqualmie Trail.

The Snoqualmie Falls-North Bend link of SLS&E has become the line of the Northwest Railway Museum. The SLS&E terminated just beyond North Bend in Sallal Prairie. Users of the extensions can continue on the regional trail network at the Snoqualmie Valley Trail in North Bend and connect with the Iron Horse State Park at Rattlesnake Lake.

With the addition of the connector, the longest unbroken segment of the trail currently extends 42 miles.

=== Extensions ===
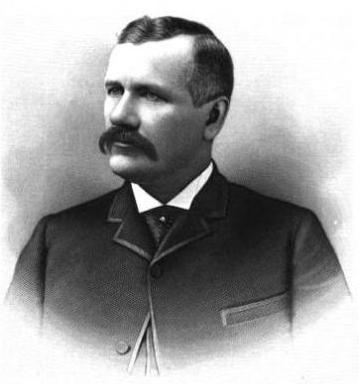
Daniel Hunt Gilman, Maine-born lawyer, railroad investor. Trail's namesake, along with judge Thomas Burke

As of 2006, there are extensions of the Burke–Gilman Trail at its western end: connecting the short and long segments between the Ballard Locks and 11th Avenue, and a northern extension along Shilshole Bay from NW 60th Street to Golden Gardens Park, and planning for connecting between the Ballard Locks and downtown Ballard at 11th Avenue NW and NW 45th Street.

A major point of contention since the 1990s regarding the remaining "missing link" project was the industrial nature of the Salmon Bay waterfront, through which this portion of the trail would pass. Local business owners voiced concerns about the safety and liability issues inherent in the convergence of Ballard Terminal Railroad trains, trucks, cyclists, and pedestrians. A Citizens group and the city claimed the dangers were being exaggerated. The trail overall can at times be busy and even crowded.

As of 2026, the original plan to construct the "missing link" along Shilshole Avenue NW remains paused due to decades of litigation. In response to these legal deadlocks, the city has shifted focus to an alternative alignment. The Seattle City Council has advanced a route that uses NW Market Street, Leary Avenue NW, and 17th Avenue NW. This route, which bypasses the industrial Shilshole corridor, was solidified by the passage of the Seattle Transportation Levy in November 2024. The levy, which passed with over 66% of the vote, explicitly included $20 million in funding to complete the design and construction of this new alignment.

Prior to this shift, a dangerous railroad crossing on the trail under the Ballard Bridge was the site of 39 crashes and incidents between 2015 and 2020. This crossing was removed and paved over in October 2023.

== History ==
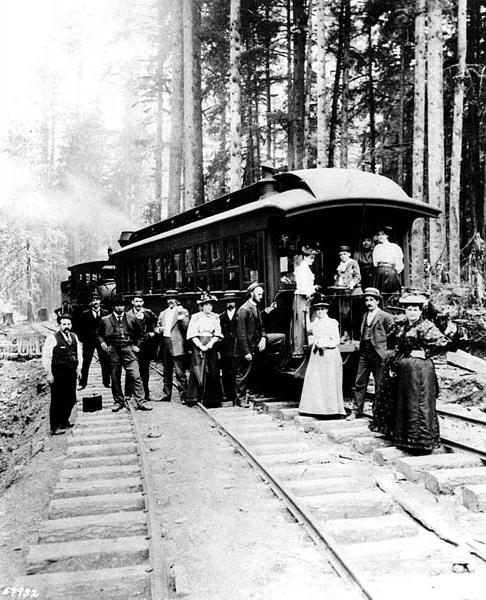
Opening Day Excursion on the Seattle Lake Shore and Eastern Railroad, site of the future Burke–Gilman Trail, c. 1887

The trail can trace its origins to the founding of the Seattle, Lake Shore and Eastern Railway on April 15, 1885, by ten men headed by judge Thomas Burke and Daniel Gilman. In its heyday, Burke and Gilman's road extended from Downtown Seattle north to Arlington and east to Rattlesnake Prairie above Snoqualmie Falls. Taken over by the Northern Pacific Railway around 1890, the line became part of the Burlington Northern Railroad in 1970, and was abandoned between 1971 and 1985.

On August 19, 1978 the first 12.1 miles (19.5 km) of the right-of-way from Seattle's Gas Works Park to Kenmore's Tracy Owen Station was opened as a public trail after seven years of advocacy and negotiations and named after the founders of the railroad. The trail was extended beyond Kenmore after abandonment in 1985. The current trail ends just short of the former Bothell Station site now the Northshore Health and Wellness Center.

A two-mile section of the trail within Lake Forest Park was temporarily closed for redevelopment from June 2011 to February 2012.

In November 2024, Seattle voters approved a transportation levy that secured $20 million to complete the "Missing Link" via the NW Market Street and Leary Avenue NW alignment, aiming to bypass the legal gridlock that stalled the Shilshole Avenue route for decades.

== Neighborhoods ==
The trail intersects the following:

- Seattle neighborhoods from western terminus east and north:
  - Ballard
  - Fremont
  - Northlake (also known as south Wallingford)
  - University District
  - Trail runs alongside:
    - University Village shopping center
    - Hawthorne Hills, Laurelhurst and Windermere neighborhoods
    - Sand Point neighborhood, passing Magnuson Park
  - Lake City district of neighborhoods
    - Matthews Beach
    - Cedar Park
- Suburban Seattle towns, continuing northeast:
  - Lake Forest Park
  - Kenmore
  - Bothell

== See also ==
- Seattle, Lake Shore & Eastern Railway
- Ravenna-Cowen Park and Ravenna Creek
- Eastside Rail Corridor

== Bibliography ==
- "Burke–Gilman Trail". Seattle Department of Transportation. Archived from the original on March 2, 2016.
- "Burke–Gilman Trail". King County Parks. King County.
- Speidel, William C. (1967). Sons of the profits; or, There's no business like grow business: the Seattle story, 1851-1901. Seattle: Nettle Creek Publishing Company. pp. 196–197, 200. ISBN 978-0-914890-00-3.
  Speidel provides a substantial bibliography with extensive primary sources.
