= Daniel Hunt Gilman =

American lawyer

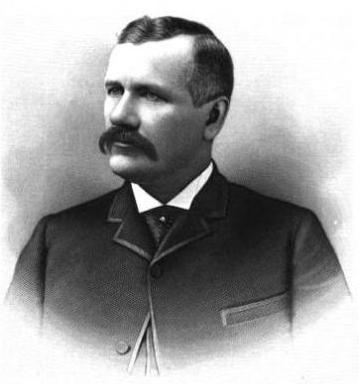
- Gilman, ca. 1890
- Born: February 8, 1845; Levant, Maine
- Died: April 27, 1913 (aged 68); Pasadena, California
- Occupation: railroad executive
- Known for: helped establish the Seattle, Lake Shore and Eastern Railway

Daniel Hunt Gilman (February 8, 1845 – April 27, 1913) was an American attorney and railroad builder who made his career in Seattle.

== Early life ==
Gilman was born in Levant, Maine, the son of Maine legislator Henry Gilman and his wife Mary (née Twombly) Gilman. Daniel Hunt Gilman received education at the town's high school and the East Main Conference Seminary in Bucksport.

At the age of 19 during the American Civil War, he enlisted in one of the Maine companies of the First District of Columbia Cavalry. He served as a sergeant with his regiment in General Kautz's division of cavalry, Army of the James, during the spring and summer of 1864. He was severely wounded at the Battle of Staunton River Bridge on June 25, 1864, but returned to duty four months later as a Quartermaster Sergeant in the First Maine Cavalry.

Gilman spent six years in New York City after the war. He worked in the city's mercantile houses and also engaged in real estate speculation before pursuing law. He received a degree from Columbia Law School in 1877 and entered private practice.

== Career in Seattle ==
SLS&E Engine No. 2 (also called the "D.H. Gilman")

In 1883, Gilman relocated to Seattle. He saw opportunity in untapped coal and iron deposits in the mountains outside of the city. He assisted in the establishment of the Seattle, Lake Shore and Eastern Railway (SLS&E) in 1885. The group of investors wanted to use a connection with a transcontinental line to trade the region's goods. With the help of approximately $500,000 from his contacts in New York, construction of the line began in 1887. Gilman was actively involved in the management and operation of the railroad until June 1887. He continued to retain interest in the enterprise afterward. The road eventually ran from downtown Seattle, around the northern shores of Lake Union, and to the east of Lake Washington. Portions between Ballard and Bothell became the recreational Burke-Gilman Trail about 100 years later. By 1889 the railroad reached as far as Snoqualmie Falls. Gilman was an early promoter of using the falls to generate hydroelectricity. Rail also stretched north from Seattle to Arlington. Track was laid in Spokane for a line heading west. However, the railroad never succeeded in crossing the Cascade Mountains as originally intended.

Along with the SLS&E, Gilman helped create the Seattle and Montana Railroad (part of the Great Northern system) and the West Street and North End Electric Railway in the city. He was also involved with various ventures connected with his railroad business. One of these was the establishment of the Seattle Coal and Iron Co. in the town of Squak. The SLS&E inevitably served the coal town. Squak was incorporated in 1892 as Gilman, and it later became the city of Issaquah.

Although he never sought public office, Gilman was chairman of the state Democratic party's central committee from 1890 to 1892. He helped to establish The Seattle Telegraph as the newspaper of the party.

On January 9, 1888, he married Grace C. Thorndyke. He returned to New York for some time but came back to Seattle in 1906. An injury sustained in an automobile accident on August 25, 1912, shortened his life. Gilman died in Pasadena, California, on April 27, 1913.
