= Cedar Park, Seattle =

Neighborhood in Seattle, Washington, United States

Coordinates: 47°43′28″N 122°17′15″W

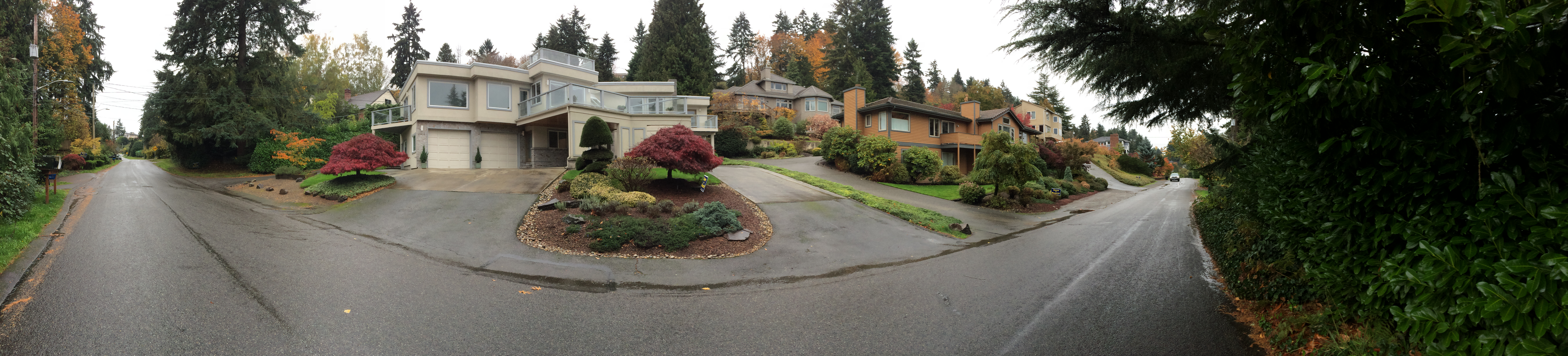
Cedar Park residential area near the short of Lake Washington

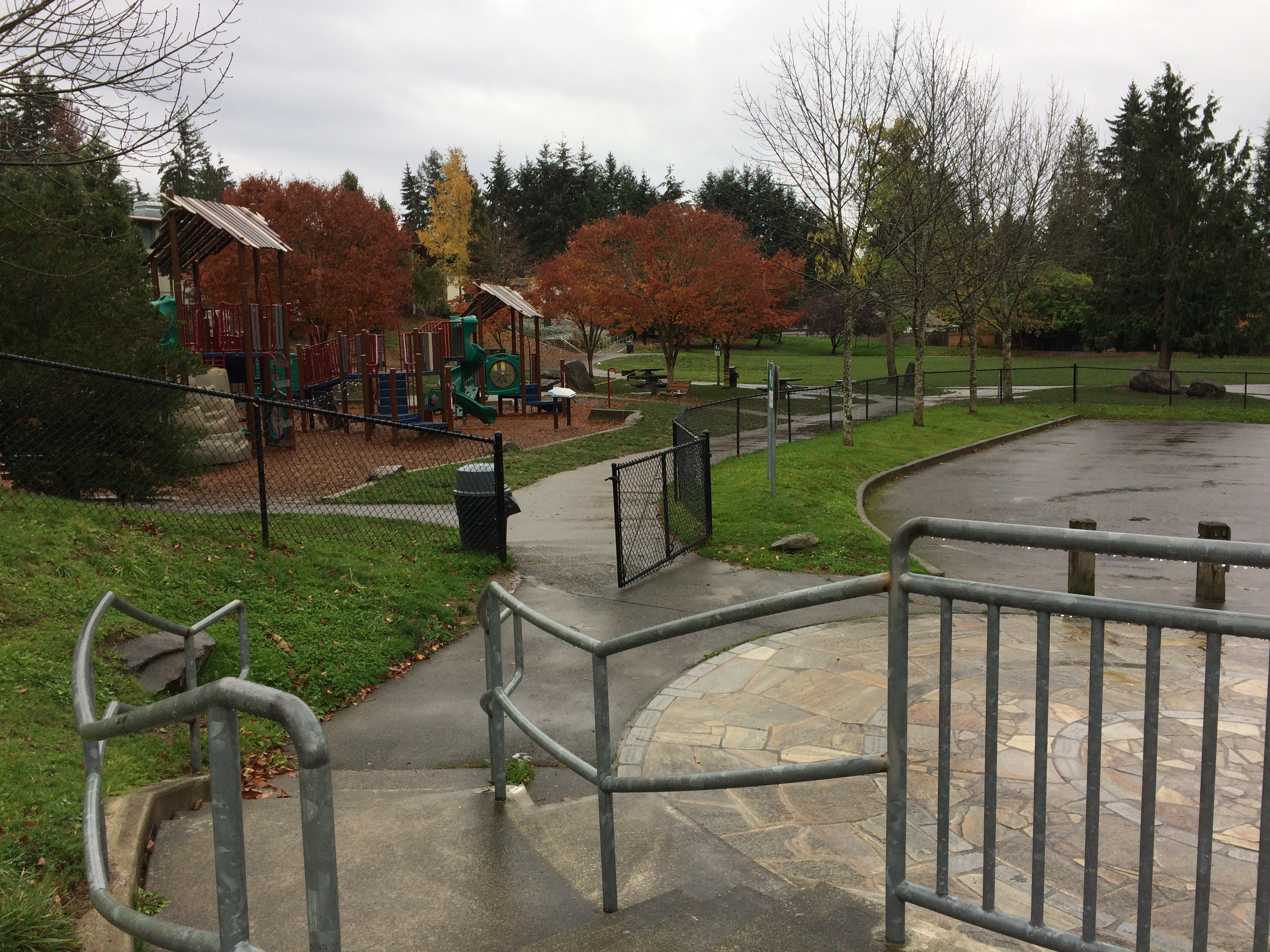
Cedar Park play area, the main public park in the neighborhood

Cedar Park is a neighborhood in the Lake City district of Seattle, Washington. The name generally refers to the residential neighborhoods east of Lake City adjoining Lake Washington.

The "Cedar Park" name comes from the plats that subdivided the land along Lake Washington that had previously belonged to the Puget Mill Company. Although the area was subdivided in the 1920s, development proceeded slowly. Many lots overlooking Lake Washington were occupied by vacation cottages from the 1920s to World War II. After 1945, the area developed as a single-family residential community. Many single-family residences in Cedar Park date from the 1950s, 1960s, and 1970s.

The neighborhood boundaries remain a matter of debate. Some believe that only the parcels platted with the name "Cedar Park" are properly part of the Cedar Park neighborhood. Others argue that the Cedar Park Neighborhood extends east from 35th Avenue NE to the shore of Lake Washington and extends from NE 145th Street at the north to NE 120th Street at the south. This larger area is the area represented by the Cedar Park Neighborhood Council.

This neighborhood was annexed to the City of Seattle in 1954 when the Seattle City Limits were extended north to 145th Street. From 1956 to 1981, children in the neighborhood attended the Cedar Park Elementary School, at NE 135th Street and 37th Avenue NE. In 1981, falling enrollment throughout the Seattle school system and particularly in the area served by the Cedar Park Elementary school led to the city deactivating the school. The city maintained title to the land and buildings, but ceased to use it as a school, and instead leased the space to an artists enclave known as the Artwood Studios, which stayed in residence for a full 32 years. In 2013, once again faced with changing enrollment numbers, the city reactivated the school. At the time of Artwood's displacement, the building had served longer as a home for the studio than it had seen service as a school. Despite Cedar Park Elementary's reopening, by default current elementary students go south to John Rogers Elementary School, middle school students attend Jane Addams Middle School and high school students go to Nathan Hale High School. Cedar Park Elementary was reopened as an Option school, leveraging a nontraditional curriculum approach based on expeditionary learning.

The former school playground, west of the former elementary school building, is now Cedar Park, a small local playground and play area.

The Burke-Gilman Trail cuts through Cedar Park from NE 145th Street to NE 120th Street paralleling the Lake Washington shoreline.
