= Lake City, Seattle =

- Seattle Neighborhood
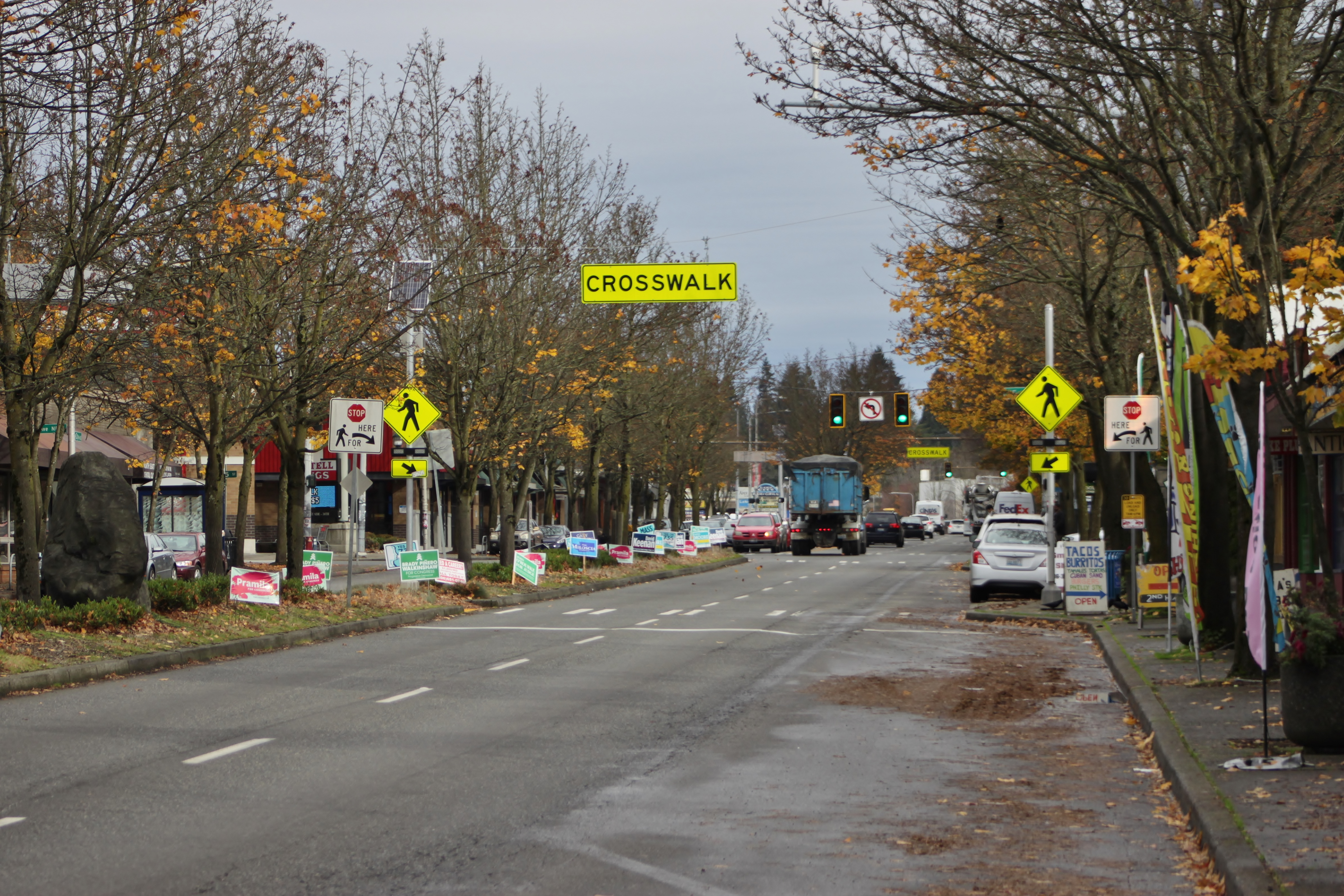
- Looking southbound on State Route 522 (Lake City Way) from NE 123rd Street.

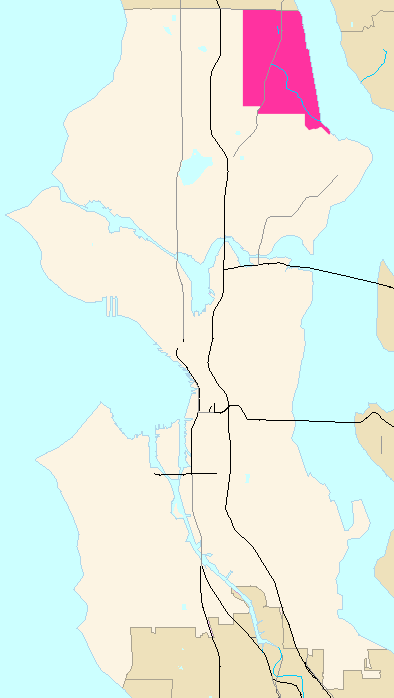
- Lake City Highlighted in Pink
- Coordinates: 47°43′12″N 122°17′42″W
- Country: United States
- State: Washington
- County: King
- City: Seattle
- ZIP Code: 98125
- Area code: 206, 564

Lake City is a neighborhood in the northeast region of Seattle, centered along Lake City Way NE (SR-522), 7–8 miles (11–13 km) northeast of downtown Seattle. A broader definition of the historical Lake City area includes all the land between 15th Avenue NE and Lake Washington, and between NE 95th and 98th streets to north of the Seattle city limits near Acacia Memorial Park at NE 149th Street. Lake City encompasses much of the Thornton Creek watershed, the focus of a long restoration campaign by citizens and Seattle Public Utilities staff to enhance the residential environment of Lake City.

== History ==
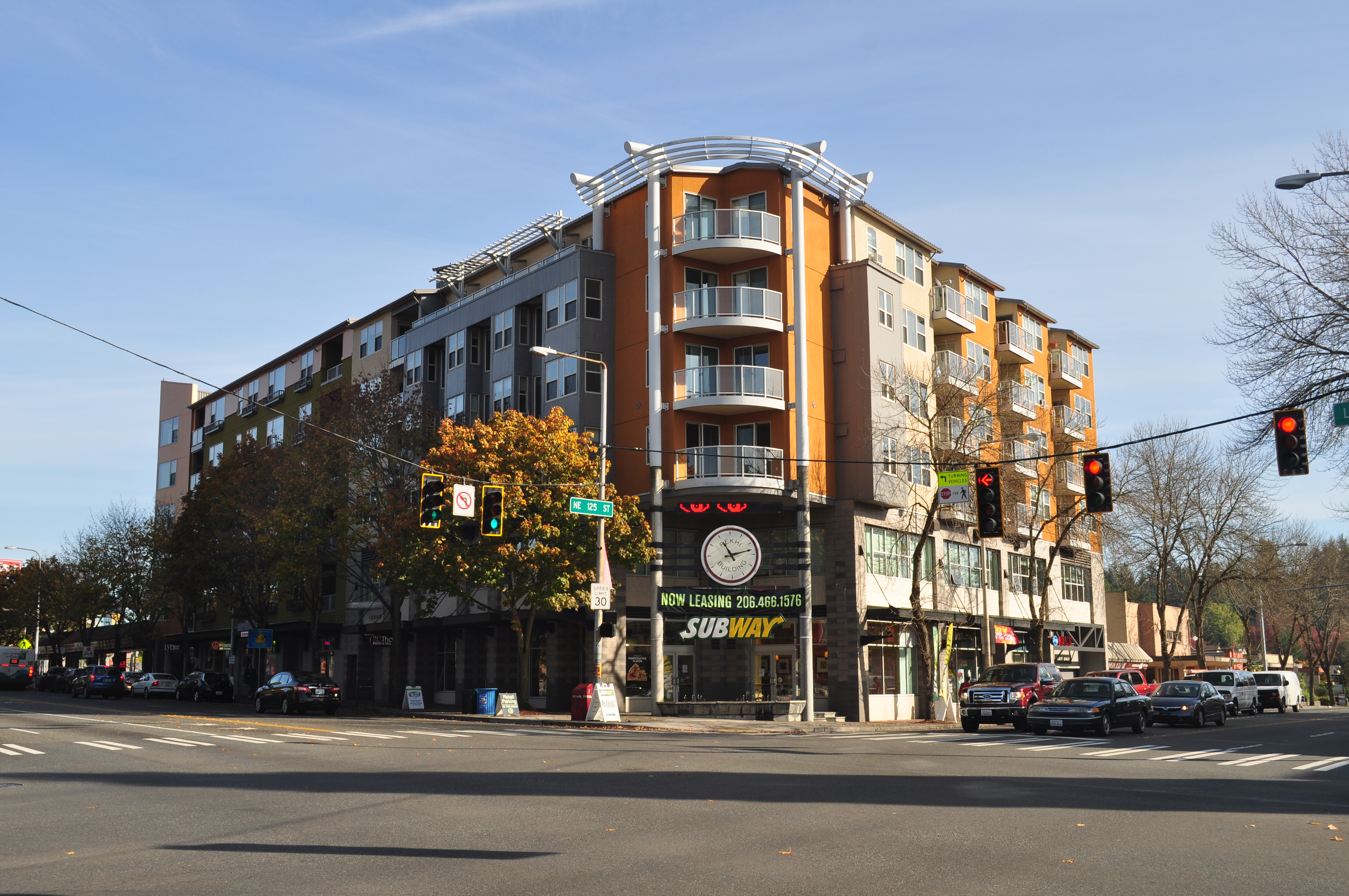
Rekhi Building on the northeast corner of Lake City Way NE and 125th Street NE, in the heart of Lake City, 2015.

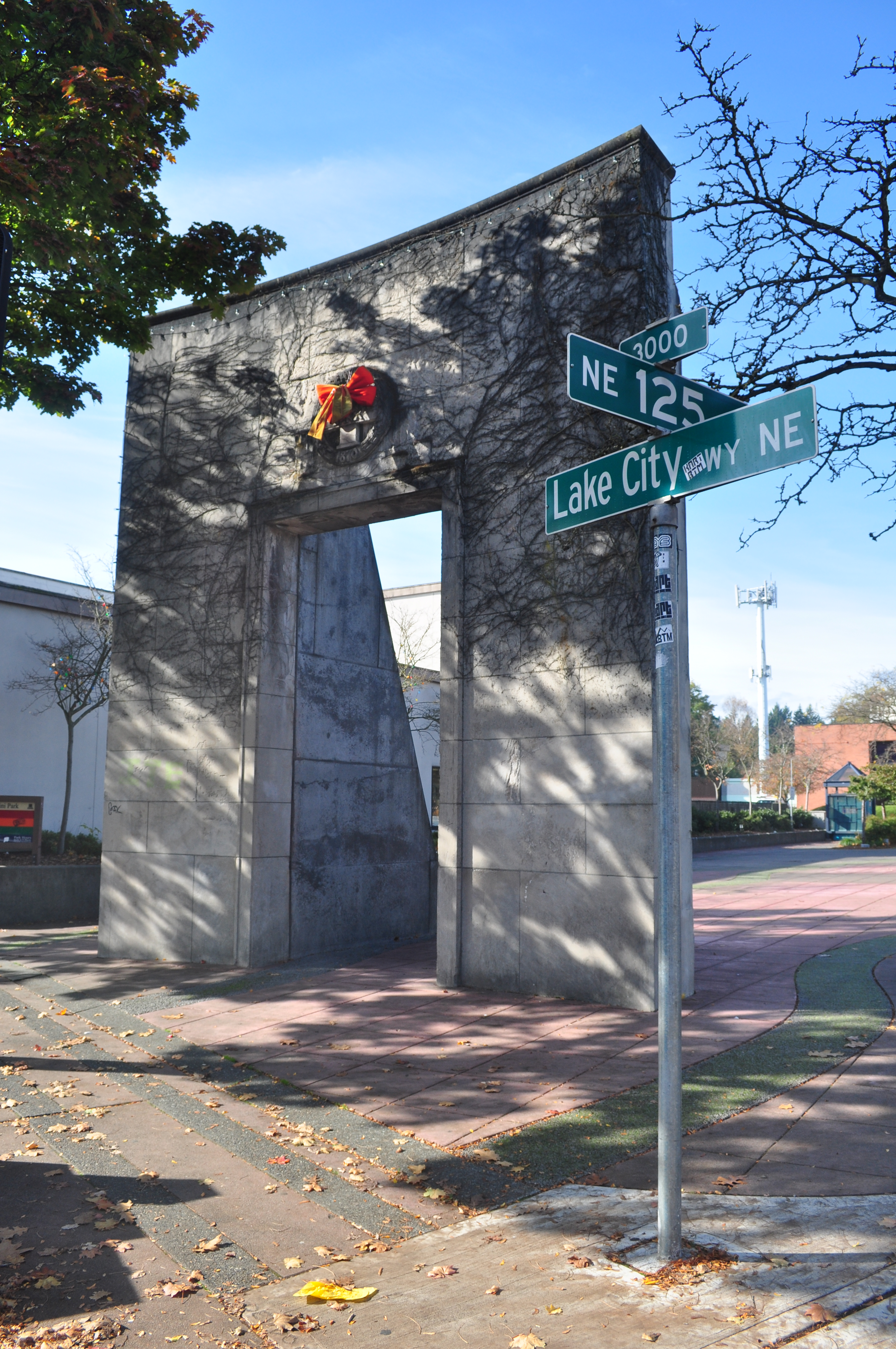
Lake City Mini Park at the southwest corner of Lake City Way NE and 125th Street NE preserves the entrance of a branch of a former Seafirst Bank.

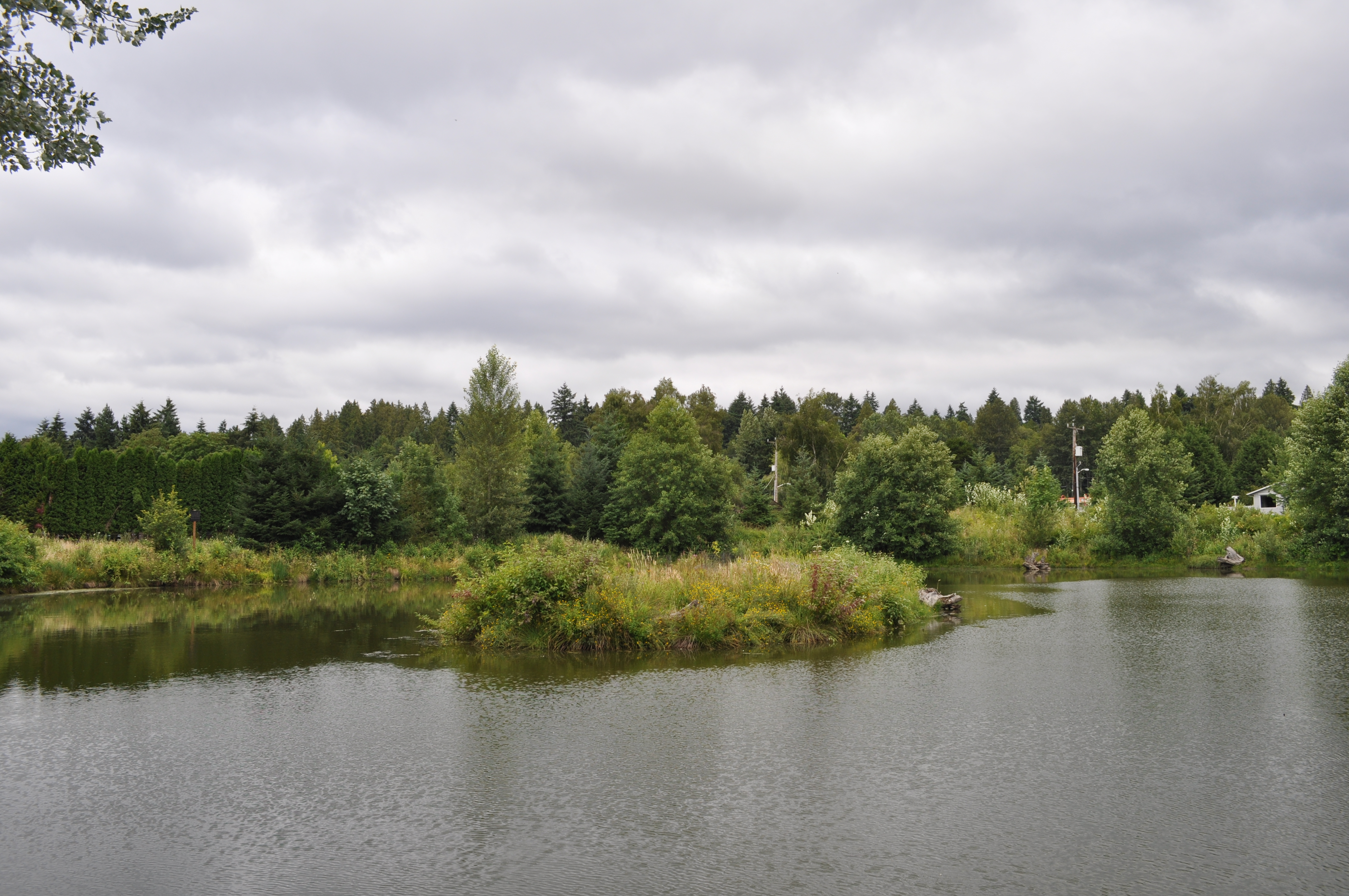
Meadowbrook Pond in Lake City

What is now Lake City has been inhabited since the end of the last glacial period (c. 8,000 BCE—10,000 years ago). The hah-chu-ahbsh (Lake People), now of the Duwamish tribe, Lushootseed (Skagit-Nisqually) Coast Salish, lived in diffuse permanent settlements along the shore of Lake Washington, dispersing in the summer, and in the winter living in large cedar long houses, each home to a couple dozen or more members of extended family groups. The lake people lost their rights in 1854. The Lake City area was clearcut by crude wagon road or by using Lake Washington, from 1850 to around the start of the 20th century, more rapidly with the Seattle, Lake Shore and Eastern Railway (c. 1886) providing easy access along what is now the Burke–Gilman Trail adjacent to the lake. Wetlands were drained. A Little Germany neighborhood of several immigrant farmers grew up in the 1870s around where Nathan Hale High School now stands.

The Seattle, Lake Shore and Eastern Railway operated a passenger stop near the current location of NE 115th St called simply, "Lake". The area was dubbed Lake City by D.H. and R.H. Lee in 1906 after they purchased and platted the land. With the advent of the automobile, the area developed linearly around major roads rather than centrally around trolley stops, as in older Seattle neighborhoods. The road to Bothell and Everett was made all-weather with brick in 1918 and then the new material asphalt in 1928. The automobile relationship with Seattle would shape Lake City development and neighborhood character. Lake City would remain relatively remote and suburban from Seattle until years after WWII.

Originally, Lake City children attended schools in the Maple Leaf, Oak Lake, and Lake Forest Park school districts. In 1912, Lake City School District No. 180 was created out of parts of each district, and the neighborhood's first school began in a house, soon moving to a permanent building at 28th Ave NE and NE 125th St.

In 1923, Lake City's Victory Heights neighborhood became the site of the Seattle area's first-known racial restrictive covenants. The Goodwin Company was developing the neighborhood and applied restrictions to three of its tracts. These covenants became a common tactic for neighborhoods to block people of color from living in them during the early 1900s, after the U.S. Supreme Court ruled against the use of city ordinances for segregating neighborhoods in 1917.

Transition to a neighborhood community was marked in 1935 with the start of the Lake City Branch Library of today as a few shelves of books in part of a room in Lake City School, shared with the WPA. Sponsorship was by the Pacific Improvement Club community group. Lake City incorporated as a township in 1949 with more than 40,000 residents; rapid growth was a product of a massive influx of young suburban families after World War II. The City of Seattle annexed Lake City and other communities in 1954 when the city limits were expanded from 85th Street to 145th Street. Scout Troop 240 and other volunteers moved thousands of books into a new library building in 1955.

Lake City relies heavily on retail commerce, and business in the area has risen and fallen based on highway expansion in the Seattle area. The expansion of Aurora Avenue North to Everett, Washington cut into business in the 1920s, but Lake City revived after NE 130th Street was paved. The opening of Northgate Mall in 1950 reduced retail business in Lake City, and the area took another hit after the construction of Interstate 5 in the 1960s. Renovation of the city core along Lake City Way NE near NE 125th Street helped revive the local economy in the late 1970s.

== Lake City Today ==
In 2006, the newly rebuilt Lake City branch of the Seattle Public Library was re-opened.

== Neighborhoods in Lake City ==
- Cedar Park
- Matthews Beach
- Meadowbrook
- Olympic Hills
- Victory Heights

== Bibliography ==
- "About the Seattle City Clerk's On-line Information Services". Information Services. Seattle City Clerk's Office. April 30, 2006.
  See heading, "Note about limitations of these data", and "Sources for this atlas and the neighborhood names used in it include".
- "Across America". Sambo's Restaurant. Archived from the original on March 12, 2007.
- Brokaw, Michael (n.d.). "Grounds Department Wetland". North Seattle Community College Grounds Maintenance. Affordable Web Development. Archived from the original on November 15, 2004.
- Dailey, Tom (n.d.). "Duwamish-Seattle". Coast Salish Villages of Puget Sound.
  Page links to Village Descriptions Duwamish-Seattle section.
  Dailey referenced "Puget Sound Geography" by T. T. Waterman. Washington DC: National Anthropological Archives, mss. [n.d.] [ref. 2];
  Duwamish et al. vs. United States of America, F-275. Washington DC: US Court of Claims, 1927. [ref. 5];
  "Indian Lake Washington" by David Buerge in the Seattle Weekly, 1–7 August 1984 [ref. 8];
  "Seattle Before Seattle" by David Buerge in the Seattle Weekly, 17–23 December 1980. [ref. 9];
  The Puyallup-Nisqually by Marian W. Smith. New York: Columbia University Press, 1940. [ref. 10].
  Recommended start is "Coast Salish Villages of Puget Sound"
- Hodson, Jeff (February 16, 2000). "Restoration urged for Thornton Creek : Local News". The Seattle Times. Archived from the original on April 21, 2008.
  Was , NF.
- Lake City (Map). Office of the Seattle City Clerk. n.d.
  Note caveat in footer.
- Lakw’alas (Speer, Thomas R.), ed. (July 22, 2004). "Chief Si'ahl". Archived from the original (DOC) on June 23, 2006.
  Includes bibliography.
- Phelps, Myra L. (1978). Public works in Seattle. Seattle: Seattle Engineering Department. ISBN 0-9601928-1-6.
- Shenk, Carol; Pollack, Laurie; Dornfeld, Ernie; Frantilla, Anne; Neman, Chris (June 26, 2002). "About neighborhood maps". Seattle City Clerk's Office Neighborhood Map Atlas. Information Services, Seattle City Clerk's Office.
  Sources for this atlas and the neighborhood names used in it include a 1980 neighborhood map produced by the Department of Community Development (relocated to the Department of Neighborhoods and other agencies), Seattle Public Library indexes, a 1984-1986 Neighborhood Profiles feature series in the Seattle Post-Intelligencer, numerous parks, land use and transportation planning studies, and records in the Seattle Municipal Archives.
  [Maps "NN-1120S", "NN-1130S", "NN-1140S".Jpg [sic] dated 13 June 2002; "NN-1030S", "NN-1040S".jpg dated 17 June 2002.]
- "Thornton Creek". Restoration. Seattle Public Utilities. 2006. Archived from the original on December 23, 2005.
- Wilma, David (December 5, 2002). "Lake City Branch, The Seattle Public Library". HistoryLink.org Essay 4031.
- Wilma, David (July 18, 2001). "Seattle Neighborhoods: Lake City -- Thumbnail History". HistoryLink.org Essay 3449.
  Wilma referenced
  David Buerge, "Seattle Before Seattle", The Weekly, 17 December 1980, p. 26;
  David Buerge, "Indian Lake Washington", The Weekly, 1 August 1984, pp. 29–32;
  Paul Dorpat, "History Lives At Lake City Speakeasy", The Seattle Times, 17 March 1979;
  Jane Cartwright, "Lake City's Death Sentence May Be Commuted", The Seattle Times, 1 March 1977;
  Clipping, "Q & A", The Seattle Times, 29 October 1997, Lake City Library;
  George Foster, "Lake City, Washington: A City Within A City", Seattle Post-Intelligencer, 2 June 1974, Northwest, 3;
  Mark Higgins, "Community Seeks Balance As Population Changes", Seattle Post-Intelligencer, 29 March 1997, (seattlep-i.nwsource.com);
  Clipping, Scott Olson, "Resident Digs Into Bawdy Past", The Lake City Star, n.d., Lake City Library, Lake City History File;
  Frank Bishop, Community Motivation. Seattle: The Craftsman Press, 1968;
  "Lake City Community Information in Seattle Public Library", typescript, Lake City Library;
  Steven Jay Abrams, "Lake City: From Rags to Riches to Rags to Riches", typescript dated 1980, Seattle Public Library;
  "Meadowbrook Pond", Seattle Public Utilities Website, (www.ci.seattle.wa.us/util/planning/meadowbrook/history1.htm);
  "Thornton Creek Watershed", report presented by Landscape Architecture Studio 504, Regional Landscape Planning, Professor Kristina Hill, University of Washington, Fall 2000 (online.caup.washington.edu/courses/LArch504);
  Don Sherwood, "Burke-Gilman Trail", in "Interpretive Essays of the Histories of Seattle's Parks and Playfields", handwritten bound manuscript dated 1977, Seattle Room, Seattle Public Library;
  Gail Lee Dubrow, Maren Van Nostrand, Cathy Tuttle, Northbrook Community History. Seattle: Seattle Parks and Recreation Department, 1995.
