= Victory Heights, Seattle =

Coordinates: 47°42′23″N 122°18′24.9″W

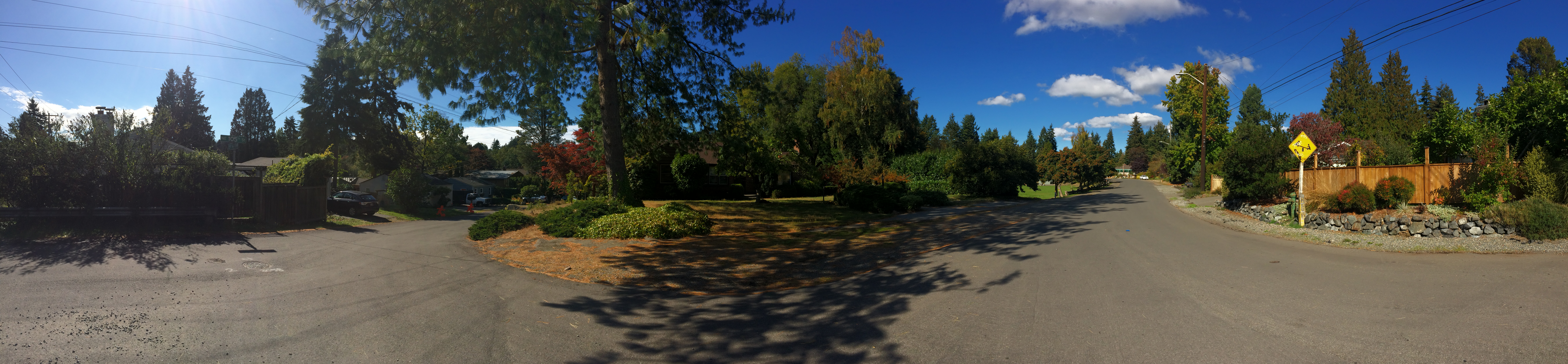
Victory Heights just south of the Victory Heights play area

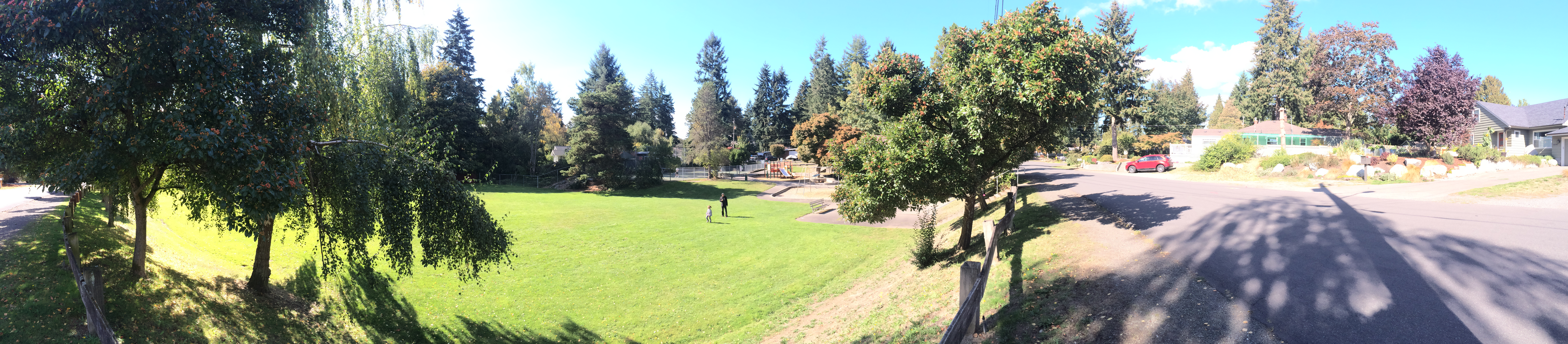
Victory Heights at the Victory Heights play area

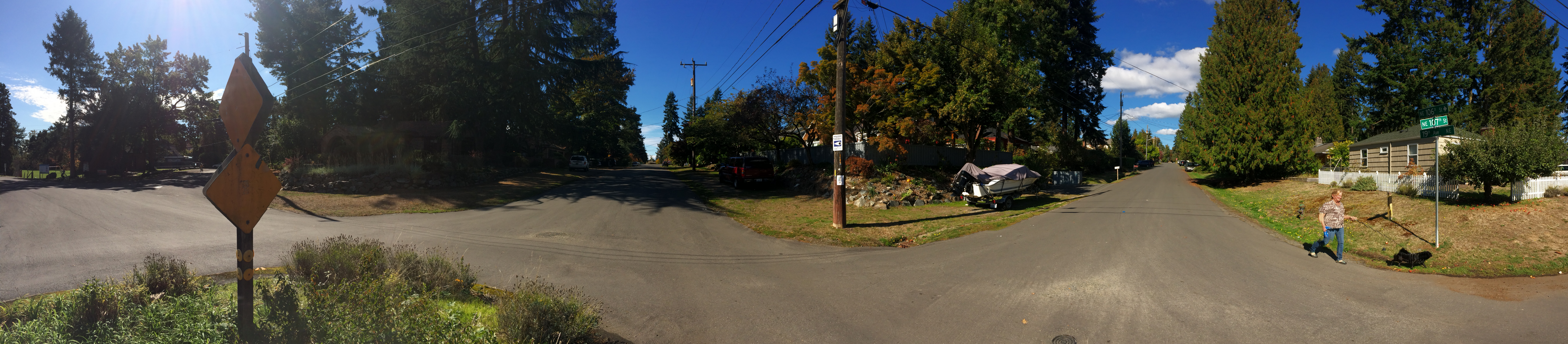
Victory Heights just north of the Victory Heights play area

Victory Heights is a neighborhood in the Lake City district of Seattle, Washington.

Victory Heights was named after the Victory Highway, which formed the eastern border of the area. The highway was originally called the Gerhart Erickson Road, the namesake of which was Gerhart Erickson, who sponsored the Good Roads legislation in 1903. The road was then renamed Bothell Road, changed to Victory Highway in 1924, before returning to Bothell Road; it is now called Lake City Way NE.

In 1923, the first-known racial restrictive covenants in the modern Seattle area were created in Victory Heights. The covenants were a common tactic to limit neighborhoods to white residents during the early 1900s, after the Supreme Court ruled in 1917 that city ordinances could not be used to segregate neighborhoods. When the Goodwin Company developed real estate in Victory Heights, they first added the covenants to three of their tracts. The neighborhood's Goodwin Way NE reflects the name of the company and its owners.

In 1954, the neighborhood was annexed to the city of Seattle along with others in Lake City.
