= Bodies of water of Seattle =

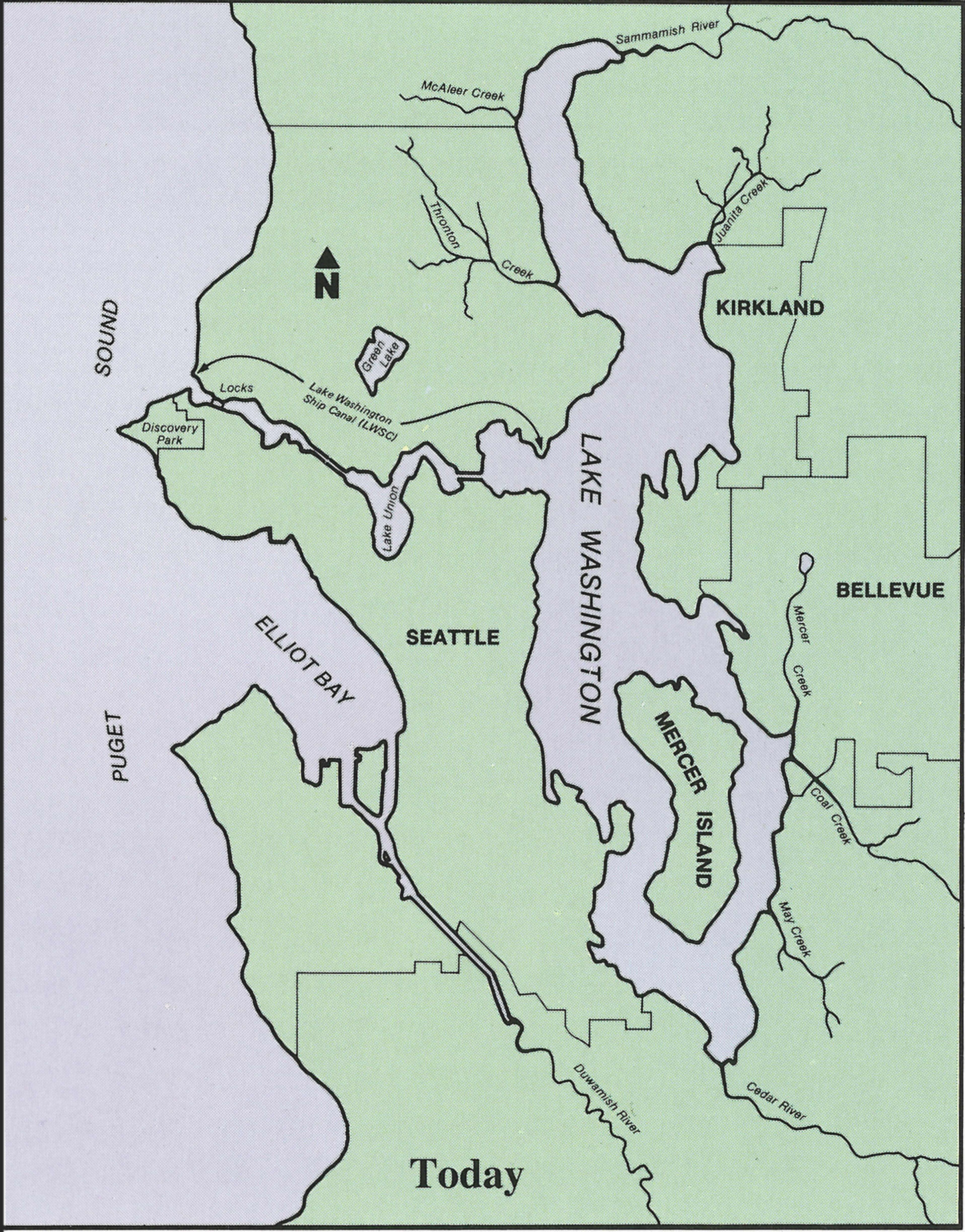
Map of waterways in Seattle and nearby areas

The city of Seattle, Washington, is located on a narrow isthmus between Puget Sound on the west and Lake Washington on the east; water comprises approximately 41% of the total area of the city. It was founded on the harbor of Elliott Bay, home to the Port of Seattle—in 2002, the 9th busiest port in the United States by TEUs of container traffic and the 46th busiest in the world.

Seattle is divided in half by the Lake Washington Ship Canal, which connects Lake Washington to Puget Sound. From east to west, it incorporates Union Bay, the Montlake Cut, Portage Bay, Lake Union, the Fremont Cut, Salmon Bay, and Shilshole Bay. The southern half of Seattle is itself divided by Seattle's largest river, the Duwamish River, which empties into the south end of Elliott Bay as the industrialized Duwamish Waterway. The lower 5.5 miles (8.9 km) of the river has been listed as a Superfund site needing environmental cleanup.

In addition, Seattle contains three other lakes, all north of the Ship Canal: Bitter Lake, Haller Lake, and Green Lake.

Seattle is home to a number of creeks. Those emptying into Puget Sound include Broadview Creek, Fauntleroy Creek, Longfellow Creek, and Pipers Creek; emptying into Lake Washington are Arboretum Creek, Ravenna Creek (via University Slough), Yesler Creek, and Thornton Creek.

The main inlets of Puget Sound are Elliott Bay, Smith Cove, and Shilshole Bay; the main inlet of Lake Washington is Union Bay.
