= Cowen Park Bridge =

Bridge in Seattle, Washington, US

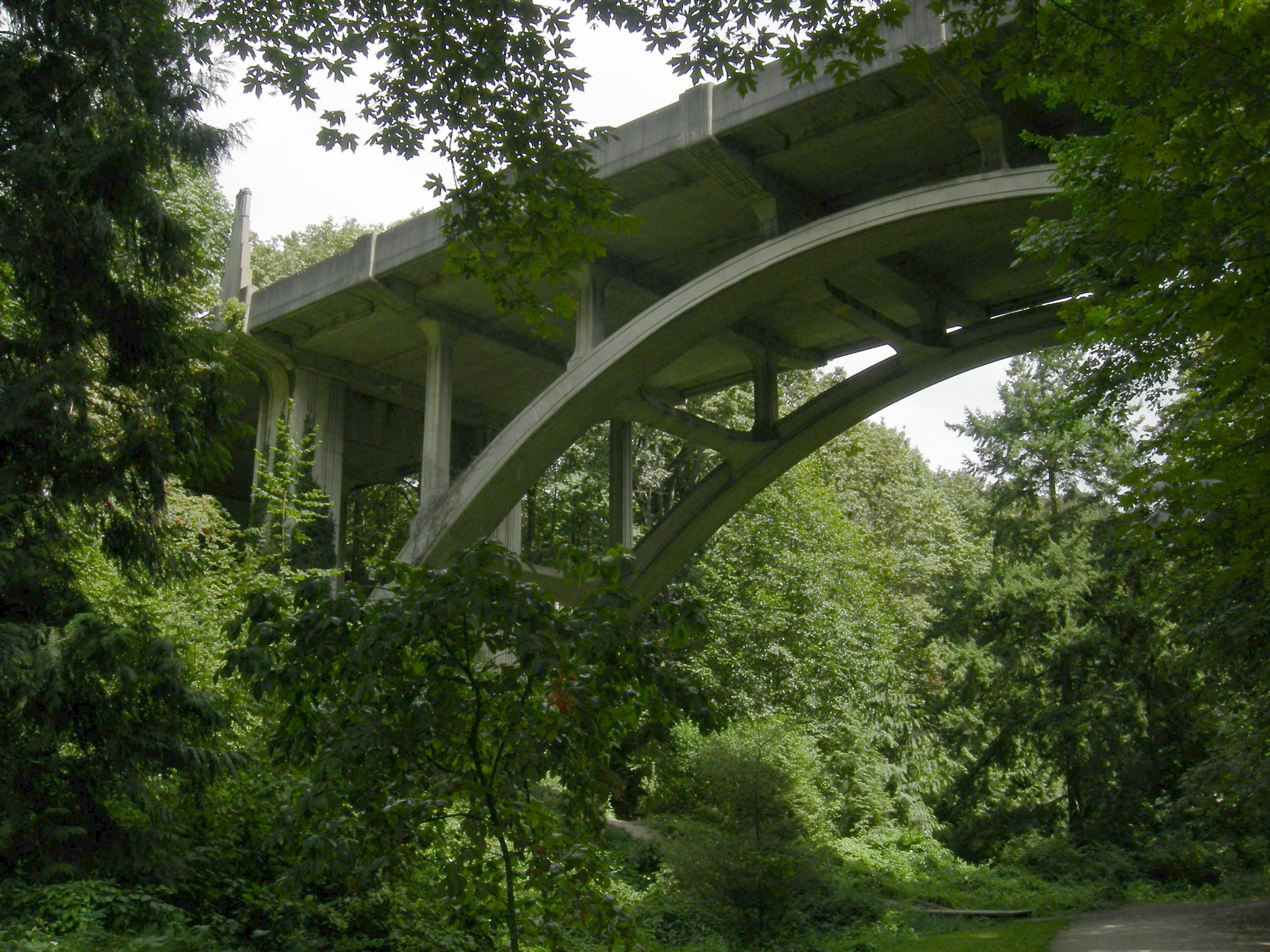
- Coordinates: 47.67332°N 122.31194°W
- Heritage status: National Register of Historic Places, Seattle city landmark

Characteristics
- Design: Deck Arch
- Material: Concrete
- Total length: 358 ft (109 m)

History
- Engineering design by: Clark Eldridge
- Opened: 1936

Location
- Interactive map of Cowen Park Bridge

- Cowen Park Bridge
- U.S. National Register of Historic Places
- Seattle Landmark
- Location: Seattle, Washington
- Built: 1936
- Architect: Clark H. Eldridge and A.J. Mahoney
- Architectural style: Art Deco
- MPS: Historic Bridges/Tunnels in Washington State TR
- NRHP reference No.: 82004233
- Added to NRHP: July 26, 1982

The Cowen Park Bridge is a reinforced concrete arch bridge in Seattle, Washington. The bridge has a length of 358 feet (109 m) and carries 15th Avenue NE across a ravine in the Cowen Park. The bridges acts as a dividing line in the Ravenna-Cowen Park contiguous area, with the smaller area west of the bridge deemed Cowen Park and the larger area east of the bridge considered Ravenna Park. The bridge, which spans from NE 62nd Street to Cowen Place NE, connects the northern Roosevelt/Ravenna neighborhood with the beginning of the University District. The Cowen Park Bridge is one of two bridges that span the Ravenna Park ravine (the other being the 20th Avenue NE Bridge built in 1913) but is the only one open to vehicular traffic.

The bridge was built in 1936 under the authority of the Works Progress Administration. The bridge engineer was Clark Eldridge. The structure is listed in the National Register of Historic Places, and it is a designated city landmark. The bridge has been praised for the 12 ft (3.7 m) Art Deco light standards along its sides.

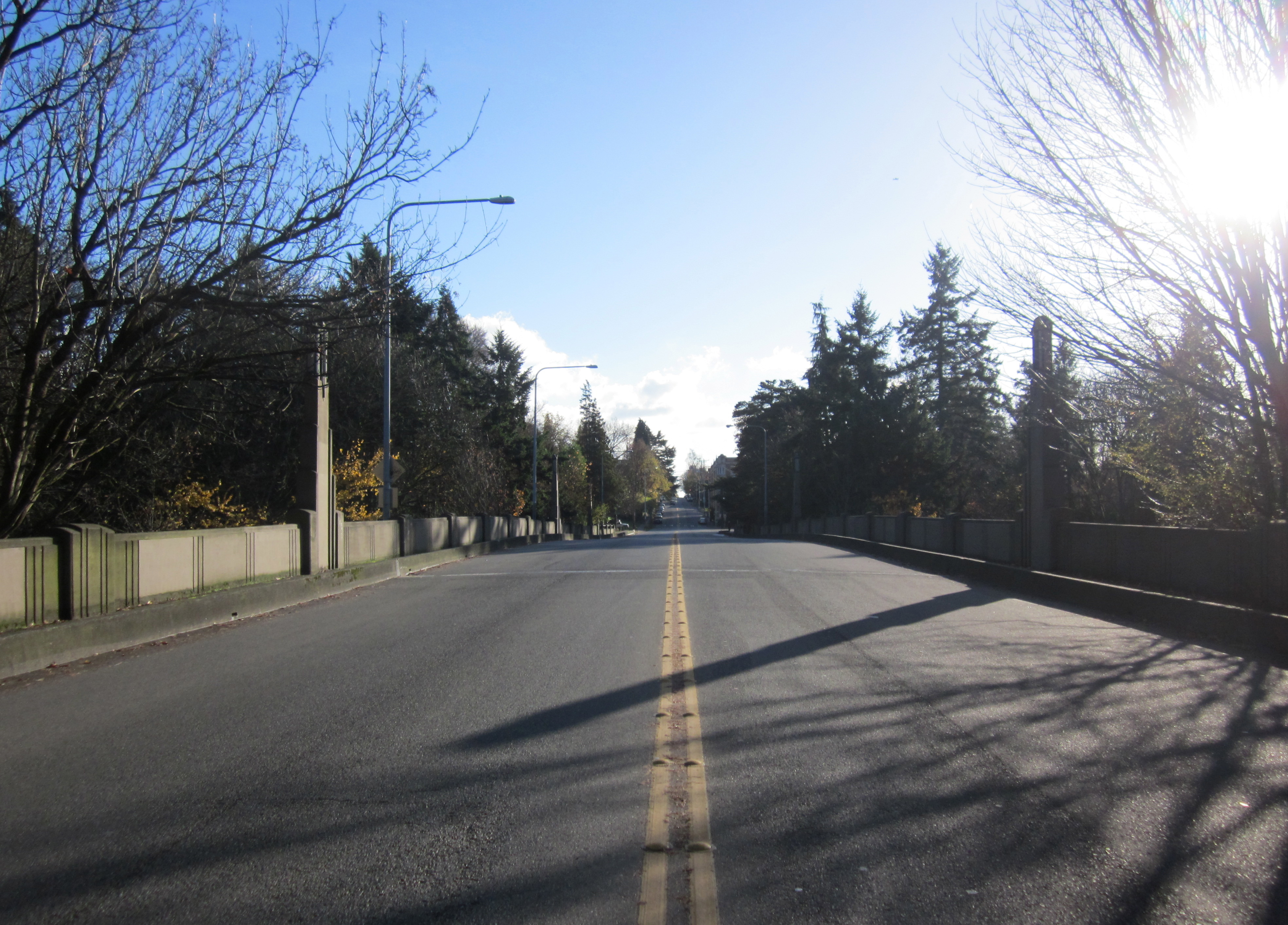
A street-level view of 15th Avenue NE as it continues along the Cowen Park Bridge.

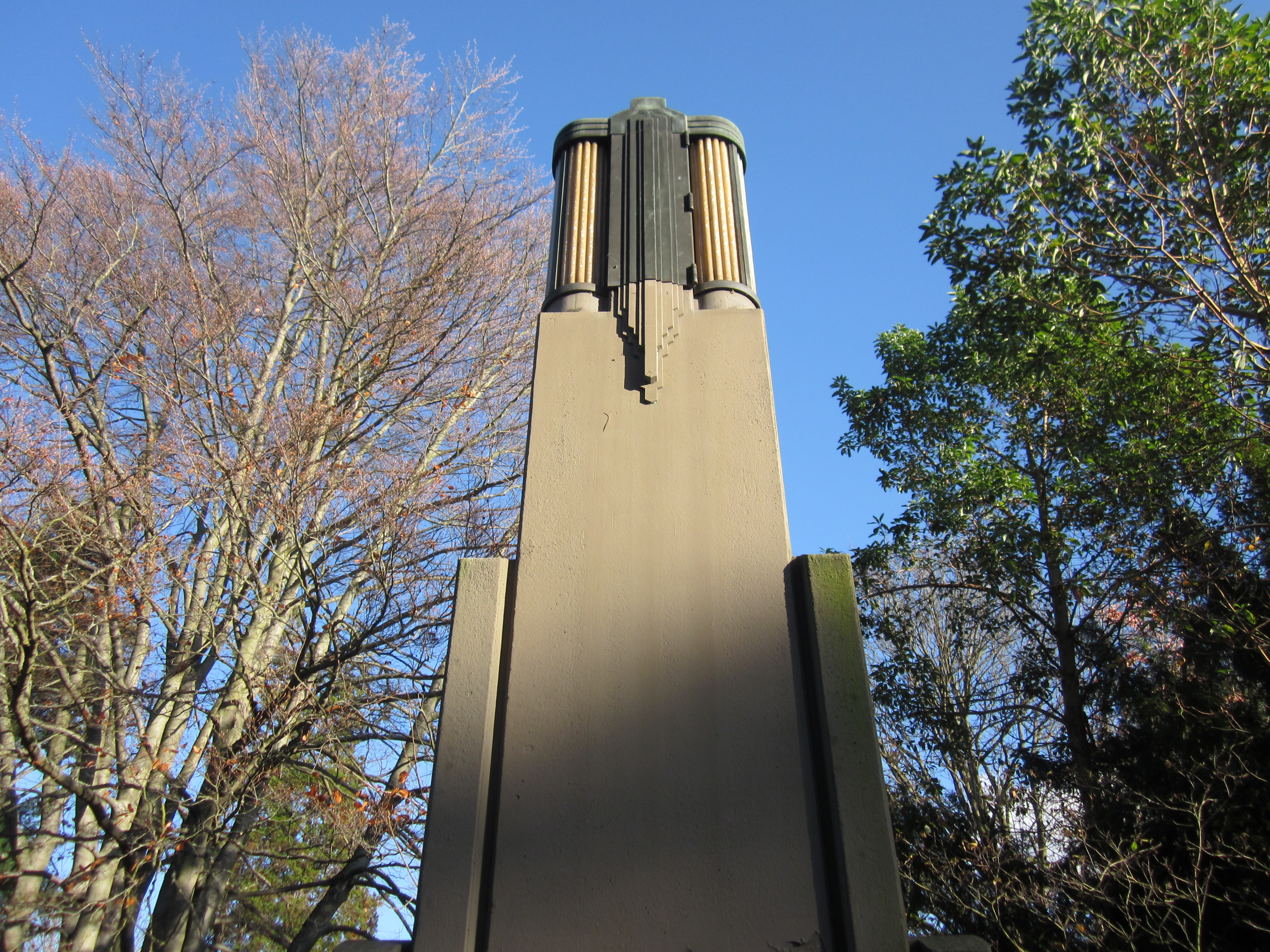
A close-up of one of the Art Deco light standards on the Cowen Park Bridge.
