= Edouardo Jordan =

American chef

- Born: 1980; St. Petersburg, Florida
- Education: University of Florida, Le Cordon Bleu (Orlando Culinary Academy)
- Culinary career
- Awardss
- 2018 James Beard Foundation Awards, Best Chef: Northwest and Best New Restaurant

Edouardo Jordan is an American chef, restaurateur, and entrepreneur based in Seattle, Washington.

== Early life and career ==
Jordan grew up in St. Petersburg, Florida and studied business at the University of Florida. He then attended the Le Cordon Bleu (Orlando Culinary Academy) and got his first kitchen job in Tampa, Florida. Jordan received an apprenticeship at The French Laundry and then worked at The Herbfarm in Woodinville, Washington. He then went to New York City to work at Per Se. He spent a month working with salumists in Parma, Italy before returning to New York to join the kitchen at Lincoln Ristorante. In 2012, he moved to Seattle to work at Matt Dillon's Sitka and Spruce. He soon became the Chef De Cuisine at Dillon's Bar Sajor.

== Restaurants ==
In 2015, Jordan opened his own restaurant, Salare in Ravenna, Seattle, with some help from a Kickstarter campaign. Salare's menu is based in Jordan's French and Italian training with some Southern influences. He was named a StarChefs Rising Star and won Eater Seattle's 2015 “Chef of the Year” title. He was named one of the Best New Chefs of 2016 by Food & Wine magazine.

In 2017, Jordan opened his second restaurant, JuneBaby, featuring Southern food and located just down the street from Salare, and it received national attention. It was selected as a Critic's Pick by Pete Wells of the New York Times. At the 2018 James Beard Foundation Awards, Jordan won the title of Best Chef: Northwest, and JuneBaby won Best New Restaurant. The Puget Sound Business Journal named Jordan to its 2018 list of 40 Under 40. Seattle Magazine named him one of Seattle's Most Influential People. People magazine named Jordan as a finalist for sexiest chef alive.

On June 8, 2021, Eater reported that Jordan had announced the permanent closing of Salare. JuneBaby closed permanently at the end of December 2023.

== Workplace misconduct allegations ==
In June 2021, The Seattle Times published an investigation in which 15 women accused Jordan of sexual misconduct, unwanted touching, and inappropriate workplace comments. Jordan denied some of the allegations and said he did not recall most of the alleged incidents. Following publication, the majority of employees at his restaurants resigned and JuneBaby temporarily suspended operations.

In July 2021, Jordan issued a second public statement acknowledging that his initial response had lacked empathy, compassion, and humility. He apologized to people he said he had hurt, mistreated, or made uncomfortable and said he had begun taking corrective actions. JuneBaby later reopened, and Jordan subsequently said that he had undergone extensive sexual-harassment training and spent time reflecting on the experience. In later years, Jordan continued to dispute aspects of the allegations and reporting, discussing his account of the events in a multi-part video series and subsequent interviews.

== Later career ==
Jordan began developing Food with Roots, a packaged food company, during his restaurant career. The brand made its retail debut at Whole Foods stores in Western Washington in 2020 with Jordan's pimento cheese. Following the closure of JuneBaby in December 2023, Jordan shifted more of his professional focus toward growing the company. In 2026, Food with Roots' Classic Southern Pimento Cheese received a Startup CPG Shelfie Award in the Dips & Spreads category. In 2026, Food with Roots' Classic Southern Pimento Cheese received a Startup CPG Shelfie Award in the Dips & Spreads category.

In July 2026, Raindrop Creamery opened in Seattle's Ravenna neighborhood at 2120 NE 65th Street, in the former Lucinda Grain Bar space next door to the former JuneBaby. The ice cream shop features rotating chef-driven flavors including sweet corn and blackberry, peach cobbler and lovage, and mango coconut.
