= JuneBaby =

Restaurant in Seattle, Washington, U.S.

- Interactive map of JuneBaby

Restaurant information
- Head chef: Edouardo Jordan
- Food type: Southern; soul food
- Location: 2122 NE 65th Street, Ravenna, Seattle, Washington, 98115, United States
- Coordinates: 47°40′33.3″N 122°18′14.7″W

JuneBaby was a Southern and soul food restaurant in the Ravenna neighborhood of Seattle, in the U.S. state of Washington. It was owned by head chef Edouardo Jordan.

== History ==
JuneBaby opened in April 2017.

JuneBaby and sister restaurant were closed in June 2021 after its staff quit in response to 15 women who reported allegations of sexual misconduct from Jordan, which was revealed in a Seattle Times investigation.

JuneBaby reopened in January 2022. It closed permanently on December 31, 2023.

== Reception ==
JuneBaby received the James Beard Foundation Award for Best New Restaurant in 2018. It was named to Esquire magazine's 2017 list of Best New Restaurants in America, and was named one of Food & Wine's ten best restaurants in 2018.

== See also ==
- List of defunct restaurants of the United States
- List of soul food restaurants
- List of Southern restaurants
