= Salare =

Defunct restaurant in Seattle, Washington, U.S.

- Interactive map of Salare

Restaurant information
- Location: Seattle, Washington, United States
- Coordinates: 47°40′33.2″N 122°18′4.3″W

Salare was a restaurant by chef Edouardo Jordan in the Ravenna neighborhood of Seattle, Washington.

== Description ==
Salare ("to cure" in Italian) has been described as a contemporary American restaurant with upscale Southern cuisine. The Not for Tourists Guide to Seattle says the restaurant offered farm-to-table "with influences from all over". Eater Seattle called the food an "Italian-French-African-Southern blend". Salare's menu was influenced by the chef's African American culinary heritage. The restaurant served jerk chicken, goat curry, and trout escovitch.

== History ==
Chef Edouardo Jordan opened the restaurant in June 2015. The restaurant closed in 2021.

== Reception ==
Eater critic Bill Addison included Salare in a 2016 list of the 21 best new restaurants in the U.S. The business earned Jordan a James Beard Foundation Award for Best Chef: Northwest in 2018.

== See also ==
- List of defunct restaurants of the United States
