= Ravenna Park =

Recreation and green space in Seattle, Washington, U.S.

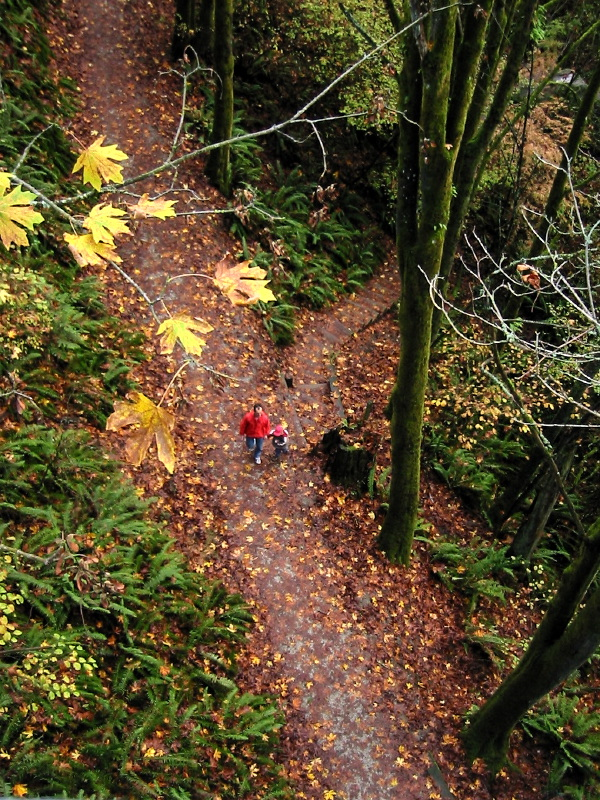
- Fall foliage and trail, from the 20th Avenue NE Bridge
- Interactive map of Ravenna Park
- Type: Urban Park
- Location: Seattle, Washington
- Coordinates: 47°40′18″N 122°18′22″W
- Established: 1906; 120 years ago
- Operator: Seattle Parks and Recreation

Ravenna Park and Cowen Park comprise a single contiguous recreation and green space between the Ravenna and Roosevelt neighborhoods of Seattle, Washington in the United States. These public parks encompass the ravine with a maximum depth of 115 feet (35 m) through which Ravenna Creek flows.

== History ==
The ravine that is the central feature of Cowen and Ravenna Park was formed when melt-off from the Vashon Glacial Ice Sheet formed Lake Russell and proceeded to cut drainage ravines through new glacial fill. Lake Russell disappeared when the ice sheet retreated north of the Strait of Juan de Fuca, but some features remained, including the Green Lake drainage basin, which continued to empty through the Ravenna ravine into Lake Washington. The deeper pockets of the basin became Bitter Lake, Haller Lake and Green Lake. Many creeks, brooks, and springs fed into Green Lake, whose outlet was on the east side of the route of Ravenna Boulevard, in a deepening ravine which became Cowen and Ravenna parks.

Ravenna Creek's original source was from Green, Haller, and Bitter lakes, then the Cowen Park ravine west wall when the watershed was diverted to sewers (1908–1948). The water table is relatively shallow, held by the extensive layer of clays that underlay the metro region. The creek source is actually seeping from the original west wall of the ravine, even though the gulch has been partially filled at the southwest corner of Cowen Park. The inscription on the gateway to Cowen Park states, "In memory of Charles Cowen, who in 1906 gave to the City of Seattle the twelve acres comprising this park." Cowen (actual surname Cohen, changed upon his arrival to America) was an English native who came from a family of South African diamond merchants. Upon his arrival in Seattle in 1900 he purchased 40 acres of logged-off land around the present day park, later platting the Cowen Park Addition. After the nearby University of Washington campus was chosen for the site of the Alaska-Yukon Exposition, the area underwent a rapid urbanization. As well as numerous houses, Cowen built the Ye College Inn, which he strategically located near the exposition's main entrance.

For many decades of Seattle city history, the Ravenna Park ravine had been ignored by loggers and farmers and still possessed full old-growth timber rising nearly 400 feet (120 m). Most of the land was owned by mining and real estate magnate William Wirt Beck who, in addition to preserving the ravine's trees for park land, would give Ravenna its name (after Ravenna, Italy) and would plat one of the first subdivisions in the neighborhood in 1890 around the home he built that still stands East of the park at NE 60th Street and 26th Avenue NE. The trees remained through the Alaska–Yukon–Pacific Exposition of 1909, at which they were featured exhibitions. Public awareness of the trees declined after their gradual disappearance in suspicious circumstances by 1926. Today, none of that size remain anywhere in the world. The story of the trees was later told in "The Mystery of Ravenna Park," an investigative 1972 magazine article in the Seattle Post-Intelligencer by William Arnold.

In 1919, after the death of Theodore Roosevelt, the city renamed the park "Roosevelt Park", but Seattleites petitioned to revert to the original name in 1931.

In the mid-1960s, the Cowen Park ravine was largely filled using freeway construction spoils. The City of Seattle planned to use the ravine for staging a comprehensive stormwater drainage piping project in 1986, galvanizing the neighborhoods of the watershed to protect and restore the park. Since 1991, the park has seen major restoration by residents of neighborhoods in collaboration with the City.

Park in early 20th century
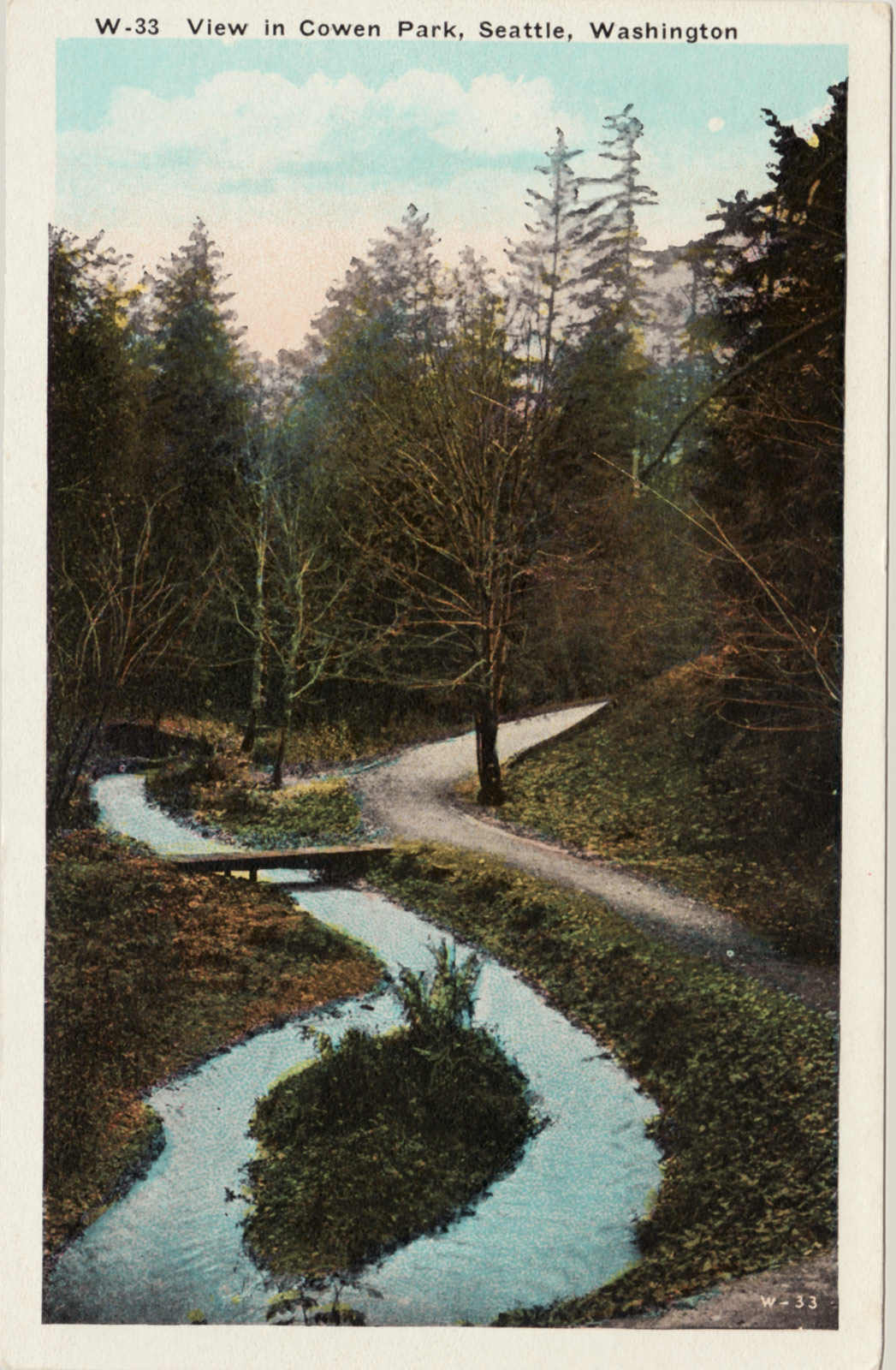
Ravenna Creek in 1909

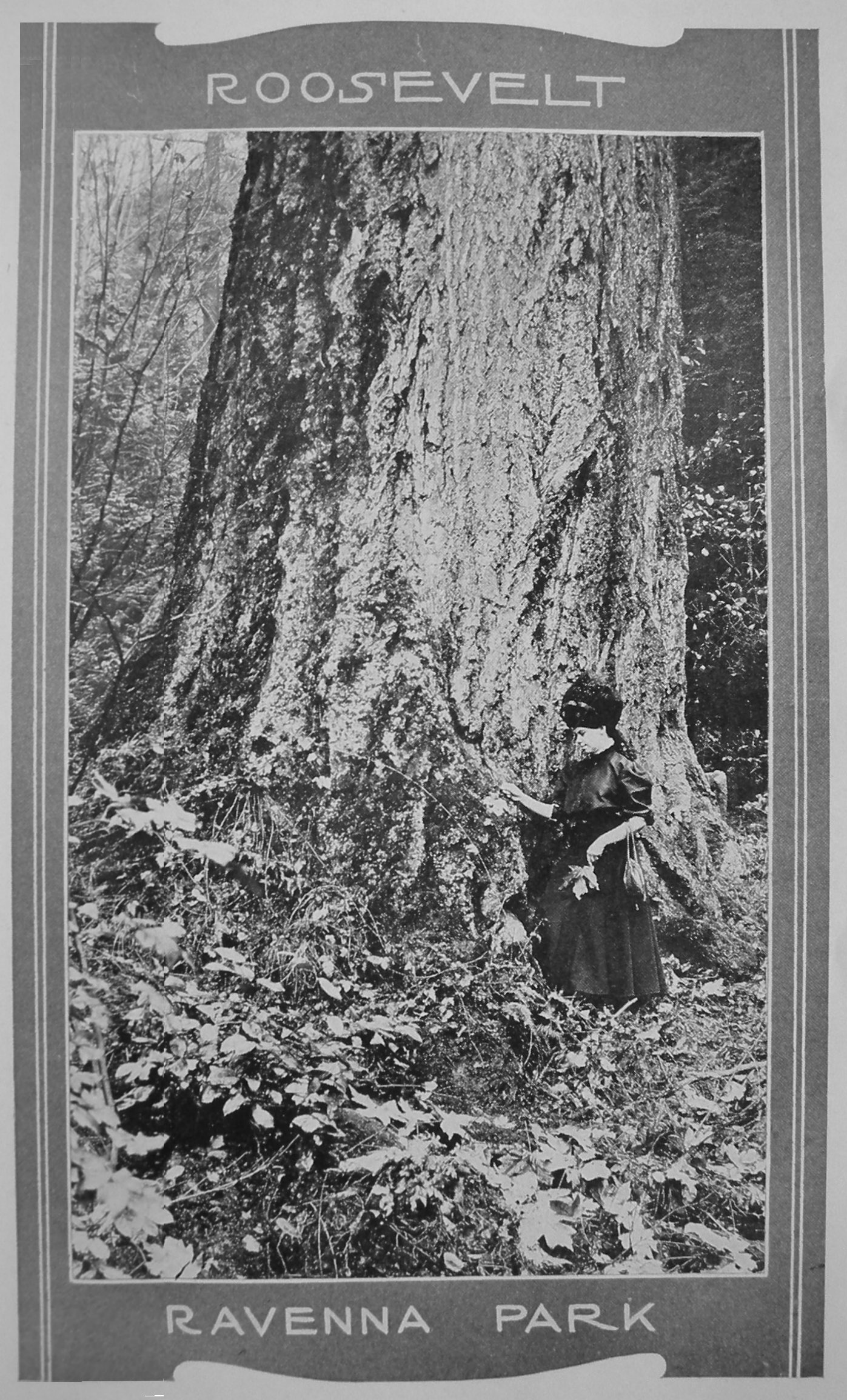
A lost legacy, trees like this one remained in 1915, but they had been removed by 1926.

== Description ==
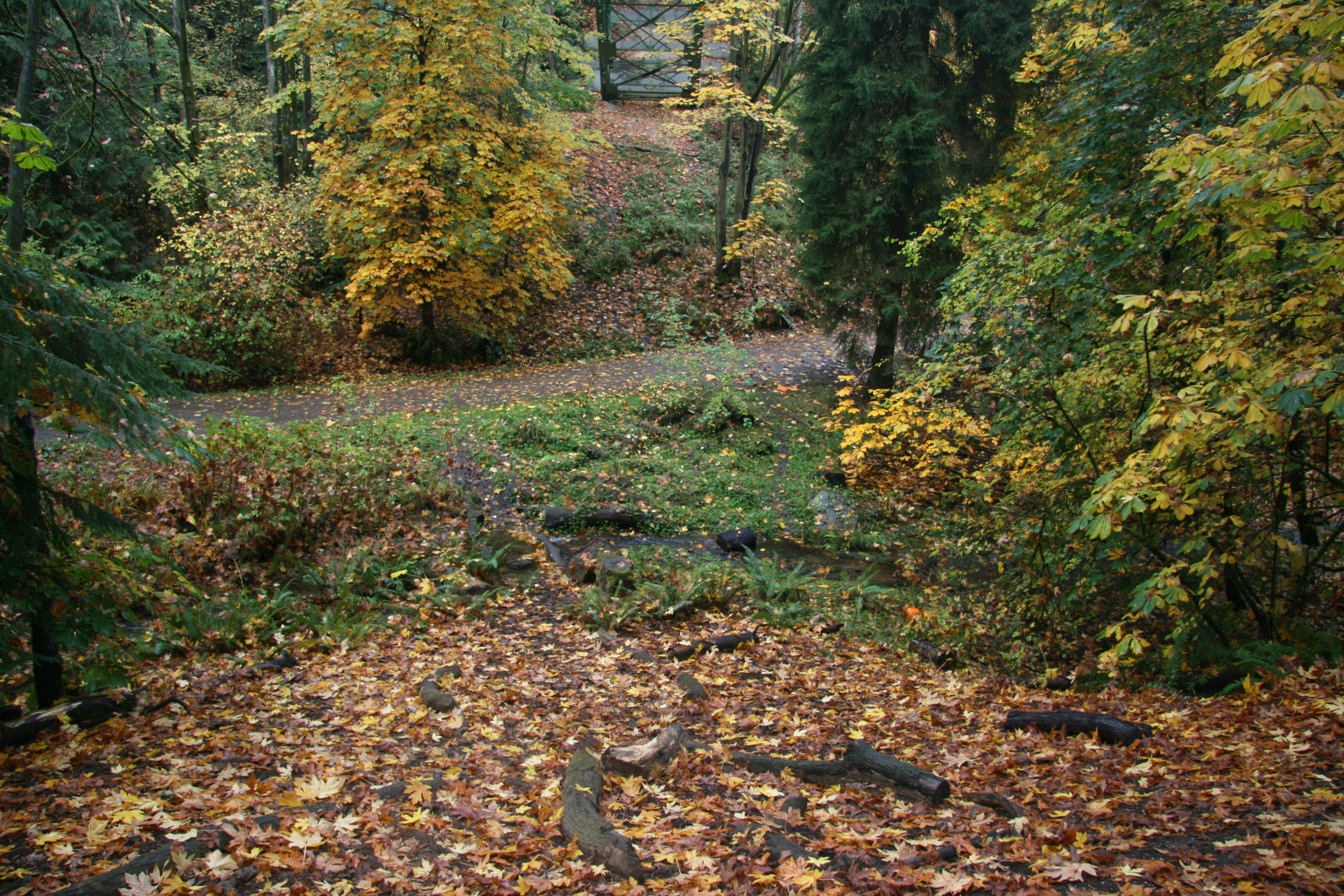
Ravenna Creek seen flowing through the ravine during the fall of 2008

Ravenna Park contains 49.9 acres (20.2 ha) and was purchased from developers in 1911. Cowen Park covers 8.4 acres (3.4 ha). The current source of Ravenna Creek is the west face of the ravine along Brooklyn Avenue NE and a small wetland in the northwest corner, at NE 62nd Street. In 2006, a section of Ravenna Creek through the southeastern end of the park was daylighted, having formerly flowed into a storm drain. The parks are crossed from north to south by the Cowen Park Bridge, on 15th Avenue Northeast on the boundary between the two parks, and the 20th Avenue Northeast Bridge (also known as the Ravenna Park Bridge), closed to motorized traffic since 1975. Both bridges are on the National Register of Historic Places. There is also a rail trail along the southern edge of the park where David Denny's Ravenna streetcar line once ran.

=== Ravenna Park ===
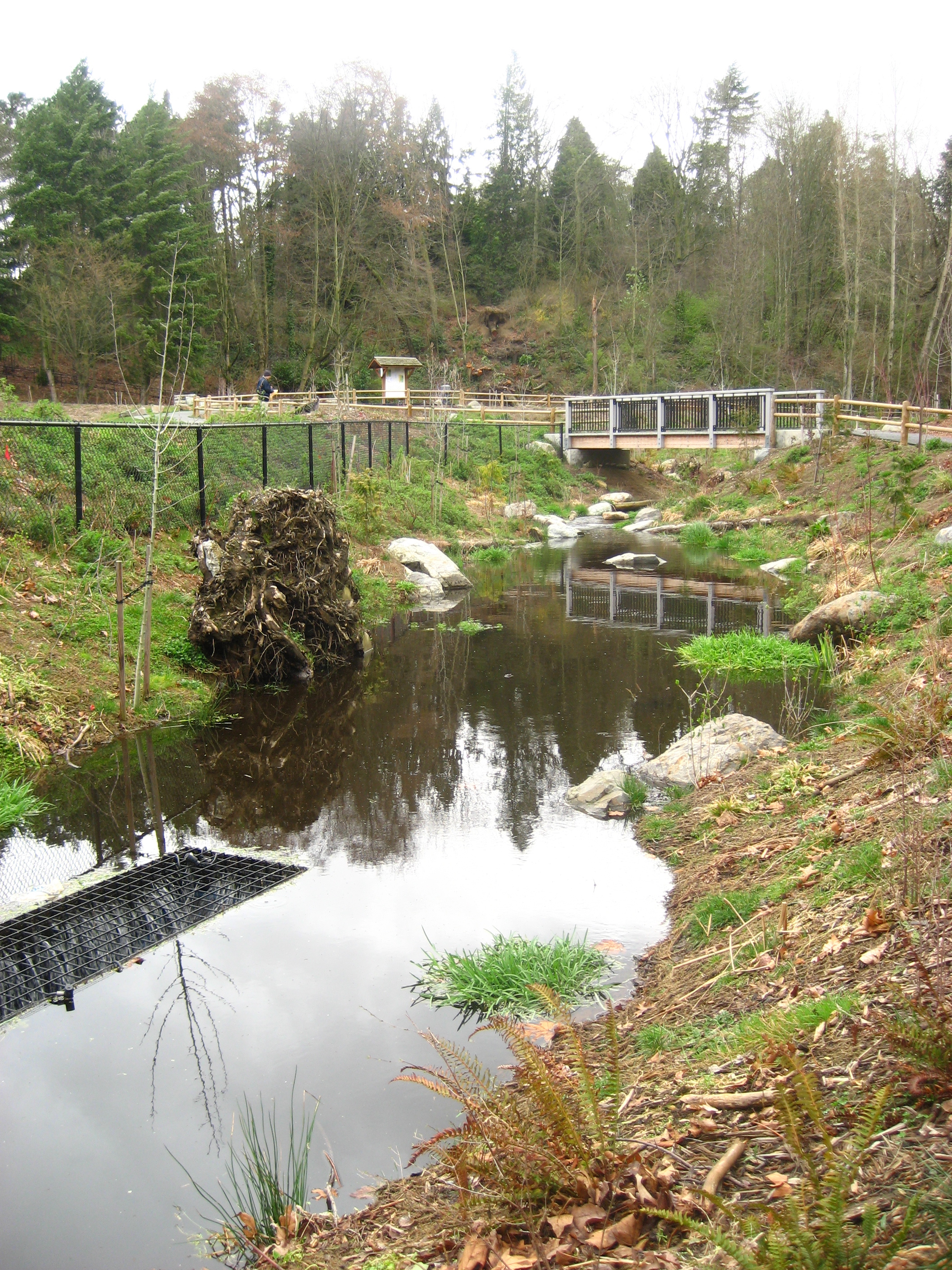
Daylighted creek at recreation fields, spring 2007

Ravenna Park is a 1/2 mile (800 m) wooded ravine which connects two picnic areas just north of the University District. The park is open to hikers, joggers, bikers, and picnickers. The park also features a play area for children, a wading pool, ballfield, trails, and tennis courts.

== Flora ==
The parks are mostly forested with native Bigleaf Maple, Douglas Fir, grand fir, Western Hemlock, Western White Pine and Western Redcedar. Nonindigenous trees include Coast Redwood, Incense-cedar, and Western Larch.

There are workparties in the park held by the Seattle Parks Department, particularly in April and May. A volunteer group, Friends of Ravenna Ravine, works to remove invasive species, such as English Ivy and Himalayan Blackberry from the park and restore native vegetation.

== See also ==
- Ravenna-Cowen North Historic District
