= Sitka and Spruce =

Defunct restaurant in Seattle, Washington, U.S.

- Interactive map of Sitka and Spruce

Restaurant information
- Established: 2006
- Closed: December 31, 2019
- Owner: Matt Dillon
- Chef: Matt Dillon
- Location: 1531 Melrose Avenue, Seattle, Washington, 98122, United States
- Coordinates: 47°36′53″N 122°19′42″W

Sitka and Spruce was a restaurant by Matt Dillon in Seattle, in the U.S. state of Washington. The business earned Dillon a James Beard Foundation Award in the Best Chef: Northwest category.

== Description ==
Seattle Metropolitan said, "The restaurant ... evolves with every new chef, but the space in Melrose Market remains forever atmospheric, with its vintage glass panes and pastoral open kitchen. Current steward Danny Conkling carries the torch of a restaurant whose brunch menu should get way more acclaim." Sitka and Spruce specialized in foraged foods. The menu included a chicken, salmon, young lettuce salad, parsnips braised in nduja, porchetta, and cookies. On Mondays, the restaurant served Mexican cuisine.

== History ==
Chef and owner Matt Dillon opened in 2006, initially operating in a strip mall on Eastlake. The business relocated to Capitol Hill's Melrose Market on Market Avenue in 2010. It expanded with a bar inside Melrose Market in 2014. Edouardo Jordan worked at the restaurant.

In September 2019, Dillon announced plans to close Sitka and Spruce permanently on New Year's Eve (December 31). He wrote, "Sitka & Spruce will always be alive in her energy. We will always participate in the relationship and conversation between our beautiful place in the world and everyone and everything that makes it turn and makes it whole. But at this mesmerizing juncture of our world, continuing Sitka’s relationship in Seattle, does not make me a better father, partner, activist, employer or friend. And that is the future. To be better. It has to be, and it will."

== See also ==
- List of defunct restaurants of the United States
