= Matt Dillon (chef) =

American chef and restaurateur

- Born: 1973 (age 52–53); San Bernardino, California
- Education: Seattle Central Community College
- Culinary career
- Previous restaurant(s): Sitka & Spruce, Bar Ferd’nand, Bar Sajor, Ciudad, Copal, Bar Ferdinand, London Plane, The Corson Building
- Award(s) won: 2012 James Beard Award, Best Chef: Northwest

Matt Dillon is an American chef and restaurateur in Seattle, Washington.

He graduated from O'Dea High School and attended culinary school at Seattle Central Community College. He worked at Salish Lodge and The Herbfarm before opening his own restaurant in 2006, Sitka & Spruce.

Although the restaurant only had twenty seats and was located in a strip mall in Eastlake, Seattle, Sitka & Spruce quickly gained notoriety for Dillon's seasonal menu. Dillon was named a “Best New Chef” by Food & Wine in 2007.

In 2008, he opened a second restaurant, the Corson Building in Georgetown, Seattle, serving a tasting menu for over $100 per person. In late 2009, Dillon moved Sitka & Spruce to the new Melrose Market in Capitol Hill (Seattle), opening Bar Ferd’nand, an adjacent wine bar and shop. In 2010, he bought 20 acres of land on Vashon Island, which he developed into a farm supplying fruits, vegetables, chicken and pigs to his restaurants. In 2012, he began selling round country loaves at the Melrose Market, baked in the Corson Building's wood-fired oven, which gained a reputation for being the best bread in the city.

At the 2012 James Beard Foundation Awards, Dillon won the title of Best Chef, Northwest.

In 2013, Dillon opened Bar Sajor in Pioneer Square, Seattle, part of a revitalization of that neighborhood. A year later, he opened London Plane across the street, and in 2016, Bar Sajor was reopened as Copal.

Dillon opened Bar Ferdinand in Capitol Hill in 2016, seeking to use as many ingredients as possible from his Vashon Island farm. Over time, Dillon has focused more of his time on farming, giving over control (and ownership) of several of his restaurants to his chefs.
