= Union Bay Natural Area =

Restored remainder of the former Union Bay and Union Bay Marsh

- Location within Washington (state)
- Location: Seattle, Washington, United States
- Coordinates: 47°39′21″N 122°17′38″W
- Area: 50 acres (20 ha)
- Established: 1972
- Governing body: University of Washington

The Union Bay Natural Area (UBNA) in Seattle, Washington is the restored remainder of the Union Bay Marsh. It is located at the east end of the main University of Washington campus, south of NE 45th Street and west of Laurelhurst. Part of the UW Center for Urban Horticulture, it is managed by the UW Botanic Gardens. On the western edge of the UNBA is the University Slough (Drainage Canal), which connects Ravenna Creek to Union Bay and Lake Washington. The canal extends from NE 45th Street, between the driving range and IMA Sports Field 1, south to the bay, ending southeast of the Husky Ballpark baseball grandstand (northeast of the IMA Building). The eastern edge of the UBNA area includes Yesler's Swamp. The UBNA is 74 acres with 4 miles of shoreline and a 1 mile long loop trail, and serves as a public wildlife area and restoration laboratory.

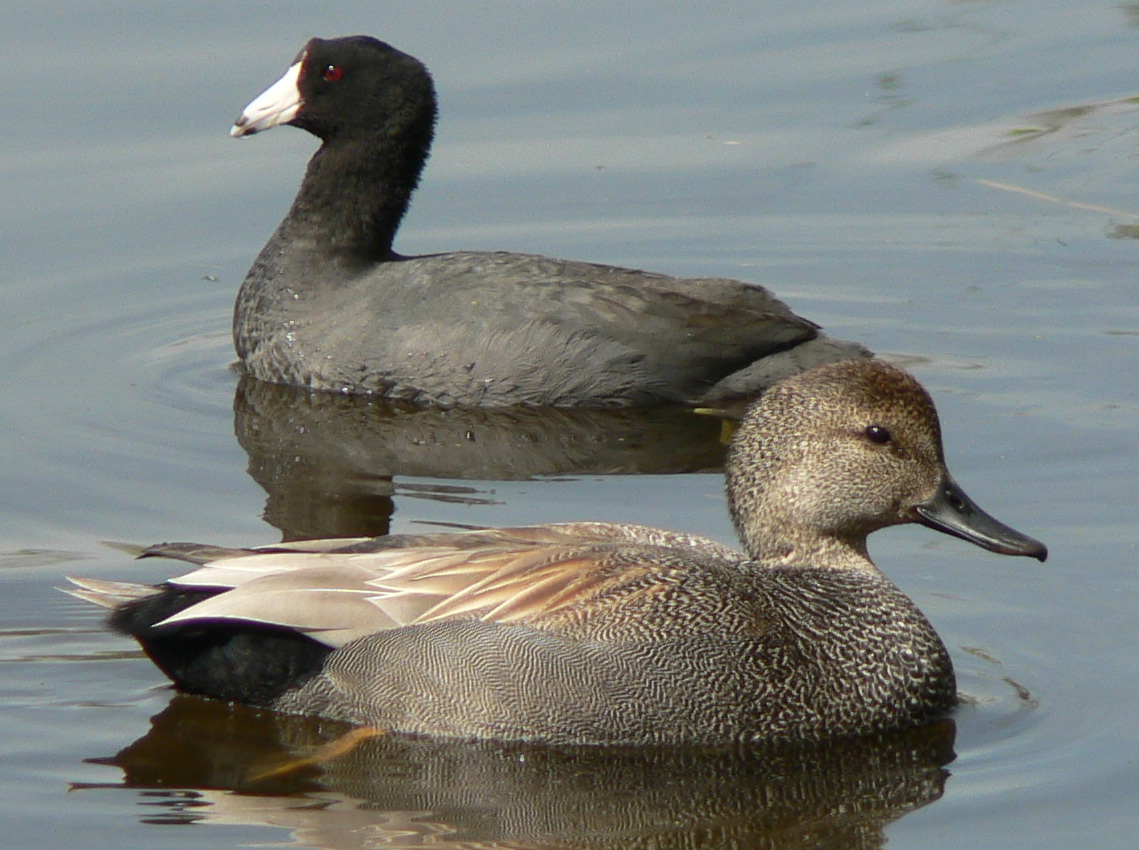
Gadwall male with American coot behind on West Pond, UBNA

The little grasslands, modest ponds, and lake shoreline of the UBNA is a sanctuary for birds (including double-crested cormorants, great blue herons, and eagles); turtles and frogs may be seen. The UBNA is notable for diverse habitats including a good-sized lake, small permanent ponds, seasonal ponds, woods, sample prairie, and marshland. The interfaces among these make the area particularly attractive for birdwatching, with more than 150 species of birds sighted.

Before the lowering of Lake Washington during the early part of the 20th century, Ravenna and Yesler Creeks flowed into marshland north of where the canal now begins, and the land through which the canal would be cut lay under the waters of Union Bay. The Burke-Gilman Trail follows the Seattle, Lake Shore and Eastern Railway line along the original shoreline of Union Bay past the UW power plant and University Village. The opening of the Montlake Cut as part of the construction of the Lake Washington Ship Canal lowered the water level of Lake Washington by nine feet, greatly enlarging the size of the wetlands on the north shore of Union Bay. The newly exposed land was deemed unsuitable for building construction and therefore to have little use or value. After the University acquired the land, the northeast corner was established as the Montlake Dump, (home of J. P. Patches, resident 1958–1981).

Formerly the Montlake Landfill, University Dump, or Ravenna Landfill, it was used by the City of Seattle for residential and industrial solid waste from 1911 to 1966. It was fully closed five years later and overlaid with two feet of clean soil. Most of the land has been built upon by University Village (1956), UW athletic fields, buildings, and main parking lot E; the remainder comprises the UBNA, colloquially called "the fill".

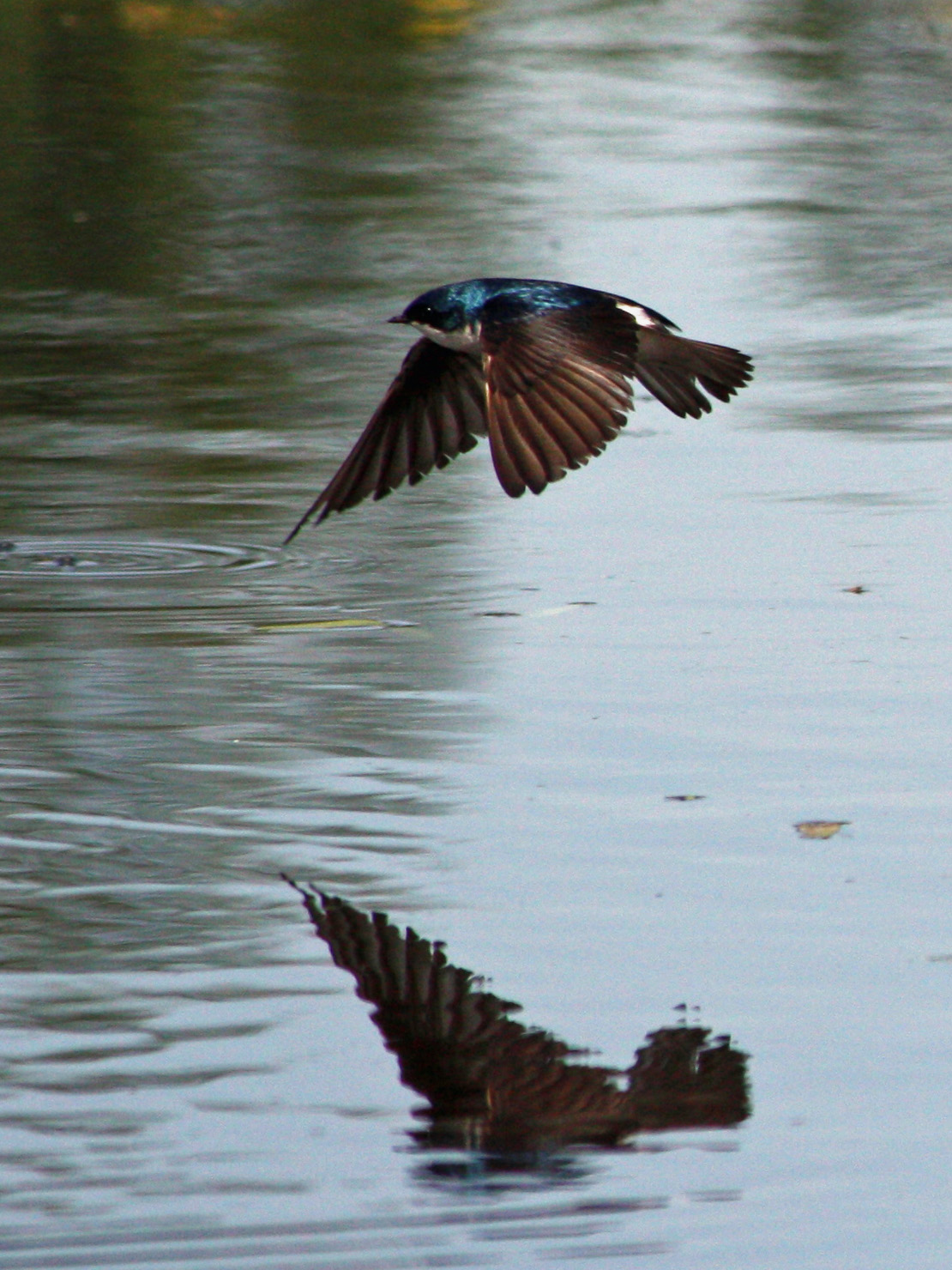
Tree swallow (Tachycineta bicolor) over the south pond

Construction was completed in 2006 on a project that reconnects partially daylighted Ravenna Creek to Union Bay by piping it underground to the canal, thus converting the upper reach from a relatively stagnant drainage to the outlet for one of Seattle's partially restored urban creeks. Daylighting from southeast Ravenna Park to the UW and the UBNA has been blocked by the owners of University Village

The UBNA is owned by the State of Washington and held under the aegis of the University of Washington; access is controlled. Parts of the Area are open during park hours, access to other portions is discouraged, some portions seasonally, for habitat or species protection.

Many restoration projects take place at UBNA. Removal of invasive species, such as Himalayan blackberry (Rubus armeniacus) and morning glory (Convolvulus arvensis), are part of a continual effort to restore the site to a natural area. Volunteers account for much of the progress in the Union Bay Natural Area.

== See also ==
- Thornton Creek
- Urban horticulture
- Water resources

== Bibliography ==
- "About the Seattle City Clerk's On-line Information Services", Information Services, Seattle City Clerk's Office. Retrieved 21 April 2006. See heading, "Note about limitations of these data".
- "Appendix G: List of Campus Buildings" (PDF). Campus Master Plan. University of Washington. 28 May 2003.
- Dolan, Maria & True, Kathryn (2003). "Reclaiming Paradise: Union Bay Natural Area" and "Northeast Seattle: Lakes, Ponds, Springs, and Wetlands", in Nature in the city: Seattle, pp. 148–150 and p. 223. Seattle: Mountaineers Books. ISBN 0-89886-879-3 (paperback).
  Particularly useful.
- "Chronology". Ravenna Creek Alliance. August 1998. Archived from the original on 20 December 2004.
- Gurriere, Joe (3 May 2006). "Windermere Real Estate Cancels Fireworks to Protect Nesting Eagles", Windermere Real Estate Company. Retrieved 14 May 2006.
- "HISTORY @ UBNA". Center for Urban Horticulture, Departments of the University of Washington. January 1999. Archived from the original on 17 May 2006.
- O'Neil, Kit, University Community Urban Center, (n.d. [1997 per http://home.earthlink.net/~ravennacreek/chronology.htm ]). "Ravenna Creek Daylighting Project". Retrieved 21 April 2006.
- Parrish, Geov (10 May 2006). "A Parks Lesson Learned: A citizen, the city, a corporation, and a sound decision.", The Seattle Weekly. Retrieved 14 May 2006.
- Phelps, Myra L. (1978). Public works in Seattle. Seattle: Seattle Engineering Department. ISBN 0-9601928-1-6.
- P-I Staff (4 May 2006). "Nesting eagles stop fireworks show", The Seattle Post-Intelligencer. Retrieved 14 May 2006.
- "Union Bay Natural Area". Center for Urban Horticulture, (n.d.). Retrieved 21 April 2006.
- "University District". Seattle City Clerk's Neighborhood Map Atlas (n.d., map NN-1120S.Jpg dated 13 June 2002), retrieved 21 April 2006. Note caveat in footer.
- Shenk, Carol; Pollack, Laurie; Dornfeld, Ernie; Frantilla, Anne; Neman, Chris (June 2002). "About neighborhood maps". Seattle City Clerk's Office Neighborhood Map Atlas. Information Services, Seattle City Clerk's Office.
  Sources for this atlas and the neighborhood names used in it include a 1980 neighborhood map produced by the Department of Community Development (relocated to the Department of Neighborhoods and other agencies), Seattle Public Library indexes, a 1984–1986 Neighborhood Profiles feature series in the Seattle Post-Intelligencer, numerous parks, land use and transportation planning studies, and records in the Seattle Municipal Archives.
  [Maps "NN-1120S", "NN-1130S", "NN-1140S".Jpg [sic] dated 13 June 2002; "NN-1030S", "NN-1040S".jpg dated 17 June 2002.]
- Stein, Alan J. (2 March 2003) "Patches, Julius Pierpont", HistoryLink. Retrieved 21 April 2006. Stein referenced Jack Broom, "The J.P. Generation", Pacific Magazine, The Seattle Times, 4 April 1993, pp. 6–11,14–17;
  Bill Cartmel, "Hi Ya, Patches Pals", Seattle Post-Intelligencer, 11 April 1971, pp. 6–7;
  Erik Lacitis, "Patches Understands – and Survives", The Seattle Times, 23 February 1978, p. A15;
  [no titles], The East Side Journal, 31 May 1962, p. 3; Ibid. 14 May 1969, p. 19.
- University of Washington Computing and Communications, Facilities Services (2005). "Northeast Campus Map", UW Home > UWIN > About the UW > Campus Maps. Modified 18 May 2006, retrieved 21 May 2006.
- University of Washington Publication Services (Revised September 1991). "The University of Washington Campus & Vicinity" map. Compiled, designed, drafted in cooperation between Physical Plant and the Department of Geography, August 1971, revised Sherman (August 1991). Seattle: University of Washington.
- UW Publication Services & UW Facility Services (Revised July 1996). "The University of Washington Campus & Vicinity" map. Seattle: University of Washington.
- Walter, Sunny & local Audubon chapters (updated 10 February 2006). "Sunny Walter's Washington Nature Weekends: Wildlife Viewing Locations – Greater Seattle Area". Retrieved 21 April 2006. Walter excerpted from Dolan, Maria & True, Kathryn (2003). Nature in the city: Seattle. Seattle: Mountaineers Books. ISBN 0-89886-879-3 (paperback).
  [With additions by Sunny Walter and local Audubon chapters.]
  On-line of the book, but only the viewing locations.
