= Ravenna Creek =

Stream in Seattle, Washington, U.S.

Coordinates: 47°40′07″N 122°18′09″W

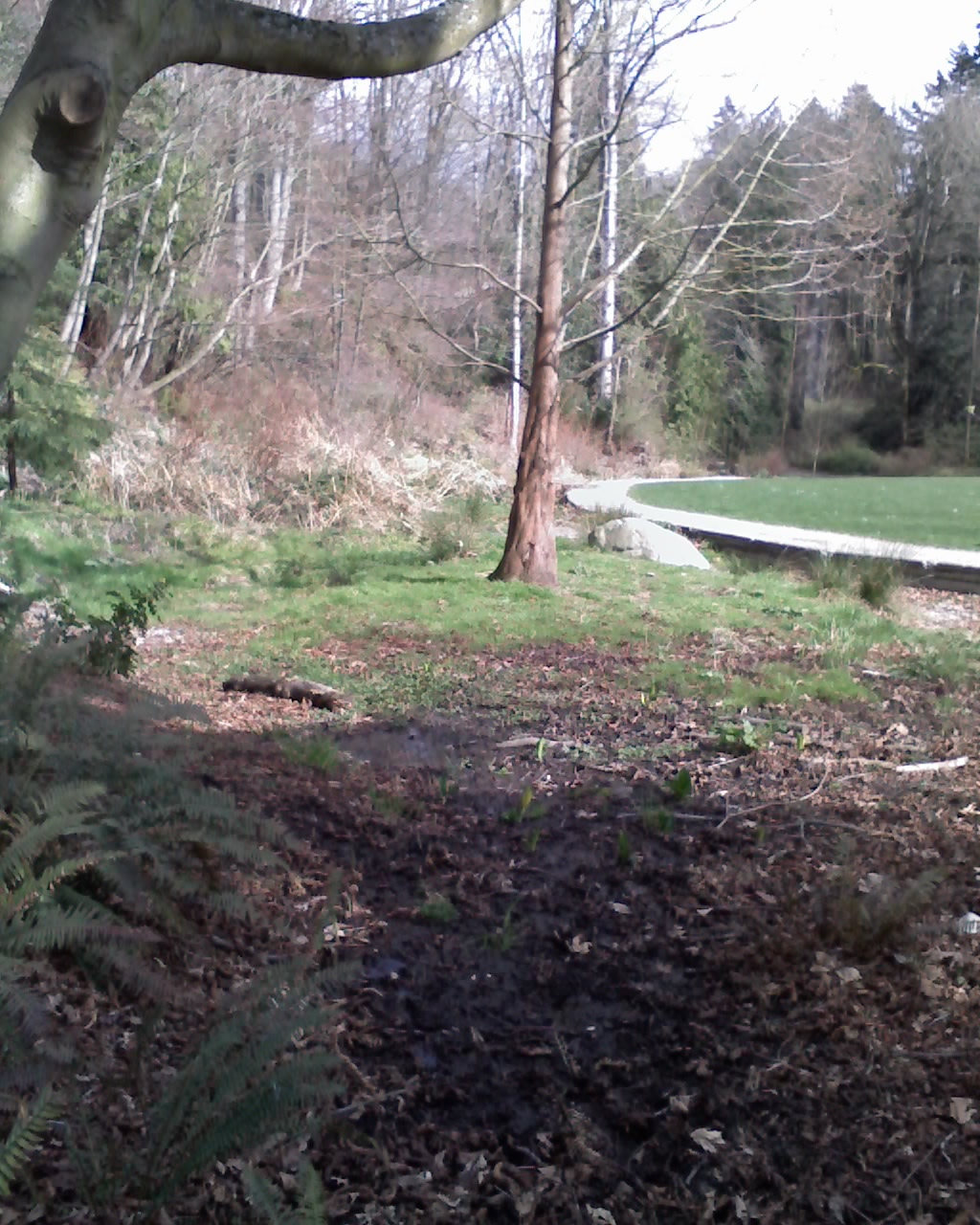
Creek headwaters in Cowen Park, winter 2008

Ravenna Creek is a stream in the Ravenna and Roosevelt neighborhoods of Seattle, Washington, whose present daylighted length of nearly 3,500 feet (1.1 km) is entirely within the Ravenna & Cowen Parks.

Ravenna Creek used to drain Green Lake into Lake Washington's Union Bay, but urban development and the lowering of the two lakes in 1911 and 1916 resulted in the disappearance of the creekbed between Green Lake and Cowen Park and between Ravenna Park and Union Bay. Ravenna Creek's current source is a wetland in the northwest corner of Cowen Park, at NE 62nd Street and Brooklyn Avenue NE. It is also fed by springs throughout Ravenna Park, and is joined there by a second branch which begins near the intersection of NE 65th Street and 23rd Avenue NE. Until 2006, the creek ended at a sewer grate where the park's trail system opened into a soccer field.

A daylighting project completed in May 2006 disconnected the creek from the sewer system and extended its bed 650 feet (200 m) towards the southeast corner of Ravenna Park, at which point it enters a pipeline. This pipeline, which runs southward along 25th Avenue NE to the NE 45th Street viaduct, empties into University Slough, thereby reconnecting Ravenna Creek to Lake Washington.

In 2008, a major sewage spill of 8,000,000 US gallons (30,000,000 L) of raw sewage flooded the creek in an accident caused by King County utility crews working nearby.

== Gallery ==
Creek views over time
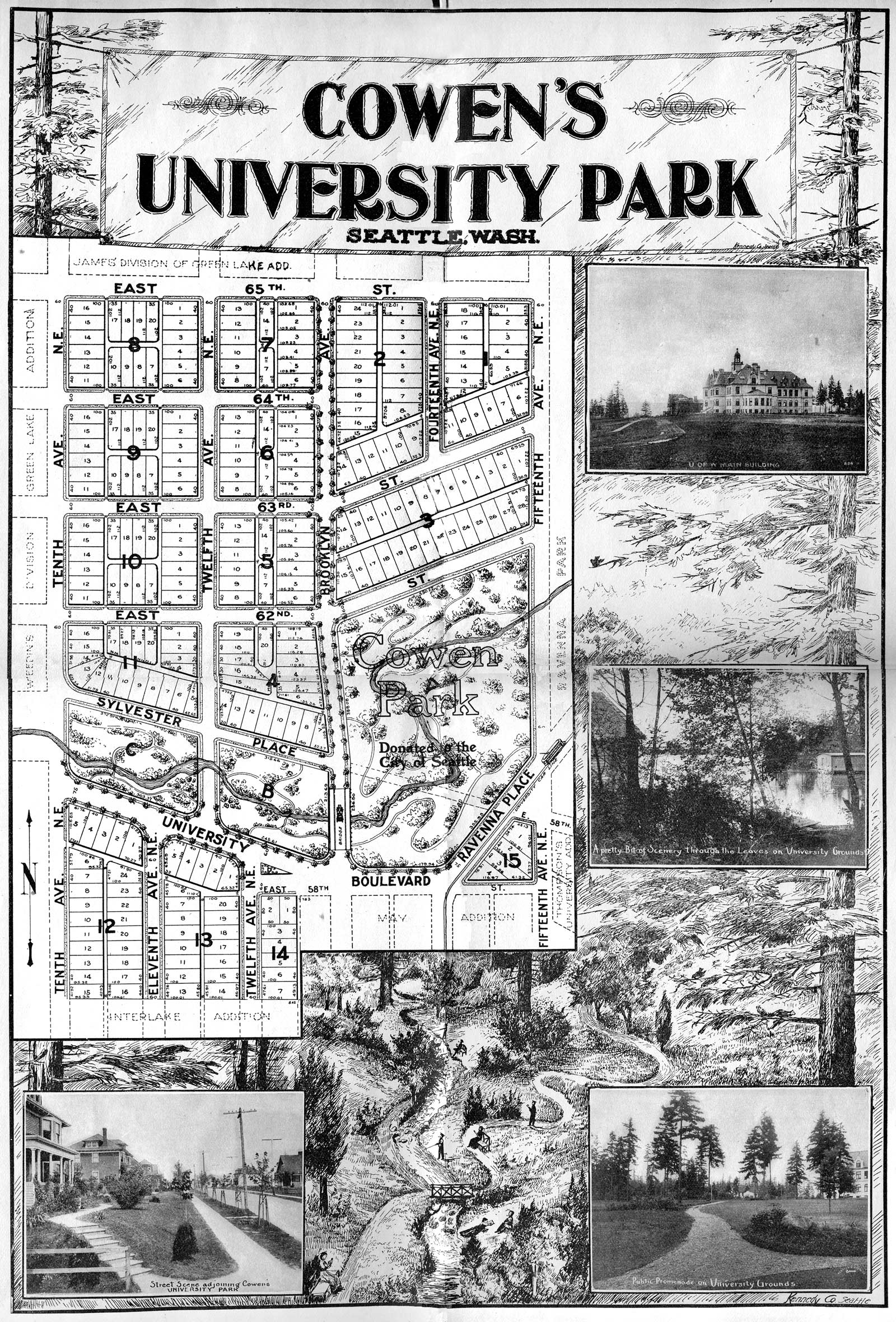
Map of Cowen's University Park Addition showing original course of Ravenna Creek

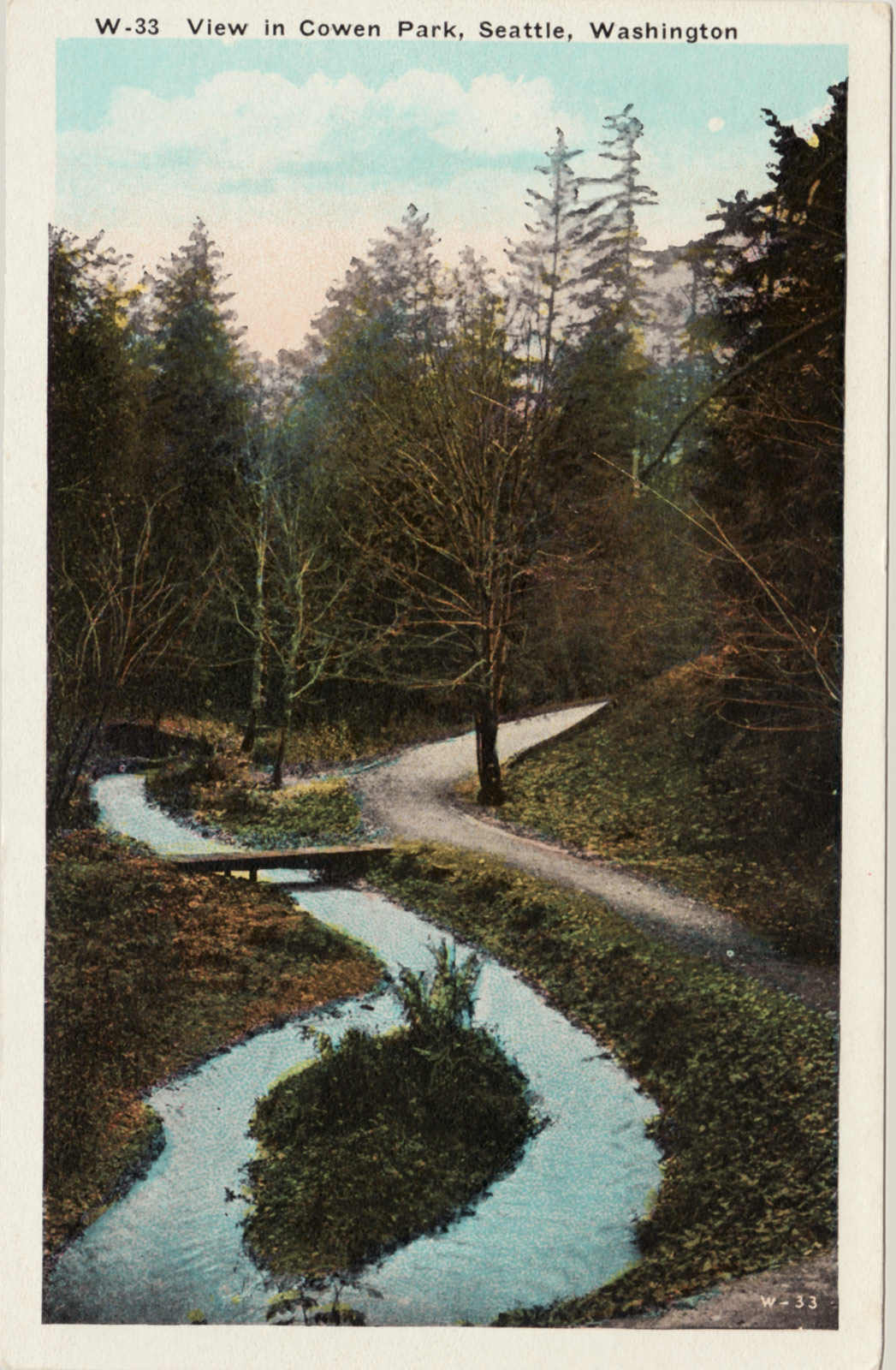
Ravenna Creek in 1909

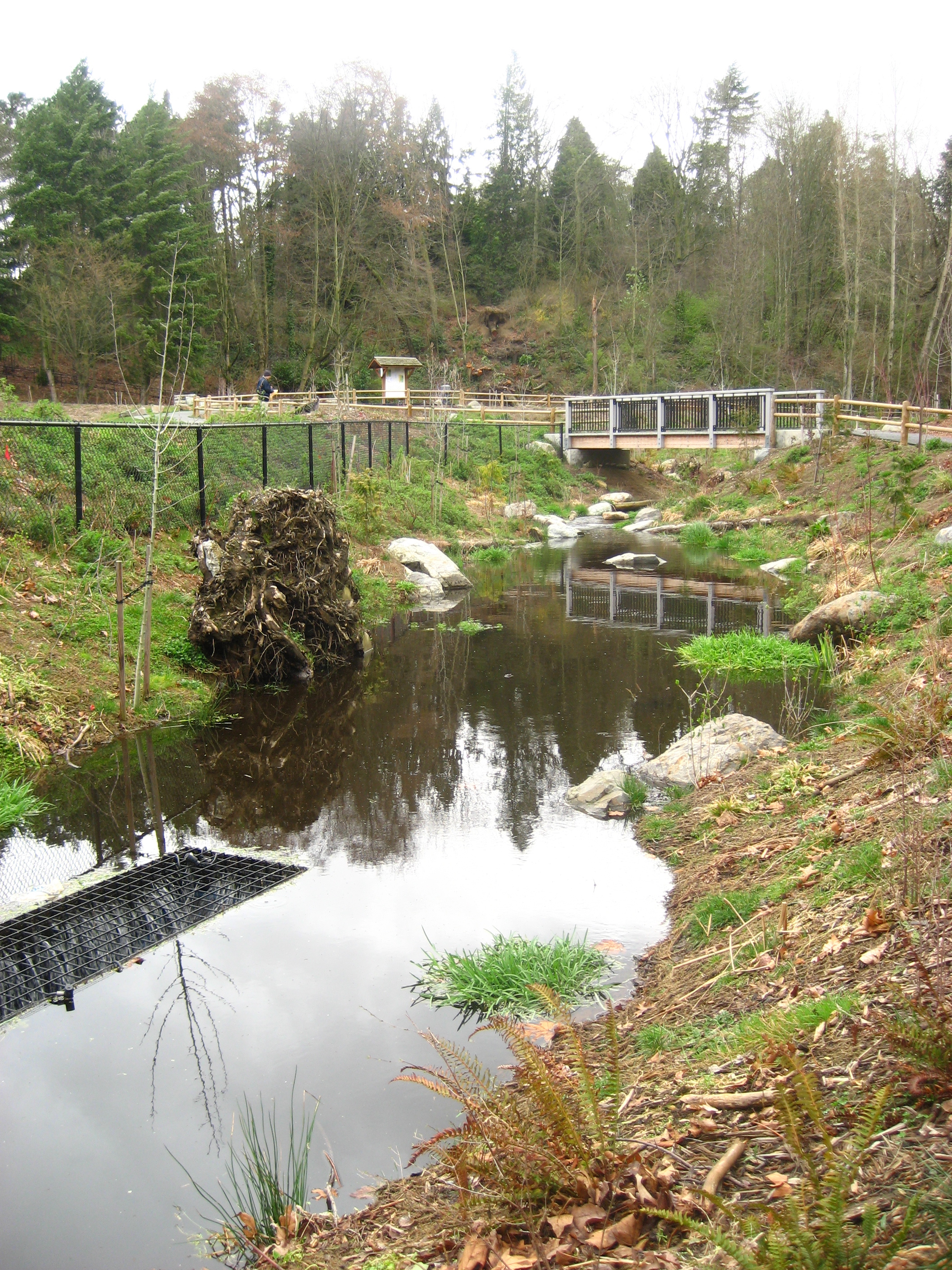
Daylighted creek at recreation fields, spring 2007

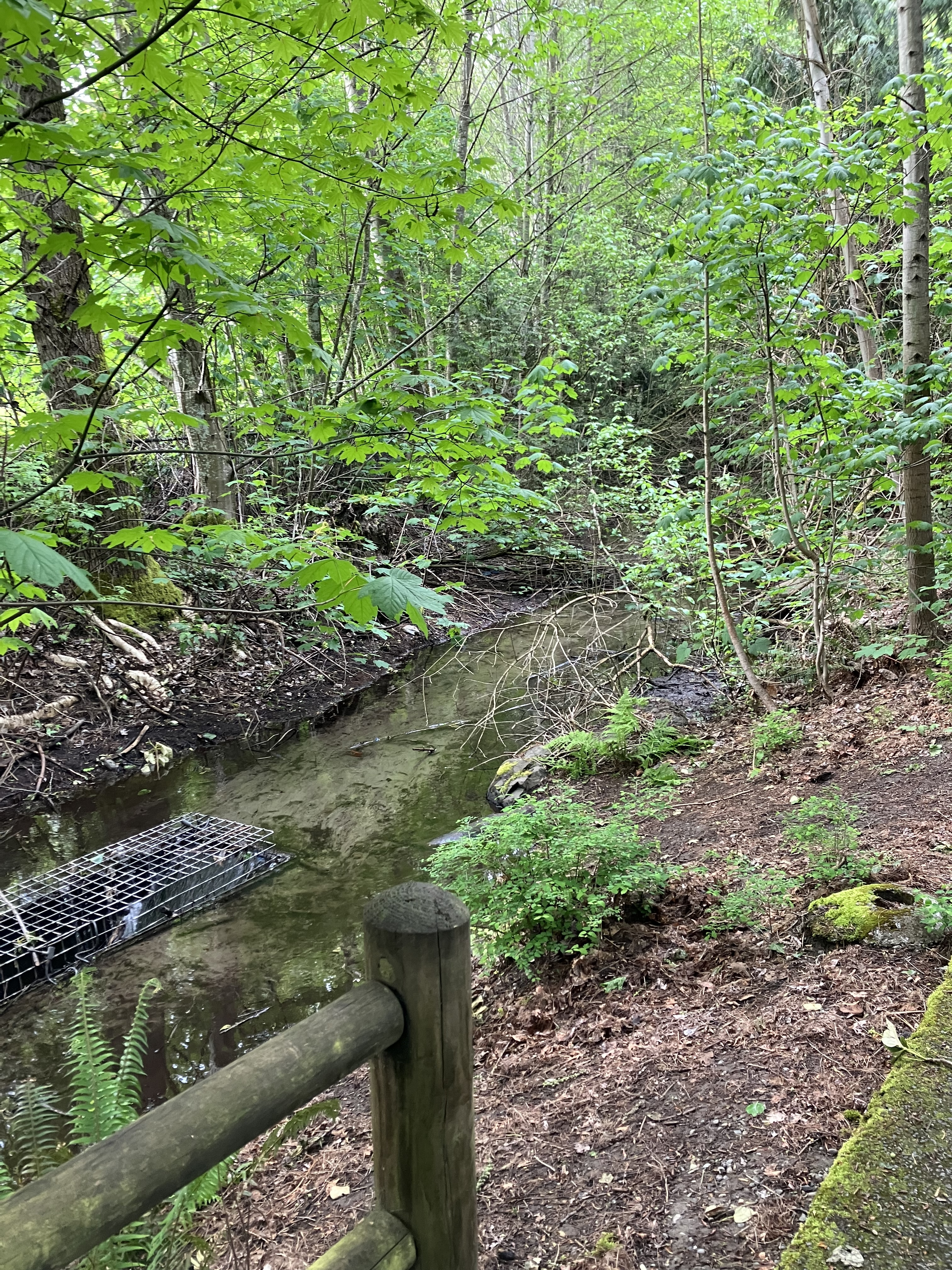
Daylighted creek at Recreation Fields, spring 2024

== See also ==
- Daylighting (streams)
- Stream
- Water resources
- List of rivers of Washington (state)
- Thornton Creek
- Yesler Creek
