= 20th Avenue NE Bridge =

Bridge in Seattle, Washington, U.S.

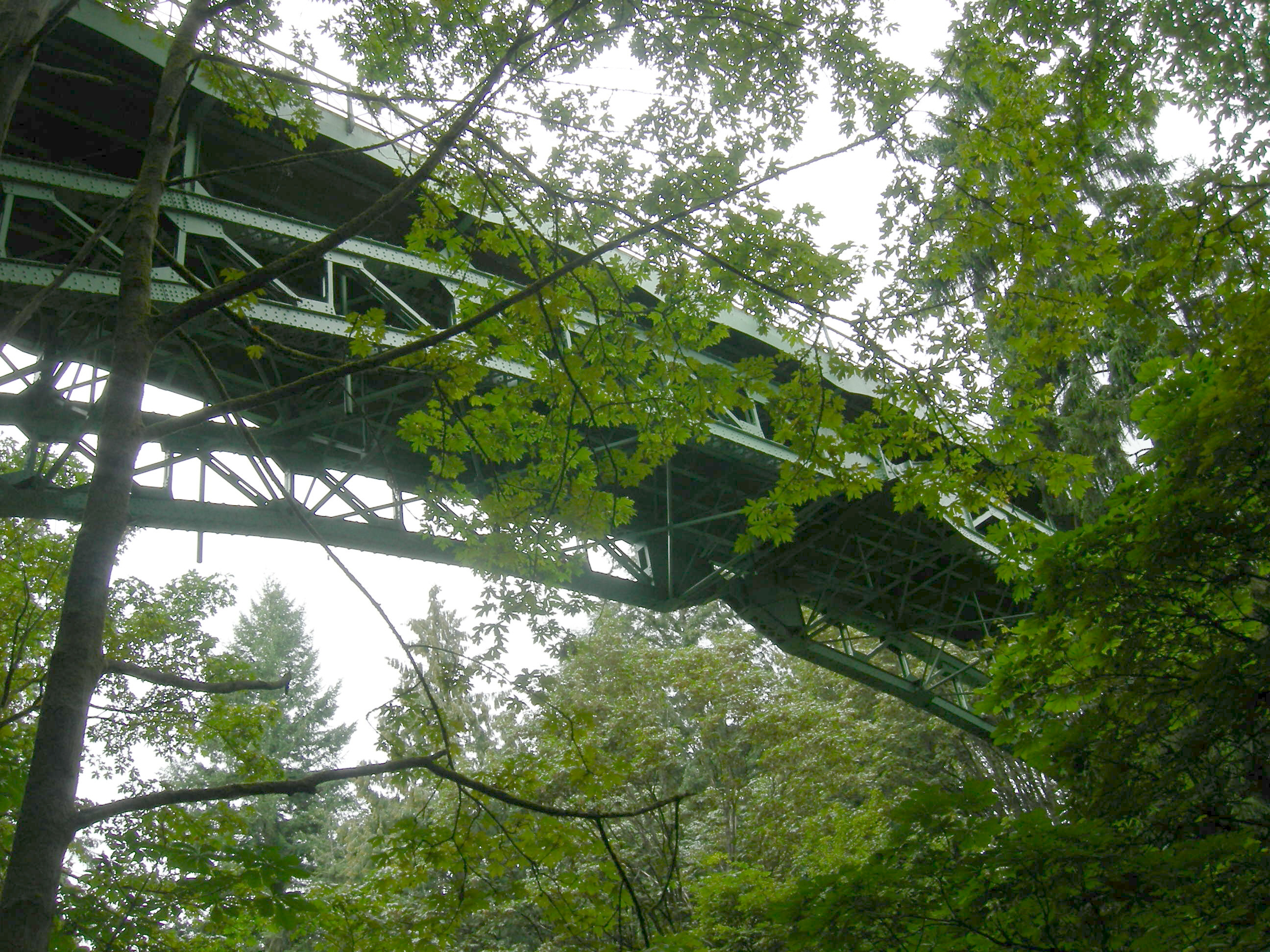
- Coordinates: 47°40′19″N 122°18′21″W
- Other name: Ravenna Park Bridge

Characteristics
- Design: Deck Arch
- Material: Steel
- Total length: 354 feet (108 m)
- Width: 23 feet (7.0 m)
- Height: 41.5 feet (12.6 m)
- Longest span: 250 feet (76 m)

History
- Designer: Frank M. Johnson
- Engineering design by: Arthur Dimock
- Construction cost: $55,000
- Opened: 1913
- Closed: 1975 (to vehicles only)
- Ravenna Park Bridge
- U.S. National Register of Historic Places
- Seattle Landmark
- Location: Seattle, Washington
- Built: 1913
- Architect: Frank M. Johnson and J.R. Wood & Co.
- MPS: Historic Bridges/Tunnels in Washington State TR
- NRHP reference No.: 82004246

Significant dates
- Added to NRHP: July 16, 1982
- Designated SEATL: January 17, 1977

Location
- Interactive map of 20th Avenue NE Bridge

The 20th Avenue NE Bridge (also known as the Ravenna Park Bridge) is a three-hinged, steel, lattice-arched bridge that spans a ravine in Seattle, Washington, United States' Ravenna Park. It was designed by Frank M. Johnson under the direction of city engineer Arthur Dimock. Built in 1913, the structure is both listed in the National Register of Historic Places and is a designated city landmark.

The structure is 354 ft (108 m) long. It has a 250 ft (76 m) arch with a rise of 41.5 ft (12.6 m) from its footings as the ravine floor drops further below. It supports an 18 ft (5.5 m) reinforced concrete roadway and a 5 ft (1.5 m) sidewalk. Beginning on March 11, 1975, a four-month trial began wherein the bridge was closed to vehicular traffic. The bridge did not meet the standards for arterial roads at the time, and upgrading the bridge would have been cost prohibitive. The trial period was successful and the bridge has been closed to vehicle travel ever since, but it is accessible by pedestrians and cyclists.

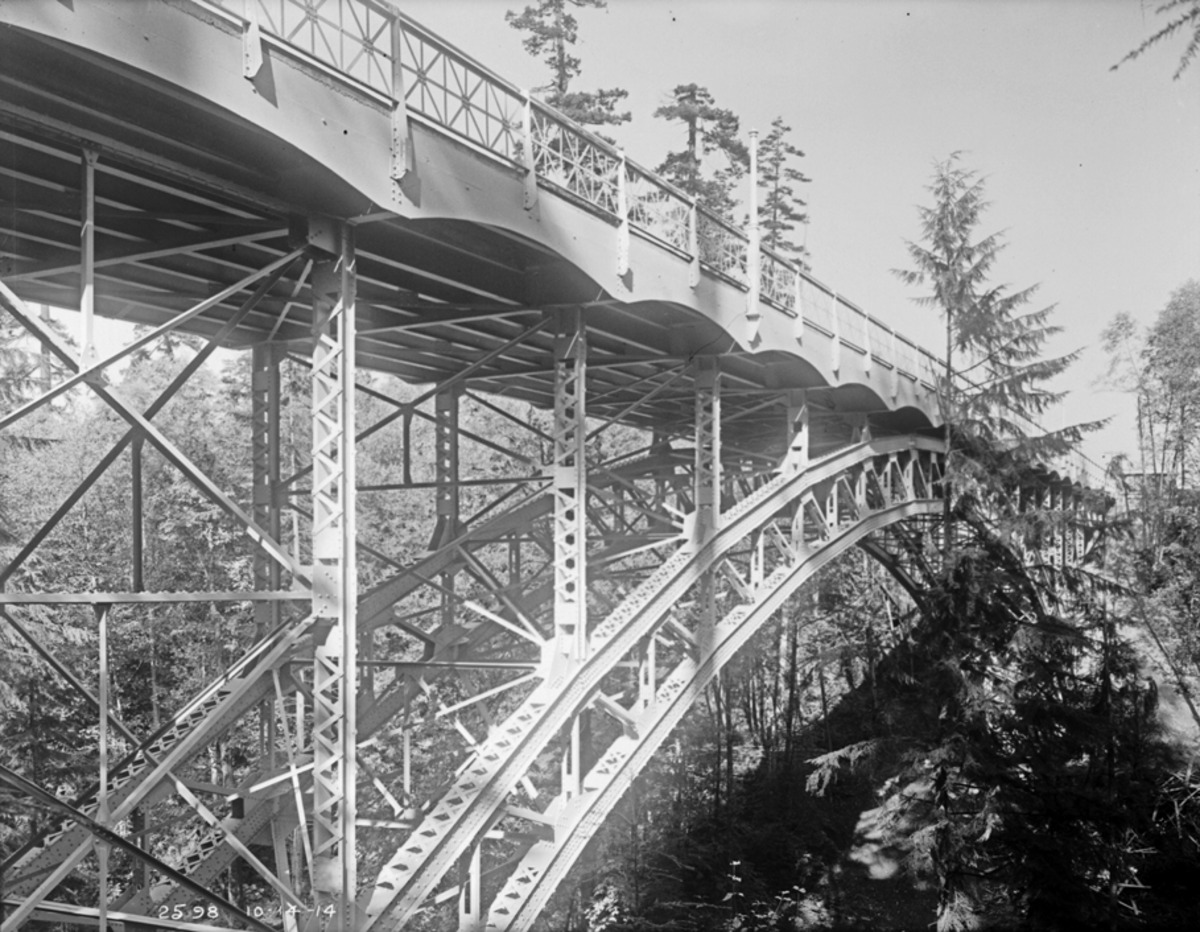
The newly constructed 20th Avenue NE Bridge (now known as Ravenna Park Bridge), Seattle, Washington, U.S., 1914. Originally a bridge for automobiles, it was eventually pedestrianized.

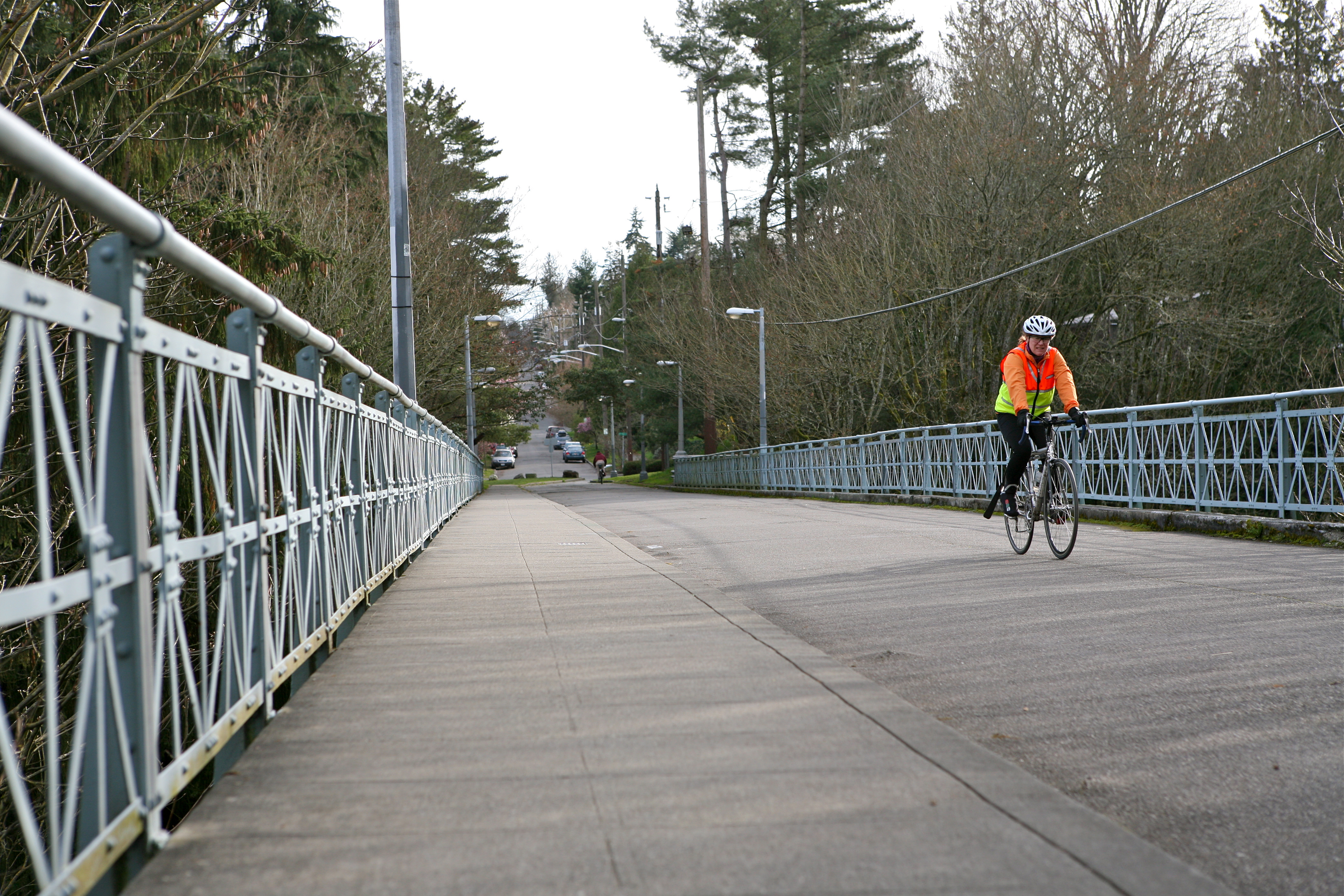
A person rides a bike over the 20th Avenue NE Bridge.
