= Ravenna, Seattle =

Ravenna
- Seattle neighborhood
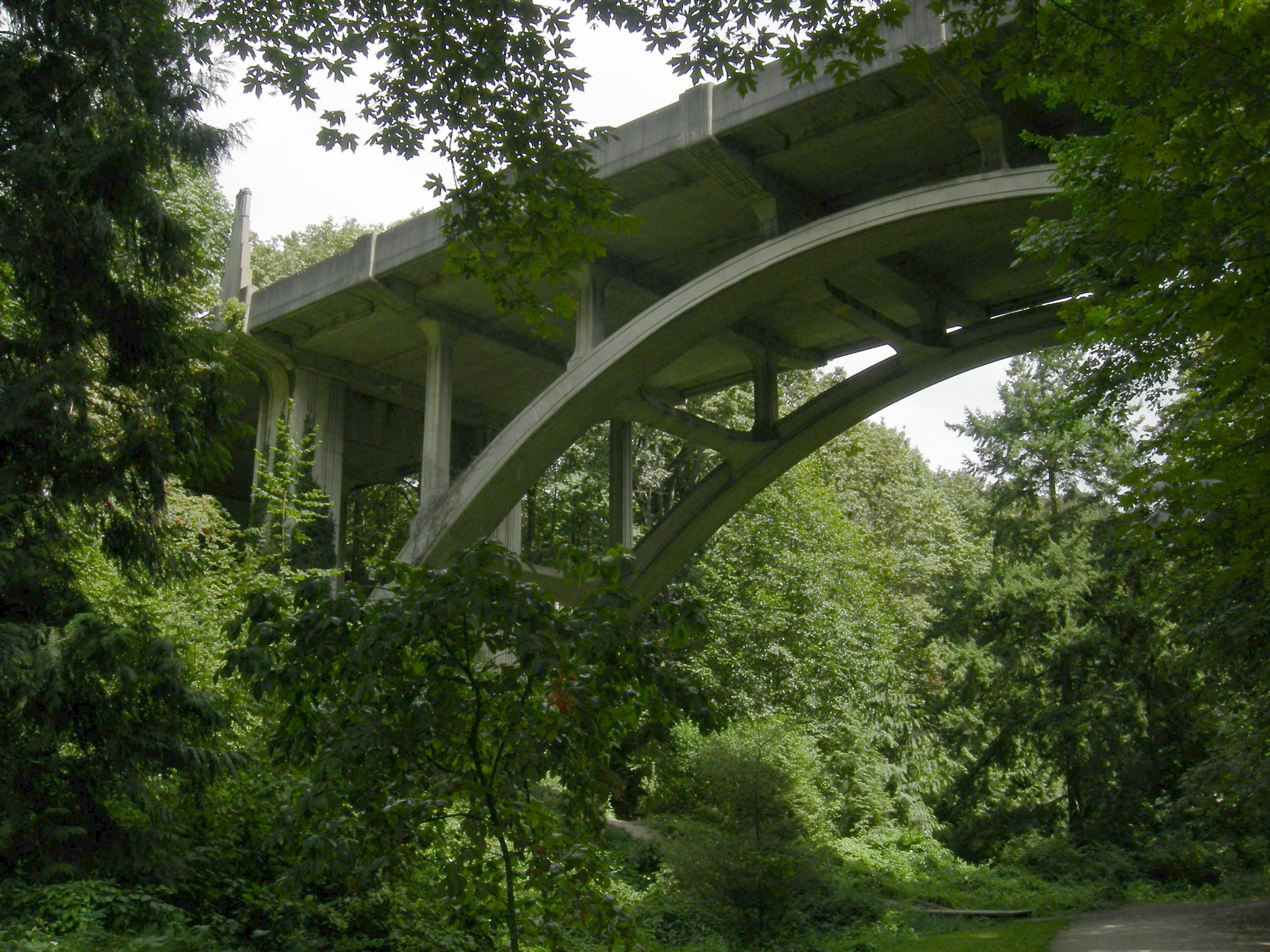
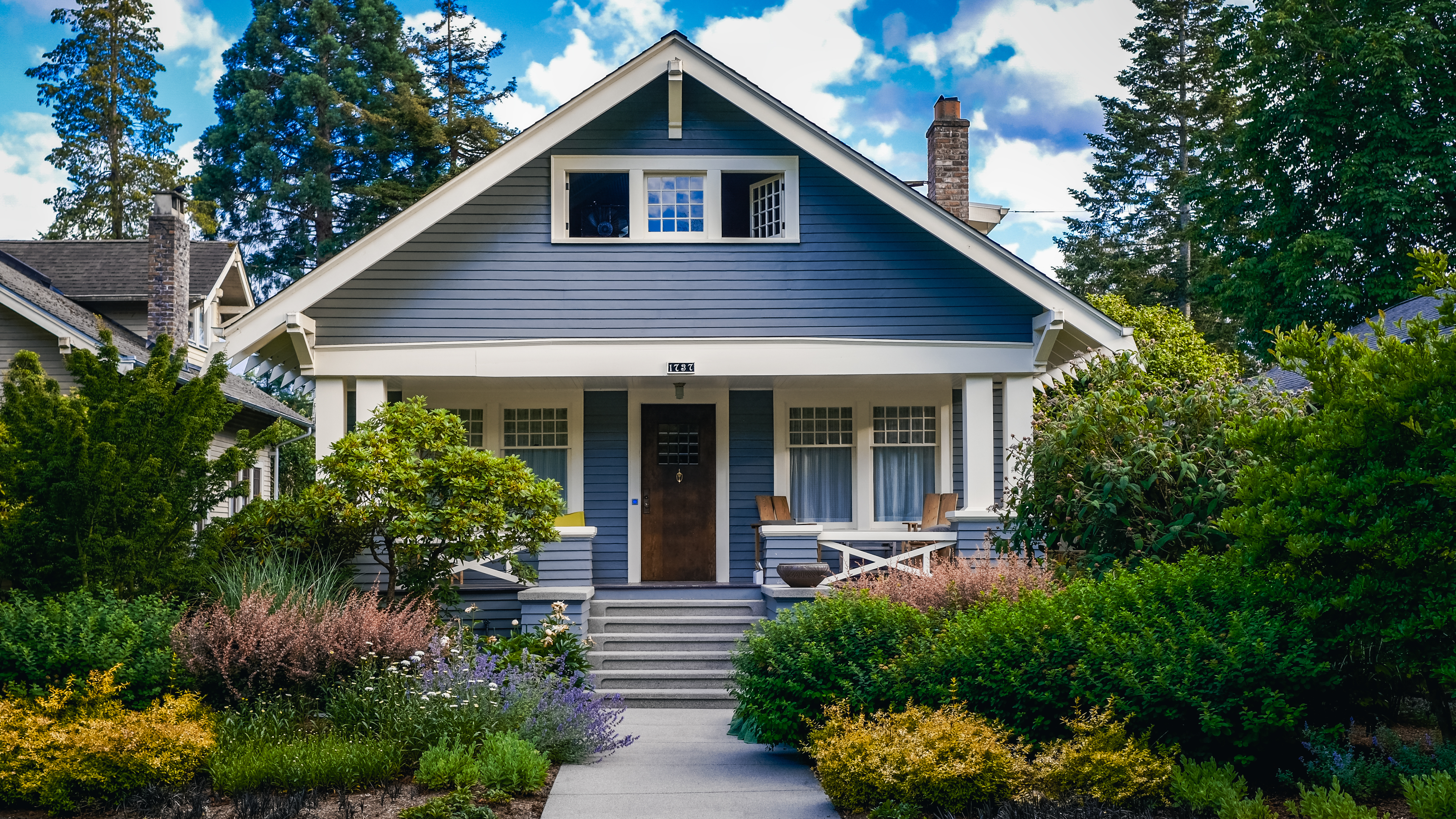
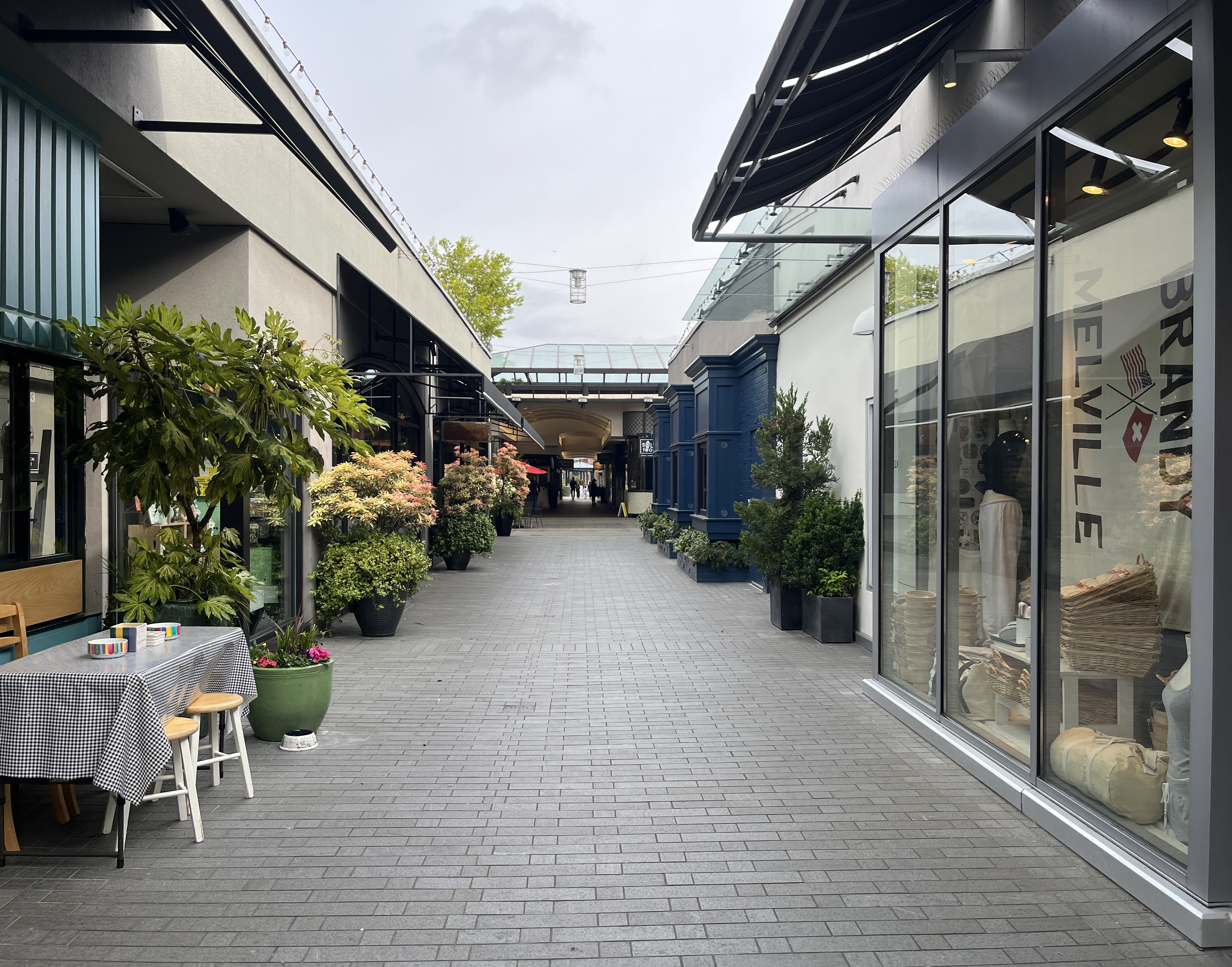
- Cowen Park Bridge Ravenna-Cowen North Historic District University Village

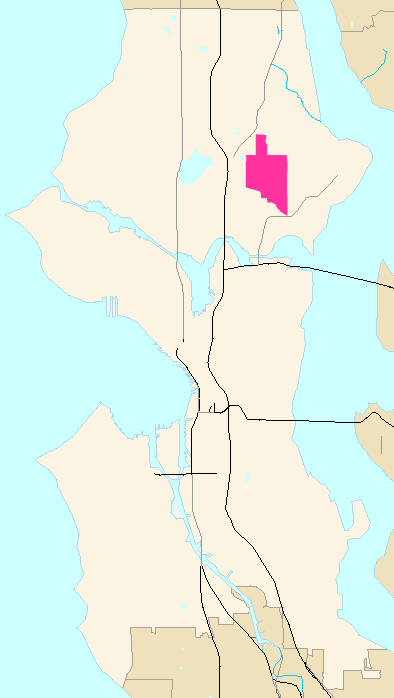
- Map of Ravenna's location in Seattle
- Coordinates: 47°40′35″N 122°18′07″W

Population (2023)(Ravenna-Bryant)
  - Total: 10,574

Ravenna is a neighborhood in northeastern Seattle, Washington named after Ravenna, Italy. Though Ravenna is considered a residential neighborhood, it also is home to several businesses, many of which are located in the University Village, a shopping mall.

Ravenna Park, located near University Village has a walking, biking, and running route that connects it to Green Lake and Burke–Gilman Trail, is located within the neighborhood.

== Ravenna and Ravenna-Bryant ==
Human habitation in what is now Ravenna dates to the end of the last glacial period (c. 8000 BCE). Before Euro‑American settlement, the land formed part of the homeland of the Duwamish—the Dkh^{w}’Duw’Absh (“People of the Inside”)—one of the Coast Salish nations. Their village of SWAH‑tsoo‑gweel (“portage”) stood on nearby Union Bay, while the forested wetland that became Ravenna served as a vital backyard and travel corridor.

=== Founding and early development (1880s–1900s) ===
The Burke–Gilman Trail follows the route of the Seattle, Lake Shore and Eastern Railway, which reached the district about 1886. In 1890, mining and real‑estate entrepreneur **William Wirt Beck** (1851–1944) platted roughly 400 acres with an eye to creating an ideal community modeled on Ravenna, Italy. That same year he opened the *Seattle Female College* in his home—still standing a few blocks east of today’s Ravenna Park—and helped launch the Ravenna Flouring Mill Company, which built King County’s first grist mill. Beck also preserved 70 acres of old‑growth timber in the ravine that became Ravenna Park.

A streetcar line began service in 1891 along 14th Avenue NE (now University Way NE), skirted the south edge of Ravenna Park, and connected the suburb to downtown Seattle. In 1903, the Olmsted Brothers incorporated Ravenna Boulevard into their citywide parks‑and‑boulevards plan, giving the neighborhood its signature diagonal greenway.

=== Annexation and land changes ===
Ravenna incorporated as a town in 1906 and was annexed by Seattle the following year. At annexation, the town limits stretched from 15th Avenue NE to 20th Avenue NE north of NE 65th Street and to 30th Avenue NE south of NE 65th, with NE 55th Street forming the southern edge.

After the 1916 opening of the Montlake Cut, Union Bay’s water level dropped, exposing mudflats that were progressively filled during the 1910s–1950s. The southernmost reclaimed land later hosted University Village, an open‑air shopping center that opened in 1956.

=== Boundaries ===
Modern Ravenna is bounded on the west by 15th and 20th Avenues NE, beyond which lies Roosevelt; on the north by NE 75th and 85th Streets, adjacent to Maple Leaf and Wedgwood; on the east by 25th and 35th Avenues NE, facing View Ridge, Windermere and Laurelhurst; and on the south by NE Ravenna Boulevard and NE Blakeley or NE 45th Streets, across from the University District and University Village. The neighboring area commonly called *Ravenna–Bryant* extends the eastern edge to 45th Avenue NE between NE 75th Street and Sand Point Way NE.

=== Transportation ===
The principal arterial through the neighborhood is 25th Avenue NE, while 15th and 35th Avenues NE and NE 65th Street function as minor arterials. NE 40th Avenue NE and NE 55th Street serve as collectors. NE Ravenna Boulevard is a signed local bikeway, and 20th Avenue NE has been closed to motor vehicles since 1975, creating a popular pedestrian and cycling route over the former 20th Avenue Bridge.

=== Community landmarks and events ===
Since 1951, residents of Park Road—locally famous as **Candy Cane Lane**—have mounted an elaborate December lights display, drawing bumper‑to‑bumper evening traffic. A corner grocery has operated on Ravenna Boulevard since the 1920s, while Queen Mary Tea Room (known for Victorian afternoon tea), the Duchess Tavern (established 1934), and Seattle’s only family‑owned Volvo dealership round out the neighborhood’s longstanding businesses.

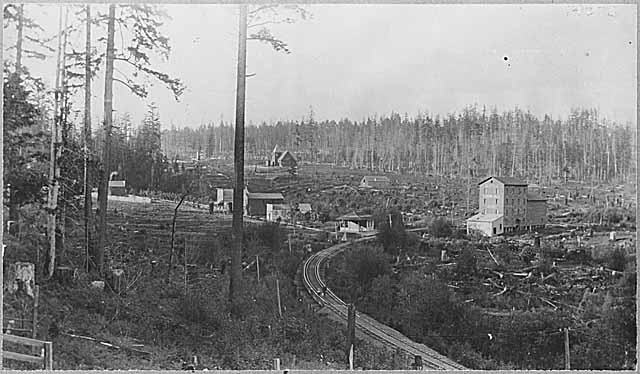
Seattle Lake Shore and Eastern Railway at the Ravenna Depot, near the Seattle Flouring Mill, c. 1893

The late‑19th‑century view above looks northeast across the depot (foreground center) toward the Seattle Female College on the hillside, with the Ravenna Flouring Mill in the foreground; several buildings shown, including the Phillips House, remain standing today.

== Ravenna-Cowen Park ==
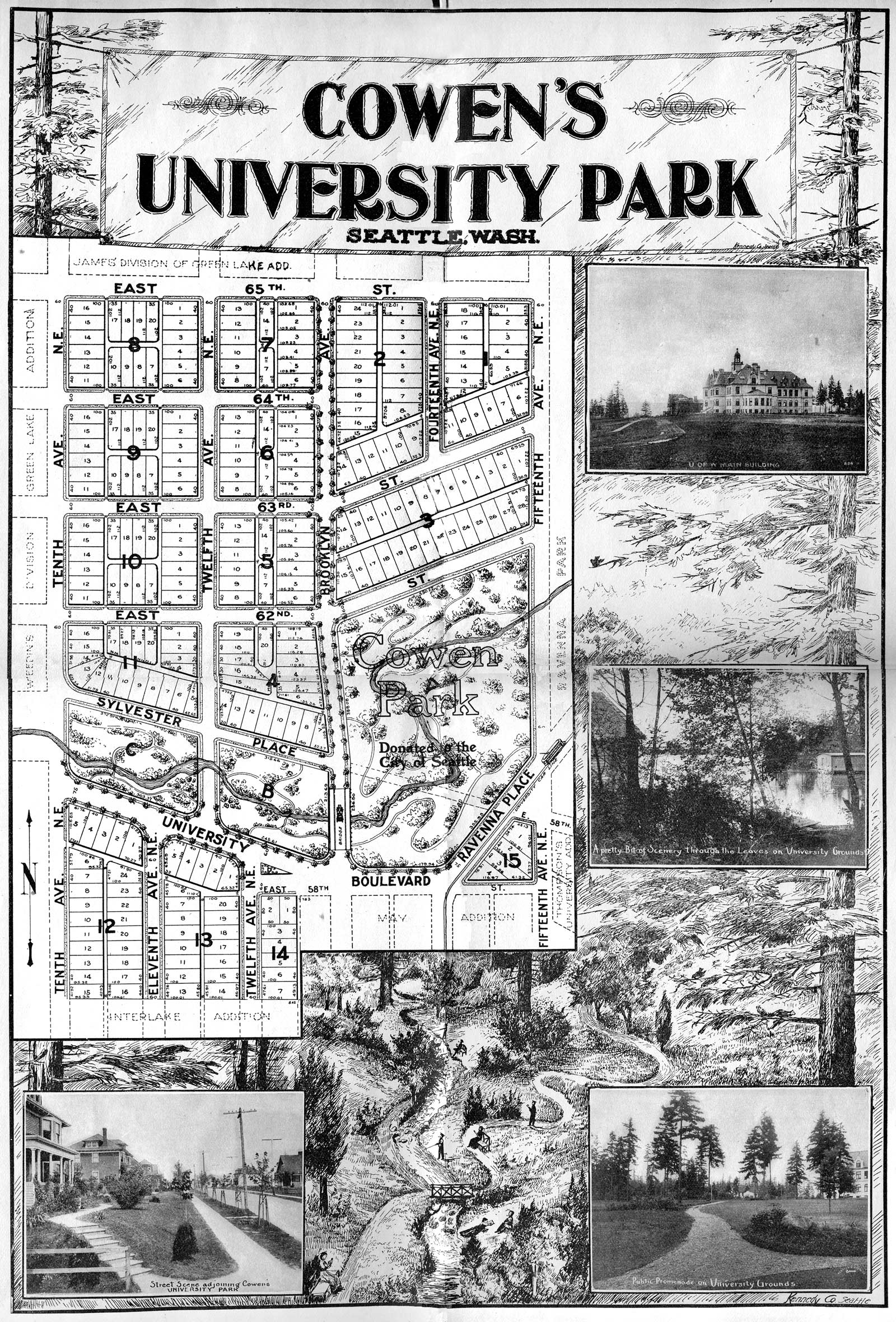
Map of Cowen's University Park Addition showing original course of Ravenna Creek

The conjoined Cowen Park and Ravenna Park is located at a southwest corner of Ravenna-Bryant, reaching from beyond the source of Ravenna Creek beside nearby Brooklyn Avenue and Ravenna Boulevard, under the 15th Avenue bridge to 25th Avenue NE. The parks comprise the centerpiece of the neighborhood.

For many decades of Seattle city history, the park ravine had been ignored by loggers and farmers and still possessed full old-growth timber rising nearly 400 feet. The trees remained through the Alaska–Yukon–Pacific Exposition of 1908, at which they were featured exhibitions. Public controversy about them declined after their gradual disappearance in suspicious circumstances by 1926. Today, none of that size remain anywhere in the world. The legacy helped save Seward and Carkeek parks, and helped galvanize conservation efforts ever since. Today, a single Sierra Redwood stands over the Medicinal Herb Garden at a south edge of the UW campus, at 106 feet somewhat over a quarter of the height of those of Cowen Park-Ravenna Park.

=== Ravenna Creek ===
Projects have included daylighting portions of the creek (partly with the goal of restoring native fish runs), building and maintaining trails, and restoring riparian habitat, sometimes in collaboration with the University of Washington's environmental science program. Completion of downstream daylighting to the mouth of the creek beside Union Bay Natural Area and restoration of migrating fish has come into conflict with property owners, specifically the owners of University Village, even though a revised daylighting project would not include their land.

== See also ==
- Ravenna-Cowen North Historic District

== Bibliography ==
- Dorpat, Paul (1981). 294 Glimpses of Historic Seattle, Its Neighborhoods and Neighborhood Businesses. Seattle: P. Dorpat (Mayor's Small Business Task Force).
- "About the Seattle City Clerk's On-line Information Services". Seattle City Clerk's Office. April 3, 2006. — see heading "Note about limitations of these data".
- "Area 4". Seattle City Clerk's Neighborhood Map Atlas. June 1, 2002.
- "Bryant". Seattle City Clerk's Neighborhood Map Atlas. June 1, 2002. — maps NN‑1030S & NN‑1040S dated 17 June 2002.
- "Chronology". Ravenna Creek Alliance. August 1998. Archived from the original on December 20, 2004.
- Dailey, Tom. "Duwamish–Seattle". CoastSalishMap.org. — links to "Village Descriptions Duwamish-Seattle"; cites Waterman, Buerge, Smith, etc.
- Dolan, Maria; True, Kathryn (2003). Nature in the City: Seattle. Seattle: Mountaineers Books. pp. 142–143. ISBN 0-89886-879-3.
- Study: 20th Avenue N.E. Bridge Closure (Report). Seattle Engineering Department. 1975.
- Dorpat, Paul (1994). "42". Seattle, Now & Then (2nd ed., vol. 1). Seattle: Tartu Publications. ISBN 0-9614357-0-4.
- Dorpat, Paul (June 18, 2001). "Seattle Neighborhoods: University District — Thumbnail History". HistoryLink. — draws on Dorpat & Crowley, Crowley *Rites of Passage*, and other U-District histories.
- Hadley, Jane (June 1, 1986). "Protest Nearly Buries Storm-Water Project: A Ravenna Park Pipeline Probably Won't Be Built". Seattle Post-Intelligencer. p. A9.
- Heather (August 2001). "Tea Time". Georgian Index. Archived from the original on April 22, 2006.
- Higgins, Mark (December 6, 1997). "Area Is Quintessential Seattle". Seattle Post-Intelligencer.
- Higgins, Mark (July 3, 1999). "Traffic Wars Just Latest Fight for Activist Neighborhood". Neighbors Project.
- Higgins, Mark (December 6, 1997). "Residents Rally to Save Creek". Neighbors Project.
- "Olmsted Park Plans Cybertour". HistoryLink. 2003. Archived from the original on March 1, 2017.
- "History @ UBNA". Center for Urban Horticulture, University of Washington. 1999. Archived from the original on May 17, 2006.
- Hook, Jamie (November 2, 2000). "Obsession & Lights, True Story Of". The Stranger. Archived from the original on April 22, 2018.
- * Lund, Abby (March 1, 2006). "Not Just Another Neighborhood Grocery Store — Boulevard Grocery Finds Its Niche After Decades in Ravenna". North Seattle Herald-Outlook. Archived from the original on February 1, 2025.
- O'Neil, Kit. "Ravenna Creek Daylighting Project". University Community Urban Center. Archived from the original on August 31, 2005.
- Paajanen, Sean. "High Tea vs. Afternoon Tea". About.com (Coffee/Tea). Archived from the original on August 3, 2004.
- Phelps, Myra L. (1978). Public Works in Seattle. Seattle: Seattle Engineering Department. ISBN 0-9601928-1-6.
- "Planned Arterials Map Legend Definitions" (PDF). Seattle Department of Transportation. January 1, 2004. Archived from the original (PDF) on January 17, 2006.
- "Street Classification Maps". Seattle Department of Transportation. 2005. Archived from the original on June 14, 2006. — high-, medium-, and low-resolution PDFs available.
- "Ravenna". Seattle City Clerk's Neighborhood Map Atlas. June 1, 2002. — note caveat in footer.
- * "Ravenna Creek Alliance: Specific Info". Ravenna Creek Alliance. November 9, 2005. Archived from the original on April 7, 2005.
- "Seattle's Urban Trail System, January 2004". Seattle DOT Bicycle Program. 2005. Archived from the original on March 16, 2006.
- Van Pelt, Robert (2001). Forest Giants of the Pacific Coast. Vancouver/San Francisco: Global Forest Society / University of Washington Press. pp. xxii, 181–191. ISBN 0-295-98140-7.
- Whittemore, Thomas. "Measure Water-Quality Parameters". Science Service Learning. University of Washington Chemistry Department.
- Wilma, David (August 2, 2001). "Seattle Neighborhoods: Ravenna–Roosevelt — Thumbnail History". HistoryLink.
