= Roosevelt, Seattle =

Roosevelt
- Neighborhood
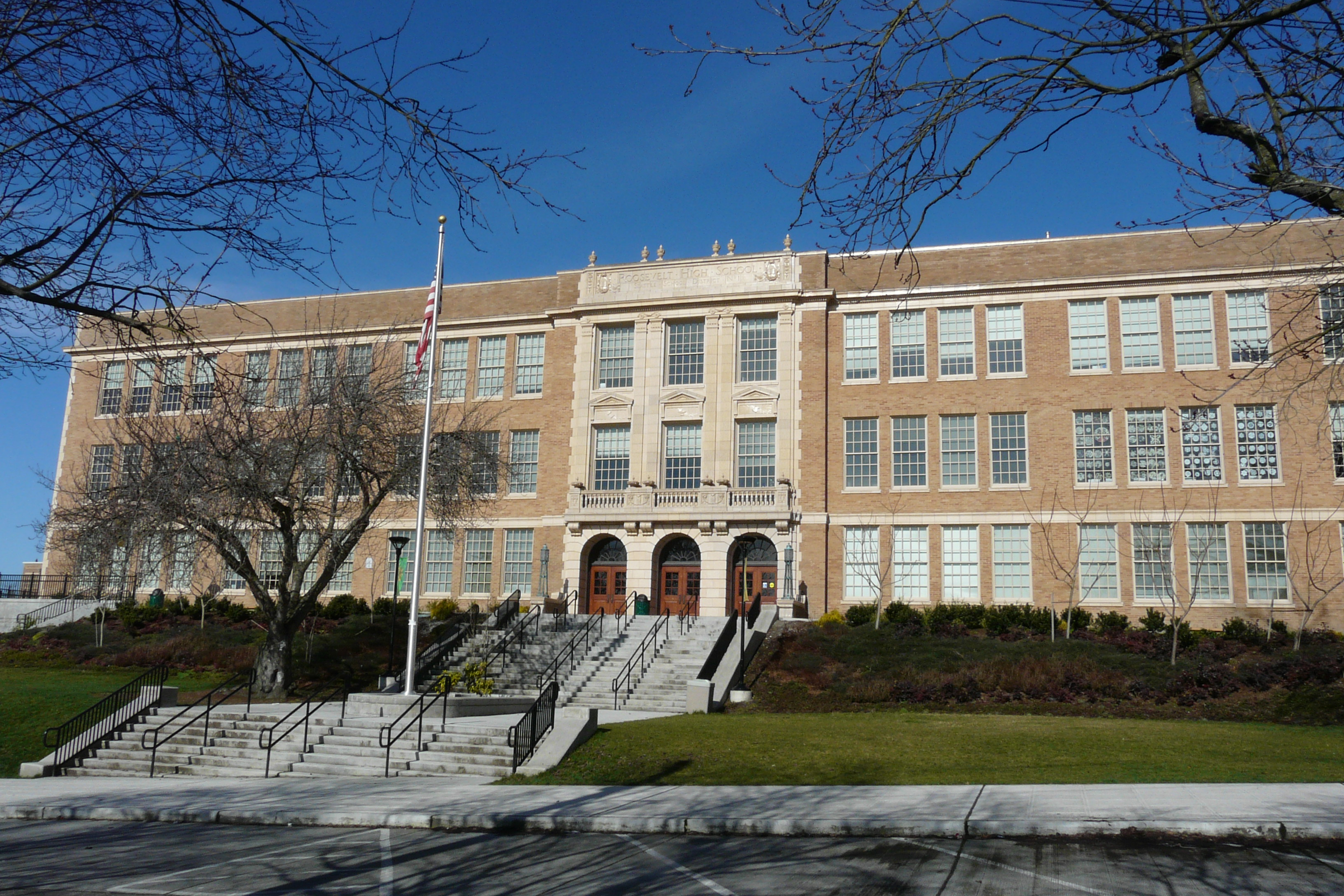
- Roosevelt High School

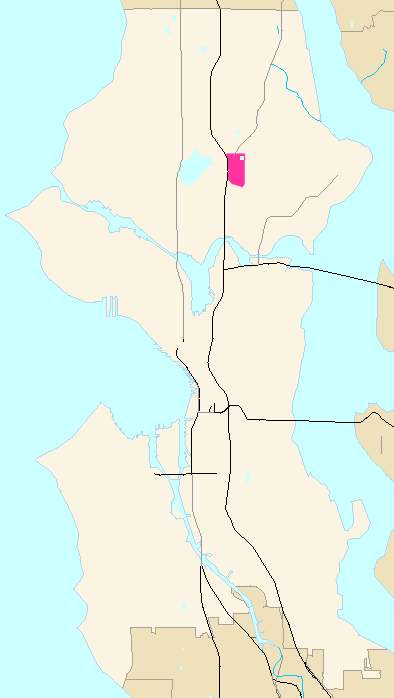
- General location of Roosevelt (highlighted in pink) within Seattle
- Coordinates: 47°40′41″N 122°18′55″W
- Country: United States
- State: Washington
- County: King
- City: Seattle
- Named for: Theodore Roosevelt
- ZIP Code: 98115
- Area code: 206, 564

Roosevelt is a neighborhood in northern Seattle, Washington. Its main thoroughfare, originally 10th Avenue, was renamed Roosevelt Way upon Theodore Roosevelt's death in 1919. The neighborhood received the name as the result of a Community Club contest held eight years later, in 1927.

Roosevelt's principal and minor arterials are the one-way pair Roosevelt Way (southbound) and 12th Avenue NE (northbound), Lake City Way (SR 522) and 15th Avenue NE, and NE 65th and 75th Streets. City streets are laid out and designated in a pattern; see street layout of Seattle, directionals.

The boundaries of the neighborhood are Interstate 5 to the west, beyond which lies Green Lake; NE Ravenna Boulevard and NE 60th Street to the south, beyond which is the University District; 15th Avenue NE to the east, beyond which is Ravenna; and Lake City Way (SR 522) to the north, beyond which lies Maple Leaf.

== History ==
The Roosevelt neighborhood was annexed to Seattle in 1891, but development remained sparse until the early 20th century. In its early years, the area was informally called the "Hollywood District", but it was officially renamed Roosevelt in honor of President Theodore Roosevelt. After Roosevelt's death in 1919, Seattle renamed 10th Avenue NE as Roosevelt Way NE, and the new high school (opened 1922) was dedicated as Roosevelt High School. A community club–sponsored contest in 1927 then adopted “Roosevelt” as the neighborhood's name, replacing the Hollywood moniker. Notably, Ravenna Park was also briefly renamed "Roosevelt Park" from 1919 to 1931, until local protests restored the original name.

During the 1920s, Roosevelt developed rapidly into a busy residential and commercial district. A thriving business strip grew along Roosevelt Way NE as the automobile age arrived. The Hollywood Theater opened in 1923 at NE 66th Street, amid this period of “tremendous growth” in the area. On January 1, 1928, Sears, Roebuck & Co. opened a North Seattle department store at Roosevelt Way and NE 65th Street, anchoring the retail core. This Sears store operated for the next 52 years. By the end of the 1920s, most of the neighborhood's present single‑family homes and low‑rise buildings had been constructed.

Following World War II, the neighborhood's population and housing density increased as University of Washington faculty, staff, and students settled in Roosevelt. The construction of Interstate 5 in the early 1960s cut along Roosevelt's western edge, establishing a firm boundary with the Green Lake area. Traditional retail shifted in the late 20th century: the Roosevelt Way Sears store closed in January 1980, and its building was later redeveloped as the Roosevelt Square shopping center. By the 1970s–1990s, the business district took on an eclectic character, including a cluster of alternative bookstores and holistic health shops that a local writer dubbed Seattle's "Metaphysical Belt."

In the early 21st century, major planning efforts and infrastructure projects brought significant changes. In the 2000s, Roosevelt community activists—embracing a "Yes In My Front Yard" (YIMFY) motto—successfully lobbied Sound Transit to site a planned light rail station in the neighborhood's center (near Roosevelt High School) rather than alongside I‑5. To prepare for transit‑oriented growth, the Seattle City Council approved a comprehensive rezoning of Roosevelt in January 2012, allowing mid‑rise buildings up to about 65 feet (6 stories) near the future station. While many residents supported the light‑rail project, some advocated lower height limits to preserve sight‑lines of the high school's historic façade.

== Schools ==
The Roosevelt district is also home to Roosevelt High School (RHS, opened 1922), one of the older schools in the Seattle Public Schools District. Like the street, it is named after Teddy, not Franklin D. Roosevelt. For many years, Roosevelt High School and Garfield High School juggled the lead in the school district in many academic and sports fields. Alumni include Mark Pattison, who played football for the University of Washington Huskies and was drafted in the seventh round in 1985 by the Oakland Raiders of the NFL, actress Rose McGowan (who also attended Nova), and Nobel laureates Linda B. Buck and Robert Lucas Jr.

== Shops ==
Although primarily a residential neighborhood, the Roosevelt district had a Sears department store from 1928 to 1980. After its closure, the land was redeveloped as Roosevelt Square, which now features supermarket Whole Foods Market and a Mud Bay pet store among other businesses. A block beyond Roosevelt Way to the west is the longest-established vegetarian restaurant in Seattle, independent Sunlight Cafe, nearly as old (1978) as Starbucks. Numerous other small businesses still line 65th Street and Roosevelt Way. Teddy's is a multi-generational, multi-subculture popular biker bar. Roosevelt Way from 62nd Street north to 64th was somewhat of an "audio row", having featured a concentration of stores selling high-end audio and video systems and components. Today, only two such stores remain.

== Parks ==
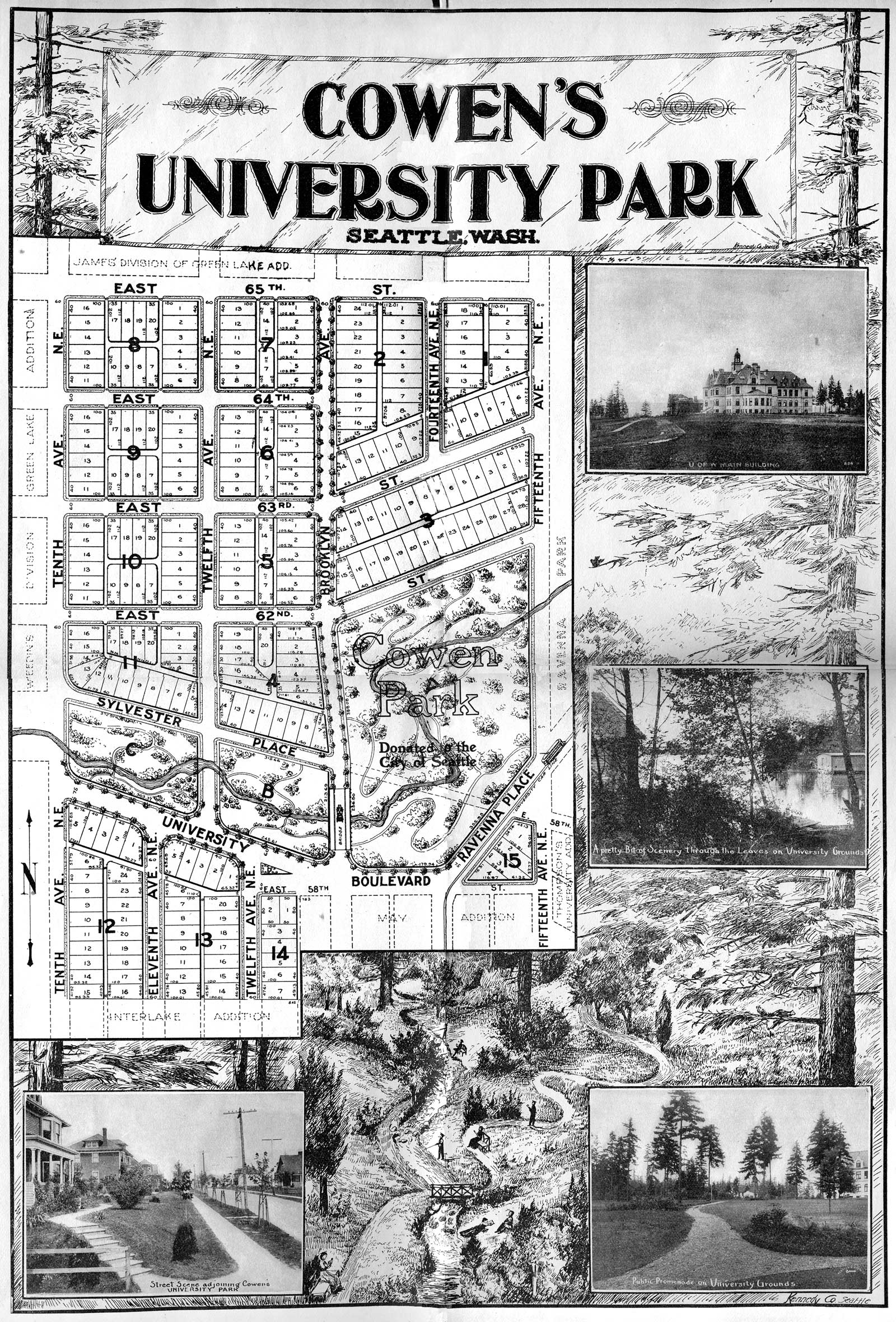
Map of Cowen's University Park Addition, southeast corner of present-day Roosevelt, showing original course of Ravenna Creek

The neighborhood includes two parks: Cowen Park, in the southeast corner (contiguous with the larger Ravenna Park of Ravenna); and Froula Playground, in the northeast corner, adjacent to the Green Lake Reservoir. The source of Ravenna Creek has been reduced to Cowen Park; since completion of the partial daylighting in 2006, the creek has been reconnected to Lake Washington.

== Transportation ==
The underground Roosevelt Station opened for service on October 2, 2021, at NE 65th Street and 12th Avenue NE. The new Link light rail connection quickly accelerated redevelopment in the surrounding blocks. Between 2016 and 2021—the five‑year period leading up to the station’s opening—the Roosevelt urban village saw an estimated 1,626 new housing units built, a 95 percent increase in the neighborhood’s housing stock. Older single‑family houses and low‑rise structures near the station have been replaced by mid‑rise apartment buildings, new shops, and public amenities in a wave of transit‑oriented development. Sound Transit and local preservationists also collaborated to retain elements of neighborhood history: the façade of a 1947 Art‑Deco Standard Radio building was preserved and integrated into the new station design.

== See also ==
- Neighborhoods of Ravenna Creek

== Bibliography ==
- "About the Seattle City Clerk's On-line Information Services". Information Services. Seattle City Clerk's Office. 2006.
- "About Us". Roosevelt Neighborhood Association (RNA). Roosevelt Neighborhood Seattle. n.d.
- "The Bank of Sweden Prize in Economic Sciences in Memory of Alfred Nobel 1995". Nobelprize.org. 2005.
  Economics > Laureates > Robert E. Lucas.
- "Company Timeline: February 2006" (PDF). 2006. Archived from the original (PDF) on August 10, 2007.
  PDF at "The Company: What We Are All About"
- Eibel, E. (2000). "Sunlight Cafe: Seattle's Venerable Vegetarian Institution". Cheap Eats.
  Howe > Restaurants > Vegetarian.
- Lucas, Robert E. (1996). "Robert E. Lucas, Jr. – Autobiography". Seattle Parks and Recreation. Archived from the original on May 7, 2006.
  From Frängsmyr, Tore, ed. (1996). Les Prix Nobel: The Nobel Prizes 1995. Stockholm: Nobel Foundation.
- "The Nobel Prize in Physiology or Medicine 2004". Nobelprize.org. 2004.
- "Street Classification Maps". Seattle Department of Transportation. 2005. Archived from the original on June 14, 2006.
  High-Resolution Version, PDF format, 16.1 MB
  Medium-Resolution Version, PDF format, 1.45 MB, January 12, 2004
  Low-Resolution Version, PDF format, 825 KB, January 12, 2004
  Planned Arterials Map Legend Definitions, PDF format, January 12, 2004.
- "Roosevelt". Seattle City Clerk's Neighborhood Map Atlas. 2002.
  "NN-1030S", "NN-1040S".jpg dated June 17, 2002.
- Warren, James R. (2004) [1999]. "Bartell, George H. Sr. (1868-1956)". Seattle Parks and Recreation.
- Wilma, David (2001). "Seattle Neighborhoods: Ravenna - Roosevelt – Thumbnail History". HistoryLink.org Essay 3502.
- Wilma, David (2002). "Seattle voters reject a city manager and district elections on June 30, 1914". HistoryLink.org Essay 3761.
- Wilma, David (2003). "Seattle voters reject district elections for city council on November 7, 1995". HistoryLink.org Essay 4246.
- Sound Transit webpage on future light rail station in Roosevelt
