= Yesler Creek =

River in Washington, United States

Coordinates: 47°39′25″N 122°17′17″W

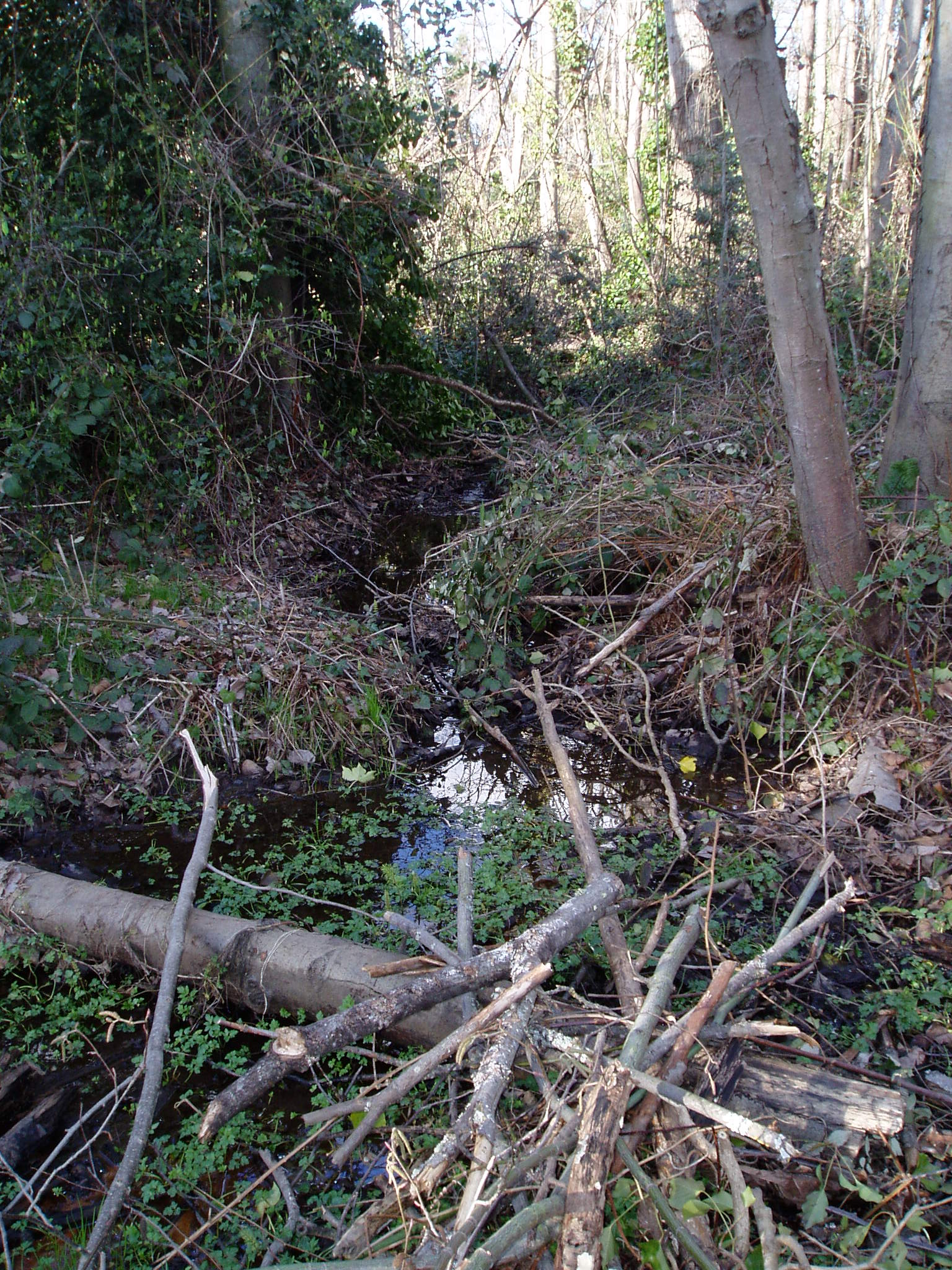
Near the headwaters of Yesler Creek.

Yesler Creek is a stream that originates in the Bryant and Wedgwood neighborhoods of Seattle, Washington, and flows southward to empty into Union Bay of Lake Washington. Portions are daylighted, such as those flowing between 39th and 40th Avenue NE and through Burke Gilman Park. The stream also continues underground underneath Seattle Children's Hospital.

== Restoration ==
Members of the Green Seattle Partnership and the University of Washington Restoration Ecology Network (UW-REN) have conducted work parties to mulch, clear invasive plants and plant native vegetation around the stream in Burke Gilman Park.

== See also ==
- Ravenna Creek
- Thornton Creek
