= Montlake Historic District =

Historic district in Washington, United States

- U.S. National Register of Historic Places
- U.S. Historic district
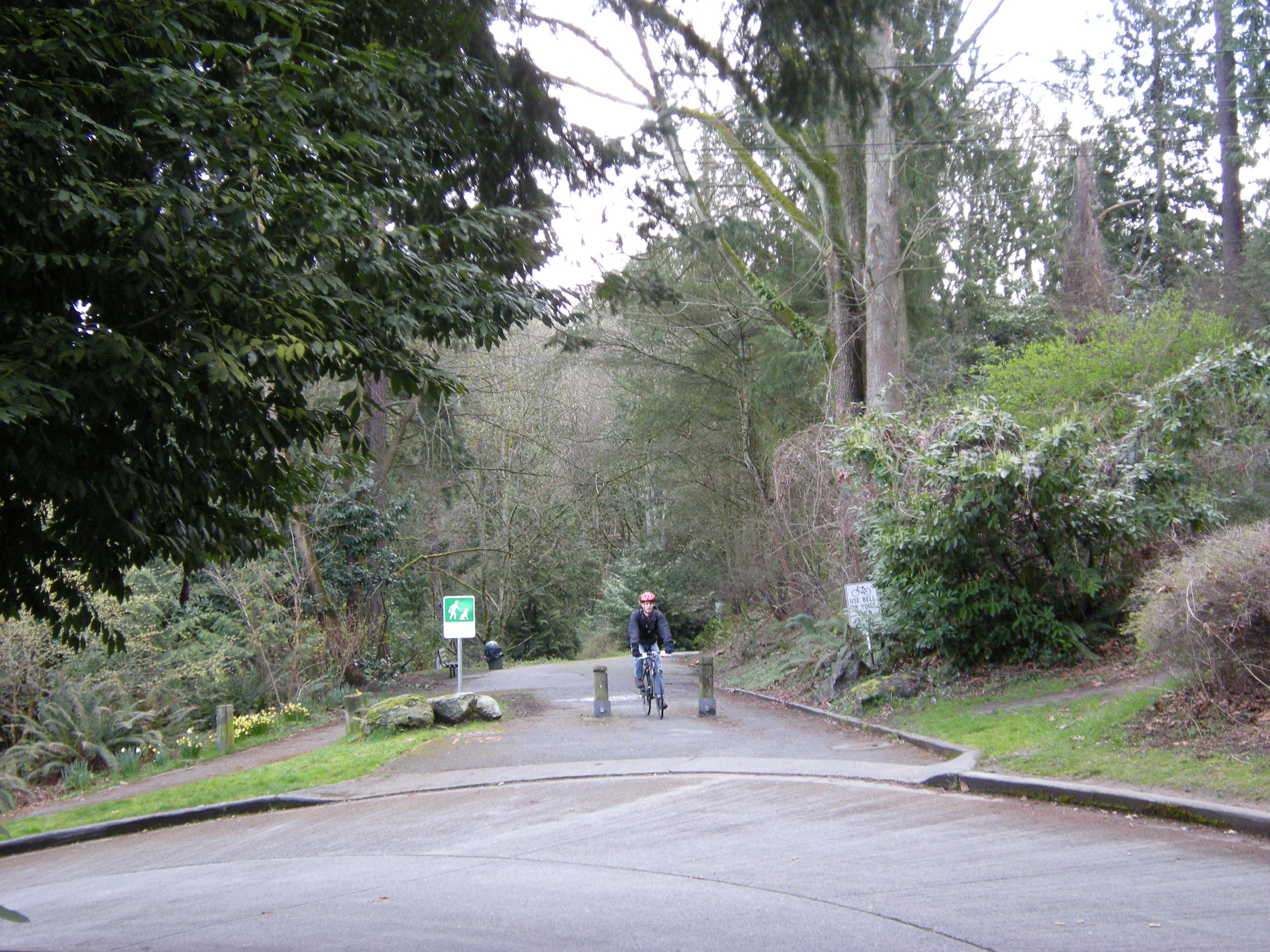
- Location: from the Washington Park Arboretum west to Portage Bay/15th Avenue E., from the Montlake Cut in the north to Interlaken Park at its south end, Seattle, Washington
- Coordinates: 47.641°N 122.304°W
- Area: 50 city blocks
- Built: 1905–1959
- Architectural style: Craftsman, Colonial Revival, Tudor, vernacular
- NRHP reference No.: 15000499
- Added to NRHP: October 15, 2015

The Montlake Historic District is a part of Montlake, located northeast of the downtown district in Seattle, Washington that has been listed on the National Register of Historic Places since October 15, 2015. It primarily contains residential property. However, there are some other types of buildings within the district such as the Northwest Fisheries Science Center of the National Marine Fisheries Service and the Seattle Yacht Club.

It is notable for the architectural styles displayed by homes in the district and the boulevards planned by the Olmsted Brothers in 1903. Architectural styles include Craftsman, Colonial Revival, and Tudor Revival, and vernacular. Most were built between 1905 and 1959, with construction reaching a peak in the 1920s. Construction of the district was spurred by the Olmsted plan as well as the 1909 Alaska–Yukon–Pacific Exposition. Montlake Boulevard, a portion of Lake Washington Boulevard, East Montlake Park, West Montlake Park, Montlake Playfield, Boyer Pocket Park, and the Lake Washington Canal Reserve Land are all parks within the district. The State Route 520 corridor which divides the district into two sections (the northern section of the historic district only has two blocks out of a total of 50) is excluded from the district.

== See also ==
- Seattle Parks and Recreation
