= McCurdy Park =

Park in Seattle, Washington, U.S.

Coordinates: 47.6448°N 122.3015°W

- Interactive map of McCurdy Park
- Location: Montlake, United States

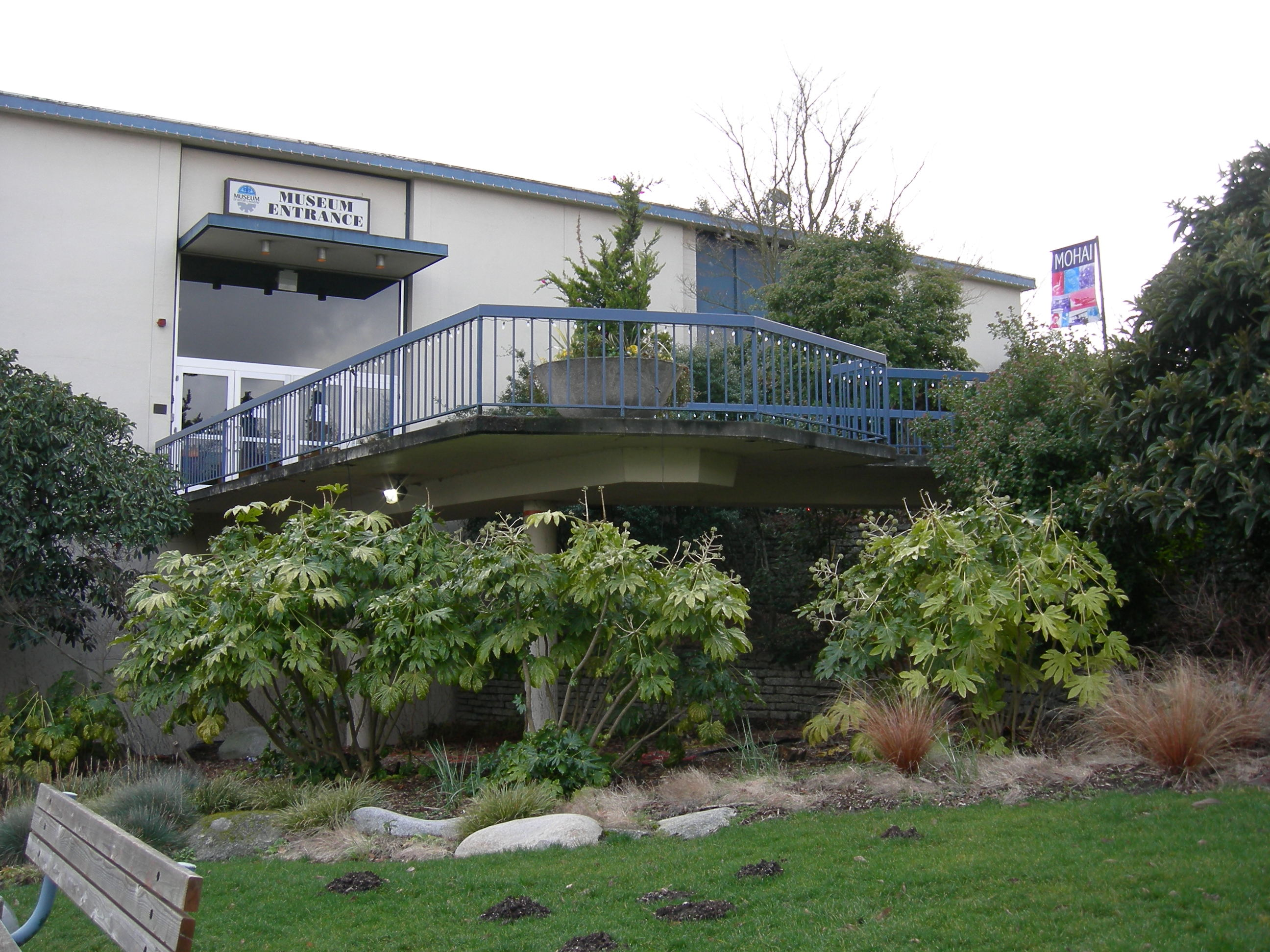
The Museum of History and Industry in McCurdy Park. Closed 2012, demolished 2015.

McCurdy Park was a 1.5-acre (6,100 m^{2}) park in the Montlake neighborhood of the U.S. city of Seattle, Washington. Formerly home to the Museum of History and Industry, it was effectively bounded on the west by the museum and East Montlake Park, on the south by State Route 520, on the east by the Washington Park Arboretum, and on the north by Union Bay marshland. However, there was no obvious demarcation between McCurdy Park, East Montlake Park, and the Arboretum.

McCurdy Park no longer exists because of the land's use a staging area for the construction of the Evergreen Point Floating Bridge replacement.
