= Broadmoor, Seattle =

Gated residential community in Seattle

Coordinates: 47°38′09″N 122°17′22″W

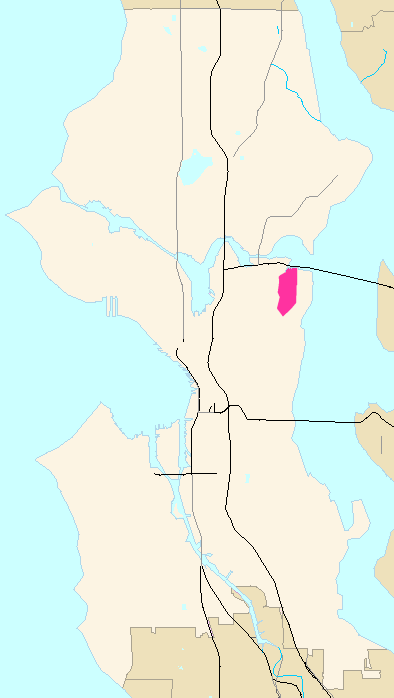
Broadmoor

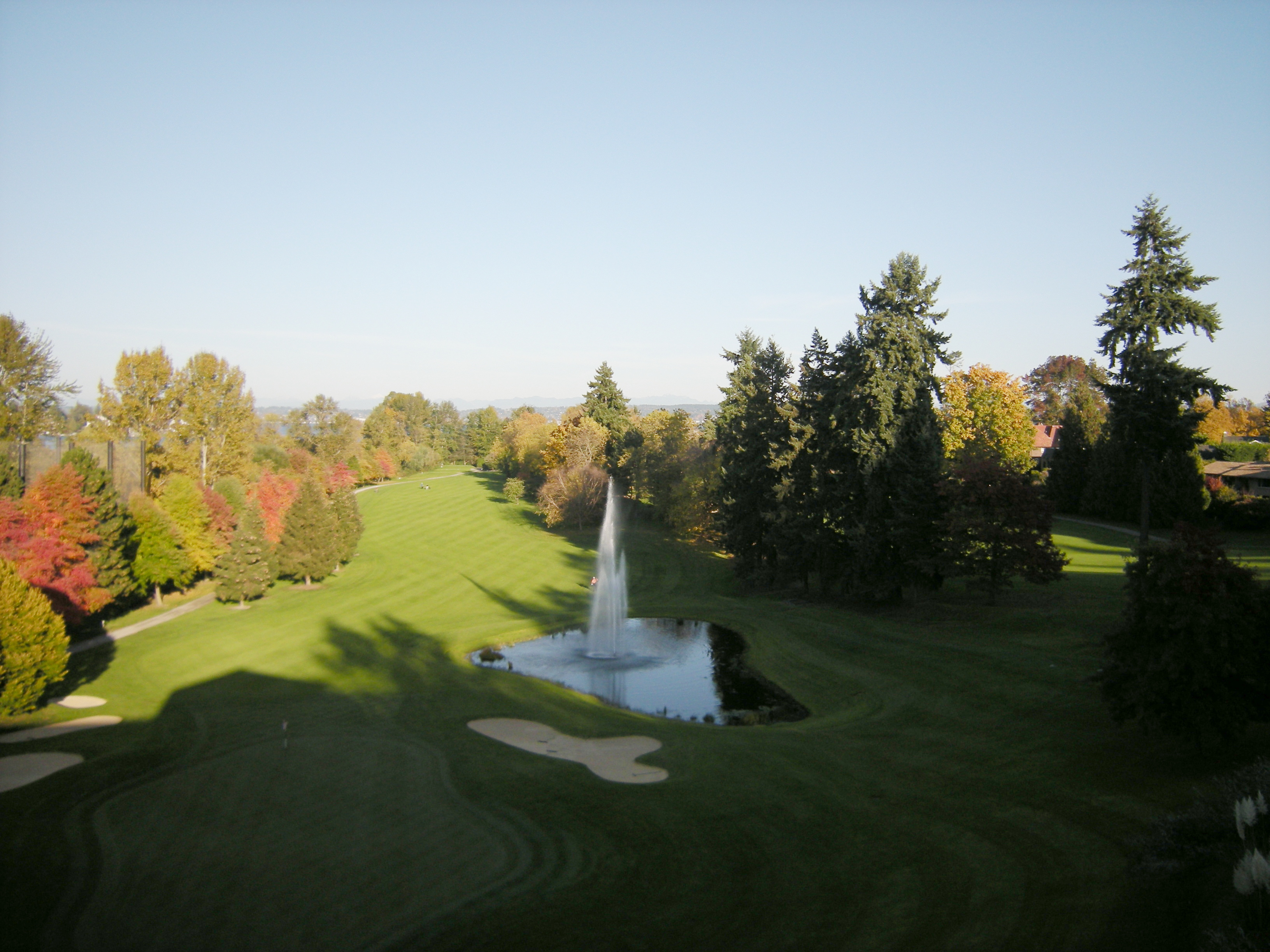
Golf course at Broadmoor, photographed 2008

Broadmoor is an 85 acre (340,000 m²) gated residential community with a 115 acre (465,000 m²) golf course in Seattle, Washington, United States. It is bounded on the west by the Washington Park Arboretum; on the south by East Madison Street, beyond which is the Washington Park neighborhood; on the east by 37th Avenue East, beyond which is the Madison Park neighborhood; and on the north by Union Bay marshland. It was founded on September 10, 1924.

Broadmoor was developed on land that had been logged by the Puget Mill Company for sixty years. In 1920, the parcel was split in two. The western 230 acres (930,000 m²) were given to the city, who developed Washington Park on the site; the eastern 200 acres (800,000 m²) were developed as Broadmoor by a group of businessmen that included E. G. Ames, general manager of Puget Mill. Like other developments by Puget Mill, Broadmoor was built as a racially segregated neighborhood, using exclusionary covenants to block prospective home buyers of certain races and ethnicities. For example, a 1928 covenant blocked "any Hebrew or by any person of the Ethiopian, Malay or any Asiatic Race".

== See also ==
- Broadmoor Golf Club, Seattle
