= Cactus (restaurant) =

Restaurant in Washington, United States

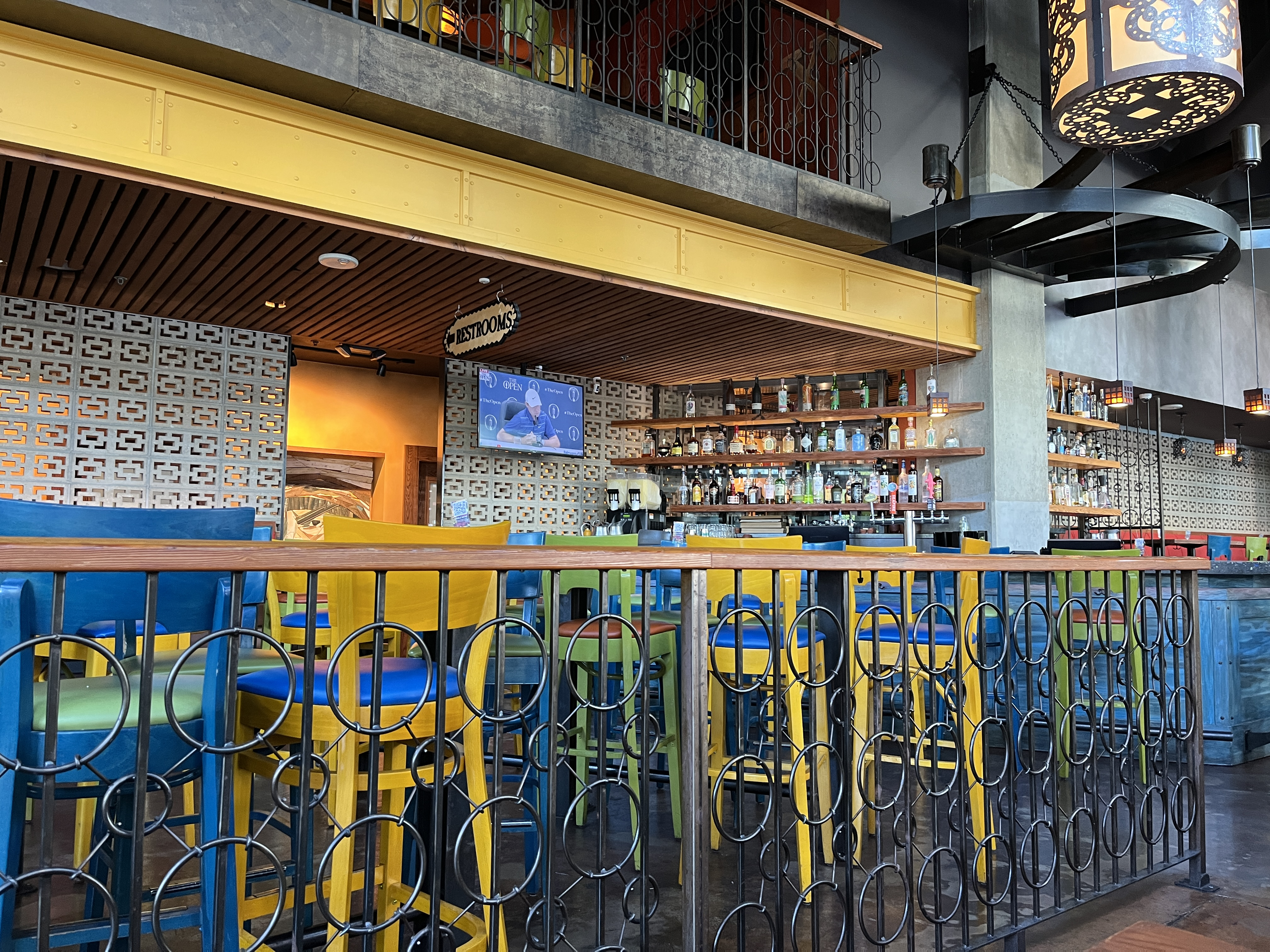
- Interior of the South Lake Union restaurant, 2023

Restaurant information
- Established: 1990
- Location: Washington, United States
- Website: cactusrestaurants.com

Cactus is a chain of restaurants in the Seattle metropolitan area, in the United States. Bret and Marc Chatalas opened the original restaurant in Seattle's Madison Park neighborhood in 1990; since then, additional locations have opened in the city's Alki Point and South Lake Union neighborhoods, as well as the nearby cities of Bellevue, Kirkland, and Tacoma.

== Description ==
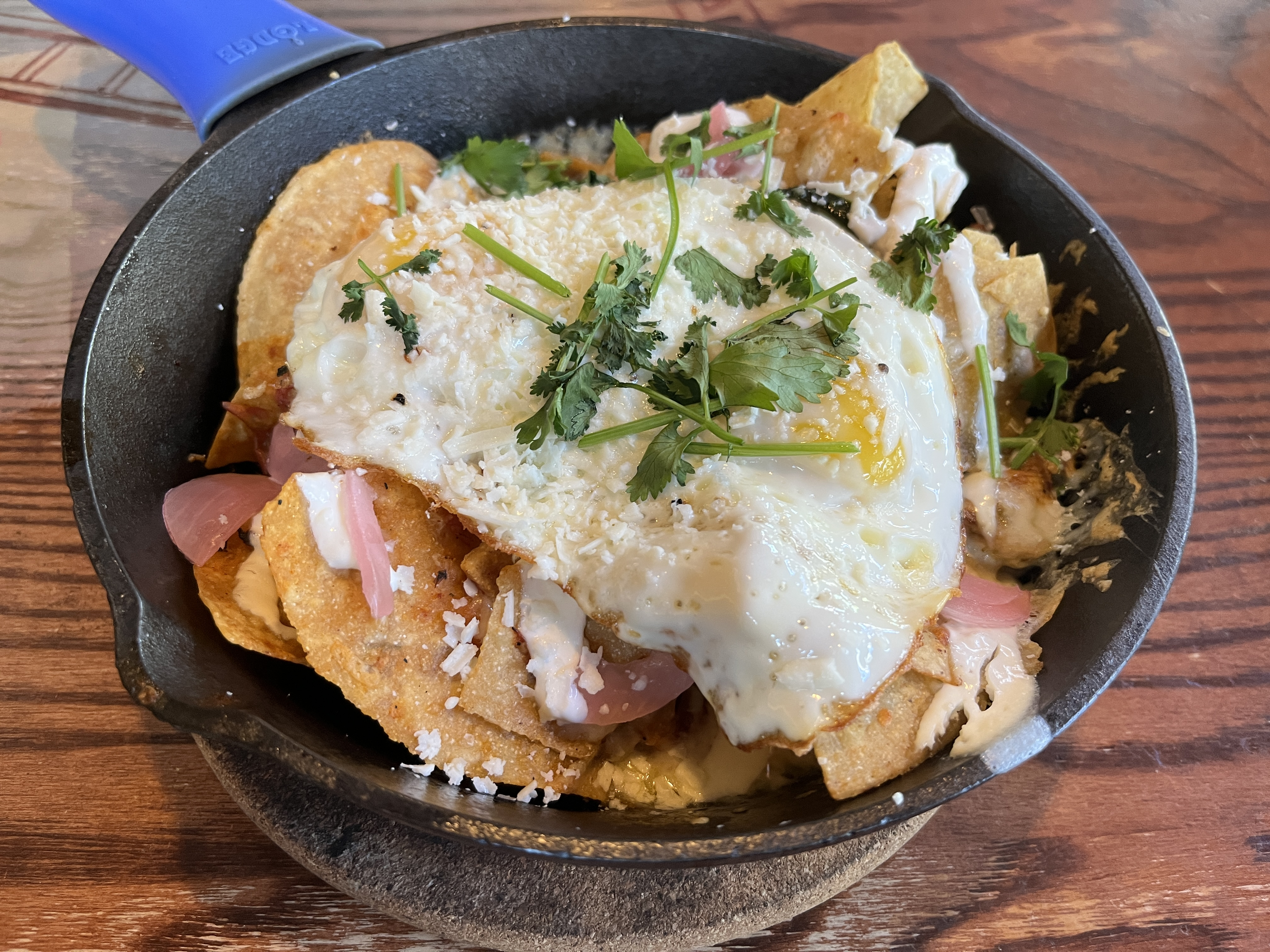
Chilaquiles with chicken, 2023

The restaurant offers American, Cuban, Mexican, Southwestern, and Spanish cuisine. The menu has included enchiladas with butternut squash, tacos with brisket, and tamales with Ahi tuna or Dungeness crab. Cactus has also served antojitos, salads, soups, polenta cakes, sautéed bananas in rum, and margaritas.

== History ==
Bret and Marc Chatalas founded Cactus in Madison Park in 1990. In Seattle, the business also operates in Alki Point and South Lake Union. In South Lake Union, Cactus is located in a building owned by Amazon. Elsewhere in the metropolitan area, Cactus has also operated in Kirkland (since 2002), Tacoma, and Bellevue. In Bellevue, Cactus is located at Bellevue Square, where the Chatalas' partnered with others to open Tavern Hall.

In 2015, Cactus joined Amazon's restaurant delivery service Prime Now. In 2017, Marc Chatalas said 93–94 percent of business was paid via credit cards. During the COVID-19 pandemic, the business moved away from using third-party delivery services.

Cactus was featured on the first season of Rachael's Vacations, a Food Network series hosted by Rachael Ray.

== See also ==
- List of Mexican restaurants
- List of restaurant chains in the United States
