= Foster Island (Washington) =

Island in Seattle, Washington, United States

Coordinates: 47°38′32.5″N 122°17′29.7″W

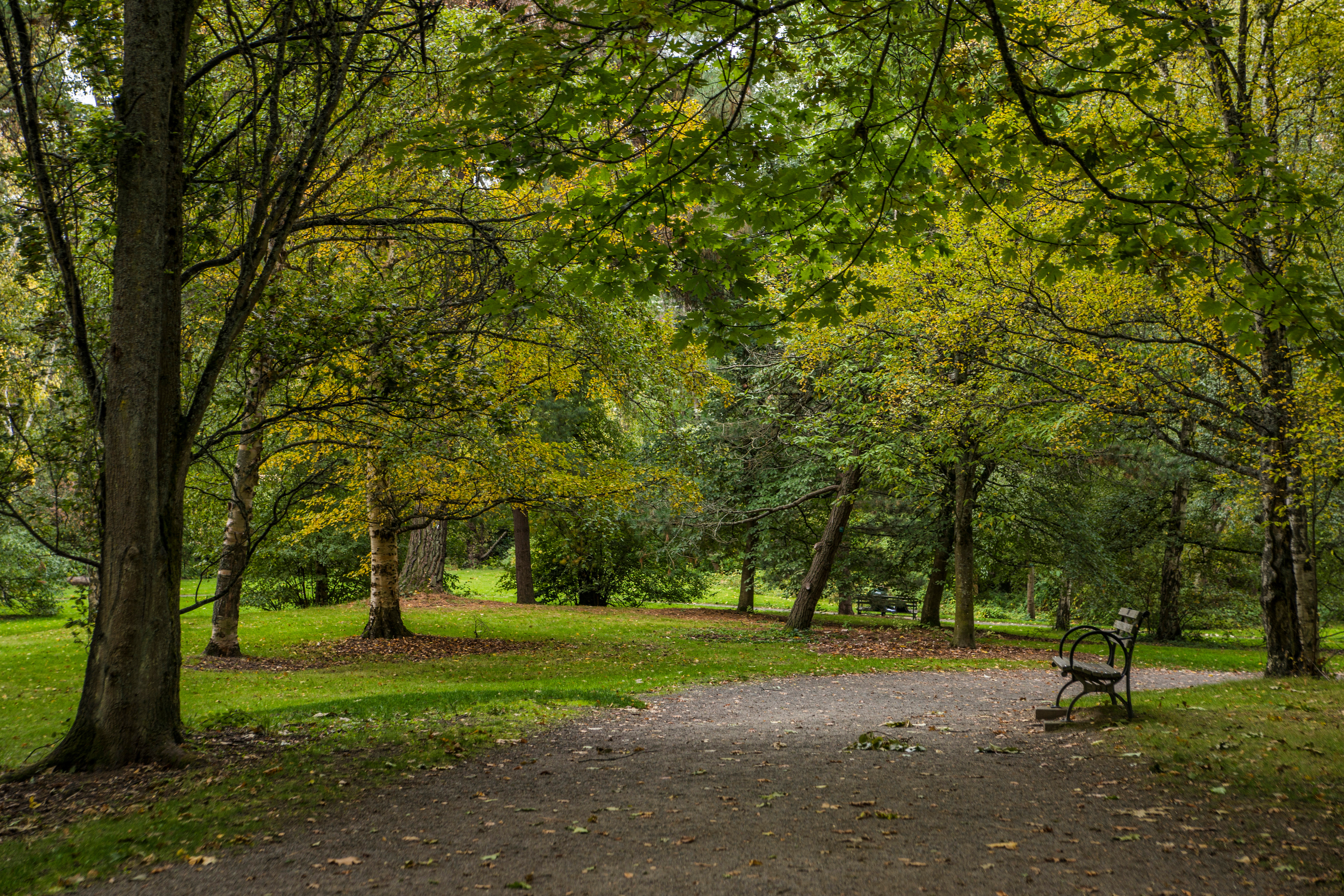
- Interactive map of Foster Island

Geography
- Location: Union Bay

Administration
- United States
- City: Seattle

Additional information
- Time zone: Pacific (UTC-8)
  - Summer (DST): PDT (UTC-7)

See Foster Island (Ontario) for the island in the Canadian province of Ontario.

Foster Island is an island in Seattle, Washington, situated on Union Bay. Bisected by State Route 520, it is part of the Washington Park Arboretum. There is a walking trail connecting Foster Island and the adjacent Marsh Island to mainland Seattle via a set of bridges and boardwalks.

The island was a Duwamish burial ground, and it is eligible for the National Register of Historic Places as a traditional cultural property.

== Duwamish use ==
Foster Island was a Duwamish burial ground. The Duwamish call it Stitici, which means "Little Island". The dead were placed in the bodies of trees, or placed in canoes in the branches of trees. Because of this practice, bones were scattered widely, so no clear archeological evidence of the burial sites remain.

== Growth of the island ==
Before 1916, the area was two small islands with a submerged low spot between them. In 1916, the opening of the Lake Washington Ship Canal lowered Lake Washington by about 9 feet. The lower water exposed the flooded spot, and the two islands became one. Soil from the canal excavation also added land. The island grew from about two acres to about ten acres.

== State Route 520 ==
The Evergreen Point Floating Bridge (1963) of State Route 520 was constructed from 1961 to 1963, bisecting the island.

In 2005, the state was studying new four-lane and six-lane bridge designs for the replacement bridge, which involved digging into the ground for new bridge pilings. Duwamish tribal chairwoman Cecile Hansen wrote to the project director that any excavation of any size would violate a sacred burial ground, and the tribe said it would oppose new pilings or digging on the island.

In 2010, the Washington State Department of Transportation determined that Foster Island is a traditional cultural property, which means it is a place important to the living traditions of a community. The island is eligible for the National Register of Historic Places.

The Federal Highway Administration found that the replacement 520 bridge would have an adverse effect on the Foster Island traditional cultural property. Because of this, WSDOT and FHWA had to write and carry out at treatment plan for the island. The plan involved restoring part of the island with native plants, which crews tested the soil for archaeological resources before planting. It also involved irrigation for the plants under the new bridge, and three interpretive signs that name plants in English and Lushootseed.
