= East Montlake Park =

Park in Seattle, Washington, U.S.

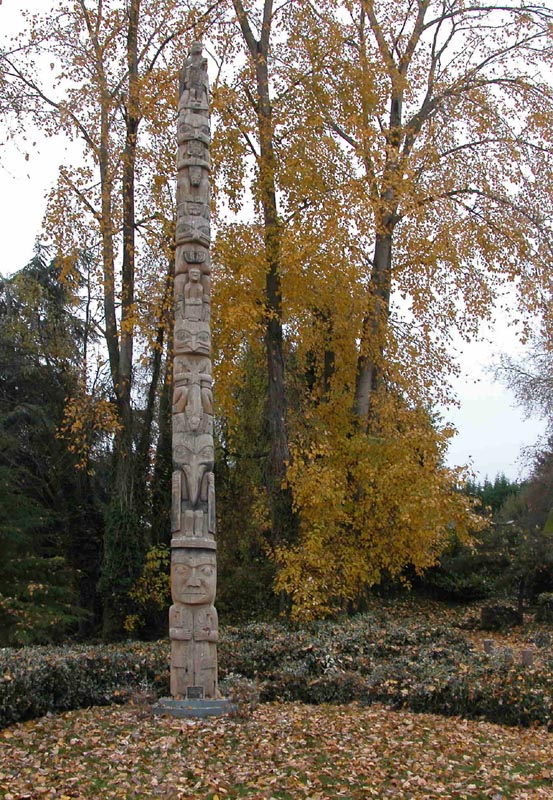
- Totem pole carved by John Dewey Wallace
- Interactive map of East Montlake Park
- Location: Seattle, Washington, United States
- Coordinates: 47°38′46.49″N 122°17′59.12″W
- Created: 1971; 55 years ago
- Operator: Seattle Parks and Recreation
- Open: 4AM to 11:30PM
- Status: Open

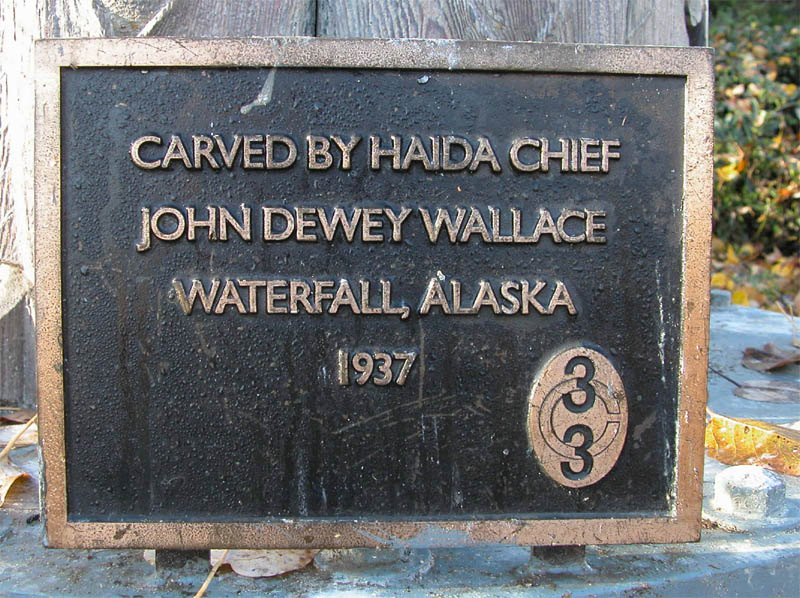
Totem pole plaque

East Montlake Park is a park in the Montlake neighborhood of Seattle, Washington, USA. The park is bounded on the north by the Montlake Cut, on the east by Union Bay, on the south by Washington State Route 520, and on the west by East Park Drive E. It is across from the Huskies Stadium. There is a large parking area.

The 1971 Montlake Cut Waterside Trail runs through the park past the 40-foot totem pole shown at right on its way to West Montlake Park. A plaque at the bottom of the totem pole states that it was carved in 1937 by John Dewey Wallace, a Haida chief, in Waterfall, Alaska. The dedication ceremony for the donated totem pole took place in May 1983. The park used to house the Museum of History and Industry (MOHAI) until the museum was relocated to a different location. There are also floating paths, an observation deck, and some benches.

Before construction of the Evergreen Point Floating Bridge replacement, McCurdy Park, formerly home to the Museum of History & Industry, existed to the south and east. Since 2019, East Montlake Park has been closed for preparation of the WSDOT 520 bridge replacement project.
