= West Montlake Park =

Park in Seattle, Washington, U.S.

Coordinates: 47°38′47″N 122°18′34″W

- Interactive map of West Montlake Park
- Location: Montlake, United States
- Created: 1909

West Montlake Park, facing west over Portage Bay

West Montlake Park is a park by Portage Bay in the Montlake neighborhood of Seattle, Washington. The park is bounded on the north by the Montlake Cut, on the west by Portage Bay, on the south by the Seattle Yacht Club marina, and on the east by West Park Drive E. It is connected to East Montlake Park by the 1971 Montlake Cut Waterside Trail, which runs along the cut and passes under the Montlake Bridge.

The park was acquired by the city in 1909. The park has paths, an observation deck, a fishing pier, and benches. It was built by the U.S. Army Corps of Engineers in 1971.
