= Madison Park, Seattle =

Neighborhood of Seattle, Washington

Coordinates: 47°38′5.8″N 122°16′43.9″W

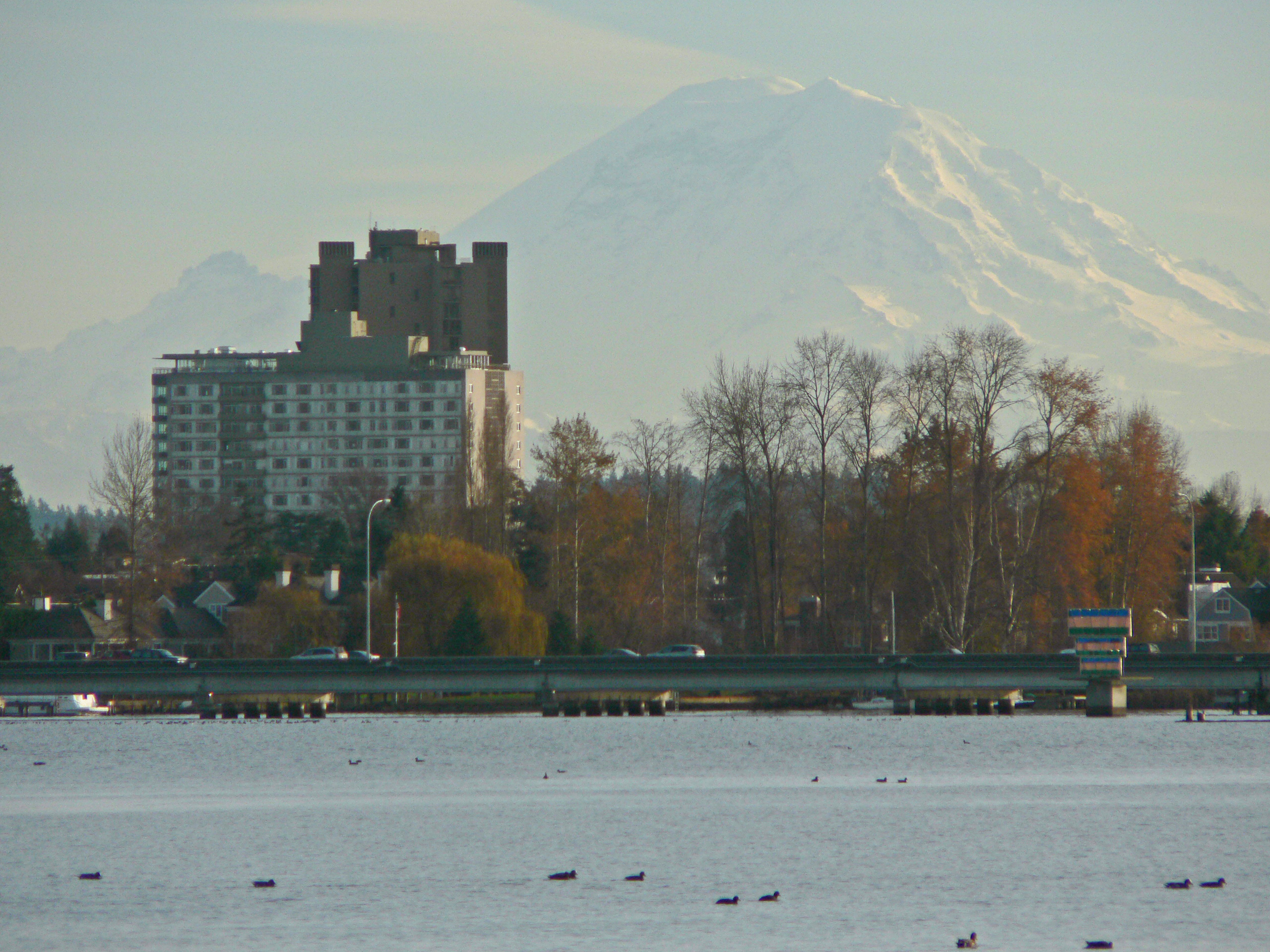
Madison Park with Union Bay in the foreground and Mount Rainier behind

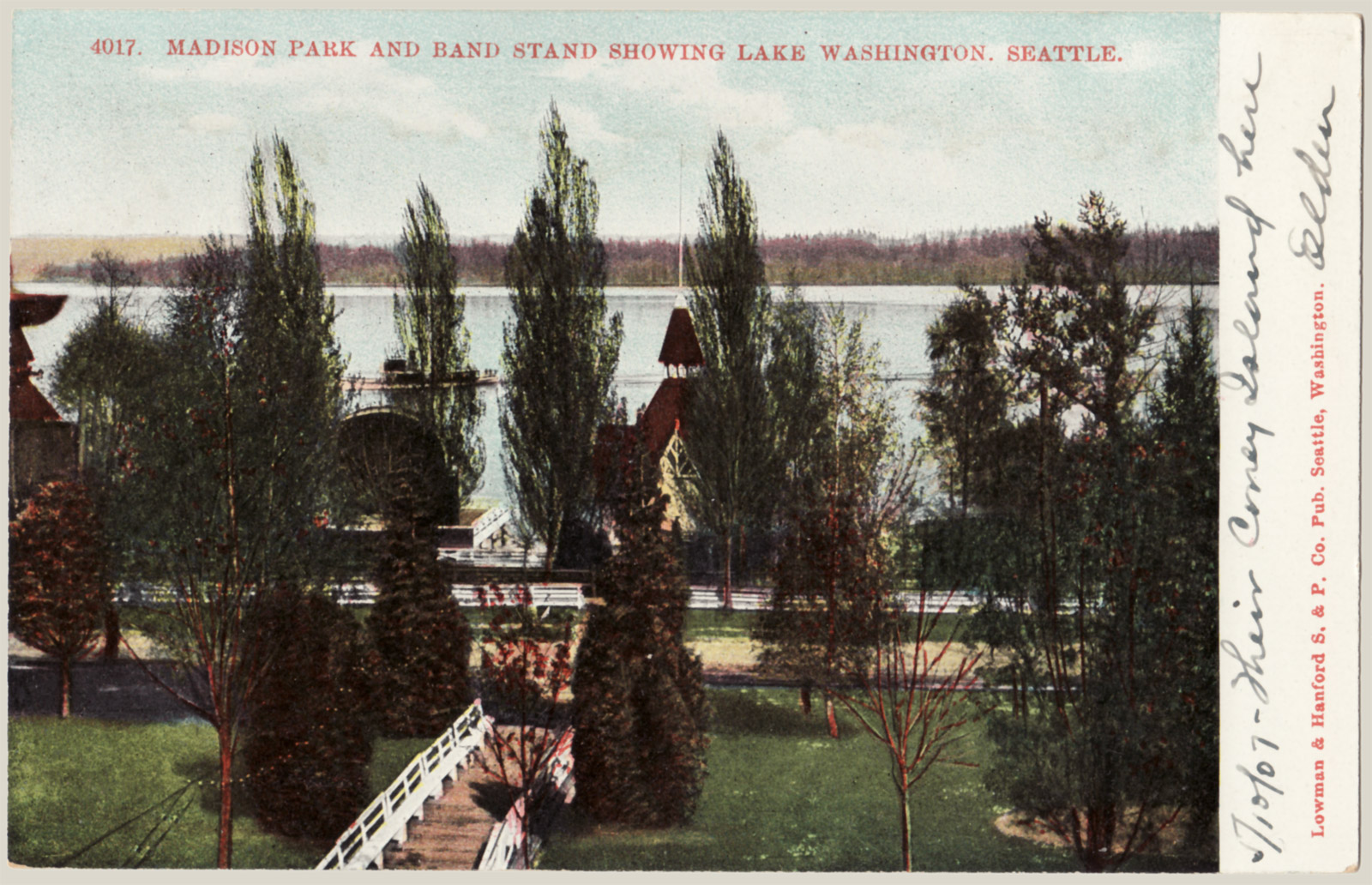
The city park, circa 1907

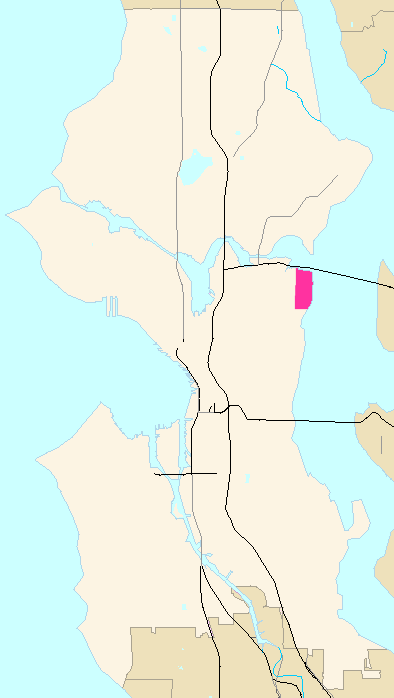
Madison Park

Madison Park is a neighborhood in eastern Seattle, Washington, United States. It is named after the city park at the foot of Madison Street on the Lake Washington shore. The neighborhood is generally bounded on the east by Lake Washington; on the south by East Prospect Street, beyond which is Denny-Blaine; on the west by Lake Washington Boulevard E.; and on the north by Union Bay. Madison Park generally consists of single-family housing with a small business district near the park.

The neighborhood was developed at the end of Madison Streets in the 1860s by Judge John J. McGilvra, who built his family home in the area and donated 24 acres (9.7 ha) for use as a public park. The city's first ballpark was built along Madison Street in 1890. In the early 20th century, Madison Park became a popular summer destination for Seattleites due to its access via cable car and ferries to the Eastside. The neighborhood continues to draw local residents for recreation in the summer.

Washington Park and the private Broadmoor community and golf course are subunits within Madison Park. The neighborhood's main thoroughfares are E. Madison Street (northeast- and southwest-bound) and McGilvra Boulevard E. (north- and southbound).

Madison Park's Pioneer Hall (also known as Washington Pioneer Hall) is listed on the National Register of Historic Places, ID #70000645.
