= Washington Park Arboretum =

Arboretum at the University of Washington

Washington Park
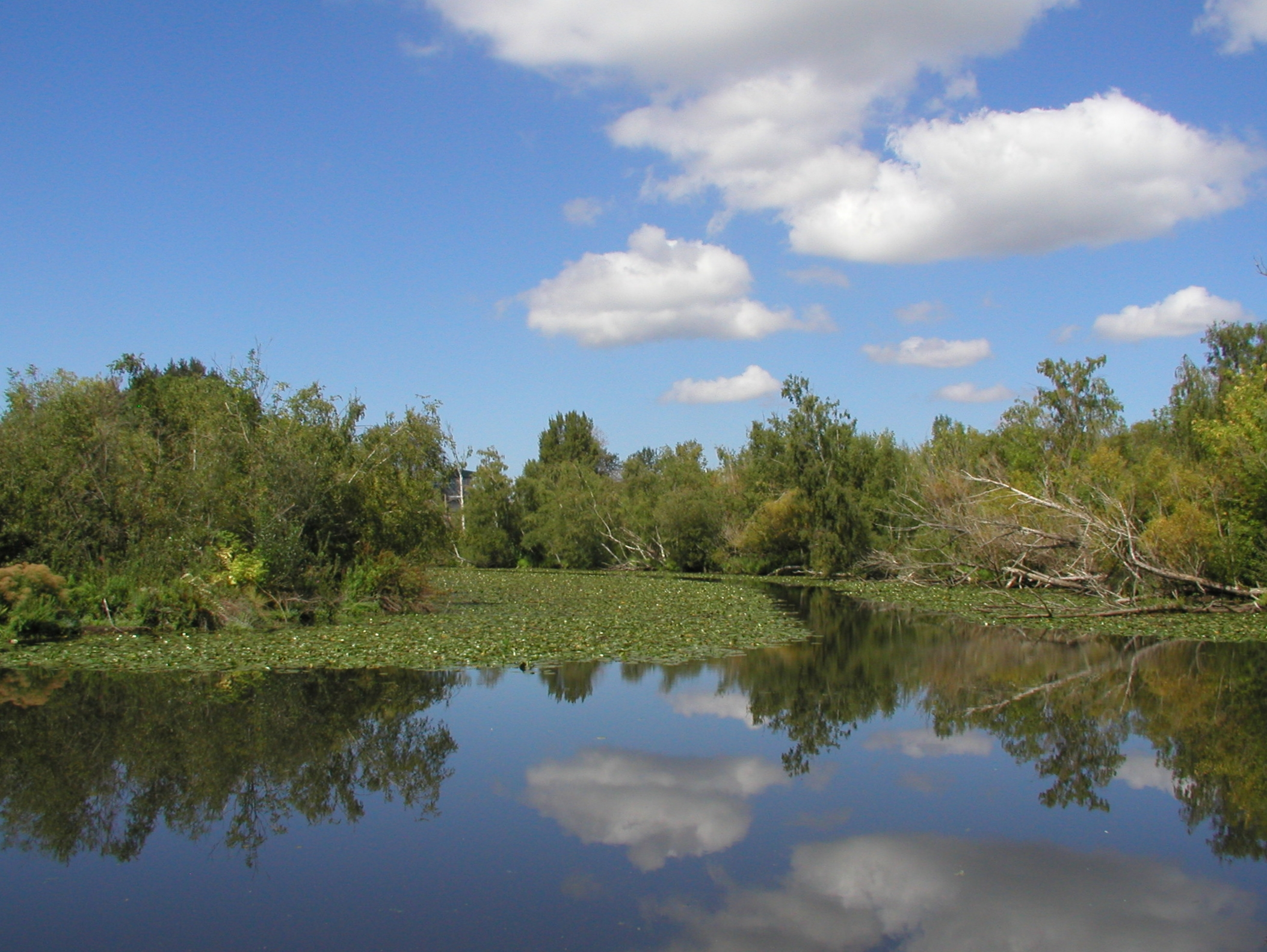
- Wetlands in the park by Foster Island.

- Location within Washington (state)
- Coordinates: 47.6364162°N 122.2958146°W
- Created: 1934
- Etymology: George Washington
- Operator: University of Washington; Seattle Parks and Recreation; Arboretum Foundation
- Status: Open all year
- Parking: Available
- Website: botanicgardens.uw.edu

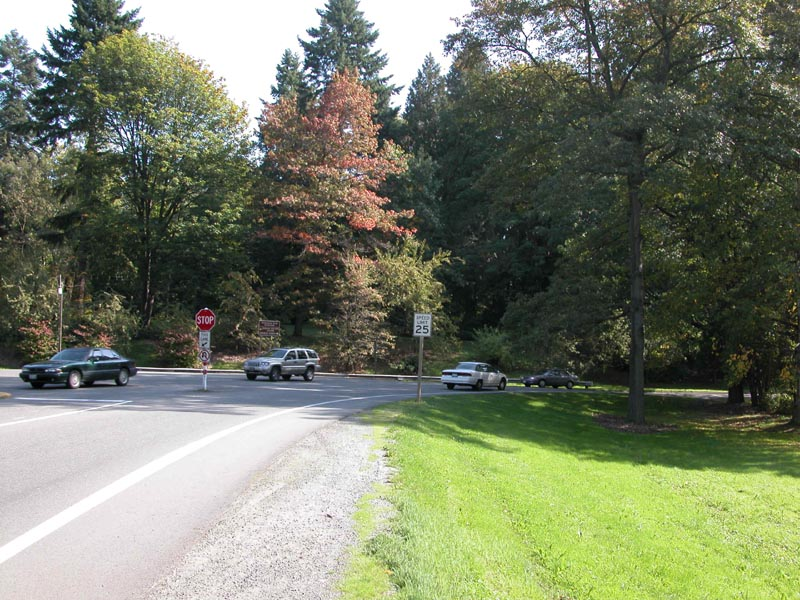
The park's northern entrance

Washington Park is a public park in Seattle, Washington, United States, most of which is taken up by the Washington Park Arboretum, a joint project of the University of Washington, the Seattle Parks and Recreation, and the nonprofit Arboretum Foundation. Washington Park also includes a playfield and the Seattle Japanese Garden in its southwest corner. To the north is Union Bay; to the west are Montlake and Madison Valley; to the south is the Washington Park neighborhood; and to the east is the Broadmoor Golf Club.

== Description ==
Lake Washington Boulevard E. runs north and south through the park, parallel to the creek. A secondary road, for most of its length named Arboretum Drive E. and for a short northern stretch named E. Foster Island Road, runs along the Arboretum's eastern edge. E. Interlaken Boulevard and Boyer Avenue E. run northwest out of the park to Montlake and beyond. State Route 520 cuts through Foster Island and the Union Bay wetlands at the park's northern end, interchanging with Lake Washington Boulevard just outside the arboretum entrance. A footpath winds underneath the freeway overpasses and over boardwalks, along the Lake Washington ship canal, and into the gardens of the Arboretum.

The Arboretum has the Azalea Way in the springtime, a stretch of the park which offers a tapestry of azaleas of many colors. The area is a site for strolling and is utilized by photographers and artists. The manicured Azalea Way contrasts with the Arboretum's heavily canopied areas.

The land occupied by the Washington Park Arboretum has been developed and is owned by the city, but the Arboretum is operated primarily by the University of Washington.

Arboretum Creek is approximately 4,000 feet (1,200 m) long, entirely within the park. Its average channel width is 4 feet (1.2 m) and its average channel depth is 2 feet (0.61 m). The creek's source is a spring-fed stream in the Alder Creek Natural Area, three publicly owned properties on 26th Ave East between East Helen and Prospect streets. The stream feeds the koi pond in Washington Park's Japanese Garden, near Washington Park Playfield at the park's southern end. It also receives runoff from Rhododendron Glen and the Woodland Garden, as well as sub-surface drainage from the neighboring course of the Broadmoor Golf Club. It empties into Lake Washington via Willow Bay, itself a minor arm of Union Bay, having passed through numerous culverts under Lake Washington Boulevard.

== History ==
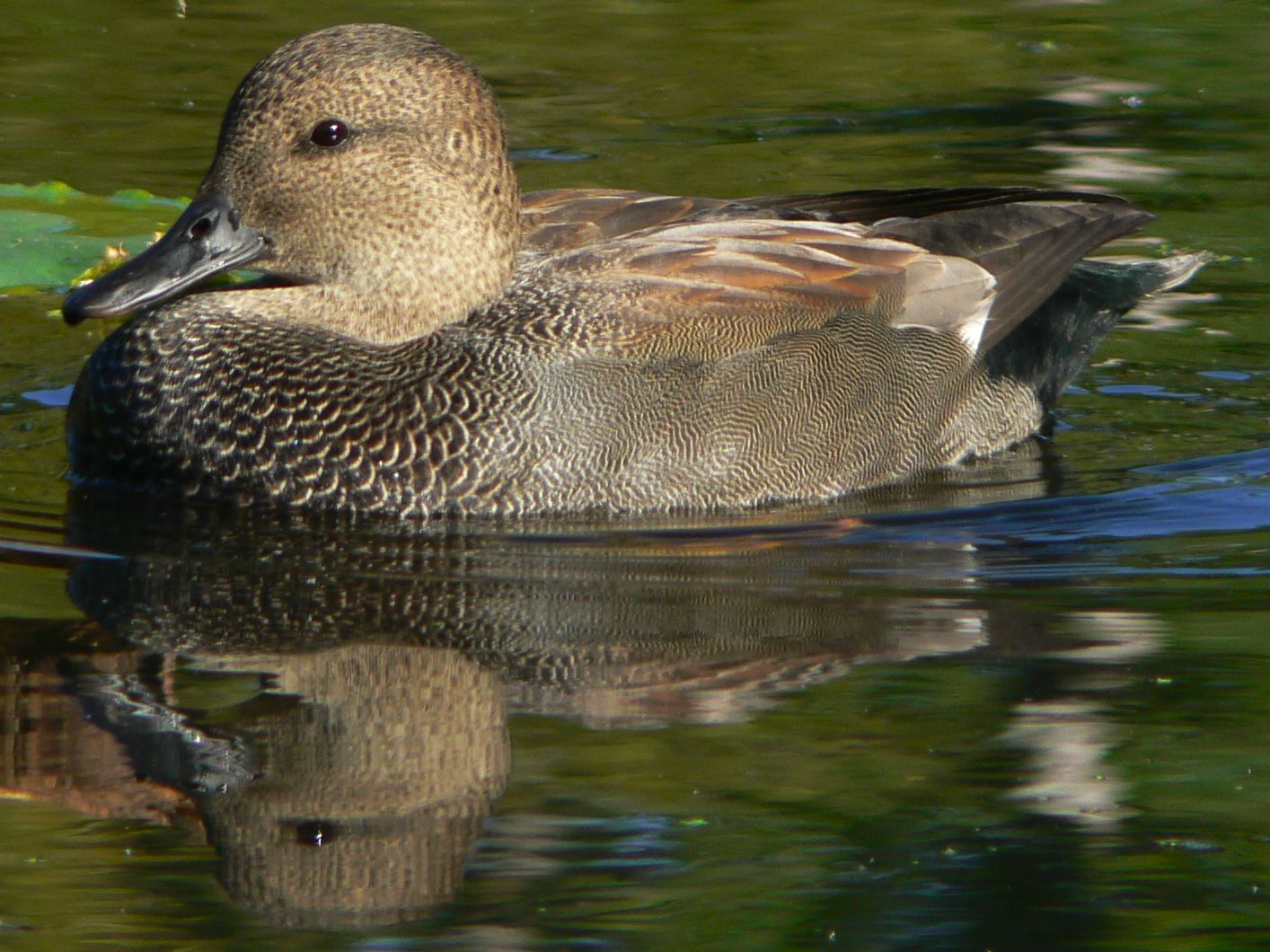
Gadwalls and other waterfowl feed in the park

Prior to colonization, the area which would become Washington Park was home to the Duwamish people. They called it Sxwacugwit, meaning "portage" or "narrow passage" due to its strategic importance as a transportation link between the coast and the inland river systems which fed into Lake Washington. The Duwamish village of Slalal stood east of the mouth of Arboretum Creek. Under the Treaty of Point Elliott the land was opened to white settlement in 1855.

In the 19th century, the land was purchased from the federal government by Fred Drew, a timber surveyor working for the Puget Mill Company. The old-growth forest was logged in the 1880s and 1890s, after which the company planned to develop the land. However, these plans were halted by the Panic of 1893. The City of Seattle Parks Commission acquired the property in 1900, and contracted the Olmsted Brothers landscaping firm to design the park. Lake Washington Boulevard was built in 1903 and a speedway for horse racing was built.

The area remained largely undeveloped until 1920, when the parcel was split in two. The eastern 200 acres (0.8 km^{2}) were developed as the Broadmoor Golf Club by a group of businessmen that included E. G. Ames, general manager of Puget Mill. The western 230 acres were given to the city, who developed a park and arboretum on the site. On the basis of the agreement approved by the University of Washington (Board of Regents) and the City of Seattle (City Council/Mayor), The Washington Park Arboretum was established in 1934. The former horse racing track was converted into a pedestrian path called Azalea Way.

During the Great Depression many improvements to the park were made by Works Progress Administration crews, who built drainage infrastructure and fences, cleared land, planted plants, and built a number of park buildings. Eleanor Roosevelt visited the park in 1938 and planted an elm tree.

The Japanese Garden was opened in June 1960. The original teahouse was destroyed by arson in April 1973, and a replacement was opened in March 1981. Some WPA-era maintenance buildings were replaced by the current visitor center, which opened in 1985 on the 50th anniversary of the Arboretum Foundation.

== SR 520 Highway impacts ==
=== Ghost ramps ===
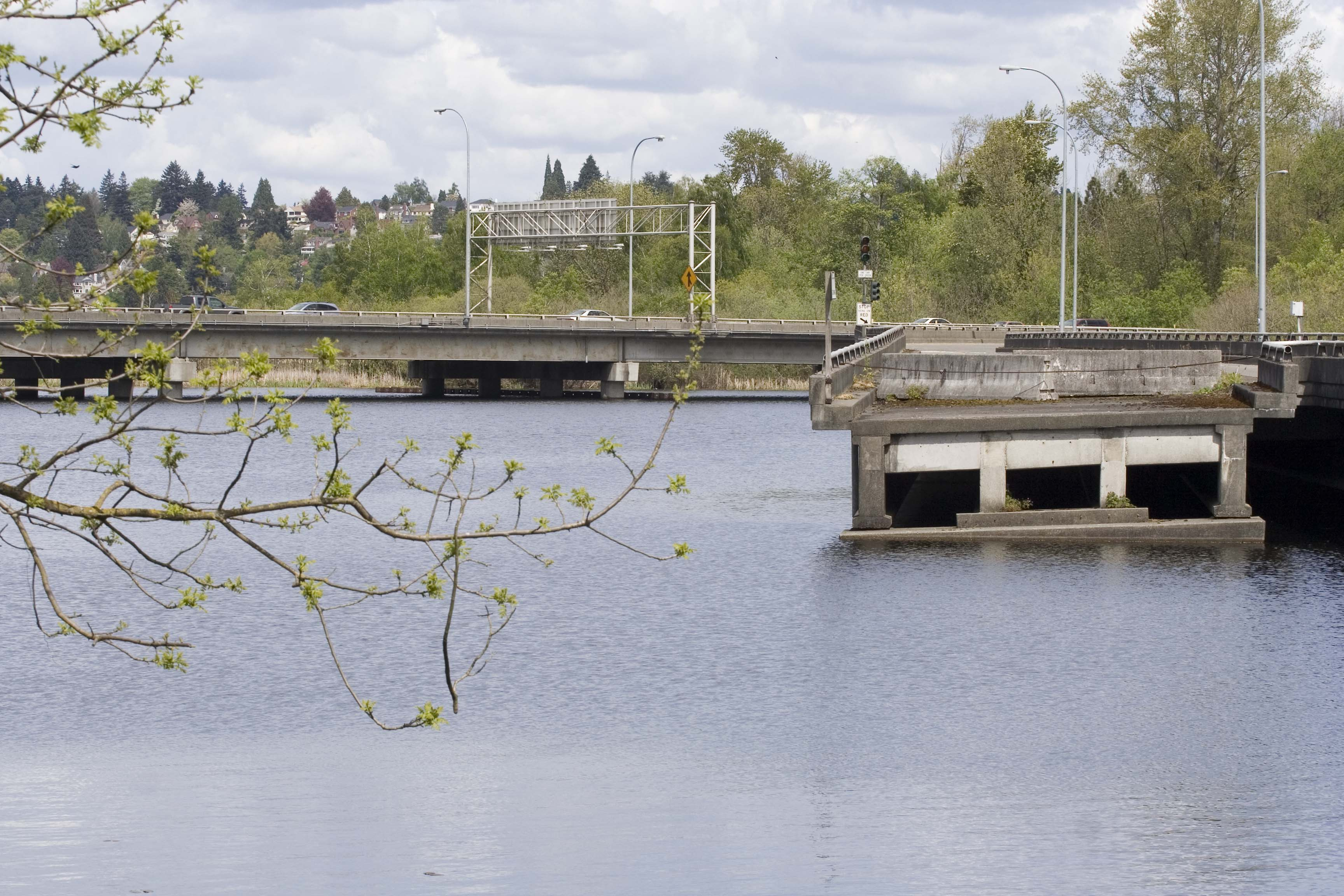
The arboretum ghost ramps at SR 520 in 2009.

State Route 520 had a set of ghost ramps in the marshlands of the arboretum. They were built in 1962 as part of a future plan to build the R. H. Thomson Expressway, which would have cut through the arboretum and down through Seattle towards the I-90/I-5 interchange. Citizens rallied a freeway revolt against the plan on May 4, 1969. Construction near the Arboretum later continued, but citizen protest eventually won out and the plan was dropped in 1971. One ramp was used for the on-ramp from Lake Washington Boulevard to SR 520 Eastbound, while the others remained unused and became known locally as "ramps to nowhere".

The freeway revolt that stopped the R. H. Thomson Expressway had its origins in opposition to SR 520 itself. Architect Victor Steinbrueck, writing in 1962, objected to the "naked brutality of unimaginative structures such as this proposed crossing of Portage Bay, which eliminates fifty houseboats while casting its shadow and noise across this tranquil boat haven."

In 2013 the Washington State Department of Transportation announced plans to dismantle the ghost ramps. To commemorate the ramps and protest their demolition, a local art collective created an installation, Gate to Nowhere, on one of the ramps in 2014. The piece consisted of a layer of reflective acrylic wrapping a pair of support columns.

The ghost ramp removal work began in the spring of 2016 as part of the 520 Bridge Replacement Project. They were mostly removed by 2017, though one section was kept as parking for contractors working on the new floating bridge. The final section was removed in 2024, with the exception of a single bridge support consisting of four columns and a support beam. This was allowed to remain as a historical monument in commemoration of the ghost ramps and the freeway revolt.

=== Bridge replacement project ===
The potential impact of plans to reconstruct and expand State Route 520 and replace the Evergreen Point Floating Bridge in the early 2010s raised concerns among Arboretum staff and park users. As the members of the Arboretum community noted in their collective letter to the Washington State Department of Transportation, "Native plants, wetlands, and wildlife ... would be affected not only by the taking of land but by the looming shadows created by roadways in various proposals". Among the alternative proposals was the "Arboretum Bypass Plan," to build the new elevated highway over Union Bay on a more northerly route than the then-existing one. Although the final alignment of the new bridge was 35 feet north of the previous bridge, it did not go over Union Bay.

The bridge replacement project included a number of measures to reduce or mitigate ecological impact as well as some improvements to the arboretum. Eight ecological restoration projects were completed using bridge replacement funding, both in the vicinity of the bridge and around the Puget Sound region. Park improvements included a new multiuse trail from East Madison Street to Montlake and the University District and a pedestrian undercrossing on Foster Island.

== Seattle Japanese Garden ==
The Seattle Japanese Garden is a 3.5 acre (14,000 m^{2}) Japanese garden in the Madison Park neighborhood of Seattle, Washington. The Garden is located in the Southern end of the Washington Park Arboretum on Lake Washington Boulevard East. The Garden is one of the oldest Japanese Gardens in North America, and is regarded as one of the most authentic Japanese Gardens in the United States.

== See also ==
- List of botanical gardens in the United States
- North American Plant Collections Consortium
