= Union Bay (Seattle) =

Bay of Lake Washington in Seattle

Coordinates: 47°39′N 122°17′W

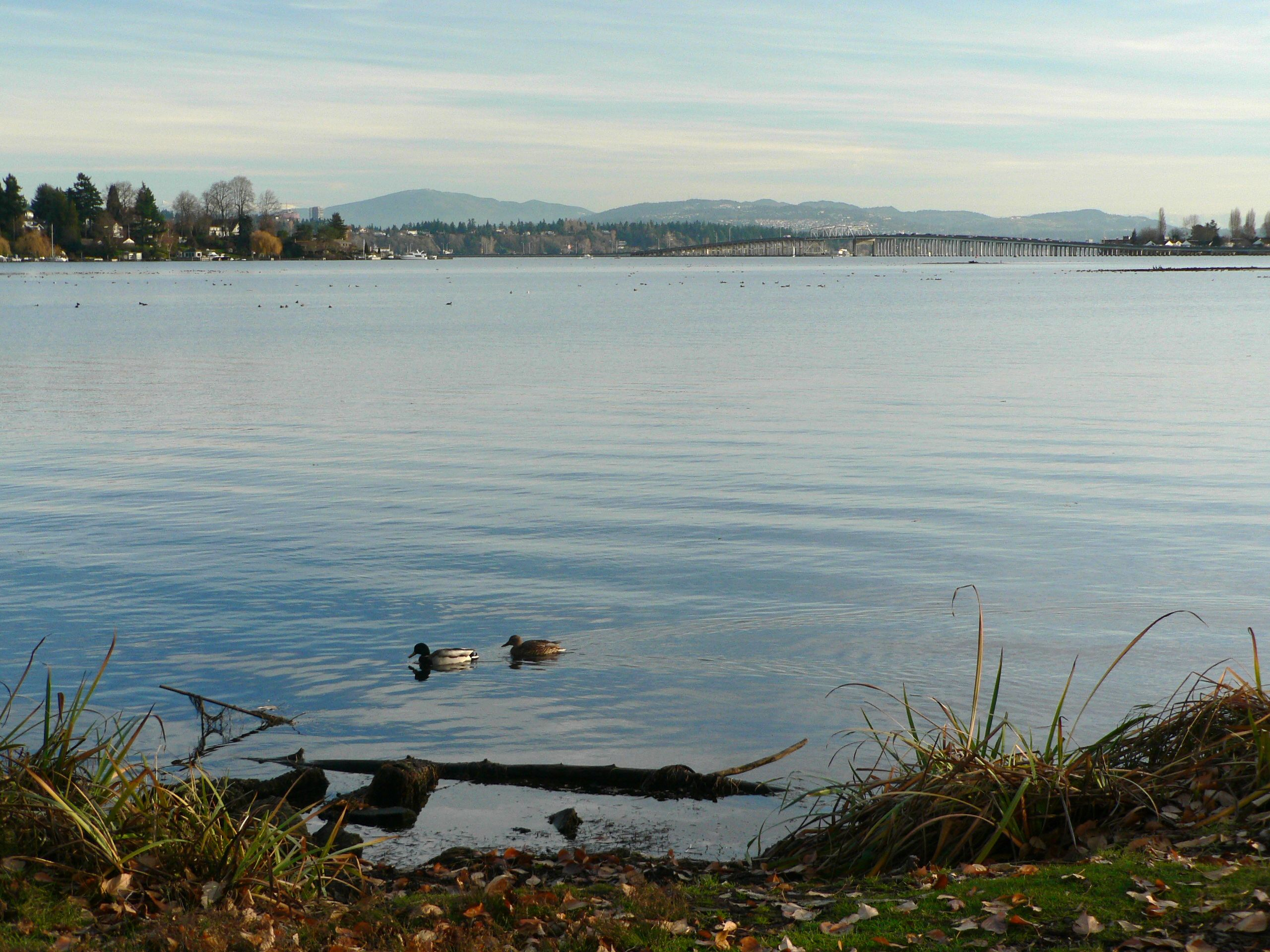
Union Bay viewed from the Natural Area with Laurelhurst, the Evergreen Point Floating Bridge and Madison Park (left to right) in the background

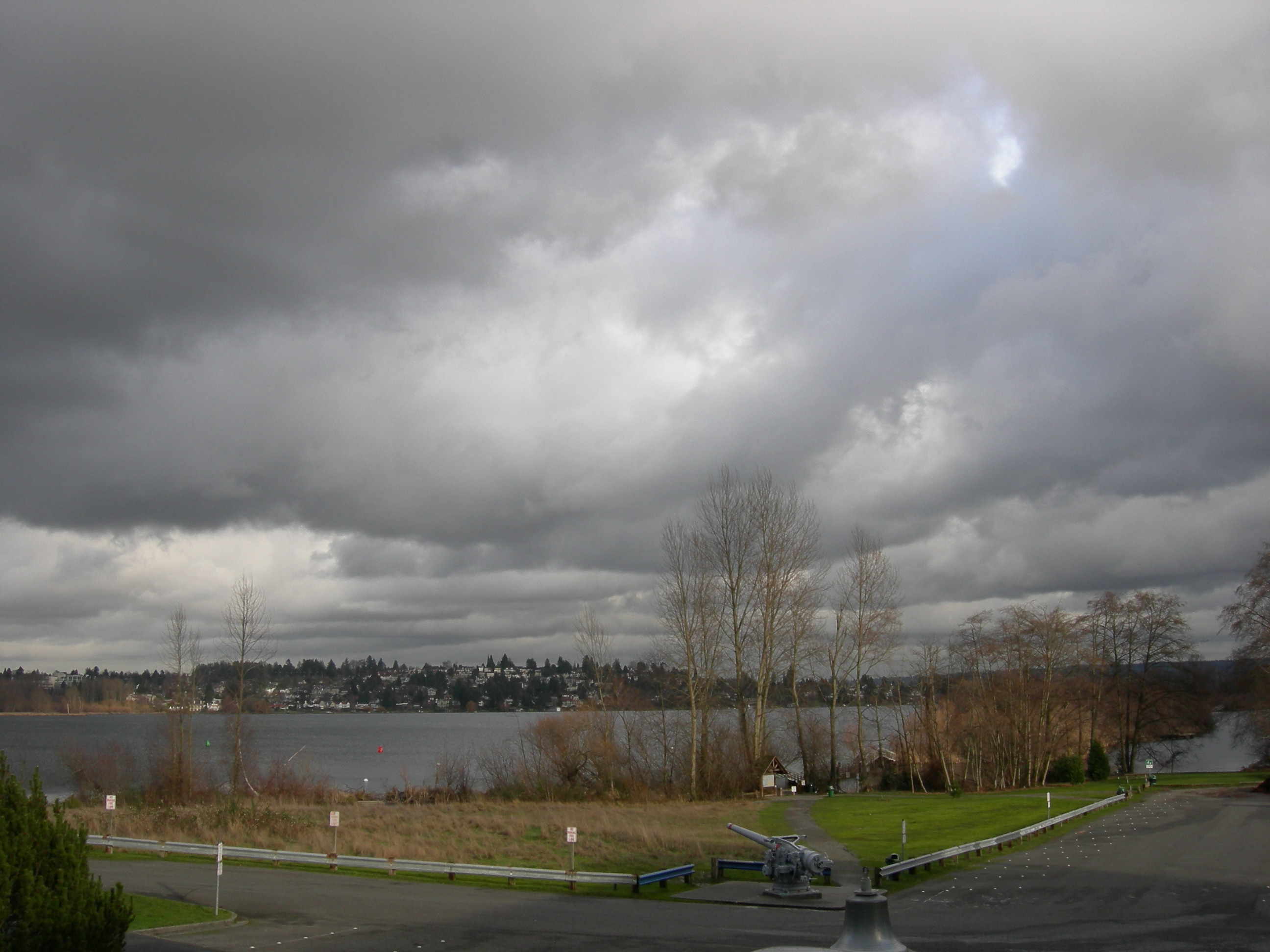
Winter view across Union Bay toward Laurelhurst, from the building that formerly housed the Museum of History & Industry (MOHAI)

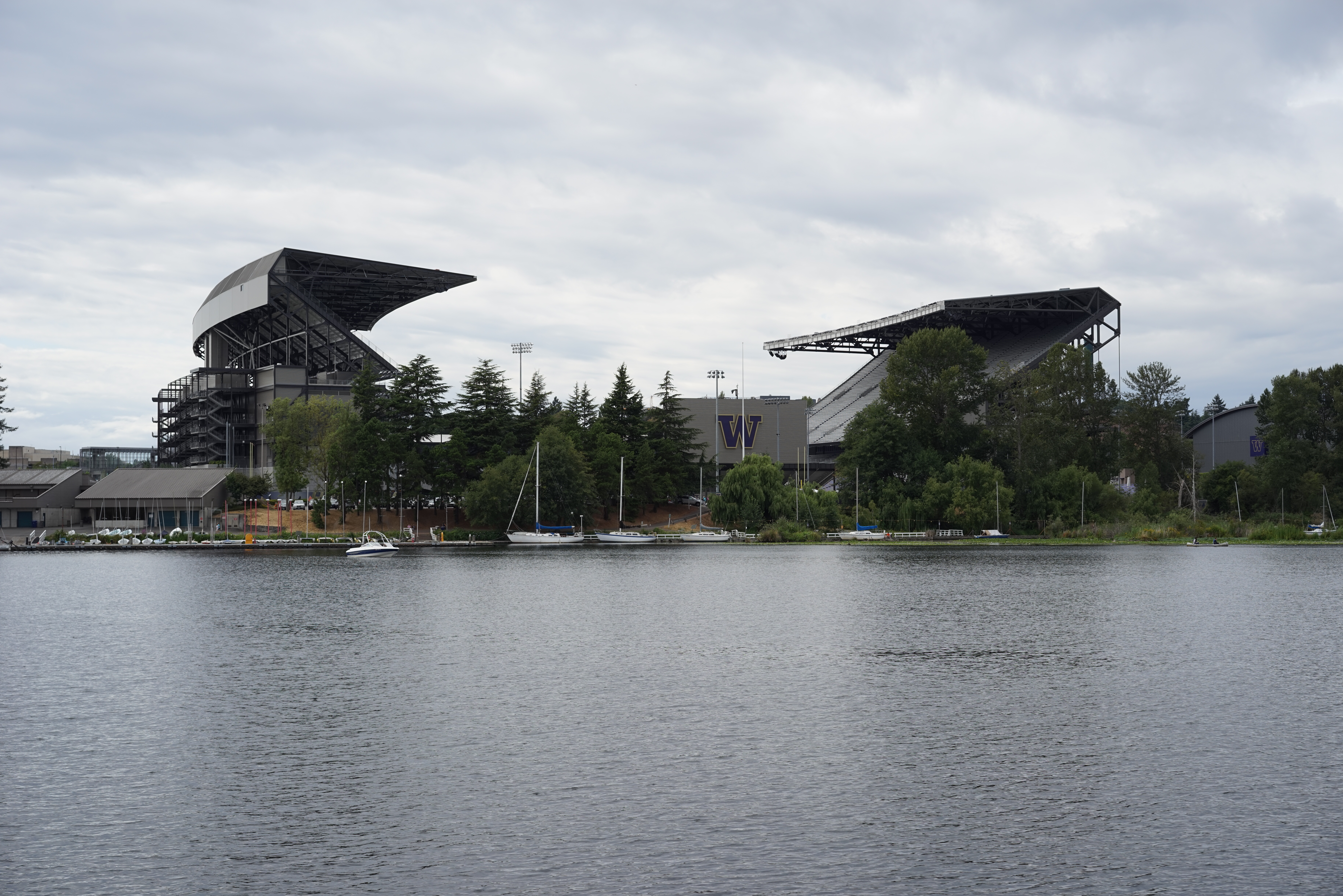
Looking west from Union Bay at Husky Stadium in 2015

Union Bay is a body of water located in Seattle, Washington. Part of Lake Washington, it is bounded by the Laurelhurst neighborhood to the north and the Montlake and Madison Park neighborhoods to the south. The Evergreen Point Floating Bridge, which carries State Route 520, crosses over a portion of the bay.

Marsh Island and Foster Island are located in Union Bay, and are connected to the mainland (and each other) by the Arboretum Waterfront Trail and the Foster Island Trail. Union Bay ends at the eastern opening of the Montlake Cut, which connects Union Bay with Portage Bay (an arm of Lake Union) to the west—this marks the beginning of the Lake Washington Ship Canal, which runs through Seattle and connects Lake Washington to Puget Sound.

Broken Island is adjacent to Husky Stadium and was formed in 1916 when Lake Washington was lowered several feet by the opening of the Lake Washington Ship Canal. The island, and the wetlands in which it sits on the lake's shore, were "the result of conversion of shallow water lake habitats following lake level lowering." The island's soil is mostly peat laid down from earlier times.

== History ==
When the level of Lake Washington was dropped nearly nine feet (2.7 m) in 1916 as a result of the opening of the Ship Canal, a good portion of Union Bay and Union Bay Marsh and wetland became dry land, furthered by landfill activities. The marsh and much of the bay was filled from 1911 to 1967. The Montlake Landfill (in use from 1926 to 1967) was the fictional home of television clown J. P. Patches, resident 1958 through 1981. The University Village shopping center (1956) and most of the east main campus of the University of Washington (UW) but for Husky Stadium sit on this land today. What remains of Union Bay Marsh is the restored remnant within the Union Bay Natural Area of the UW.

As well as providing the outlet for Lake Washington, Union Bay receives the water of Arboretum Creek, and Ravenna Creek via pipeline from Ravenna Park through south Ravenna, daylighted past the restored Union Bay Natural Area.

The shores of what is now Union Bay have been inhabited since the end of the last glacial period, about 10,000 years ago. Ancestors of the Native American Duwamish tribe today, until the 1850s the Dkh^{w}’Duw’Absh, "the People of the Inside", of the (Skagit-Nisqually) Lushootseed Coast Salish nations had villages around Union Bay.

The village of hehs-KWEE-kweel ("skate") was of the hloo-weelh-AHBSH (from s'hloo-WEELH, "a tiny hole drilled to measure the thickness of a canoe"), for the narrow passage through then-large and resource-rich Union Bay marsh. Traces of the marsh survive as the Union Bay Natural Area and the Foster Island area of north Washington Park Arboretum. The trees and the island of Stitici (Stee-tee-tchee) were their ceremonial burial ground. Stitici, Little Island, is now called Foster Island. The village was at the northeast tip of what is now Madison Park. One of the longhouses (forerunners of cohousing for tens of people) may have been used as a potlatch house. The Duwamish Tribe is today leveraging the sacred site in the path of substantial enlargement of State Route 520 through south Union Bay between Redmond and Interstate 5, in their quest for recognition.

The prominent village of SWAH-tsoo-gweel ("portage") was on an abundant and much larger Union Bay, and what is now Ravenna was their backyard before the arrival of European settlers, Laurelhurst in summer. The Seattle, Lake Shore and Eastern Railway was built around 1886 along what is now the Burke-Gilman Trail, following what was the shoreline past where the UW power plant and University Village are today. A longhouse was near the present UW power plant (across Montlake Boulevard from the IMA building), others were around the north shores which were about mile farther north than today, and shores east of what is now the Union Bay Natural Area, with a longhouse or two between what is now the Center for Urban Horticulture and Children's Hospital. Villages were diffuse.

Cheshiahud or Lake John and his family were among the memorable residents around Union Bay in the early decades of Seattle.

== See also ==
- Ravenna, Seattle

== Bibliography ==
- Dailey, Tom (n.d.). "Duwamish-Seattle". coastsalishmap.org.
  Page links to Village Descriptions Duwamish-Seattle section.
  Dailey referenced "Puget Sound Geography" by T. T. Waterman. Washington DC: National Anthropological Archives, mss. [n.d.] [ref. 2];
  Duwamish et al. vs. United States of America, F-275. Washington DC: US Court of Claims, 1927. [ref. 5];
  "Indian Lake Washington" by David Buerge in the Seattle Weekly, 1–7 August 1984 [ref. 8];
  "Seattle Before Seattle" by David Buerge in the Seattle Weekly, 17–23 December 1980. [ref. 9];
  The Puyallup-Nisqually by Marian W. Smith. New York: Columbia University Press, 1940. [ref. 10].
  Recommended start is "Coast Salish Villages of Puget Sound"
- Goetz Troost, Kathy (2004), Mapping the Geology of the Greater Seattle Area: Infiltration, Peat Bogs, and Volcanic Ash (PDF), The Pacific Northwest Center For Geologic Mapping Studies at University of Washington Department of Earth and Space Sciences – via King County Department of Natural Resources and Parks
- "HISTORY @ UBNA". Center for Urban Horticulture, Departments, University of Washington (n.d., 1999 per "Montlake Landfill Information Summary, January 1999" on page), retrieved 21 April 2006.
- Integrated aquatic vegetation management plan, Union Bay King County, Washington (PDF), Herrera Environmental Consultants, February 9, 2011 – via Washington State Department of Ecology
- Phelps, Myra L., Public works in Seattle. Seattle: Seattle Engineering Department, 1978. ISBN 0-9601928-1-6.
- "Ravenna". Seattle City Clerk's Neighborhood Map Atlas (n.d., map.jpg c. 17 June 2002), retrieved 21 April 2006. Note caveat in footer.
  Maps "NN-1030S", "NN-1040S".jpg dated 17 June 2002.
- Rochester, Junius (2002-11-20) [2001-06-09]. "Seattle Neighborhoods: Laurelhurst – Thumbnail History". HistoryLink.org Essay 3345. revised.
  Rochester referenced Christine Barrett, A History of Laurelhurst (Seattle: Laurelhurst Community Club, 1981, revised 1989);
  Paul Dorpat, Seattle: Now & Then, Vols. II and III (Seattle: Tartu Publications, 1984 and 1989);
  Lucile Saunders McDonald, The Lake Washington Story, (Seattle: Superior Publishing Co., 1979);
  Brandt Morgan, Enjoying Seattle's Parks (Seattle: Greenwood Publications, 1979);
  Harry W. Higman and Earl J. Larrison, Union Bay: The Life of a City Marsh, (Seattle: University of Washington Press, 1951);
  J. Willis Sayre, This City of Ours (Seattle: Seattle School District No. 1, 1936);
  Sophie Frye Bass, Pig-Tail Days in Old Seattle (Portland, OR: Binfords & Mort, 1937);
  Roger Sale, Seattle: Past to Present (Seattle: University of Washington Press, 1976).
- Stein, Alan J. "Patches, Julius Pierpont", HistoryLink. 2 March 2003, retrieved 21 April 2006. Stein referenced Jack Broom, "The J.P. Generation," Pacific Magazine, The Seattle Times, 4 April 1993, pp. 6–11,14-17;
  Bill Cartmel, "Hi Ya, Patches Pals," Seattle Post-Intelligencer, 11 April 1971, pp. 6–7;
  Erik Lacitis, "Patches Understands – and Survives," The Seattle Times, 23 February 1978, p. A15;
  [no title], The East Side Journal, 31 May 1962, p. 3; Ibid. 14 May 1969, p. 19.
- Switzer, Jeff (2005-02-20). "Duwamish Tribe seeks protection for Foster Island". King County Journal.
- "University District". Seattle City Clerk's Neighborhood Map Atlas (n.d., map.jpg 13 June), retrieved 21 April 2006. Note caveat in footer.
